= List of schools in Bradford =

This is a list of schools in the City of Bradford in the English county of West Yorkshire.

== State-funded schools ==
=== Primary schools ===
- The Academy at St James, Allerton
- Addingham Primary School, Addingham
- All Saints CE Primary School, Little Horton
- All Saints' CE Primary School, Ilkley
- Appleton Academy, Wyke
- Ashlands Primary School, Ilkley
- Atlas Community Primary School, Manningham
- Baildon CE Primary School, Baildon
- Bankfoot Primary School, Bankfoot
- Barkerend Primary Leadership Academy, Pollard Park
- Beckfoot Allerton Primary School, Allerton
- Beckfoot Heaton Primary, Heaton
- Beckfoot Nessfield, Keighley
- Beckfoot Priestthorpe Primary School, Bingley
- Ben Rhydding Primary School, Ben Rhydding
- Blakehill Primary School, Idle
- Bowling Park Primary School, West Bowling
- Brackenhill Primary School, Great Horton
- Bradford Academy, East Bowling
- Bradford Girls' Grammar School, Girlington
- Burley and Woodhead CE Primary School, Burley in Wharfedale
- Burley Oaks Primary School, Burley in Wharfedale
- Byron Primary School, Barkerend
- Carlton Mills, Manningham
- Carrwood Primary School, Holme Wood
- Cavendish Primary School, Eccleshill
- Christ Church CE Academy, Shipley
- Clayton St John CE Primary School, Clayton
- Clayton Village Primary School, Clayton
- Co-op Academy Parkland, Thorpe Edge
- Co-op Academy Princeville, Lister Hills
- Copthorne Primary School, Shearbridge
- Cottingley Village Primary School, Cottingley
- Crossflatts Primary School, Crossflatts
- Crossley Hall Primary School, Crossley Hall
- Cullingworth Village Primary School, Cullingworth
- Denholme Primary School, Denholme
- Dixons Allerton Academy, Allerton
- Dixons Manningham Academy, Manningham
- Dixons Marchbank Primary, Barkerend
- Dixons Music Primary, Shearbridge
- East Morton CE Primary School, East Morton
- Eastburn Junior and Infant School, Eastburn
- Eastwood Community School, Keighley
- Eldwick Primary School, Gilstead
- Fagley Primary School, Fagley
- Farfield Primary School, Buttershaw
- Farnham Primary School, Lidget Green
- Fearnville Primary School, Laisterdyke
- Feversham Primary Academy, Barkerend
- Foxhill Primary School, Queensbury
- Frizinghall Primary School, Frizinghall
- Girlington Primary School, Girlington
- Glenaire Primary School, Baildon
- Green Lane Primary School, Manningham
- Greengates Primary Academy, Greengates
- Grove House Primary School, Bolton Outlanes
- Harden Primary School, Harden
- Haworth Primary School, Haworth
- Heaton St Barnabas CE Primary School, Heaton
- High Crags Primary Leadership Academy, Shipley
- Hill Top CE Primary School, Low Moor
- Hollingwood Primary School, Horton Bank
- Holybrook Primary School, Greengates
- Holycroft Primary School, Keighley
- Home Farm Primary School, Buttershaw
- Horton Grange Primary School, Great Horton
- Horton Park Primary School, Canterbury
- Hoyle Court Primary School, Baildon
- Idle CE Primary School, Idle
- Ingrow Primary School, Ingrow
- Iqra Academy, Manningham
- Keelham Primary School, Keelham
- Keighley St Andrew's CE Primary School, Keighley
- Killinghall Primary School, Barkerend
- Knowleswood Primary School, Dudley Hill
- Lapage Primary School, Barkerend
- Laycock Primary School, Laycock
- Lees Primary School, Keighley
- Ley Top Primary School, Allerton
- Lidget Green Primary School, Lidget Green
- Lilycroft Primary School, Manningham
- Long Lee Primary School, Long Lee
- Low Ash Primary School, Wrose
- Low Moor CE Primary School, Low Moor
- Lower Fields Primary Academy, Cutler Heights
- Margaret McMillan Primary School, Heaton
- Marshfield Primary, Little Horton
- Menston Primary School, Menston
- Merlin Top Primary Academy, Keighley
- Miriam Lord Primary School, Manningham
- Myrtle Park Primary, Bingley
- Newby Primary School, Holme Top
- Newhall Park Primary School, Bierley
- Oakworth Primary School, Oakworth
- Oldfield Primary School, Oldfield
- Our Lady and St Brendan's RC Primary School, Idle
- Our Lady of Victories RC School, Keighley
- Oxenhope CE Primary School, Oxenhope
- Parkwood Primary School, Keighley
- Peel Park Primary School, Undercliffe
- Poplars Farm Primary School, Bolton Outlanes
- Princeville Primary School, Lister Hills
- Rainbow Primary Leadership Academy, Shearbridge
- Reevy Hill Primary School, Buttershaw
- Riddlesden St Mary's CE Primary School, Riddlesden
- Russell Hall Primary School, Queensbury
- Ryecroft Primary Academy, Holme Wood
- The Sacred Heart RC Primary School, Ben Rhydding
- St Anne's RC Primary School, Keighley
- St Anthony's RC Primary School, Clayton
- St Anthony's RC Primary School, Shipley
- St Clare's RC Primary School, Fagley
- St Columba's RC Primary School, Dudley Hill
- St Cuthbert and the First Martyrs' RC Primary School, Heaton
- St Francis RC Primary School, Bolton Outlanes
- St John the Evangelist RC Primary School, Slack Side
- St John's CE Primary School, Bierley
- St Joseph's RC Primary School, Bingley
- St Joseph's RC Primary School, Holme Top
- St Joseph's RC Primary School, Ingrow
- St Luke's CE Primary School, Eccleshill
- St Mary's & St Peter's RC Primary School, Laisterdyke
- St Matthew's CE Primary School, West Bowling
- St Matthew's RC Primary School, Allerton
- St Oswald's CE Primary Academy, Great Horton
- St Paul's CE Primary School, Buttershaw
- St Philip's CE Primary School, Girlington
- St Stephen's CE Primary School, West Bowling
- St Walburga's RC Primary School, Shipley
- St William's RC Primary School, Longlands
- St Winefride's RC Primary School, Wibsey
- Saltaire Primary School, Saltaire
- Sandal Primary School, Baildon
- Sandy Lane Primary School, Allerton
- Shibden Head Primary Academy, Queensbury
- Shipley CE Primary School, Shipley
- Shirley Manor Primary School, Wyke
- Silsden Primary School, Silsden
- Southmere Primary Academy, Great Horton
- Stanbury Village School, Stanbury
- Steeton Primary School, Steeton
- Stocks Lane Primary School, Queensbury
- Swain House Primary School, Bolton Outlanes
- Thackley Primary School, Thackley
- Thornbury Primary Leadership Academy, Thornbury
- Thornton Primary School, Thornton
- Thorpe Primary, Idle
- Trinity All Saints CE Primary School, Bingley
- Victoria Primary School, Keighley
- Wellington Primary School, Undercliffe
- Westbourne Primary School, Manningham
- Westminster CE Primary Academy, Belle Vue
- Whetley Academy, Girlington
- Wibsey Primary School, Wibsey
- Wilsden Primary School, Wilsden
- Woodlands CE Primary Academy, Oakenshaw
- Woodside Academy, Moor Side
- Worth Valley Primary School, Keighley
- Worthinghead Primary School, Wyke
- Wycliffe CE Primary School, Shipley

=== Secondary schools ===
- Appleton Academy, Wyke
- Beckfoot Oakbank, Keighley
- Beckfoot School, Bingley
- Beckfoot Thornton, Thornton
- Beckfoot Upper Heaton, Heaton
- Belle Vue Girls' Academy, Heaton
- Bingley Grammar School, Bingley
- Bradford Academy, East Bowling
- Bradford Forster Academy, Cutler Heights
- Bradford Girls' Grammar School, Girlington
- Bronte Girls' Academy, East Bowling
- Buttershaw Business and Enterprise College, Buttershaw
- Carlton Bolling, Undercliffe
- Carlton Keighley, Utley
- Co-op Academy Grange, Little Horton
- Dixons Allerton Academy, Allerton
- Dixons City Academy, Holme Top
- Dixons Cottingley Academy, Cottingley
- Dixons Kings Academy, Lidget Green
- Dixons McMillan Academy, Shearbridge
- Dixons Trinity Academy, Shearbridge
- Eden Boys' Leadership Academy, Brown Royd
- Feversham Girls' Academy, Undercliffe
- Hanson Academy, Bolton Outlanes
- The Holy Family Catholic School, Keighley
- Ilkley Grammar School, Ilkley
- Immanuel College, Idle
- Laisterdyke Leadership Academy, Laisterdyke
- Oasis Academy Lister Park, Frizinghall
- One In A Million Free School, Belle Vue
- Parkside School, Cullingworth
- St Bede's and St Joseph's Catholic College, Heaton
- Titus Salt School, Baildon
- Tong Leadership Academy, Tong
- Trinity Academy Bradford, Queensbury

=== Special and alternative schools ===
- Beckfoot Phoenix, Keighley
- Beechcliffe School, Utley
- Bradford Alternative Provision Academy, Saltaire
- Chellow Heights School, Heaton
- Co-op Academy Delius, Barkerend
- Co-op Academy Southfield, Little Horton
- Hazelbeck School, Bingley
- High Park School, Heaton
- Oastlers School, East Bowling
- Primary Pupil Referral Unit, West Bowling
- Tracks, Shipley

=== Further education ===
- Bradford College
- Dixons Free Sixth Form
- New College Bradford
- Shipley College

== Independent schools ==
=== Primary and preparatory schools ===
- Crystal Gardens Primary School, Holme Top
- Ghyll Royd School, Burley in Wharfedale
- Islamic Tarbiyah Preparatory School, Manningham
- Lady Lane Park School, Bingley
- Moorfield School, Ilkley
- Westville House School, Ilkley

=== Senior and all-through schools ===
- Al Mumin Schools, Manningham
- Bradford Christian School, Bolton Woods
- Bradford Grammar School, Frizinghall
- Darul Uloom Dawatul Imaan, Dudley Hill
- Eden Springs Girls Secondary, Holme Top
- Eternal Light School, Little Horton
- The Fountain School, Little Horton
- Jaamiatul Imaam Muhammad Zakaria, Clayton

=== Special and alternative schools ===
- Broadbeck Learning Centre, Buttershaw
- Prism Independent School, Girlington
- Training and Skills Centre, Eastbrook
