= Bradford Academy =

Bradford Academy might refer to:

- Former name of Bradford College (United States)
- Current name of Bradford Academy, West Yorkshire
