= BD postcode area =

Postcode area within the United Kingdom

Bradford
- Postcode area
- Location within the United Kingdom
- Coordinates: 53.832°N 1.836°W
- Sovereign state: United Kingdom
- Postcode area: BD
- Postcode area name: Bradford
- Post towns: 7
- Postcode districts: 27
- Postcode sectors: 112
- Postcodes (live): 16,979
- Postcodes (total): 23,359
- Statistics as at May 2020

The BD postcode area, also known as the Bradford postcode area, is a group of 24 postcode districts in England, within seven post towns. These cover northwestern West Yorkshire (including Bradford, Bingley, Shipley, Cleckheaton and Keighley) and southwestern North Yorkshire (including Skipton and Settle), plus very small parts of Lancashire.

Mail for the BD postcode area is processed at Leeds Mail Centre, along with mail for the HD, HG, HX, LS, WF and YO postcode areas.

== Coverage ==
The approximate coverage of the postcode districts:

Postcode district	Post town	Coverage	Local authority area(s)
BD1	BRADFORD	Bradford City Centre, Little Germany, Goitside, Independent Quarter, West End, City Park	Bradford
BD2	BRADFORD	Eccleshill, Fagley, Five Lane Ends, Bolton Woods, Ashbourne, Bolton, parts of Undercliffe, Moorside, parts of Wrose	Bradford, Leeds
BD3	BRADFORD	Barkerend, Bradford Moor, Thornbury, Eastbrook, Pollard Park, parts of, Laisterdyke, parts of Undercliffe, Wapping	Bradford, Leeds
BD4	BRADFORD	Bierley, East Bowling, East Bierley, Laisterdyke, Tong, Tong Street, Holme Wood, Dudley Hill, Tyersal, Swaine Green, Cutler Heights, Tong Village	Bradford, Leeds, Kirklees
BD5	BRADFORD	Bankfoot, Little Horton, West Bowling, Canterbury, Marshfields, Ripleyville,	Bradford
BD6	BRADFORD	Buttershaw, Wibsey, Woodside, Westwood Park, Odsal, Staithgate, parts of Horton Bank Top (Cooperville)	Bradford
BD7	BRADFORD	Great Horton, Lidget Green, Scholemoor, Horton Bank Top, Horton Grange	Bradford
BD8	BRADFORD	Manningham, Girlington, White Abbey, Lower Grange, Four Lane Ends, Longlands, West Park, Crossley Hall, Belle Vue	Bradford
BD9	BRADFORD	Frizinghall, Emm Lane, Heaton, Daisy Hill, Haworth Road Estate, Chellow Heights, Chellow Grange	Bradford
BD10	BRADFORD	Apperley Bridge, Greengates, Idle, Ravenscliffe, Thackley, Thorpe Edge.	Bradford, Leeds
BD11	BRADFORD	Adwalton, Birkenshaw, Cockersdale, Drighlington	Kirklees, Leeds
BD12	BRADFORD	Low Moor, Oakenshaw, Wyke, Lower Wyke, Delph Hill	Bradford, Kirklees
BD13	BRADFORD	Cullingworth, Clayton Heights Denholme, Queensbury, Thornton, School Green	Bradford
BD14	BRADFORD	Clayton	Bradford
BD15	BRADFORD	Allerton, Norr, Wilsden, Sandy Lane	Bradford
BD16	BINGLEY	Bingley, Cottingley, Eldwick, Harden	Bradford
BD17	SHIPLEY	Baildon, Shipley	Bradford
BD18	SHIPLEY	Saltaire, Shipley, Windhill, Wrose	Bradford
BD19	CLECKHEATON	Cleckheaton, Gomersal, Scholes	Kirklees
BD20	KEIGHLEY	Cononley, Lothersdale, Cross Hills, East Morton, Glusburn, Kildwick, Silsden, Steeton, Utley, Riddlesden, Sutton-in-Craven, Bradley, Farnhill	Bradford, North Yorkshire
BD21	KEIGHLEY	Hainworth, Keighley	Bradford
BD22	KEIGHLEY	Cowling, Haworth, Oakworth, Oxenhope, Cross Roads	Bradford
BD23	SKIPTON	Bracewell, Carleton-in-Craven, Embsay, Thornton in Craven, Gargrave, Grassington, Hebden, Hellifield, Horton, Kettlewell, Kirkby Malham, Skipton, Threshfield, Tosside	North Yorkshire, Ribble Valley
BD24	SETTLE	Giggleswick, Horton in Ribblesdale, Settle	North Yorkshire
BD97	BINGLEY		non-geographic
BD98	BRADFORD		non-geographic
BD98	SHIPLEY		
BD99	BRADFORD	Euroway Trading Estate M606	non-geographic

== Map ==
BD postcode area map, showing postcode districts in red and post towns in grey text, with links to nearby BB, DL, HD, HG, HX, LA, LS, OL and WF postcode areas.

== See also ==
- List of postcode areas in the United Kingdom
- Postcode Address File
