= BD20 =

BD20 could refer to:

- BD20, a postcode district in the BD postcode area
- Biodiesel
