= Appleton Academy (disambiguation) =

Appleton Academy may refer to

- Appleton Academy, a school in Wyke, England
- Appleton Academy, Mont Vernon, a former school in New Hampshire, United States
- New Ipswich Academy, also known as Appleton Academy, a former school in New Ipswich, New Hampshire
