= Beckfoot Trust =

The Beckfoot Trust is a multi-academy trust, with 10 academies based in Bradford, West Yorkshire.

== Description ==
As an academy, Beckfoot School is the founding school of the Beckfoot Trust, a multi-academy trust. Hazelbeck School joined the trust in 2013 and Beckfoot Upper Heaton in 2015. Beckfoot Thornton joined in 2016. Former headteacher, David Horn, is the head of the Beckfoot Trust and was replaced with Gillian Halls as headteacher, Ms. Halls has since joined, Mr. Horn is currently running the Beckfoot Trust. She has been replaced by Mr. Simon Wade, former headteacher of Beckfoot Upper-Heaton.

== Schools ==
- Beckfoot School
- Hazelbeck
- Beckfoot Upper Heaton
- Beckfoot Allerton Primary School
- Beckfoot Heaton Primary School
- Beckfoot Oakbank
- Beckfoot Thornton
- Beckfoot Priestthorpe
- Beckfoot Phoenix
- Beckfoot Nessfield
