= Belle Vue, Bradford =

District of Bradford, West Yorkshire, England

Coordinates: 53.804°N 1.763°W

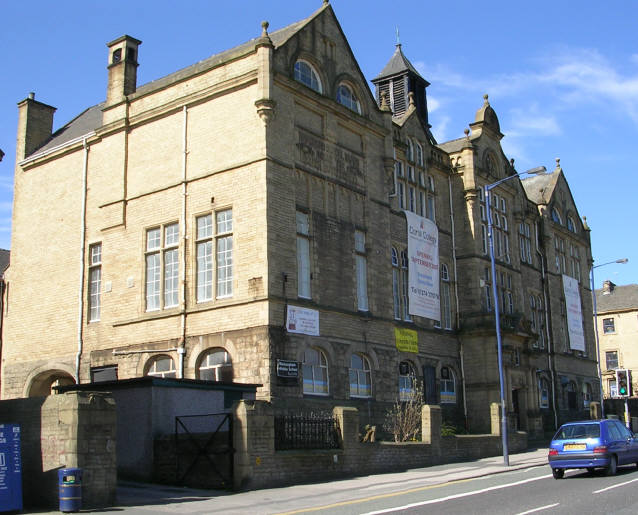
Former Belle Vue High School for Boys

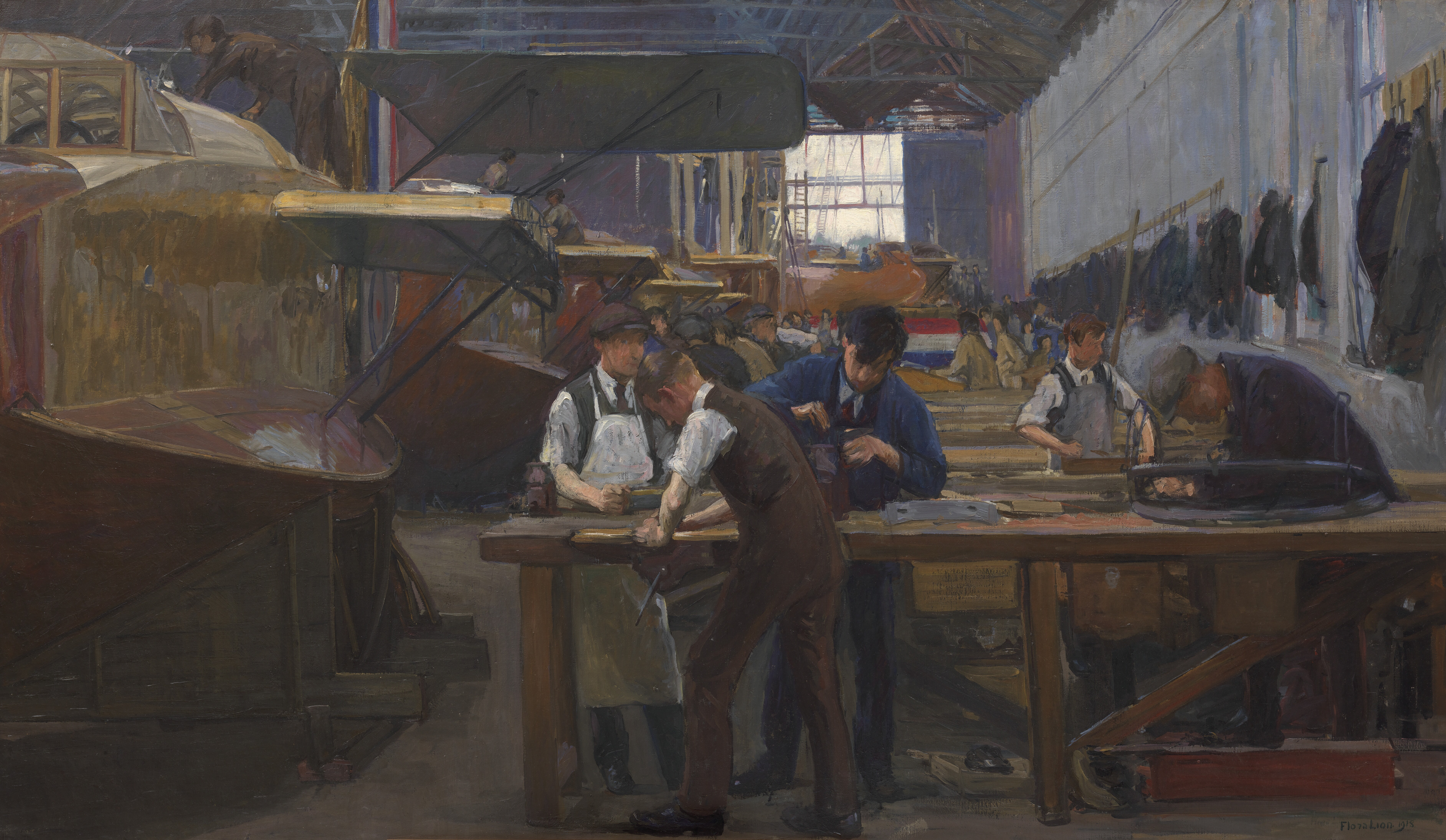
Aircraft factory in Belle Vue during the First World War

Belle Vue is a district of Bradford, West Yorkshire, England with a post code of BD8. It is located near Manningham Lane, home of the Belle Vue Barracks, the former Belle Vue Pub, and the original location of Belle Vue Boys' Grammar School (now Beckfoot Upper Heaton). The area overlooks Valley Parade, the home of Bradford City AFC. Its name is derived from the fact that the site enjoyed a prominent view to the south and east, for which Belle Vue Terrace was known.

Paul Bayes, the Anglican Bishop of Liverpool attended Belle Vue Boys' School in the 1970s.
