= Staithgate =

Area of the City of Bradford, West Yorkshire, England

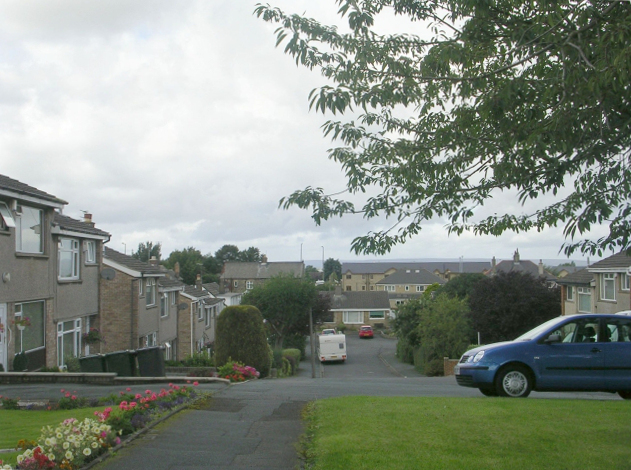
- Staygate Green

- Location within West Yorkshire
- OS grid reference: SE163301
- Metropolitan borough: City of Bradford
- Metropolitan county: West Yorkshire
- Region: Yorkshire and the Humber
- Country: England
- Sovereign state: United Kingdom
- Postcode district: BD6
- Dialling code: 01274
- Police: West Yorkshire
- Fire: West Yorkshire
- Ambulance: Yorkshire

Staithgate, also called Staygate, is a community in the City of Bradford, West Yorkshire, England. The postcode serving Staithgate: BD6. The community is near the M606 motorway.

== Commerce ==
There are now more than forty registered businesses in the industrial estate, There is a high number of home businesses.

== Geography ==
Staithgate is located at 53°46′01.20″N 01°45′06.11″W. (2.0 mi^{2}) of it is land and (0.14 mi^{2}) of it (5%) is water. The elevation is 656 feet (200 m) above sea level. The boundaries on Rooley Avenue to the north, M606 motorway to the east, Low Moor to the south, village of Odsal to the west.

== Demographics ==
Often, many of the people who live in this sort of postcode will be middle income, older couples. These are known as type 33 in the ACORN classification and 3.14% of the UK's population live in this type.

== Transport ==
Distances to major travel hubs are:

- Railway station: Bradford Interchange – 1.74 miles
- Coach station: Bradford Interchange – 1.62 miles
- Airport: Leeds Bradford Airport – 7.95 miles.

Access to the motorway network is provided at the roundabout of A6036 and A6177 roads, where the M606 motorway starts.
