= East Bowling =

Area of Bradford in West Yorkshire, England

Coordinates: 53°46′35″N 1°44′24″W

Bowling and Barkerend
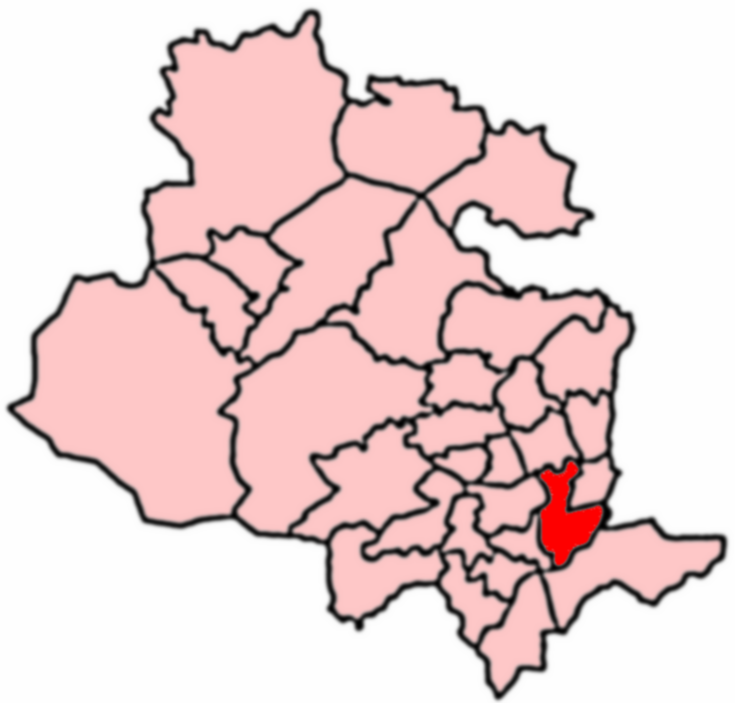
- 2004 Boundaries of Bowling and Barkerend Ward
- Councillors: Rizwana Jamil (Labour Party); Imran Khan (Labour Party); Hassan Uzzaman Khan (Labour Party)

East Bowling is an area of Bradford, West Yorkshire, England located to the south of Bradford city centre. It forms the eastern half of the historic township and manor of Bowling. Bowling became a ward of the newly created Borough of Bradford in 1847. In 1882 the ward was split into the wards of East and West Bowling. In the north the boundary was along the Lancashire and Yorkshire Railway. To the south it was along Hall Lane and Bolling Hall Lane.

The southern/southeastern boundary follows Rooley Lane and Sticker Lane. The northern boundary follows Bowling Back Lane. East Bowling forms a roughly triangular area with its southern apex near Croft Street about 350m from the city centre. Wakefield Road is its main thoroughfare.

East Bowling is now a part of the Bowling and Barkerend ward.

== Early history and topography ==
William Cudworth published his "History of Bowling" in 1891. The opening sentence sets out his difficulty. "In attempting an historical and topographical sketch of the township of Bowling, we are confronted with a .. difficulty .. namely, that no published record previously existed upon which to base our efforts". It is the main source of information for this section.

The township contained 1561 acres. The total acreage of the borough of Bradford at that time was 10,776. Cudworth describes the small becks which drain the area (see Map 1) noting that some do not have definite names. John James in his history of Bradford (1841) has to refer to " a nameless beck arising to the west of Dudley Hill" - which is shown in Map 3 contributing water to the Lady Well Pool. This, Bowling Beck and Law Beck (also known as Claw Beck and Low Beck) had leets which sent their water to the Bowling (manorial) corn Mills - which were nevertheless often stopped by shortage of water.

In the north, Bowling came within a few hundred yards of the centre of Bradford. This was the lowest point of the township at an altitude of about 360 feet (110 m) above sea level. To the south the township boundary followed the watershed between Bradford Dale (draining to the north) and tributaries of the Aire and Calder draining to the south and south west. Map 1 shows that the watershed was at an altitude of 600 feet (180 m) at Laisterdyke (in the east) rising to 700 feet (210 m) at Odsal Top.

Most of Bowling was above the 500 ft contour and much of it above the 600 ft contour. The soil cover was boulder clay, unsuitable for arable farming. Altitude and poor soil limited the available crops. Little wheat could be grown. Grains were either barley or oats. Cudworth could find scant evidence that the "three open field" system had ever been used in Bowling, though it was a major feature of Bradford, Manningham and Horton. Outside of the parks of Bowling Hall the land was divided into small walled closes in pastoral use, a pattern which had prevailed since ancient times. There was no common land in Bowling, and there had never been an inclosure act.

Referring to John Smith's estate map of 1776 Cudworth notes that Bowling was almost devoid of trees (apart from some new planting around Bolling Hall) although place names such as Oaks Fold, Oaks Lane, The Parks, Coppice etc. suggested it was once well wooded. Cudworth laments the substitution of "Bowling" for "Bolling" but is unable to say when it occurred except that it was "early". "If in this sketch we used the modern spelling and pronunciation it will be as a concession to modern notions."

"In ancient times the township appears to have been known as Great and Little Bolling corresponding probably to the present distinctions of East Bowling and West Bowling which are generally speaking divided by the Lancashire and Yorkshire Railway". The distinction long predated the Lancashire and Yorkshire Railway, opened 1850. The traditional line of demarcation was probably the Bowling Beck and its tributary beck which arose in The Roughs, as shown on maps 1 and 4. This was close to the railway and also the route of the coal tramway from the Burras engine to Britannia Mills staithes, (shown on map 2) opened c 1840. In 1847 Bowling became one of the 8 wards of the newly created Municipal Borough of Bradford. In 1881 Bowling ward was divided into East and West Bowling wards. The ward boundary in the north was the Bowling Beck but in the south was Bolling Hall Road. Colloquial usage still recognised, and still does recognise, the traditional boundary described by Cudworth rather than the administrative boundary of 1881.

"The township is well furnished with roads leading from Bradford and passing from north to south but is deficient in means of communication between east and West Bowling. The map of 1757 "shows Rooley Lane to be the only highway or road from one part of Bowling to the other." This remains true in 2014. Rooley Lane was part of the turnpike road from Leeds to Halifax. It was of little use to residents of Bowling. It was one of four turnpike Roads through Bowling

- 1. Cutler Heights Lane and Rooley Lane (Calverly Moor to Bankfoot) 1734. Leeds and Halifax Trust.
- 2. Sticker Lane, (Leeds Road to Dudley Hill) 1736. Dudley Hill, Killinghall and Harrogate Trust
- 3. Wakefield Road, (Bridge St to Dudley Hill) 1753 Bradford and Wakefield Trust
- 4. Bowling Lane Branch of Leeds and Halifax Trust 1740. The new "Manchester Road" section was not completed until 1826.

All were built in the early 18th century - and were subsequently the scene of protests and riots and breaking down of toll bars. The turnpike roads helped establish Bradford's position as a centre of the textile trades- The Bradford Piece Hall was built in 1770 - but they had little impact on life in Bowling. On the eve of the industrial revolution this still followed a centuries-old pattern of small pastoral farmers supplementing their earnings by home handloom weaving and wool combing and small scale coal mining. Most were tenants. Land ownership was still concentrated in the hands of Wood, the owner of Bolling Hall, who was also Lord of The Manor. In 1780 virtually all the land between Wakefield Road and the boundary with West Bowling belonged to him, besides many parcels in West Bowling. Between Back Lane, Sticker Lane and Wakefield Road Rawson (Lord of the manor of Bradford) was the principal landowner. South of Rooley Lane the principal landowner was Richardson of Bierley Hall. Bierley Church, built on land donated by Richardson, was in East Bowling. In the west of the township were a number of smaller landlords.

This pattern of landholding is reflected in the pattern of land use to the current day.

== Map gallery ==
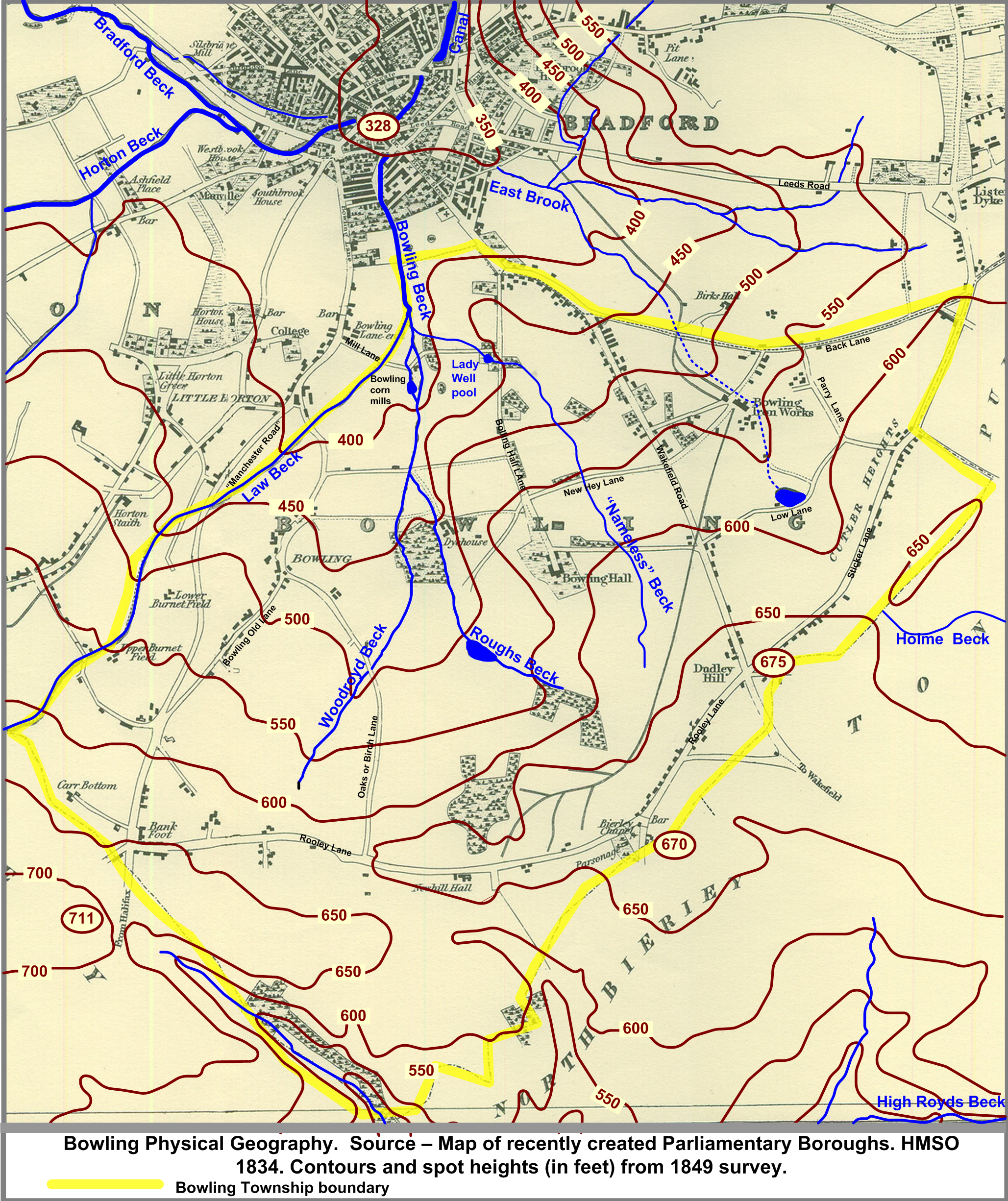
Map 1. Bowling Physical geography Source: Parliamentary map 1834.

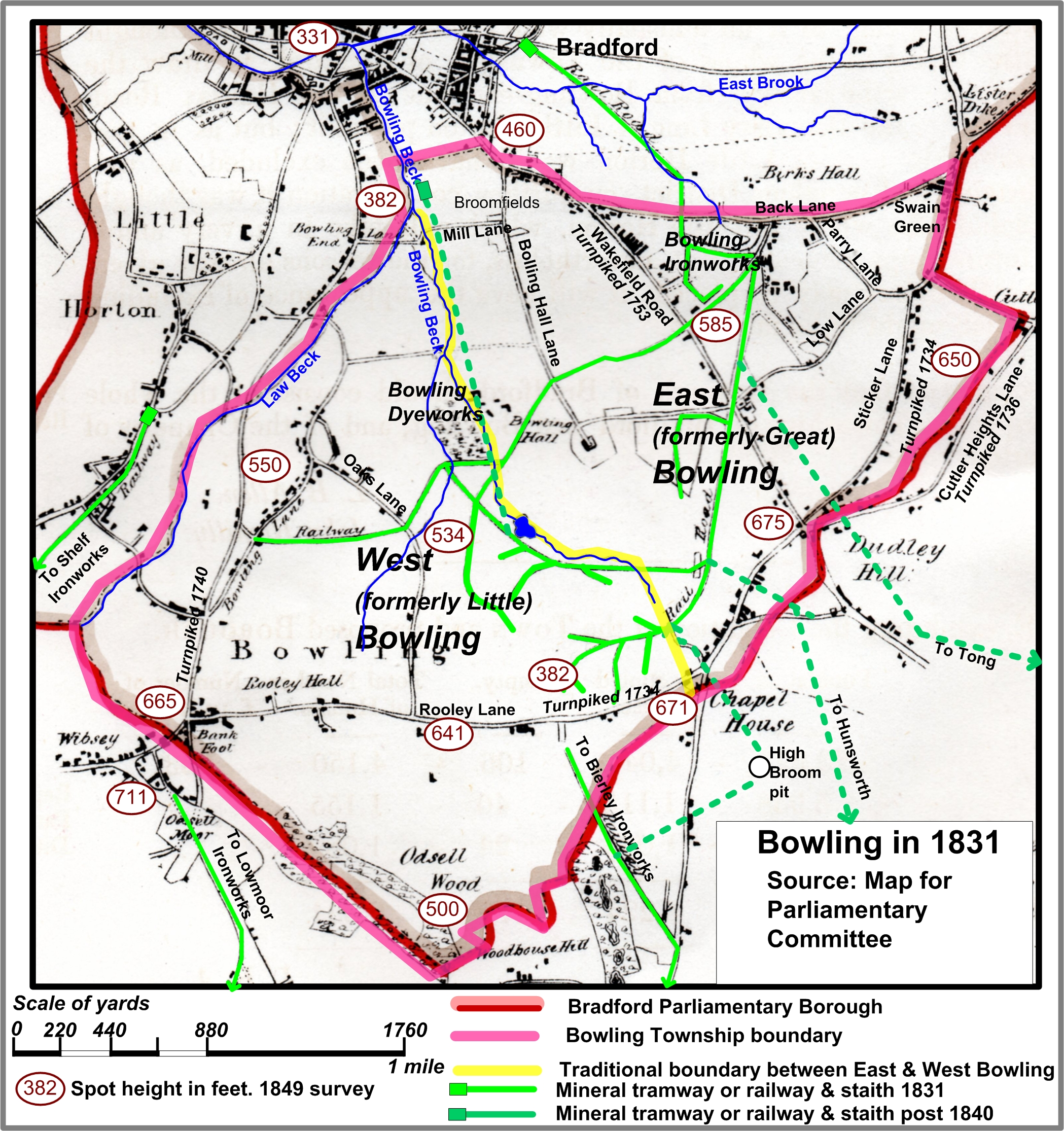
Map 1. Bowling in 1831 Source: Parliamentary map.

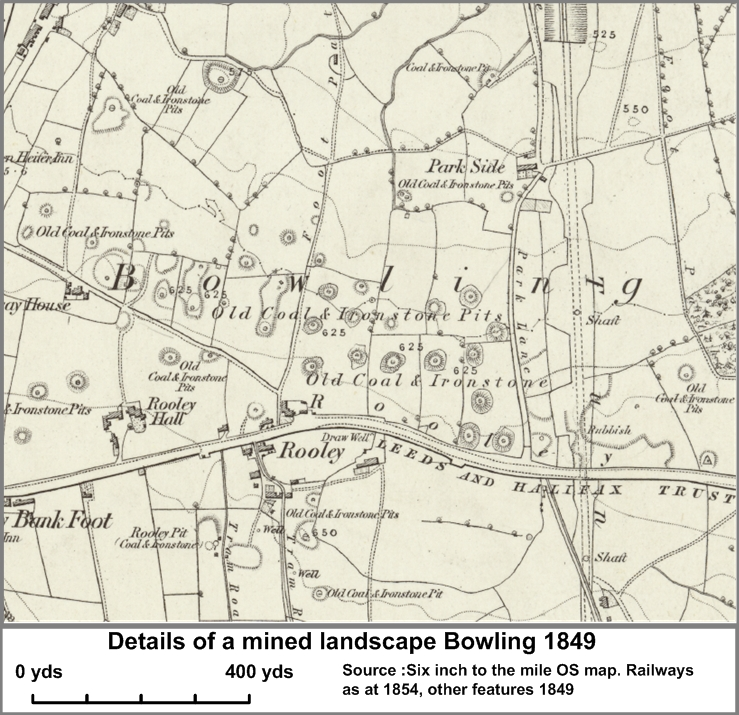
Map 3. Detail of a mined area, The Parks & Rooley . Source: 6" to 1 mile OS map.

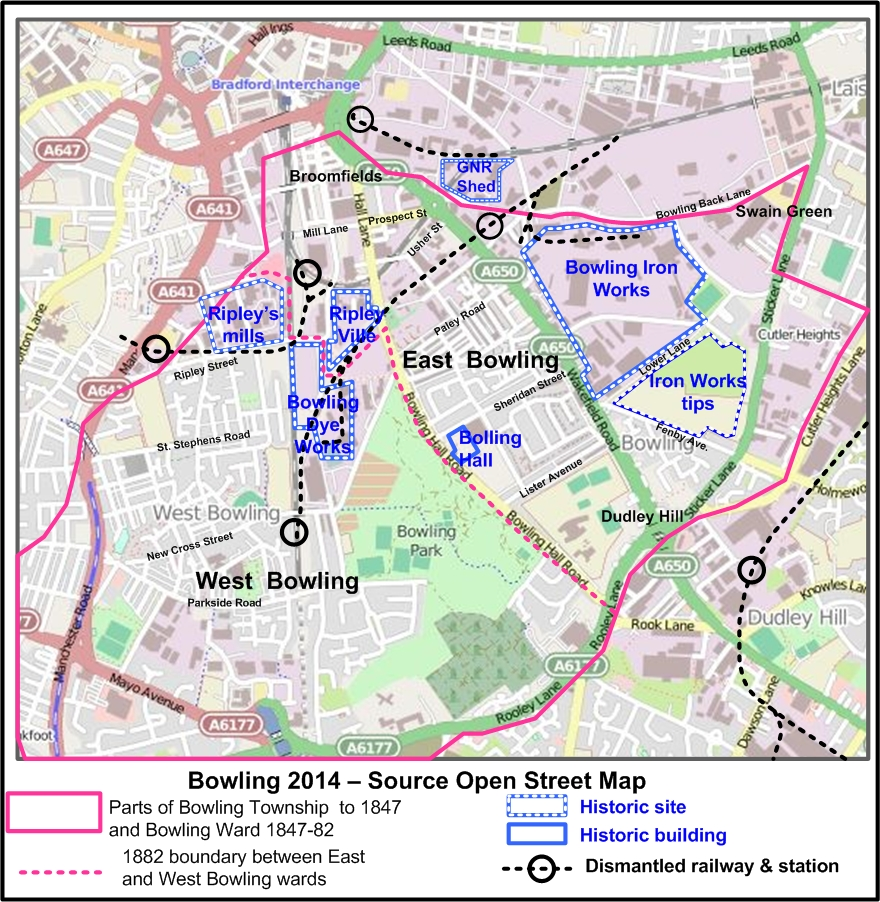
Map 4. East Bowling in 2014. Source: OpenStreetMap.

== The industrial Revolution - coal and iron ==
William Cudworth pointed out that Bradford was "Ironopolis" long before it became "Worstedopolis". Gary Firth writes

"As early as 1796 the Bradford ironworks produced 4,390 tons of Yorkshire's 21,984 tons of pig iron. At the peak of Bradford's coal output in 1866 its forty six collieries produced 1,875,000 tons of coal or twenty per cent of the Yorkshire output of 9,714.000 tons. Thus the economic development of these important and interdependent mineral resources, linked with the advance of cheap water transport, provided Bradford with a broad commercial and financial base upon which to build a new industrial economy in the years after 1800".

For centuries Bradford coal had been mined on a small scale for local consumption. The trigger for expansion was the opening of the Bradford Canal in 1774. With its link to the Leeds and Liverpool canal this opened up markets for coal in Craven and the Aire valley. Abraham Balm, principle proponent of the canal and a major shareholder, owned coal mines in Bowling. By return limestone was transported to Bradford from Skipton, where a branch canal provided a link to the limestone quarries. The limestone was burned and used to improve the poor soils of the district.

The trigger for the exploitation of ironstone deposits was knowledge of the use of coke for iron smelting. From the 1780s ironworks were founded in and around Bradford. The Birkinshaw works was established in 1784. The Shelf works was established in 1785, the Bowling iron works was founded in 1787, the Low Moor works in 1788 and the Bierley works in 1810.

The imported limestone was essential as a blast furnace flux. The local coal measures contained two very notable seams. The low sulphur better bed coal was used to make a blast furnace coke of very high quality. The black bed coal, 130 feet above it, was a good general purpose coal overlain with seams of ironstone with a 32% iron content. The seat earths of the seams yielded ganister (needed for furnace linings) and fire clay. There were intermediate seams of good brick making clay and building stone.

The partnerships which founded the new works had access to large scale capital, scientific knowledge and expert engineers, far beyond the resources of local landowners. They also had the good fortune to enter production at the right time. From 1793 the French wars produced an insatiable government demand for iron and armaments.

In 1787 John Sturges and partners acquired the East Bowling estates of Benjamin Rawson. By 1790 they had constructed and brought the Bowling Iron Works into production and were seeking to gain access to additional mineral reserves outside the works boundaries. The first tramway was constructed in 1792.

In 1792 Francis Lindley Wood (owner of Bolling Hall and Lord of the manor) attained his majority and proceeded to sink sunk coal mines on his estates. He delegated management of the mines to his energetic land agent, Isaac Wells. Isaac Wells only operated the New Heigh pit directly (It provided Sir Francis with a profit of £1200 pa.) and sub let other mines to "pit takers". In 1794 Sir Francis leased 93 acres of ironstone in Hall Lane to the Bowling Iron works. He subsequently leased mining rights on other parts of his estate. In 1801 mining activity had encroached on his house of Bolling Hall and disliking the despoiled landscape he decided to move to another of his houses at Hemsworth, leaving his Bradford affairs in the hands of Isaac Wells. From 1803 most of the mineral rights of Sir Francis's estates were leased or sold piecemeal to the Bowling Iron Works. In February 1816 he sold all his remaining landholdings and mineral rights in Bowling and Bradford to the iron works. In 1821 the ironworks also bought the lordship of the manor with the manorial lands and mineral rights. The Ironworks thus became the dominant landowner in East Bowling - owning nearly all of it - and the major landowner in West Bowling.

Throughout the 19th century the ironworks expanded its mining operations - and in the process developed an extensive network of tramways and narrow gauge railways from its mines to the iron works and also to staithes in Bradford. (see map 2) From 1850 these were extended across the watershed to access to reserves to the south of Bradford. The ironworks eventually had collieries as far south as Gomersal and Cleckheaton and over 20 miles of tramway. In 1854 the "Bradford Avoiding Line" was built by the GNR to link its Leeds-Bradford railway via a junction at Hammerton Street to the L&YR line to the south of Bowling Tunnel. Later that year the Bowling Ironworks opened an extensive set of standard gauge private lines and sidings with a junction to the "Avoiding Line" at Bowling Bridge station, making the works much less dependent on its tramways and canal transport.

From about 1850 reserves in Bowling were becoming exhausted and some landholdings were sold off. This process was not straight forward as mining had rendered much of the surface too unstable for building development. Map 3 shows an area near the Parks which was so unstable it remained undeveloped until the very end of the 20th century and which still (2014) suffers from periodic shaft collapses. One of the most important land sales occurred in 1849 when Messrs Ripley and Son of the Bowling dye works purchased the freehold of the site, about 100 acres of land surrounding it (later expanded to 130 acres) and the pumping shafts of several former collieries. The pumping shafts provided a constant supply of high quality soft water to the dye works of 1.25million gallons per day with a surplus of about 0.6 million gallons per day which was distributed via Ripley's water works to domestic and other industrial consumers. At that date the Bradford Waterworks company (purchased by the Borough Council in 1854) could only provide a very intermittent supply of about 0.5 million gallons per day. In 1854, the dye works, like the ironworks built its own standard gauge internal private railway with a junction with the GNR near Hall Lane.

In addition to scattering the landscape with spoil heaps and rendering the ground too unstable for building the ironworks had a disastrous effect on the atmosphere. A constant pall of smoke and foul smelling fumes hung over the works and surrounding area "The Bowling Hell" with a high incidence of respiratory diseases. Within the works a huge smoking spoil heap "the Bowling Coke Hill" grew continuously until the ironworks ceased production in 1906. It continued to burn and smoke for many years. It towered nearly 250feet above Wakefield Road and dwarfed the nearby St John's church. In the Second World War an anti aircraft bunker was built on its summit. It was not cleared until the late 1950s when Hepworth and Grandages acquired the site and levelled it to expand their engineering works. The iron works also used the area north of Lower Lane as additional tipping space; eventually it was covered by a plateau of slag and clinker about 50 feet deep. Clearance for re-development has only recently started. Map 4 shows the locations of these sites.

== Demographics ==
East Bowling is ethnically diverse, with a White British majority, Eastern European communities, and a significant British Pakistani minority.

== Houses and land use in the 21st century ==
Most of the 19th century and earlier housing of East Bowling was demolished under the 1951 "Bradford Development Plan". The existing housing stock in the area is mainly late Victorian and early 20th century Terrace houses, built between 1895 and 1914, with some more modern houses. Most of these houses are concentrated in the relatively small area between Wakefield Road and Bowling Hall Road and between Paley Road in the north and Lister Avenue in the south. The area was developed at a time when the city was thriving and it was a quite well-to-do part of Bradford. In recent years East Bowling has become rather run-down.

There are smaller but more recently built concentrations of houses in two other areas; between Fenby Avenue and Wakefield Road and between Broad Lane and Wellington Street in the Cutler Heights area.

Most land in East Bowling is either in commercial or industrial use A significant area on Lower Lane is unused brownfield land: it was originally used by the Bowling Iron Works as a slag and cinder tip. Bowling Park and the adjacent "green area" of allotments and sports fields are mostly in East Bowling but the Park also has a main gate to New Cross Street - easily accessible to East Bowling residents.

== Landmarks ==
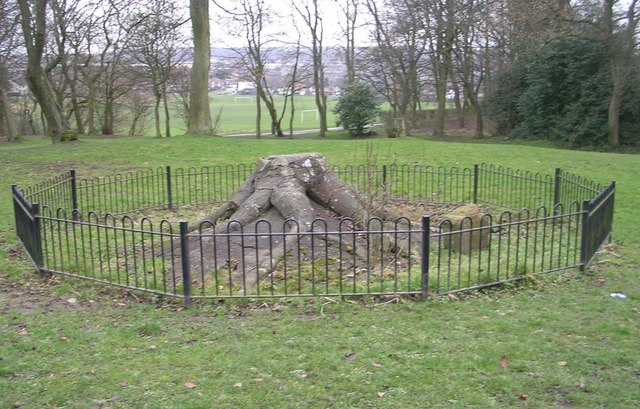
Bowling Park fossil tree. Copyright Betty Longbottom. Creative Commons c.by3.0

In the centre of East Bowling is Bowling Park with its fossil tree, and the nearby Bolling Hall museum. Bowling Cemetery is situated to the south on the ring road. Bradford Academy is an academy located on Bowling Hall Road outside the eastern boundary of Bowling Park. The academy has up to 2,000 students.

Churches of several faiths fall within the area. These include St John's Anglican, and New Hey Road Methodist.

St. Ann's Roman Catholic Church was closed in 1996 and the parish amalgamated with St Joseph, Manchester Road. St Ann's was the centre of the Irish community of Broomfields, once one of the most densely populated areas of Bradford and with some of the worst slums. By contrast in the north of Broomfields was the model village of Ripley Ville with spacious four bedroom houses for the upper levels of the working classes.

The Gurdwara Guru Nanak Dev Ji Sikh gurdwara is located on Usher Street, near to the junction of Wakefield Road.

Pictures of East Bowling

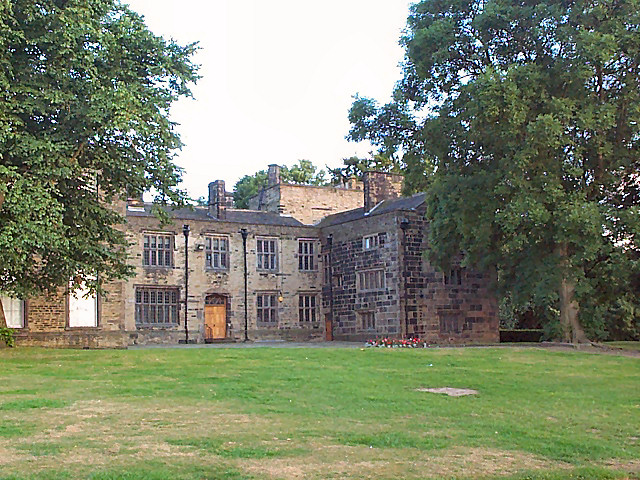
Bolling Hall north front.

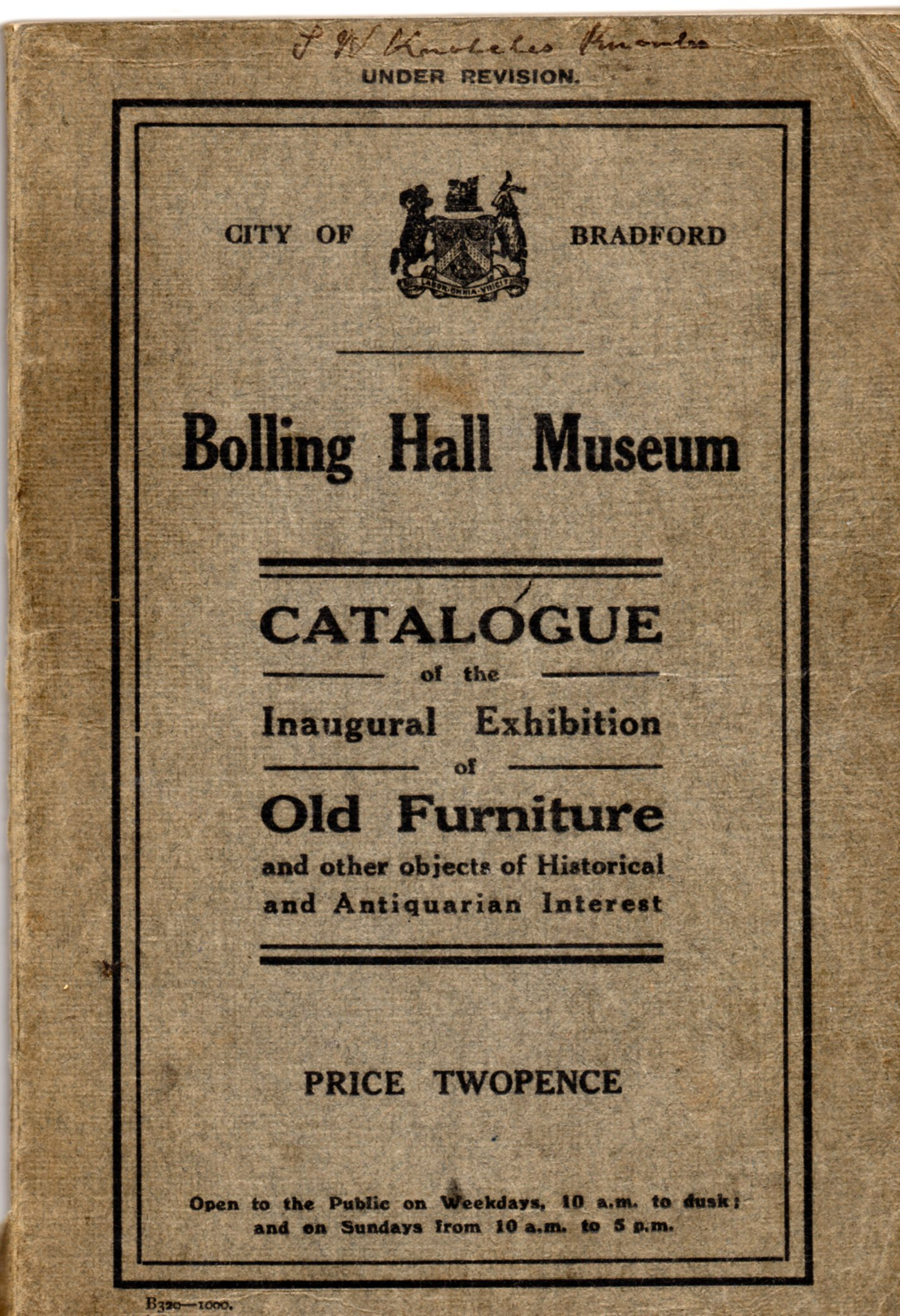
Cover of the first catalogue of Bolling Hall museum. 1914

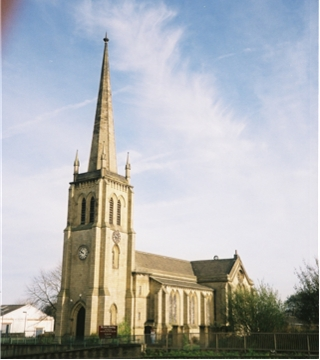
St John's Church Bowling. Built 1844

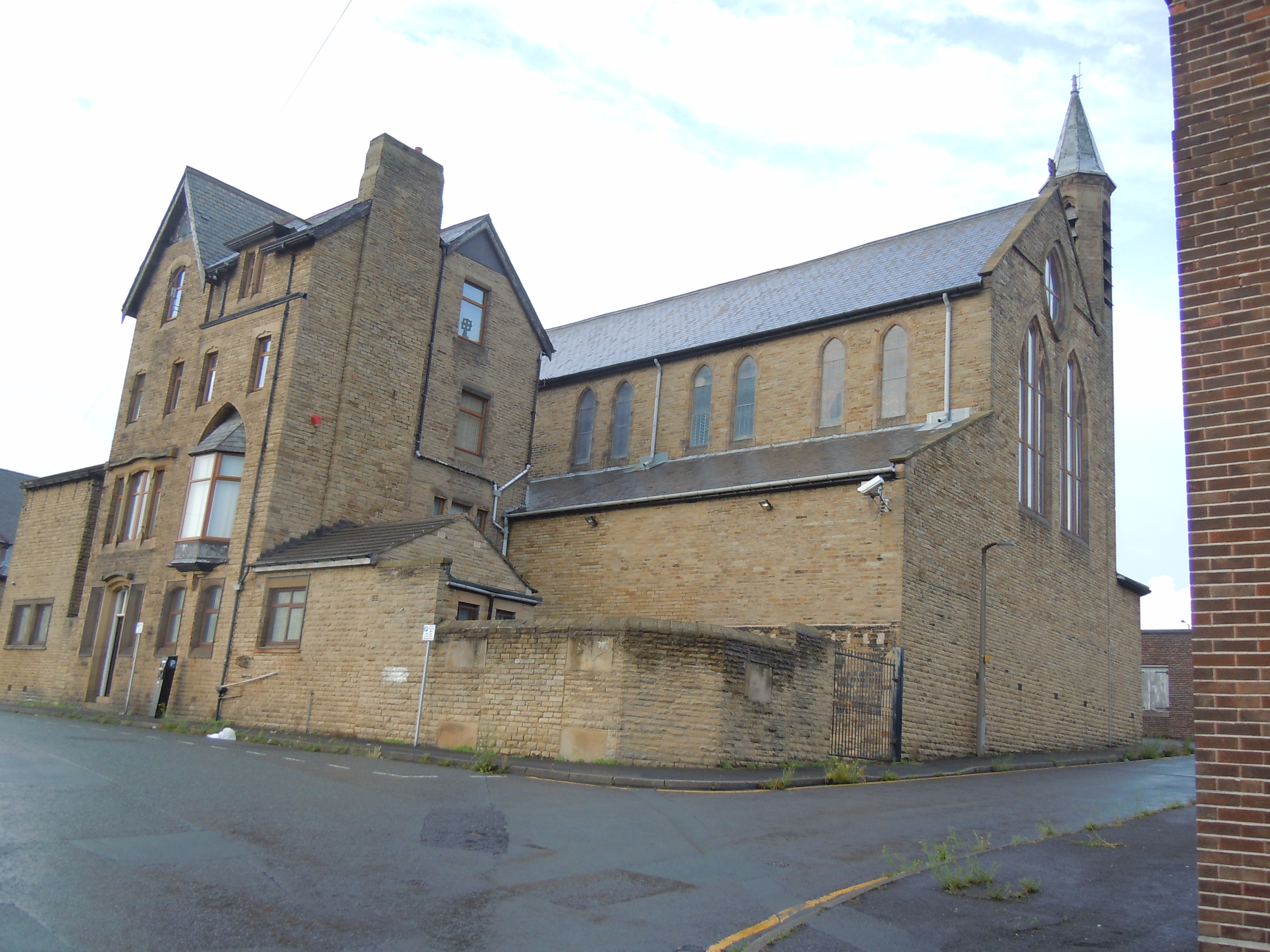
St Ann's (RC) church, presbytery and school.

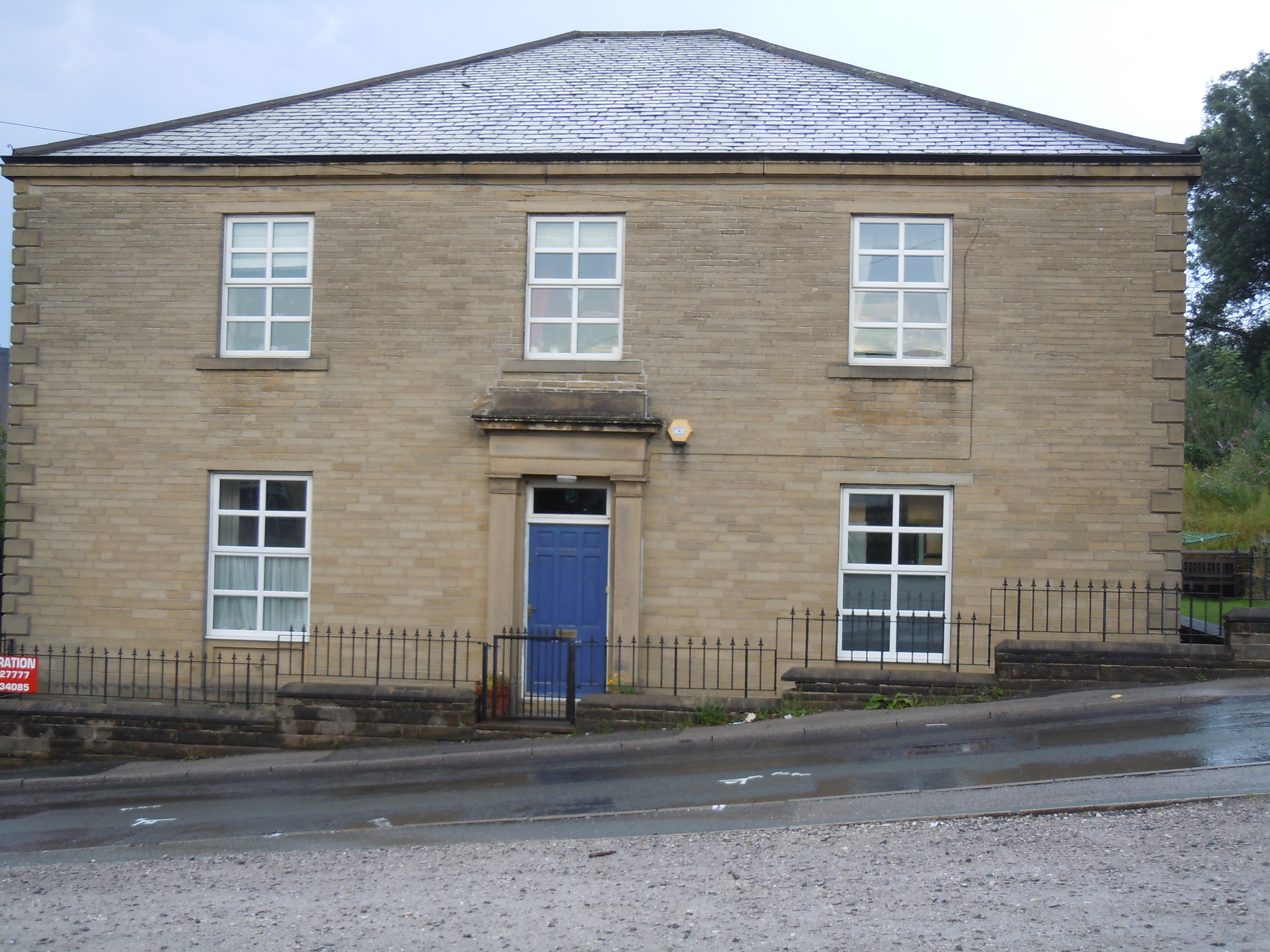
14.2 Middle class villa No. 237 Hall Lane built c 1851

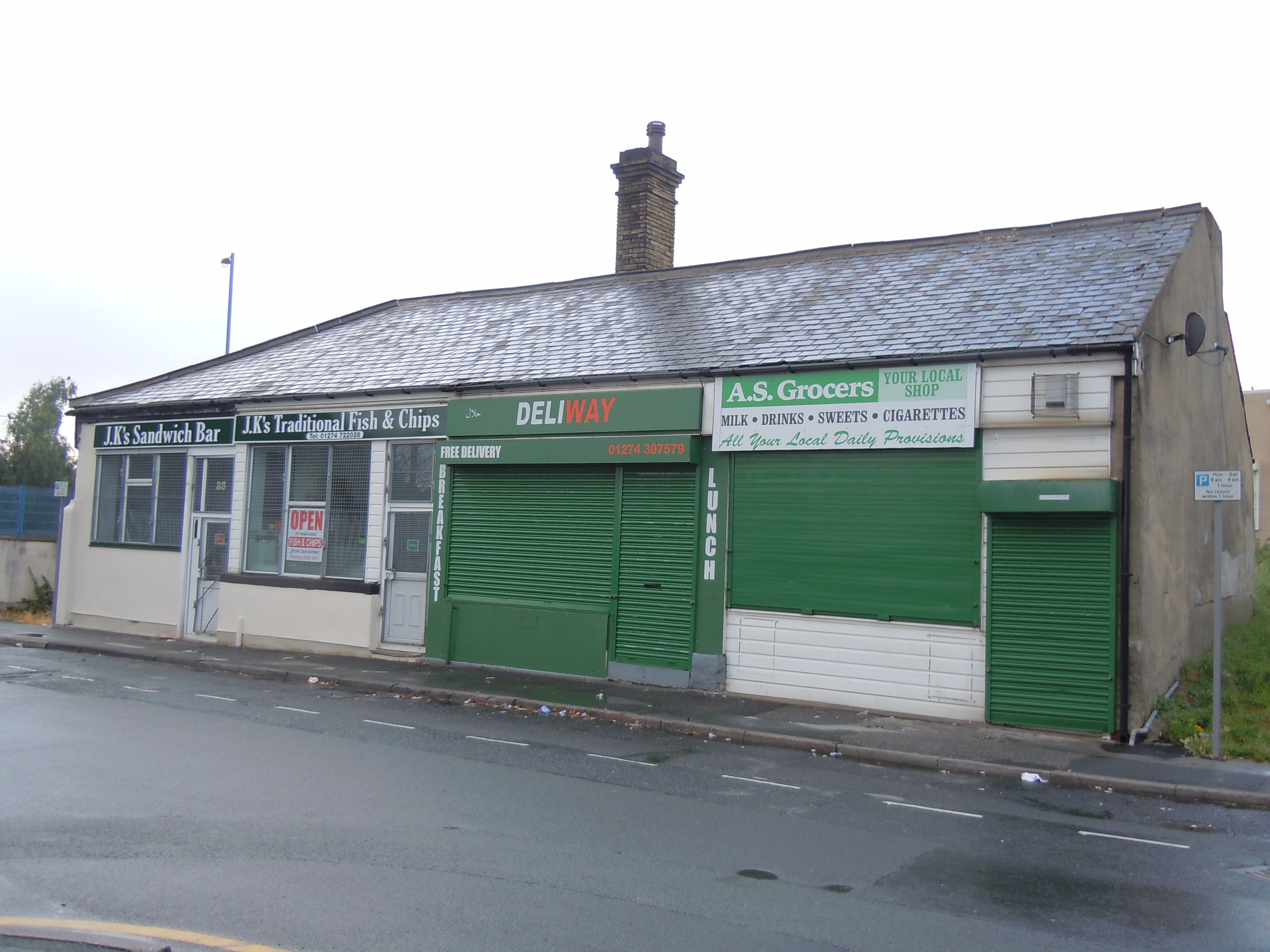
Coal miner's cottages in Hall Lane built c 1800.

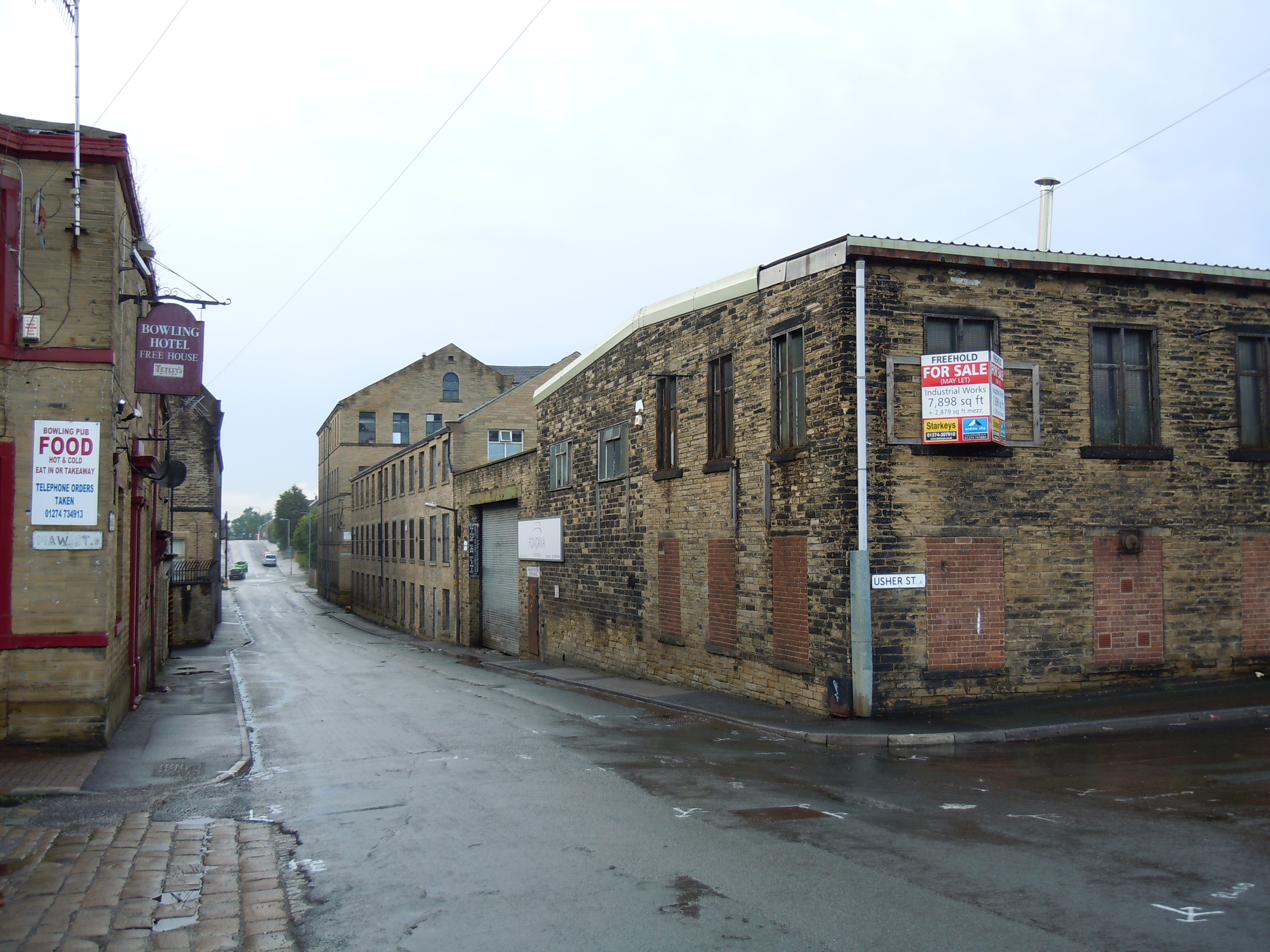
13.1. (left) Ladywell (right) Hall Lane & Globe mills

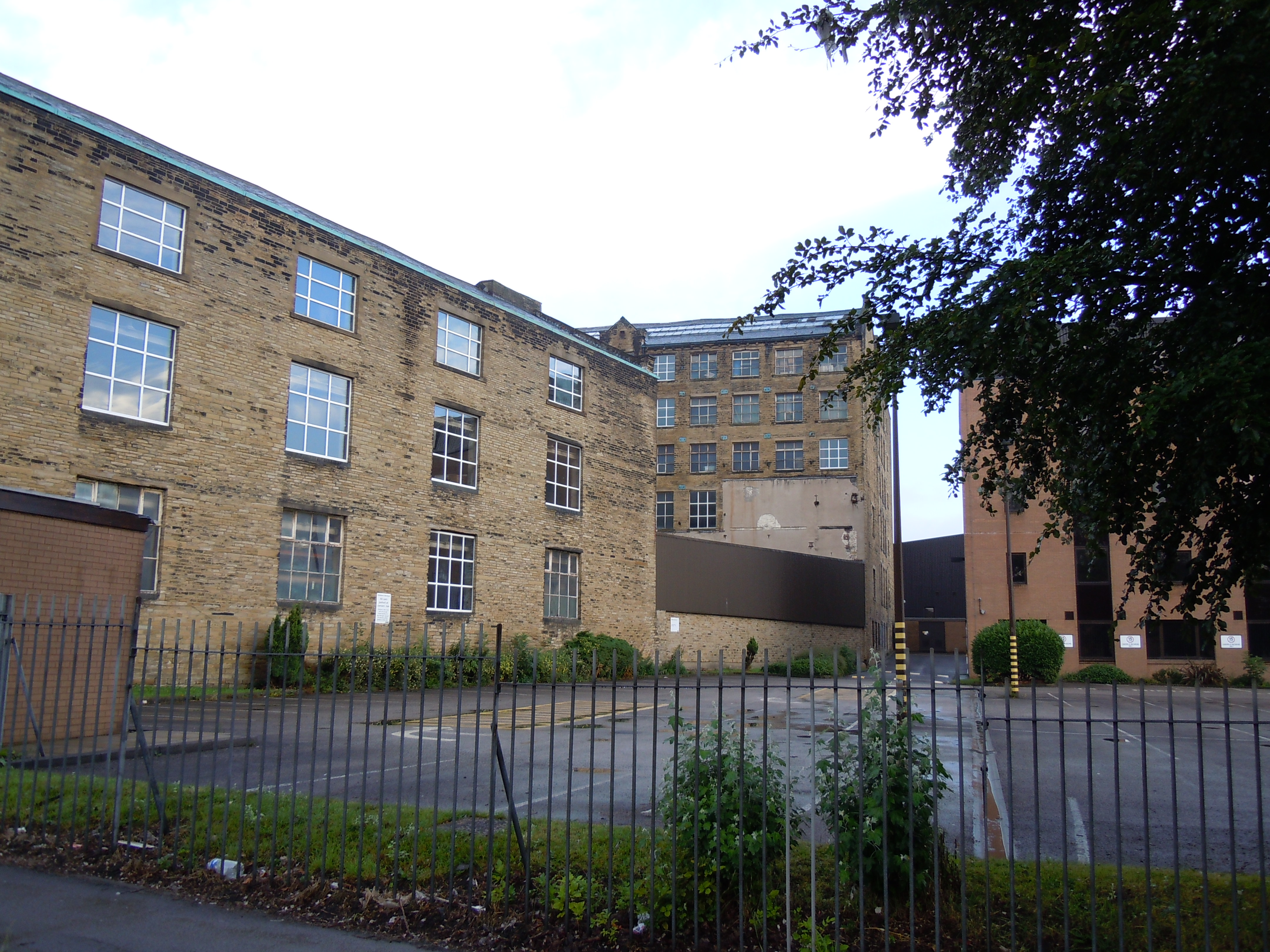
13.2 Site of the Lady Well and Ladywell mills

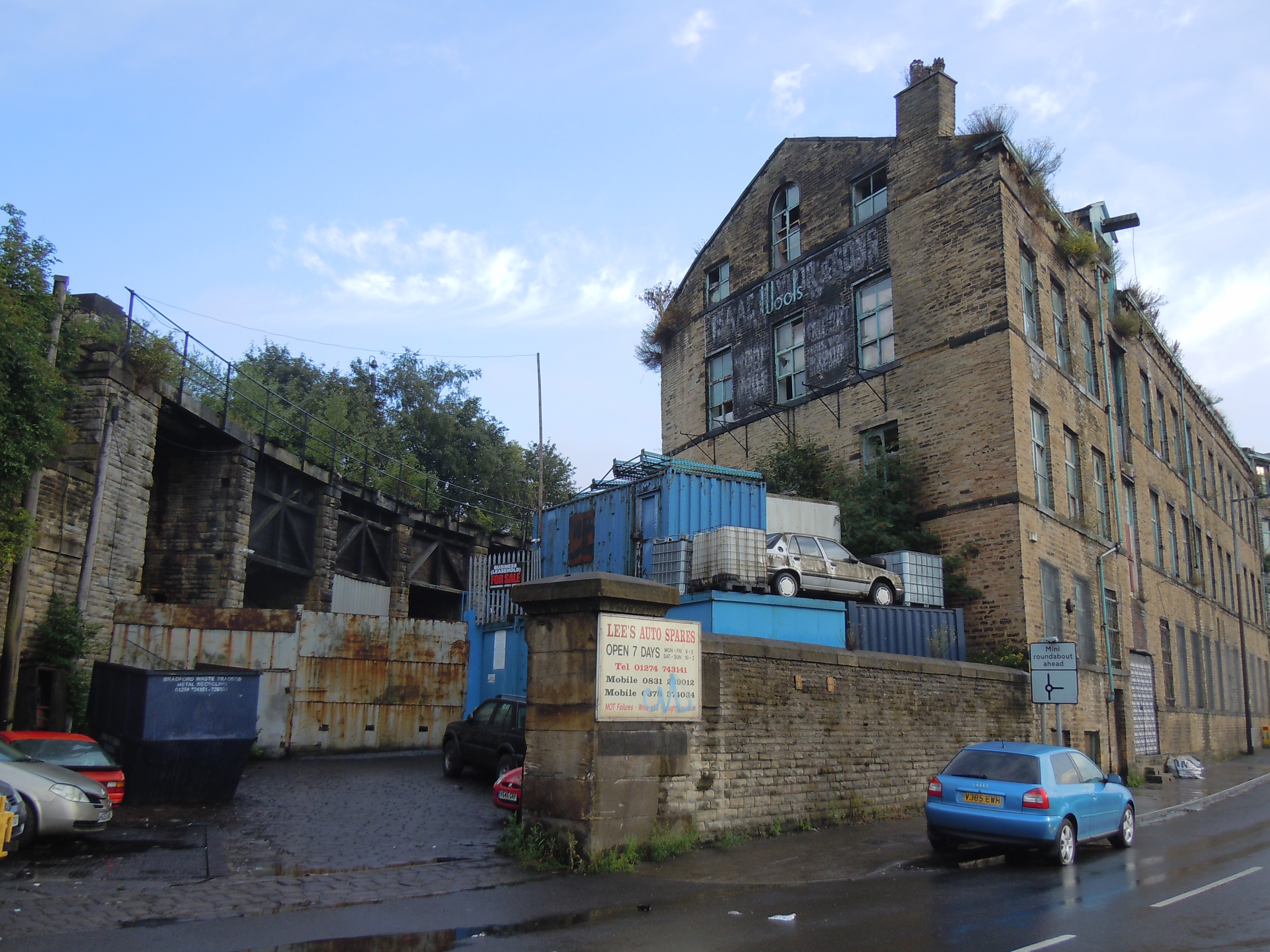
13.3 Ivy Mills and coal drops on the site of Bowling corn mills.

== Transport links ==
East Bowling lies approximately 1 mile north-east from the end of the M606 motorway. Public Transport is provided by the 635 TLC Transport service to and from Bradford Interchange, also connecting with Morrisons Supermarket, Mayo Avenue (BD5), and in the evenings, First Bradford service 621 to Haworth Road via Bradford City Centre.

== Notable residents ==
- John Wroe (1800–1863) – self-proclaimed religious leader, was born in East Bowling
- Zayn Malik (born 1993) – former member of boyband One Direction and current solo artist
- Gareth Gates (born 1984) – singer-songwriter and actor

== Sources of information and bibliography ==
- Bradford Libraries and East Bowling History Workshop. 1978 "Bowling Tidings"
- Caffyn, Lucy (1986) Worker's Houses in West Yorkshire 1750–1920. HMSO ISBN 0 11 300002 2
- Cudworth, William (1882) Historical Notes on the Bradford Corporation. Republished Old Bradfordian Press
- Cudworth, William (1888) Worstedopolis .Republished Old General Books Memphis
- Cudworth, William (1891) Histories of Bolton and Bowling. Thomas Brear & Co Bradford
- Cudworth, William (1891) Condition of the Industrial Classes. Collected articles from the Bradford Observer. Republished by Mountain Press 1977
- Firth, Gary (1990) Bradford and the Industrial Revolution. Ryburn Publishing ISBN 1-85331-010-7
- Green, Edward (2005) Prophet John Wroe - Virgins, Scandals and Visions. Sutton Publishing Group ISBN 0 7509 4077 8
- James, David (1990) Bradford. Ryburn Publishing ISBN 978-1-85331-005-8
- James, John (1841) The History and Topography of Bradford, Longmans. Republished Mountain Press 1967 Centenary edition.
- James, John (1866) Continuations and Additions to The History of Bradford, Longmans. Republished E.J Morten 1973. ISBN 0 901598 69 0
- Jennings, Paul (1995) The Public House in Bradford 1770–1970, Keele University Press. ISBN 9781853311130
- Jennings, Paul (2004) Bradford Pubs. The History Press. ISBN 9780752433028
- Jowitt J. A. (editor) (1986) Model Industrial Communities in Mid Nineteenth Century Yorkshire. University of Bradford. ISBN 1 85143 016 4
- Jowitt J. A.& Wright D.G (editors) (1986) Victorian Bradford. University of Bradford. ISBN 0-907734-01-4
- Pickles, Derek (1966) The Bowling Tramways. Unpublished dissertation available at http://www.keepandshare.com/doc/3499098/bowling-tramways-doc-january-30-2012
- Richardson C. (1976) A Geography of Bradford. University of Bradford ISBN 0 901945 19 6
- Scruton, William (1889) Pen and Pencil Sketches of Old Bradford. Republished Mountain Press 1968
- Sheeran, George (1986) Good Houses Built of Stone . Allenwood Books ISBN 0 947963 03 0
- Sheeran, George (1990) The Victorian Houses of Bradford. Bradford Libraries ISBN 0-907734-21-9 (First published in 1986 in volume 2, pp. 47–53, of the third series of The Bradford Antiquary, the journal of the Bradford Historical and Antiquarian Society)
- Shepherd, Val (1994) Historic Wells in and Around Bradford. Heart of Albion Press. ISBN 1 872883 31 1
- Thornhill, John (1986) "All Change – Bradford's through railway scheme"' Bradford Antiquary 3rd series vol. 02 1986. Available at https://web.archive.org/web/20140714152803/http://www.bradfordhistorical.org.uk/antiquary/third/vol02/allchange.html
- Walker, R. L. (2008) When was Ripleyville Built? SEQUALS, ISBN 0 9532139 2 7

== See also ==
- Listed buildings in Bradford (Bowling and Barkerend Ward)
