= Listed buildings in Windhill and Wrose =

Windhill and Wrose is a ward, and Wrose is a civil parish, both in the metropolitan borough of the City of Bradford, West Yorkshire, England. The ward and parish contain ten listed buildings that are recorded in the National Heritage List for England. Of these, two are listed at Grade II*, the middle of the three grades, and the others are at Grade II, the lowest grade. The listed buildings consist of houses and cottages, a school later used for other purposes, and a public house.

== Key ==
Grade	Criteria
II*	Particularly important buildings of more than special interest
II	Buildings of national importance and special interest

== Buildings ==
Name and location	Photograph	Date	Notes	Grade
3 and 5 Snowden Road, Wrose; 53.82918°N 1.75928°W		1616	A pair of stone houses that have a stone slate roof with coped gables. There are two storeys and a continuous outshut at the rear. The windows are mullioned with some mullions removed, and some with hood moulds, and above one window is a dated and initialled tablet. On the front is a 19th-century doorway, and in the right return is a doorway with plain jambs and a massive triangular chamfered lintel.	II
Bolton Old Hall; 53.82259°N 1.74879°W		1627	A timber framed hall house encased in gritstone and later remodelled, it has a stone slate roof. In the south front of the hall range is a mullioned and transomed window with later semi-dormers above. The gabled wing to the left has similar windows and an upright oval window in the apex. In the west front is a doorway with a cornice hood, and the north front contains a doorway over which is an inscribed and dated panel.	II*
Bolton Old Hall Cottage; 53.82270°N 1.74871°W	—	Early to mid 17th century	Originally the east wing of Bolton Old Hall, it is timber framed and encased in gritstone, and has a stone slate roof with shaped kneelers. The doorway has a plain surround, and the windows either have a single light, or are mullioned.	II*
24 and 28 Towngate, Wrose; 53.82967°N 1.76077°W	—	Early 18th century	A pair of stone houses with quoins, and a stone slate roof with chamfered gable copings and moulded kneelers. There are two storeys, two inserted doorways, and the windows are mullioned with some mullions removed, and most with hood moulds.	II
6 Wood Top, Windhill; 53.83681°N 1.75926°W	—	Late 18th century	A stone house with quoins, and a stone slate roof with coped gables and kneelers. There are two storeys, a symmetrical front of three bays, and a later porch on the right return. Above the central doorway is a former two-light window with the mullion removed, and the other windows are mullioned with three lights.	II
33 and 35 Snowden Road, Wrose; 53.82943°N 1.76025°W	—	Late 18th century	A house later divided, it is in stone with quoins, and a stone slate roof with a coped gable and a moulded kneeler on the right. There are two storeys and two bays. The central doorway has a chamfered surround, and there is an inserted 19th-century doorway to its left. The windows are mullioned with three lights, and over the central doorway is a re-set dated and initialled tablet.	II
White Bear Public House; 53.83728°N 1.73337°W	—	Late 18th or early 19th century	The public house is in sandstone with a stone slate roof. There are two storeys, and the gable end faces the street. In the gable end is a doorway with pilasters and a cornice on brackets, and sash windows, and in the south front are two-light mullioned windows.	II
7 Thackley Old Road, Windhill; 53.83633°N 1.76256°W	—	Early to mid 19th century	A pair of cottages combined into one house, it is in stone, and has a stone slate roof with a coped gable on the left. There are two storeys, two bays, and a lean-to extension on the left. The doorways are in the centre, and the windows are mullioned with three lights.	II
15 Leeds Road, walls and gate piers, Windhill; 53.83454°N 1.76781°W	—	Mid to late 19th century	Originally a school with the master's house incorporated on the left and later used for other purposes, it is in stone with a Welsh slate roof. There is one storey and an attic, and a front of five bays, the outer bays projecting and gabled. In the left bay is a canted bay window, and in the right bay is a large four-light window with Decorated tracery. Adjoining the right bay is a porch with an embattled parapet. In front of the forecourt is a low stone wall containing two pairs of gate piers with gabled tops, and iron railings with fleur-de-lis finials.	II
15 Leeds Road, part to the east, Windhill; 53.83461°N 1.76749°W	—	Mid to late 19th century	Originally part of a school and later used for other purposes, it is in stone with a Welsh slate roof. There is one storey and one bay, and the gable end faces the road. In the gable end is a large four-light window with Decorated tracery. On the front is a gabled entrance containing an arched doorway and with a trefoil in the apex, and to its left is a square porch with a hood mould.	II
