= Dudley Hill =

Village in West Yorkshire, England

Coordinates: 53.772584°N 1.719918°W

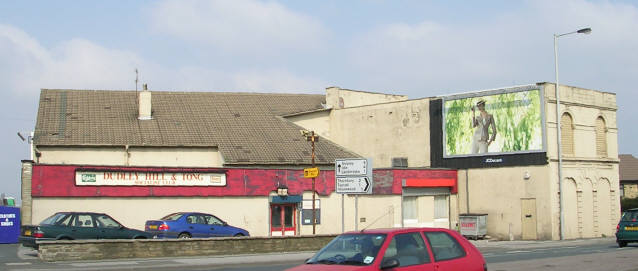
- Dudley Hill & Tong Socialist Club

- Location within West Yorkshire
- Metropolitan borough: City of Bradford
- Metropolitan county: West Yorkshire
- Region: Yorkshire and the Humber
- Country: England
- Sovereign state: United Kingdom
- Post town: Bradford
- Postcode district: BD4
- Dialling code: 01274
- Police: West Yorkshire
- Fire: West Yorkshire
- Ambulance: Yorkshire

Dudley Hill is a village in the borough of City of Bradford, West Yorkshire, England and is in Tong ward.

== History ==
There are a few mentions of the name Dudley Hill prior to the Industrial Revolution.

=== Religious history ===
John Wesley (1703–1791) visited Dudley Hill in 1744. The Wesleyan Sunday School opened in 1816, the Wesleyan Chapel in 1823 and the Ebenezer Primitive Methodists Chapel opened in 1833, and in 1861 Salem Chapel opened on Sticker Lane.

=== Industrial history ===
To the north Bowling Iron Works was founded in 1788. Terry's Mill opened in 1823, and Albion Mill, and Perseverance Mill appeared after 1850. Industry Mill was destroyed in a fire in 1890 but rebuilt in brick. In 1935 Jubilee Mills opened.

=== Transport history ===
Dudley Hill was at the junction of three turnpikes: the Cutler Heights to Bradford turnpike (1740) down Rooley Lane; the Bradford to Wakefield turnpike (1752) and Dudley Hill, Killinghall and Harrogate turnpike (1804) along Sticker Lane.

Dudley Hill railway station was opened in 1856 with a new larger station in 1875. The passenger service ended in 1952 and it was closed to freight in 1979.

In 1903 electric trams came to Dudley Hill. In 1911 Britain's first trolleybus service commenced operation between Laisterdyke and Dudley Hill. The service stopped in 1972, the last trolleybus service in the UK.

=== Commercial history ===
The 600 seat Picture Palace cinema on Tong Street was designed for Walter Goodall (1868–1933) by architects Howorth & Howorth of Cleckheaton and opened in 1912 – the cinema closed in 1967 and became a Bingo club, and then a carpet and bedroom furniture salesroom. In 2016 it was designated a Grade II listed building by Historic England. It is the only listed building in Dudley Hill. The UK headquarters of Hallmark Cards is in Dudley Hill, having moved there from Bingley.

== Landmarks ==
Dudley Hill has a police station, call centre, post office and a medical centre. There is also a wide range of independent shops, a pub, Iceland, Wynsors World of Shoes, Poundstretcher, Pet City, Superdrug, a Gala Bingo, and a range of takeaways.

== Education ==
The Bierley National School was built in 1870, Lorne Street School in 1874 and Dudley Hill School in 1878.

Dudley Hill First School and a high school are situated on Tong Street.

== Sport ==
The Bradford Dudley Hill Rugby League Club is on Lower Lane.
