= Belle Vue Girls' Academy =

Girls' school in Bradford, West Yorkshire, England

Location
- Thorn Lane; Bradford, West Yorkshire, BD9 6NA; England
- Coordinates: 53.8201°N 1.8132°W

Information
- Type: Academy
- Established: 1887
- Local authority: Bradford
- Department for Education URN: 138087 Tables
- Ofsted: Reports
- Head of school: Mary Copeland
- Gender: Girls
- Age: 11 to 18
- Enrolment: 1200
- Houses: Bronte, Curie, Ebadi, McMillian, Parks and Sanderson
- Colours: Yellow, Purple, Orange, Red, Blue and Green
- Website: https://bvgacademy.co.uk/

Belle Vue Girls' Academy (formerly Belle Vue Girls' School) is a girls' secondary school and sixth form located in Bradford, West Yorkshire, England.

== History ==
The school was founded in 1877 as The Girls' Higher Grade School, on Manningham Lane. In 1904, the name was changed to Belle Vue Girls' Secondary School. During the First World War, the school offered additional evening classes for women who worked during the day in the factories. During the Second World War, the army briefly occupied the building, and the students were sent elsewhere. The school was moved to its present site in 1971, with Margaret Thatcher in attendance at the opening ceremony.

In 2008 Belle Vue Girls School became a Specialist in Languages and a Science College.

In 2011, there were nearly 1200 students on roll and nearly 300 in the Sixth form. The school has now been extended and there are eight new classrooms and a dance studio.

Previously a community school administered by City of Bradford Metropolitan District Council, in April 2012 Belle Vue Girls' School converted to academy status and was renamed Belle Vue Girls' Academy. The school is now sponsored by the Bradford Diocesan Academies Trust.

== See also ==
- Beckfoot Upper Heaton (formerly Belle Vue Boys' School)
