= Wrose =

Village and civil parish in West Yorkshire, England

Coordinates: 53.82791°N 1.75206°W

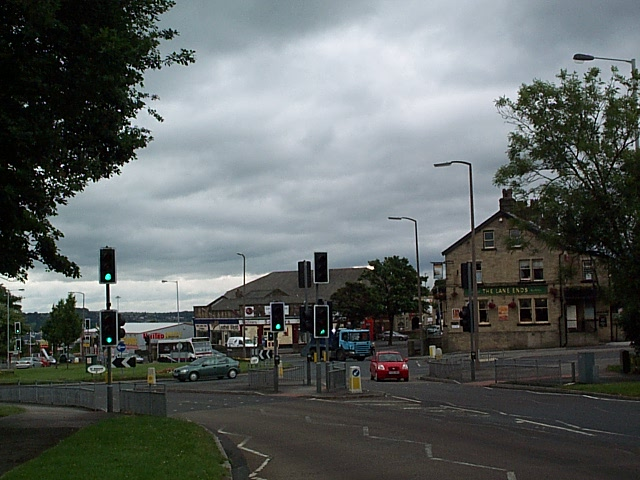
- Five Lane Ends

- Location within West Yorkshire
- Population: 7,518 (2011 census)
- Metropolitan borough: City of Bradford
- Metropolitan county: West Yorkshire
- Region: Yorkshire and the Humber
- Country: England
- Sovereign state: United Kingdom
- Post town: SHIPLEY
- Postcode district: BD18
- Dialling code: 01274
- Police: West Yorkshire
- Fire: West Yorkshire
- Ambulance: Yorkshire

Wrose is a village and civil parish in the City of Bradford metropolitan borough of West Yorkshire, England, about three miles north of Bradford city centre, and southeast of Shipley. Wrose is in the Windhill and Wrose ward. The civil parish population taken at the 2011 Census was 7,518.

== History ==
Although the name Wrose was established as a place name within the Manor of Idle by the time of Elizabeth I of England, it is not mentioned in the Poll Tax returns of 1379. The name probably existed as a place name for some time before then.

Rapid house expansion took place in Wrose in the 1930s. Many houses dating from the time of Charles II were demolished to make way for these new semi-detached properties.

Close to the old quarries to the north west of Wrose was the former Wrose Hill brickworks created for the manufacture of bricks and sanitary tubes.

== Geography ==
Wrose sits on top of a hillside at a height of around 600-foot (180 m) above sea level, overlooking the Aire valley and Bradford valley. Wrose is surrounded by other areas of Shipley and Bradford such as Windhill, Woodend, West Royd, Idle Moor, Gaisby and Owlet.

Around the hillside (Carr Hill) can be found the remains of many stone quarries, whose growth exploded in the 19th century as the city of Bradford grew with the wool trade. Many of Bradford's fine Yorkshire millstone buildings are built from these resources. A quarry at nearby Bolton Woods still operates today. The geology of the area is that of mudstones, siltstones, fine sandstones, coal, pipeclay, fireclay and ganister as indicated by exposed rocks in the old quarry—parts of which are in a dangerous state. Part of the quarry was turned into a wetland in 2024.

== Governance ==
Wrose has been a civil parish since 2004 and is entirely surrounded by unparished areas of the City of Bradford.

== Landmarks ==
Churches in Wrose include St Cuthbert's Church, Bolton Villas United Reform Church on Wrose Road and Wrose Chapel on Low Ash Avenue. The local post office is on Wrose Road. Also on Wrose Road are Wrose's two public houses, The Bold Privateer and Wrose Bull. The Bold Privateer is named after the Earl of Cumberland who owned all the land in the Wrose area in the time of Elizabeth I of England. The present-day Wrose Bull was originally named The Hare and Hounds after its move to new premises, but at the insistence of locals was renamed for the colloquial name of the original alehouse. There are listed buildings in Wrose on Snowden Road and Tudor Barn Court.

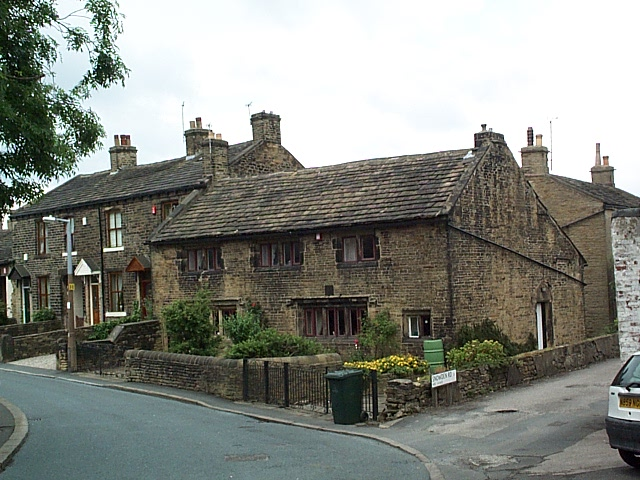
Listed 17th century house, Snowden Road, Wrose

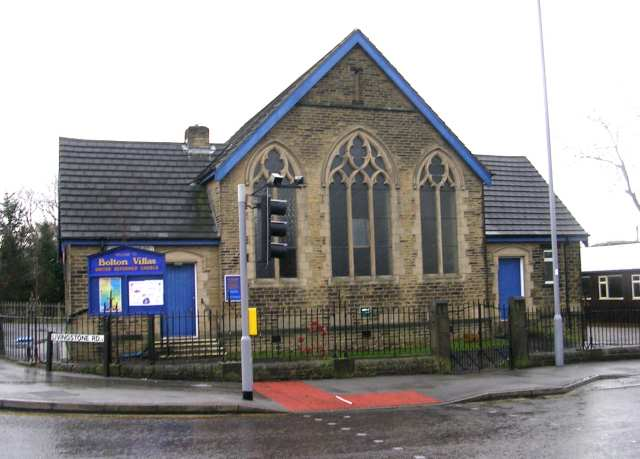
Bolton Villas United Reform Church

== Economy ==
Wrose is a largely residential area and there are a number of shops along Wrose Road in Wrose.

== Education ==
Low Ash Primary School is to be found on Wrose Road close to the centre of Wrose.

== Transport ==
Wrose is served by a number of West Yorkshire Transport's bus services.

== Notable residents ==
Wrose was home to the Yorkshire sporting family the Jowets, of which the last and most notable member was Dawson Jowet, founder of the Airedale beagles hunting pack in 1891, and its Master until his death in 1933. His monument remains on Ilkley Moor. Adrian Edmondson comic actor, writer, musician and director, was born in Wrose but grew up in nearby Idle. In 2019, Wrose Parish Council funded a blue plaque to be placed on the birthplace of Malachi Whitaker in Clara Road. The Yorkshire & Humber MEP Richard Corbett , Labour's Leader in the European Parliament, lived in Wrose.

See also

- Listed buildings in Windhill and Wrose
