= Bowling Tunnel =

Railway tunnel in West Yorkshire, England

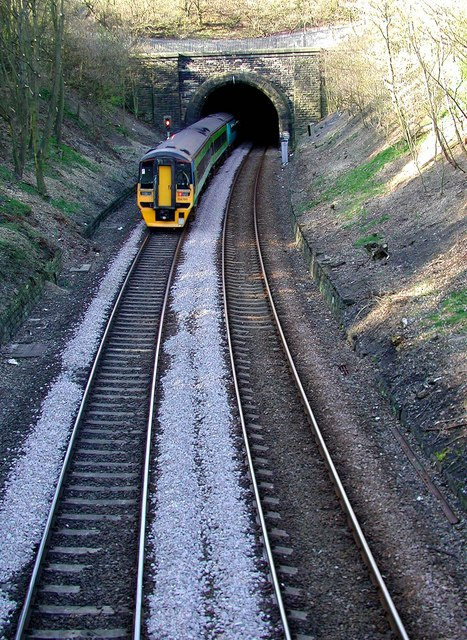
- Bowling Tunnel south portal

Overview
- Line: Calder Valley line
- Location: Bowling, Bradford, West Yorkshire, England
- Coordinates: 53.770°N 1.748°W
- Status: Open

Operation
- Opened: 9 May 1850
- Owner: Network Rail
- Traffic: Passenger

Technical
- Design engineer: John Hawkshaw
- Length: 1,648 yards (1,507 m)
- No. of tracks: 2
- Track gauge: 4 ft 8 1/2 in (1,435 mm) standard gauge
- Grade: 1-in-400 (northwards)

Bowling Tunnel is a railway Tunnel on the Calder Valley line, south of Bradford in West Yorkshire, England. The Tunnel was completed in 1850 after some difficulty in construction, and allowed trains from the south to access the second railway terminus in the town of Bradford. The Tunnel remains open to railway traffic with trains between Halifax and Bradford Interchange using it.

== History ==
A tunnel through the hill at Bowling was first suggested for a line linking Leeds with Bradford in 1843. George Stephenson advised against this line due to the presence of old coal workings in the hill, which would hinder progress and allow water ingress from old mines. A line between Halifax and Bradford, as part of the Manchester & Leeds Railway, was proposed in 1840s and by the time the line was built, it was under the Lancashire & Yorkshire Railway.

The contractors for the tunnel, John Moulson & Son, were based at Bowling, and during the construction process, over 3,424,000 cubic feet (97,000 m^{3}) of earth had been removed with ten shafts built downwards to dig the tunnel out. The tunnel was completed on 22 March 1850, and three shafts were left in-situ to help vent steam from the tunnel, the deepest shaft being 65 feet (20 m) deep. Two deaths were attributed to the building of the tunnel, with the local press marvelling that more were not killed, such was the undertaking. The engineer for the project was John Hawkshaw.

On 19 April 1850, the government inspector travelled over the line through the tunnel and he approved the construction for opening on 1 May 1850, The first revenue earning traffic through the tunnel to Bradford Drake Street (later renamed Exchange), did not go through until 9 May 1850. Until the tunnel was opened, railway traffic terminated at Low Moor, and passengers were conveyed to Bradford in a horse-drawn carriage. One statistic that emerged at the time was that the tunnel was long enough to hold over 128,000 people, which is more than the number of people that lived in Bradford at that time. Just outside of the northern portal, was the Bowling Junction station, which provided access to the Leeds, Bradford and Halifax's railway line to Leeds via Stanningley. The station closed in December 1951 and the line remained open for trains avoiding the reversal at Bradford Interchange until September 1985. It became a long siding to Bowling Junction with no access to Laisterdyke railway station at its eastern end.

The tunnel is 1,648 yards (1,507 m) (or 73 chains (4,800 ft; 1,500 m)) long and is orientated in a north–south direction. The gradient in the tunnel falls at 1-in-400 northwards, towards Bradford Interchange station. In 1973, the M606 motorway was opened, which has its terminal roundabout on top of Bowling Tunnel.

== Accidents ==
- 6 May 1859 – a train ran into the back another some 200 yards (180 m) from the south tunnel mouth (listed as west in the accident report).
- 7 March 1867 – a Bradford to Huddersfield train broke down in the tunnel, and a following train, from Leeds to Manchester, was incorrectly allowed to proceed into the tunnel. The guard of the stranded train managed to shout a warning, however a collision took place driving the stationary train forward some 80 yards (73 m). The driver of the first train died – he had been under his engine trying to repair it, and a passenger died four days later from his injuries. There were at least another 22 people with varying degrees of injury. The signalman at the Bowling end of the tunnel was found to have been derelict in his duty in allowing the second train into the tunnel.
- 24 October 1901 – the rear 16 wagons of a goods train travelling north through the tunnel, broke free, and remained in the tunnel. The static wagons were struck from behind by the following goods train, which pushed two wagons onto the opposite line, which were struck by a passenger train to Manchester. There were no casualties.
