= City (ward) =

Electoral ward in Bradford, England

Coordinates: 53.794°N 1.751°W

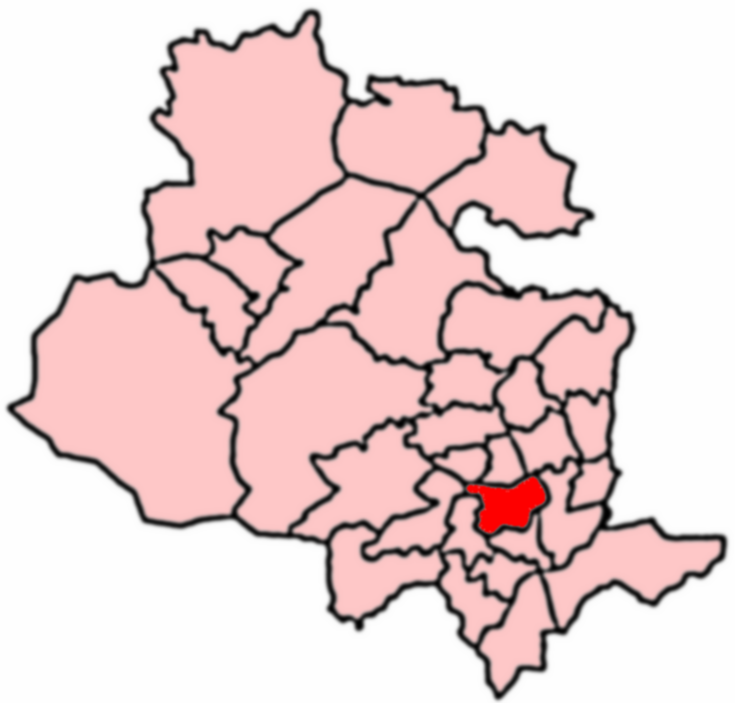
- 2004 Boundaries of City Ward
- UK Parliament: Bradford West
- Councillors: Nazam Azam (Labour); Shakeela Lal (Labour); Aneela Ahmed (Labour)

City is an electoral ward within the City of Bradford Metropolitan District Council.

City covers the centre of Bradford within the inner ring road and the areas of Shearbridge, Lister Hills, Brown Royd, Dirk Hill, Little Horton Green and part of Lidget Green all to the west of the commercial centre.

It is part of the Bradford West parliamentary constituency.

== Councillors ==
The ward is represented on Bradford Council by three Labour Party councillors, Nazam Azam, Shakeela Lal and Aneela Ahmed.

Election	Councillor	Councillor	Councillor
2004	Khadam Hussain (Con)	Jamshed Khan (Con)	Sajawal Hussain (Lab)
2006	Munir Ahmed (Lab)	Jamshed Khan (Con)	Sajawal Hussain (Lab)
2007	Munir Ahmed (Lab)	Shakeela Jan Lal (Lab)	Sajawal Hussain (Lab)
2008	Munir Ahmed (Lab)	Shakeela Lal (Lab)	Sajawal Hussain (Lab)
2010	Mohammed Nazam Azam (Lab)	Shakeela Lal (Lab)	Sajawal Hussain (Lab)
2011	Nazam Azam (Lab)	Shakeela Lal (Lab)	Sajawal Hussain (Lab)
2012	Nazam Azam (Lab)	Shakeela Lal (Lab)	Ruqayyah Collector (Respect)
October 2013	Nazam Azam (Lab)	Shakeela Lal (Lab)	Ruqayyah Collector (Ind)
2014	Nazam Azam (Lab)	Shakeela Lal (Lab)	Ruqayyah Collector (Ind)
March 2015	Nazam Azam (Lab)	Shakeela Lal (Lab)	Ruqayyah Collector (Respect)
May 2015	Nazam Azam (Lab)	Shakeela Lal (Lab)	Ruqayyah Collector (Respect)
2016	Nazam Azam (Lab)	Shakeela Lal (Lab)	Aneela Bano Ahmed (Lab)

indicates seat up for re-election. indicates councillor defection.
