= Beckfoot School =

Secondary school in West Yorkshire, England

Location
- Wagon Lane; Bingley, West Yorkshire, BD16 1EE; England; 53.84138°N 1.82917°W

Information
- Type: Academy
- Department for Education URN: 139975 Tables
- Ofsted: Reports
- Chair: John Winkley
- Headteacher: Simon Wade
- Gender: Coeducational
- Age: 11 to 18
- Enrolment: 1,700
- Colour: Blue/Black
- Publication: Beckfoot Buzz
- Website: http://www.beckfoot.org

Beckfoot School is a coeducational secondary school and sixth form with academy status, in Bingley, West Yorkshire, England.

The school has previously gained Technology College status, specialist school status in the Arts, Artsmark Gold and a Sportsmark Award. It also has a Charter Mark for services to the community and is a City Learning Centre. The school converted to academy status in August 2013. In December 2016, the school received World Class Schools Quality Mark. It is one of the three first schools in northern England to get the status.

Beckfoot School is also a training school that has attained 'Investors in People' and a 'School Achievement Award'. The school moved into new, purpose-built, premises in June 2011 and the old buildings were demolished in 2012. The new premises are shared with Hazelbeck School.

The school has above-average A*–C grades in GCSEs.

== Sixth Form ==
In the 4 June 2014 Ofsted inspection, the Sixth Form was awarded Grade 1 (Outstanding) status. It offers students A Levels and BTEC national diploma. It has received controversy over the new uniform policy, students must wear suits, this includes both genders. Cultural clothing is banned as a result of it looking “too comfortable.”

== Beckfoot Trust ==
As an academy, Beckfoot School is the founding school of the Beckfoot Trust, a multi-academy trust. Hazelbeck School joined the trust in 2013, and Beckfoot Upper Heaton in 2015. Beckfoot Thornton joined in 2016.

The head of the Beckfoot Trust is David Horn, a former headteacher; his direct replacement, Gillian Halls, now also works for the Trust and was herself replaced by the current Headteacher Simon Wade.

== Notable former pupils ==
- Girls Aloud star Kimberley Walsh – attended the school under its previous name of Beckfoot Grammar School
- Georgina Roberts – England Ladies Rugby Union attended Beckfoot until 2002
- Footballer Danny Ward – attended the school
- Footballer James Hanson – attended the school from 1999 to 2004
- Katie Pattison-Hart – member of the first female crew of five to row the Atlantic
