= Girlington =

Area of Bradford in West Yorkshire, England

Coordinates: 53.803°N 1.802°W

- Location within West Yorkshire
- Metropolitan borough: City of Bradford
- Metropolitan county: West Yorkshire
- Region: Yorkshire and the Humber
- Country: England
- Sovereign state: United Kingdom
- Post town: BRADFORD
- Postcode district: BD8
- Dialling code: 01274
- Police: West Yorkshire
- Fire: West Yorkshire
- Ambulance: Yorkshire

Girlington is an area in Bradford, West Yorkshire, England. Girlington is located to the west of Bradford city centre. The majority population of Girlington are of South Asian origin, in particular Pakistani, Indian and Bangladeshi.

== History ==
The name is first recorded in 1412 and derives from an Old English personal name Gyrla with ing and tun. The stone-built Elite Cinema was constructed for the Elite Picture House Company at the junction of Fairbank Road and Toller Lane with a barrel vaulted ceiling and seating capacity for 700 – opening in 1913. The cinema closed in 1924 to enlarge the hall to 1,304 seats, reopening the next year. An electronic organ was installed in 1925 and sound in 1928. The cinema had a large stage for live performances but these ended during the Second World War. The cinema was sold to C & H Cinemas after the war and in the early 1950s the organ removed, the cinema refurbished and briefly supported live stage shows. Star Cinemas took over and installed a wide screen in 1954 but closed the cinema in 1968 – reopening as a bingo club. In 1986 the property was sold to become the Jamiyat Tabligh-Ul-Islam mosque but was partially destroyed by fire in 1987 and partially demolished. In the 1990s the auditorium was rebuilt but the building retained the original stone facade and entrance.

Opened in 1914 the stone-built Victoria Picture Palace was constructed on Thornton Road and was operated by Hibbert Pictures Ltd. The cinema was refurbished in 1927 and reopened as the New Victoria. In 1929 a British Talking Pictures sound system was installed, and by 1934 a Western Electric Sound system had been installed. In 1955 there was a serious fire after which the cinema was refurbished, and a CinemaScope wide screen installed while the seating capacity was further reduced. The cinema closed in 1961 and after a short period as a bingo hall the cinema was bought by Wm. Morrisons Ltd for conversion to a supermarket.

In 1961 Morrisons opened its first supermarket (Morrisons Victoria Supermarket) in the converted Victoria Cinema in Girlington. The cinema building was subsequently demolished and a nearby modern supermarket building replaces it.

Over the years a number of public houses and former hotels in Girlington have closed – The Craven Heifer (named for the eponymous Craven Heifer), The Girlington, The Shoulder of Mutton on Thornton Road, The George and The Royal on Kensington Street and The Travellers Rest (formerly known as the Tut 'n' Shive) on Duckworth Lane – only one pub now remains open.

== Landmarks ==
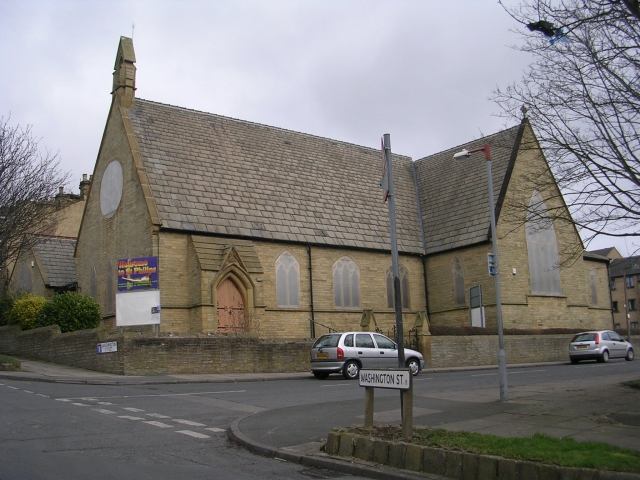
St Philip's Church

In the west of Girlington on West Park Road is West Park a small community park. There are areas for basketball, five-a-side football, and cricket, a bowling green, a fenced-in play area and a skatepark. Girlington has a community centre on Girlington Road and churches include Saint Chad's on St Chad's Road, and Saint Philip's on Thorn Street. Mosques include Jamiyat Tabligh ul Islam on Hoxton Street and Masjid E Umar on Durham road.

There are a number of listed buildings in Girlington - Rand's Almshouses (1876), a single storey range of almshouses with 2-storey wings, mill buildings within Whetley Mills, the Parish Church of Saint Chad (1912) on St Chad's Road, 80 and 82 Duckworth Lane.

== Economy ==
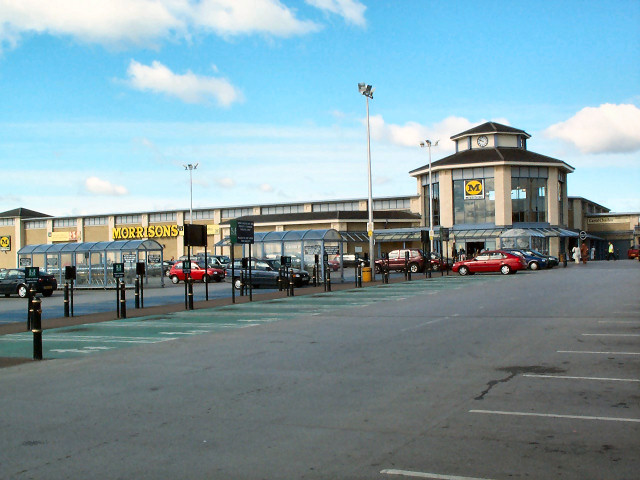
Morrisons Victoria

Around Ingleby Road is a shopping park consisting of shops and supermarkets such as Morrisons, Lidl, The Range, McDonald's, KFC, and Domino's Pizza. The area has a post office in Kensington Street.

== Education ==
Schools in the area include Girlington Primary School on Girlington Road, St Philip's Primary on Whitby Terrace and St William's Catholic Primary School on Young Street.

== Transport ==
The main roads through the area are the A6177 Ingleby Road - Whetley Lane part of the Bradford ring road, B6144 Toller Lane, and B6145 Thornton Road.

== Sport ==
Cricket is played at Girlington Cricket Club.
