= Barkerend =

Area of Bradford, West Yorkshire, England

Coordinates: 53.79453°N 1.73742°W

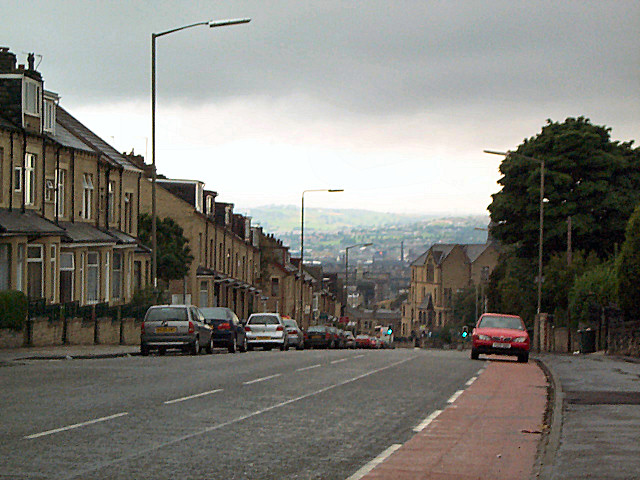
- Barkerend Road looking towards the city centre

- Location within West Yorkshire
- OS grid reference: SE1733
- Metropolitan borough: City of Bradford
- Metropolitan county: West Yorkshire
- Region: Yorkshire and the Humber
- Country: England
- Sovereign state: United Kingdom
- Post town: BRADFORD
- Postcode district: BD3
- Dialling code: 01274
- Police: West Yorkshire
- Fire: West Yorkshire
- Ambulance: Yorkshire

Barkerend is an inner-city area of Bradford, in West Yorkshire, England, east of the city centre and surrounded by Undercliffe Cemetery, Bradford Moor, Laisterdyke, Bowling, Broomfields, Little Germany and Wapping, including an area of modern housing known as Pollard Park.

== History ==
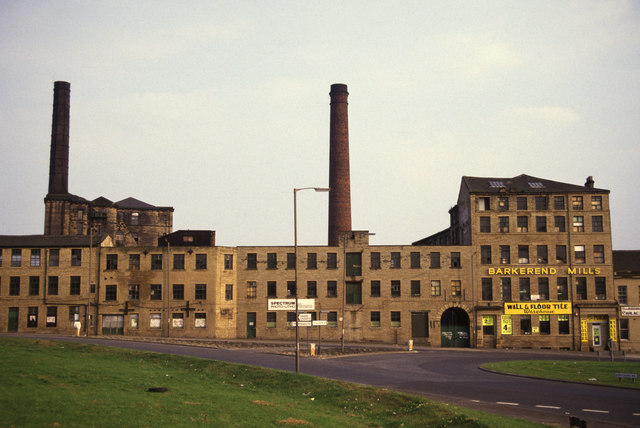
Barkerend Mills

Off Barkerend roundabout was the now partially demolished Barkerend Mills. These mills were established in 1815 as a steam powered worsted spinning mill. The street front buildings being warehouses with an arched gateway into the mill complex behind. More mills were added in 1852 and the last block (seen on the image left with chimney) still remains today, disused and minus the chimney.

The area had a number of cinemas including The Hippodrome Picturehouse / Roxy on Barkerend Road.

== Geography ==
The majority of Barkerend's population are of South Asian origin, in particular Pakistani, Bangladeshi and Afghan, and the area has high levels of unemployment and social and economic deprivation.

== Landmarks ==
Barkerend has a post office, community health centre, the Karmand Community Centre, and a Lidl supermarket. The Karmand Community Centre offers advice, education, training and recreational activities to the local community. Training is also offered by the Appleton House Training Centre on Barkerend Road.

There are a number of mosques in Barkerend including the Barkerend Road Mosque (Jamiyat Tabligh-ul-Islam) that was once the Hippodrome Picturehouse and Roxy. The imposing former Hanson Grammar School on Byron Street, off Barkerend Road were later to be occupied by Carlton Bolling School, and Pollard Park Middle School. These buildings are now the Byron Halls luxury flats. Hanson School itself moved to the Swain House area of Bradford between Bolton and Five Lane Ends, while Carlton Bolling became a college after moving to new premises in the north of Barkerend. Designed by Edward Prioleau Warren and built 1892–1894 in a neo-Gothic style with an octagonal corner clock turret, the grade II star listed St. Clement's Church^{*} on Barkerend Road is most notable for its ceiling decoration by Morris & Co.

The area has lost all but one of its public houses including the eponymous Barkerend on Barkerend Road and the historic Cock and Bottle pub. Listed buildings on Barkerend Road are the aforementioned Cock and Bottle public house, the Church of St. Mary and Presbytery, Barkerend Mills, Butler House, the Church of St. Clement, and numbers 181 and 214. On Byron Street is Boldshay Hall, Byron Halls and School House, Byron School and Olive School and on Hendford Drive there is Barkerend School and rear range.

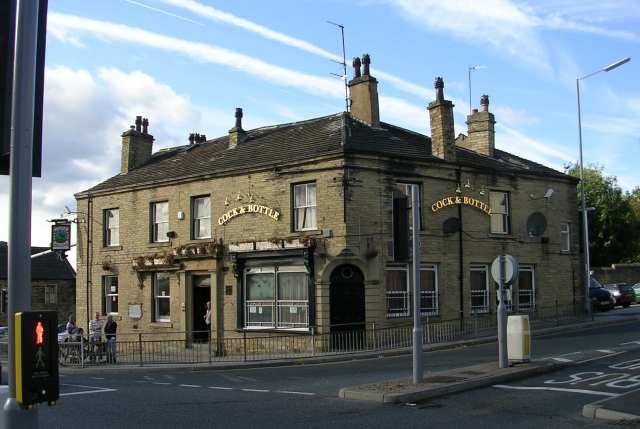
The historic Cock and Bottle^{*} pub

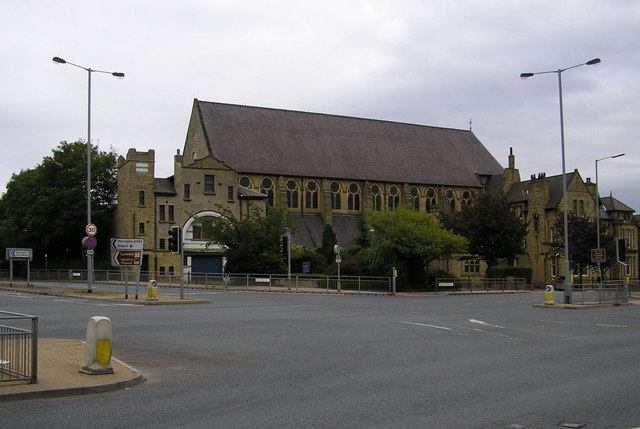
Church of St. Mary and Presbytery^{*}

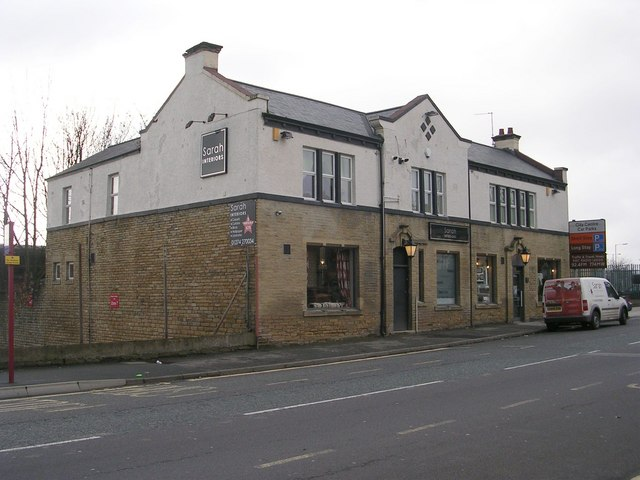
The former Barkerend pub

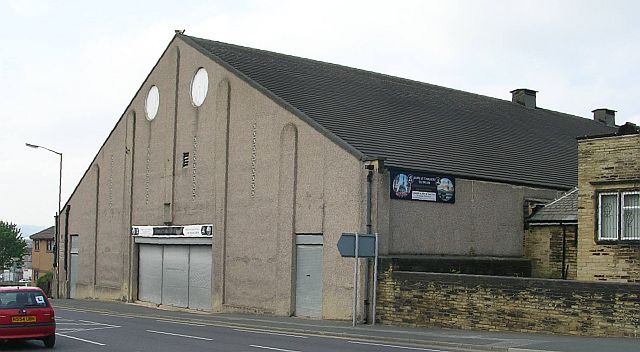
Barkerend Road Mosque

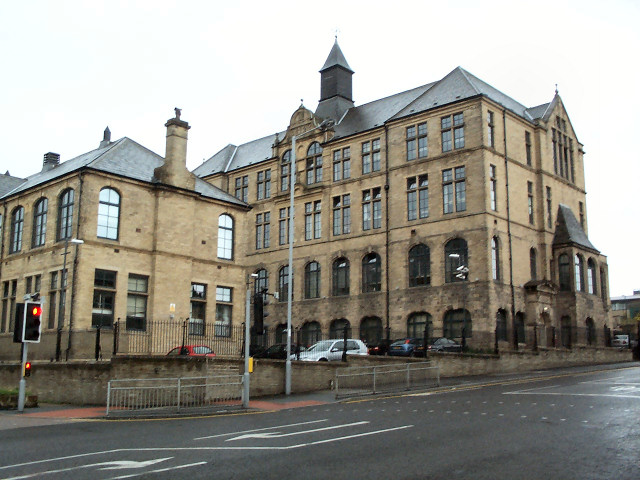
Byron Halls^{*} - Luxury flats

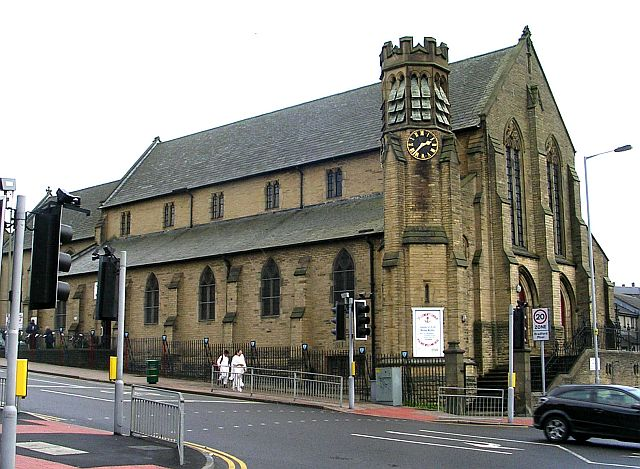
St. Clement's Church^{*}

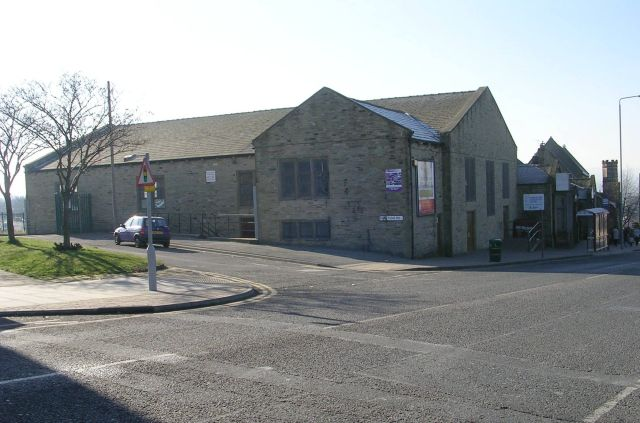
The Karmand Community Centre
^{*} listed building

== Transport ==
The A658 New Otley Road, A647 Leeds Road, and B6381 Barkerend Road run through Barkerend and the area is served by FirstGroup's Bradford X11, 611 and 670 bus services connecting Barkerend to surrounding areas.

== Education ==
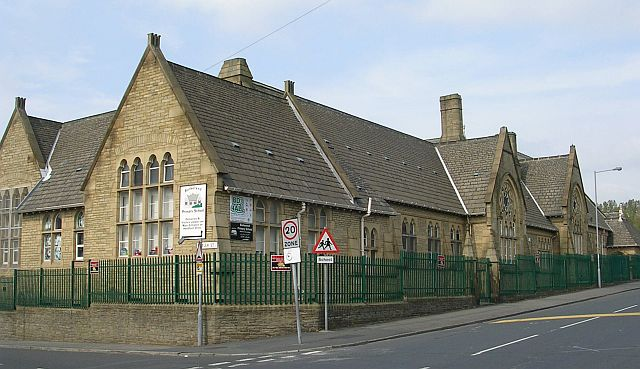
Barkerend Primary Leadership Academy

Barkerend Primary Leadership Academy is located in Hendford Drive and takes pupils in the age range 3–11. The school was established in 1873, and Barkerend Primary School was renamed Barkerend Academy in 2016 when it was taken over by Wakefield City Academies Trust. The school is now sponsored by Star Academies.

A newer building has been added to accommodate growing pupil numbers while the original building is grade II listed. To the east is Byron Primary School in new premises on Barkerend Road. The original Byron Primary premises are occupied by Olive Secondary School.

To the north of the Pollard Park area is Carlton Bolling, an 11–16 co-educational secondary school.

== Sport ==
To the east of Barkerend is the landscaped Myra Shay sports ground opened in 2006, a development by Regen 2000. Myra Shay has three football pitches, two five-a-side football pitches, a cricket pitch, kabaddi court, changing facilities and a play area. Myra Shay takes its name from a manor house that used to occupy the area.

== See also ==
- Listed buildings in Bradford (Bowling and Barkerend Ward)
