= Appleton Academy =

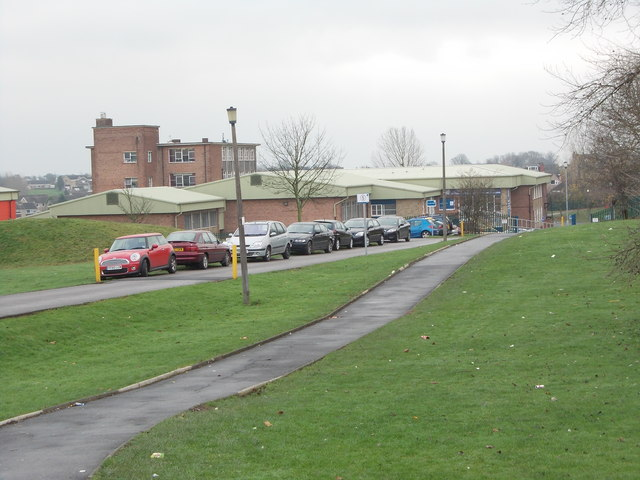
- View of Wyke Manor (2011) Shutdown

Location
- Woodside Road; Wyke; City of Bradford, West Yorkshire, BD12 8AL; England; 53.74256°N 1.77123°W

Information
- Type: Academy
- Local authority: Bradford
- Trust: Exceed Academies Trust
- Department for Education URN: 145173 Tables
- Ofsted: Reports
- Executive Headteacher: Helen Jones
- Gender: Mixed
- Age: 3 to 16
- Website: http://www.appletonacademy.co.uk/

Appleton Academy is a mixed all-through school for pupils aged 3 to 16. It is located in Wyke in the City of Bradford, in the English county of West Yorkshire. The school is named after Sir Edward Victor Appleton, a physicist who won the Nobel Prize in Physics in 1947.

The school was formed in 2009 from the merger of Wyke Manor School (secondary school) and High Fernley Primary School. The school moved into new buildings in 2012. It is an academy that is sponsored by the Exceed Academies Trust.

Appleton Academy offers GCSEs and BTECs as programmes of study for pupils.
