= Beckfoot Thornton =

Academy in Bradford, West Yorkshire, England

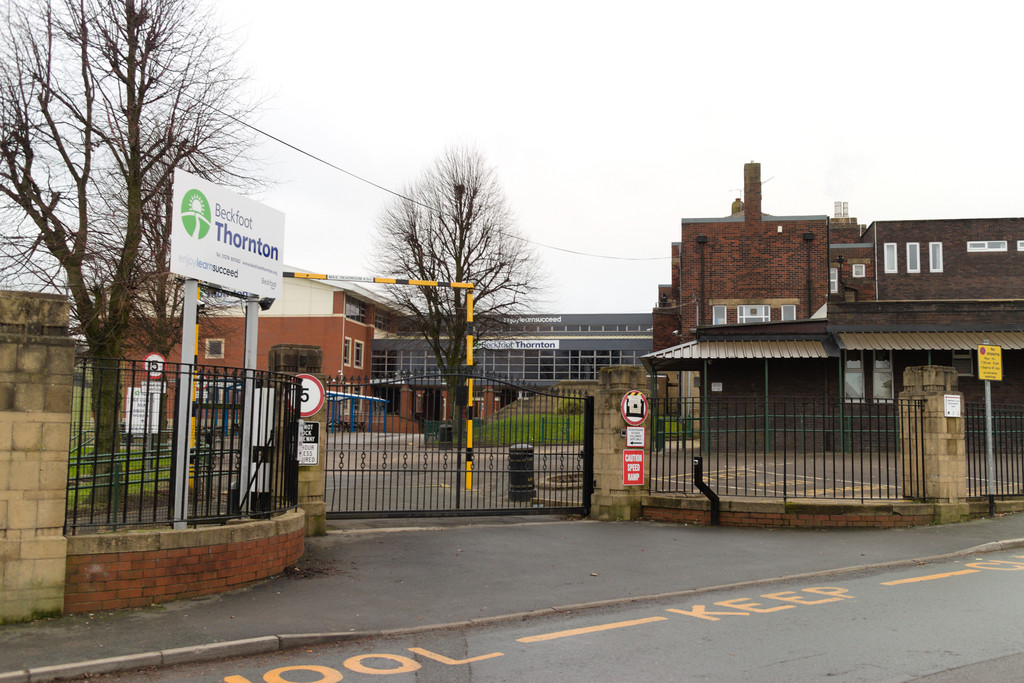
- Main gate-(2022)

Location
- Leaventhorpe Lane; Thornton; Bradford, West Yorkshire, BD13 3BH; England; 53.7913°N 1.8217°W

Information
- Type: Academy
- Motto: Enjoy Learn Succeed
- Established: 2016
- School district: Thornton and Allerton
- Local authority: Bradford
- Trust: Beckfoot Trust
- Department for Education URN: 143114 Tables
- Ofsted: Reports
- Headteacher: Richard Hanson
- Gender: Mixed
- Age: 11 to 16
- Enrolment: 1, 243 as of July 2026
- Website: http://www.beckfootthornton.org/

Beckfoot Thornton (Thornton Grammar School until 2016) is a mixed secondary school located in Thornton, West Yorkshire, England.

It is an Academy administered by Beckfoot Trust since 2016 and formerly a comprehensive foundation school administered by Bradford City Council and the Thornton Grammar and Queensbury School Learning Trust. It offers GCSEs and Vocational Courses as programmes of study for pupils. The school previously had a sixth form but now caters for pupils aged 11 to 16.

== Notable former pupils ==
- Amjad Bashir, politician
- Eric Bedford, (1909–2001), architect
- John Edward Fletcher, scholar
- Robin Fox, anthropologist
- Jack Kitching, rugby league player
- Leon Pryce, rugby league player
- Matt Clifford, entrepreneur
- Billie Whitelaw, actor
