= Beckfoot Upper Heaton =

School in Bradford, West Yorkshire, England

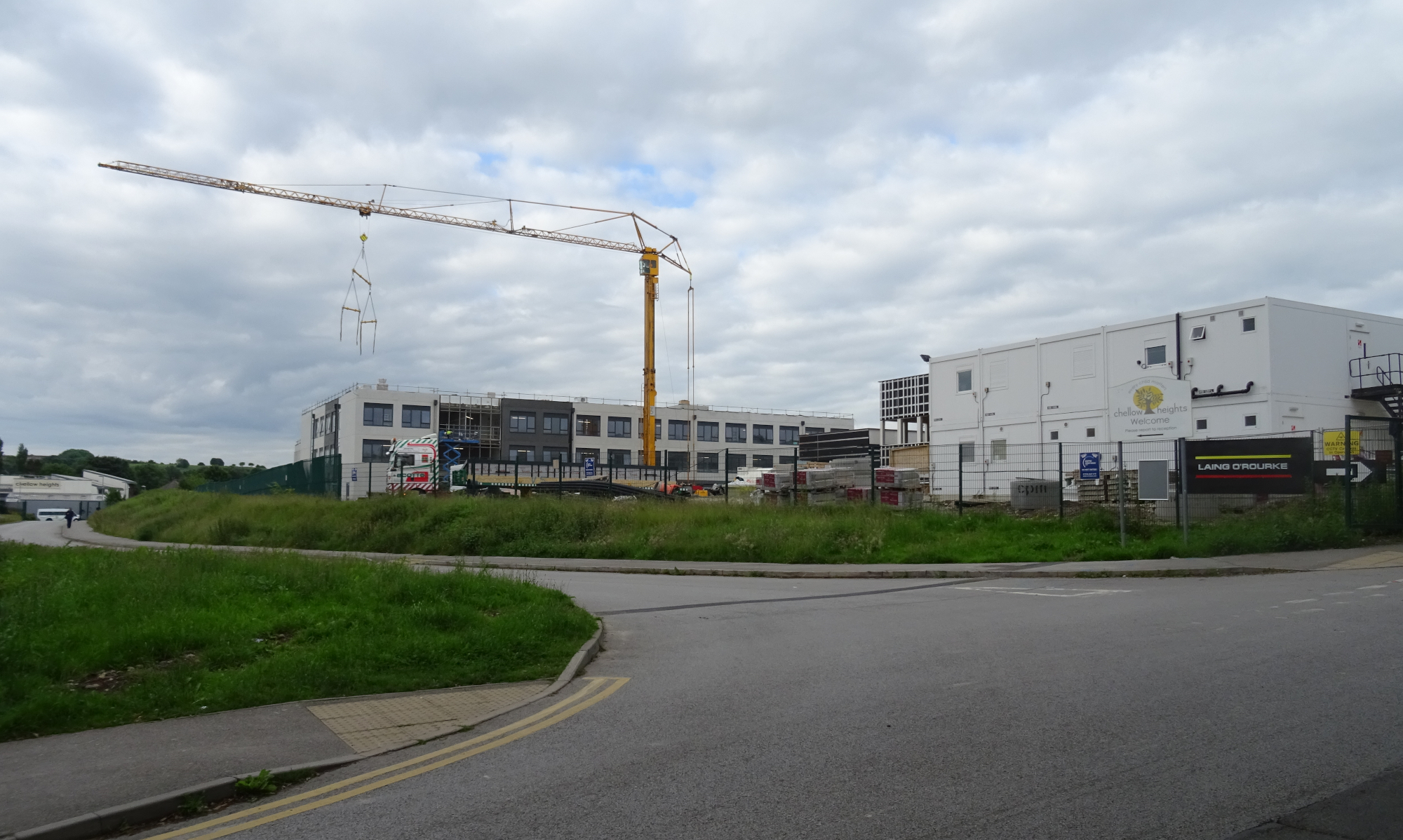
- The new school buildings under construction (2016)

Location
- Thorn Lane; Bingley Road; Bradford, West Yorkshire, BD9 6ND; England; 53.819°N 1.812°W

Information
- Type: Academy
- Established: 1877
- Local authority: City of Bradford
- Trust: Beckfoot Trust
- Department for Education URN: 142031 Tables
- Ofsted: Reports
- Head teacher: Biman Dey
- Gender: Co-educational
- Age: 11 to 16
- Website: http://www.beckfootupperheaton.org/

Beckfoot Upper Heaton (formerly Belle Vue Boys' School) is a co-educational secondary school in Bradford, West Yorkshire, England. It is situated near the Hallmark Cards factory, not far from Bingley Road (B6269).

Previously a boys' school, Beckfoot Upper Heaton introduced girls starting in Year 7 in September 2016 and moved to new buildings in 2017.

== History ==
The school was founded in 1877 and was officially opened (including the girls' section) on 12 August 1879 by William Edward Forster, the local MP. It moved to the present site in 1964, as a boys secondary grammar school. It was known as Belle Vue High School from 1896. In 1918, the junior and infants section closed, with the buildings being taken over. From 1966 it became a comprehensive. It had four houses – Dunwell, Hirst, Holroyd and Parry.

Previously a community school administered by Bradford City Council, Belle Vue Boys' School converted to academy status in September 2015 and was renamed Beckfoot Upper Heaton. The school is now sponsored by the Beckfoot Trust, but continues to coordinate with Bradford City Council for admissions.

== Notable former pupils ==
=== Belle Vue Boys' School ===
- Adil Rashid – Yorkshire and England cricket player
- Marsha Singh 1954– 2012 – Labour MP for Bradford West (includes the school) 1997 to 2012

=== Belle Vue Boys' Grammar School ===
- Paul Bayes, Bishop of Liverpool
- Mike Batt, Composer and music producer
- Kamlesh Patel, Baron Patel of Bradford – politician and member of the House of Lords.
- David Butterfield, Archdeacon of the East Riding from 2007 to 2014
- James Hill (British director), film director of 1966 Born Free
- Philip Hobsbaum, poet and literary scholar
- Norman Crowther Hunt, Baron Crowther-Hunt of Eccleshill – former Labour education minister from 1974 to 1976, Rector from 1982 to 1987 of Exeter College, Oxford
- Sir Robert Yewdall Jennings – President from 1991 to 1994 of the International Court of Justice
- George Layton, actor – starred in Confessions of a Driving Instructor
- Maurice Peston, Baron Peston (briefly), economist at Queen Mary College, and father of Robert Peston
- J. B. Priestley, writer, who wrote Time and the Conways, and Freeman of the City of Bradford
- Simon Rouse – actor who played Jack Meadows in The Bill
- Jack Schofield – former computer editor, The Guardian
- Fred Watson – astronomer
- Fielding West – Labour MP from 1934 to 1935 for Hammersmith North and from 1929 to 1931 Kensington North

== See also ==
- Belle Vue Girls' Academy
