= Cutler Heights =

Suburb in Bradford, West Yorkshire, England

Coordinates: 53.779°N 1.719°W

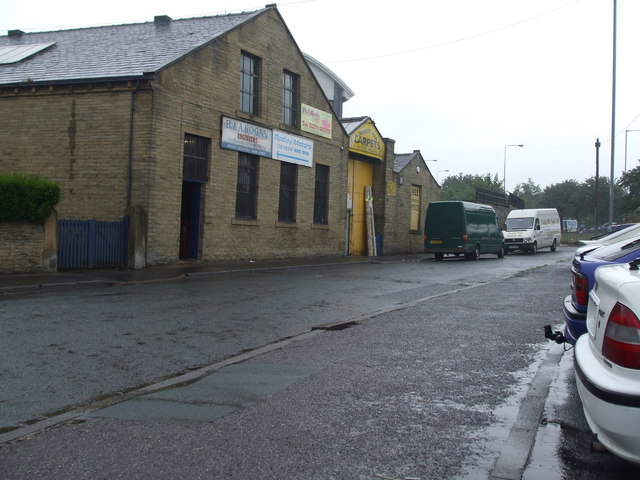
Industrial units along Cutler Heights Lane

Cutler Heights is a locality between Bowling and Laisterdyke in Bradford, West Yorkshire, England. It is known for its many industrial estates, among them engineering and steel trading businesses.
