= Bradford Academy, West Yorkshire =

Bradford Academy
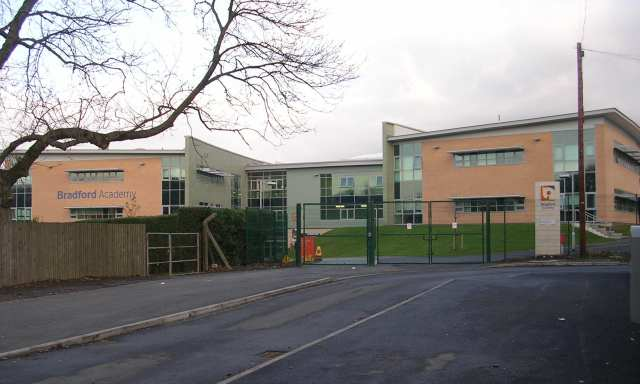
- The school seen from Bowling Hall Road

Location
- Lister Avenue; Bradford, West Yorkshire, BD4 7QS; England; 53°46′34″N 1°43′56″W

Information
- Type: Academy, Primary School
- Religious affiliation: Anglican
- Established: 2007
- Local authority: City of Bradford
- Department for Education URN: 135367 Tables
- Ofsted: Reports
- Executive Principal: Mel Saville
- Secondary Principal: Chris Rowbottom
- Gender: Mixed
- Age: 2 to 18
- Enrolment: 1500<n<2000
- Website: http://www.bradfordacademy.co.uk

Bradford Academy is a Diocese of West Yorkshire, sponsored all-through Academy in south-east Bradford. It has grown to approximately 2,000 pupils.

Bradford Academy opened in September 2007. In September 2010, Bradford Academy secured All-Through Academy status, with a 62-place nursery, primary provision for reception to Year 6 and over 500 students in Post 16. Bradford Academy has pupils ranging from ages 2 to 19.

Bradford Academy is sponsored by the Diocese of Bradford and together have developed Citizenship with Enterprise as the specialism of the Academy. Bradford Academy's ambition is for at least 60% of their students to gain five good GCSEs, ensuring they are in the top 5% of similar schools nationally.

== History ==
The school cost approximately £25 million to build. Accounting for inflation, that is just over £62 million. It opened to its first pupils on 9 September 2007. It was officially opened in April 2008 by John Sentamu, the Archbishop of York. The school is based on the site of Bradford Cathedral Community College which was a voluntary-aided school on Lister Avenue for ages 11–18. This was on the site of Fairfax Grammar School, opened in 1963 on Lister Avenue which became Fairfax School then Fairfax Community School, which closed in 2007. In the early 1970s it had around 1,100 boys and girls aged 13–18.
