= Bierley, West Yorkshire =

Area of Bradford, West Yorkshire, England

Coordinates: 53.767°N 1.731°W

Bierley
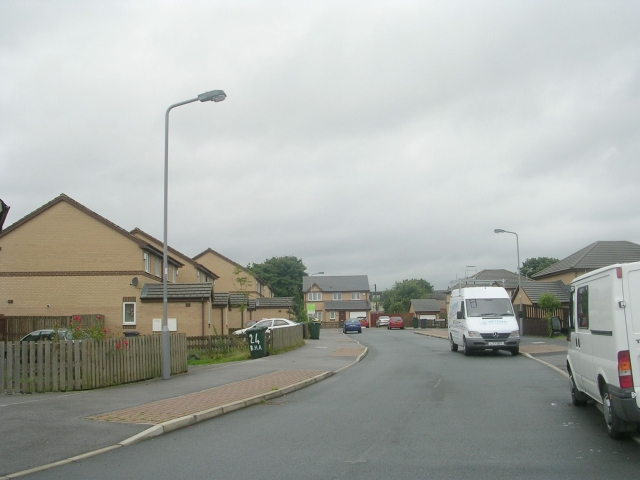
- A street in Bierley

- Location within West Yorkshire
- OS grid reference: SE1730
- Metropolitan borough: City of Bradford
- Metropolitan county: West Yorkshire
- Region: Yorkshire and the Humber
- Country: England
- Sovereign state: United Kingdom
- Post town: BRADFORD
- Postcode district: BD4
- Dialling code: 01274
- Police: West Yorkshire
- Fire: West Yorkshire
- Ambulance: Yorkshire

Bierley is an area in the Tong ward of the City of Bradford, West Yorkshire, England. Until 1974 it was in the West Riding of Yorkshire.

== Geography ==
Bierley housing estate is situated about 2.3 miles (3.7 km) south-east of the centre of Bradford, south of the A650 road and the A6036 road. Neighbouring places are in clockwise order: Oakenshaw in the south, Low Moor, Odsal, Bankfoot, West Bowling, East Bowling, Dudley Hill, Holme Wood, Westgate Hill and Tong Village in the City of Bradford and East Bierley in Kirklees in the south-east.

== History ==
In 1872 Bierley was recorded as a township in the parish of Bradford that included the village of Wibsey, the hamlets of Bierley Lane, Carr Lane, Hilltop, Odsal Moor, Woodhouse Hill and Folly Hall, and the districts of Low Moor (where the Leeds, Bradford and Halifax Junction Railway had a station) and Slack. Its population was about 9,500 persons in 1841 and 12,500 in 1861. The township was also known as North Bierley, to distinguish it from similarly named places. This is remembered in the name of North Bierley cemetery, opened in 1902 and situated between Low Moor and Buttershaw. In 1866 North Bierley became a separate civil parish, from 1894 to 1899 North Bierley was an urban district, the district contaiend the parishes of North Bierley and Wyke. In 1951 the parish had a population of 26,739.

The former township has been split up following administrative reorganisation. The modern housing estate of Bierley, Bierley Hall Wood, and the hamlets of Bierley Lane and Hilltop now belong to Tong ward. Low Moor and Carr Lane are part of Wyke ward, while Wibsey, Slack and Folly Hall are in Wibsey ward.

== Notable buildings ==
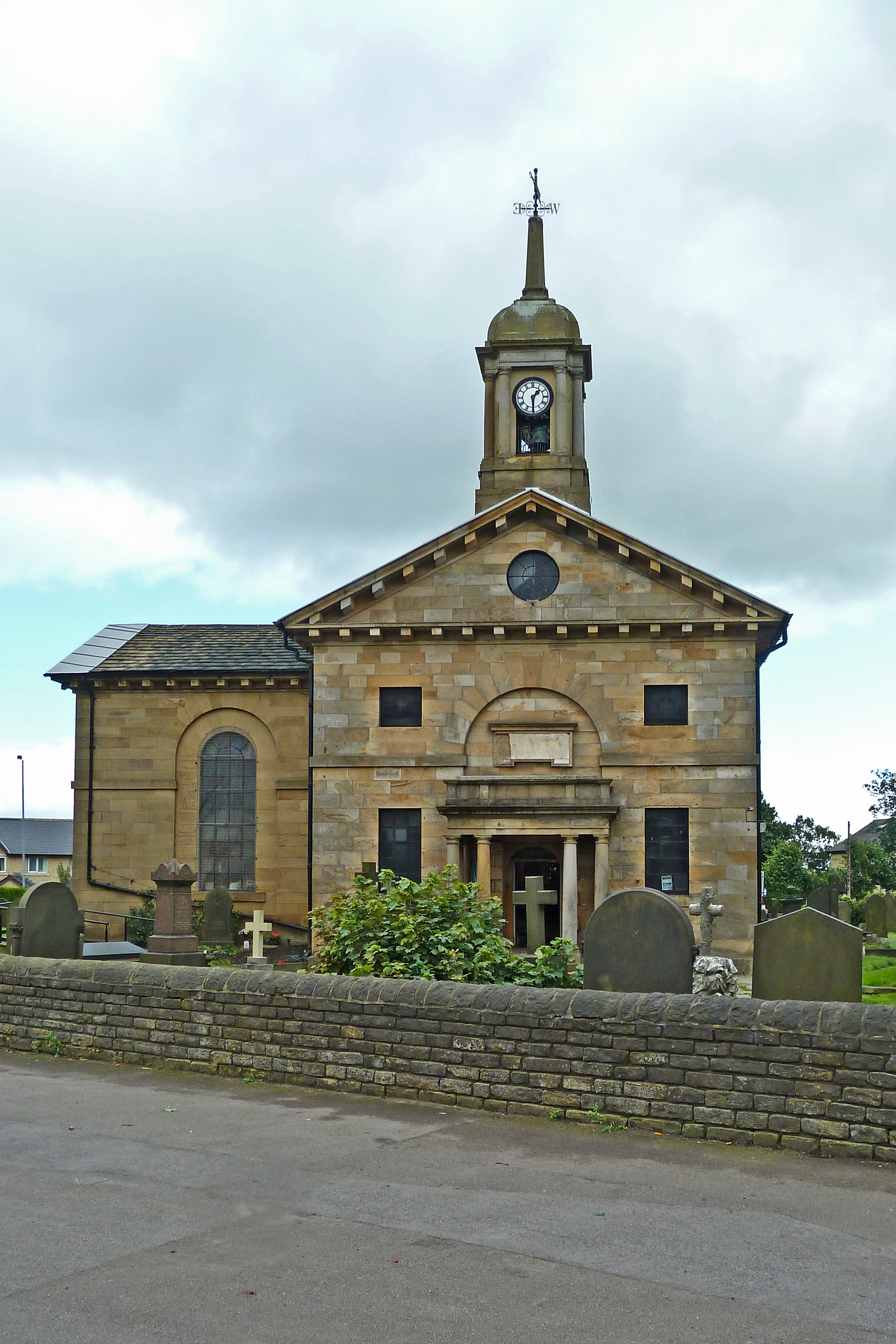
St John the Evangelist church

- St John the Evangelist, Bierley, dating from 1766, now a Grade II* listed building.

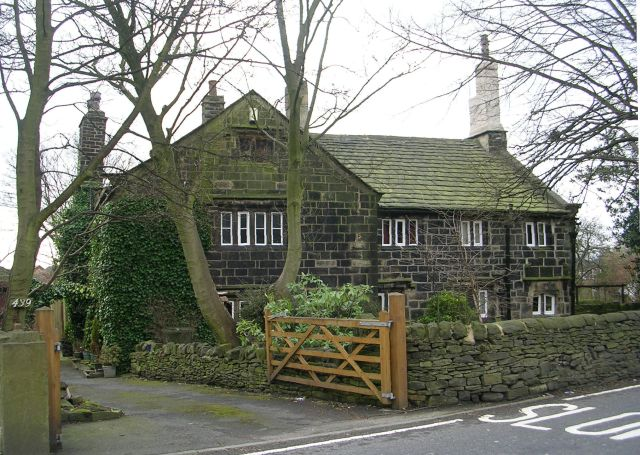
Historic houses in Shetcliffe Lane

- A set of two-storey yeoman's houses in Shetcliffe Lane dates back to the 15th or 16th century. The originally timber-framed buildings were encased in gritstone masonry in 1625 and have also been declared Grade II* listed buildings.

== Notable people ==
- Charles Sutton (1906–1945), cricketer

== See also ==
- Listed buildings in Bradford (Tong Ward)
