= 1979 City of Bradford Metropolitan District Council election =

1979 UK local government election

Elections to City of Bradford Metropolitan District Council were held on the same day as the general election, with one third of the council up for election as well as double vacancies in Haworth, Oakworth & Oxenhope and Heaton. The University incumbent had defected from Labour to Independent Labour the year before. The election resulted in the Conservatives retaining control with voter turnout at 72.7%.

== Election result ==
Bradford local election result 1979
Party	Seats	Gains	Losses	Net gain/loss	Seats %	Votes %	Votes	+/−
Labour	16	10	0	+10	48.5	46.1	113,102	+7.4
Conservative	15	0	9	-9	45.4	44.5	109,242	-4.7
Liberal	2	0	0	0	6.1	9.3	22,706	+0.5
Independent	0	0	0	0	0.0	0.1	265	-0.5

This result had the following consequences for the total number of seats on the council after the elections:

Party	Previous council	New council
Conservatives	60	51
Labour	28	38
Liberals	4	4
Independent Labour	1	0
Total	93	93
Working majority	27	9

== Ward results ==
Allerton
Party	Candidate	Votes	%	±%
Conservative	A. Pollard	4,716	48.4	−10.0
Labour	R. Hallam	3,913	40.1	+8.3
Liberal	K. Buckley	1,121	11.5	+4.0
Majority		803	8.2	−18.3
Turnout		9,750	72.3	+36.2
Conservative hold		Swing	-9.1	

Baildon
Party	Candidate	Votes	%	±%
Liberal	F. Atkinson	4,516	46.5	+27.0
Conservative	W. Nunn	3,168	32.6	−23.3
Labour	P. Clarke	2,029	20.9	−3.8
Majority		1,348	13.9	−17.3
Turnout		9,713	81.9	+35.2
Liberal hold		Swing	+25.1	

Bingley: Central, East, North & West
Party	Candidate	Votes	%	±%
Conservative	T. Shaw	5,074	52.0	−10.2
Labour	W. Welsh	2,870	29.4	+3.4
Liberal	W. Tregonig	1,812	18.6	+6.7
Majority		2,204	22.6	−13.6
Turnout		9,756	78.8	+37.0
Conservative hold		Swing	-6.8	

Bolton
Party	Candidate	Votes	%	±%
Labour	R. Baxter	3,999	51.2	+13.4
Conservative	T. Hall	3,815	48.8	+1.1
Majority		184	2.3	−7.7
Turnout		7,814	70.6	+36.1
Labour gain from Conservative		Swing	+6.1	

Bowling
Party	Candidate	Votes	%	±%
Labour	D. Coughlin	3,420	65.3	+5.2
Conservative	R. Swanson	1,816	34.7	−0.8
Majority		1,604	30.6	+6.1
Turnout		5,236	67.3	+33.8
Labour hold		Swing	+3.0	

Bradford Moor
Party	Candidate	Votes	%	±%
Labour	J. Sheals	5,142	65.5	+15.4
Conservative	J. Rees	2,750	34.8	−1.4
Majority		2,392	30.3	+16.8
Turnout		7,892	70.9	+28.4
Labour gain from Conservative		Swing	+8.4	

Clayton, Ambler Thorn & Queensbury
Party	Candidate	Votes	%	±%
Conservative	J. Hurst	6,712	52.9	−8.9
Labour	G. Mitchell	5,970	47.1	+11.7
Majority		742	5.8	−20.6
Turnout		12,682	74.8	+39.7
Conservative hold		Swing	-10.3	

Craven: Silsden, Addingham, Kildwick & Steeton with Eastburn
Party	Candidate	Votes	%	±%
Conservative	K. Hawkins	5,013	62.2	+3.1
Labour	J. Lawrence	3,040	37.7	−1.0
Majority		1,973	24.5	+4.2
Turnout		8,053	80.9	+40.2
Conservative hold		Swing	+2.0	

Denholme, Cullingworth, Bingley South & Wilsden
Party	Candidate	Votes	%	±%
Conservative	D. Conquest	5,051	60.2	−13.9
Labour	K. Carey	2,115	25.2	+6.7
Liberal	S. Clemence	1,229	14.6	+7.2
Majority		2,936	35.0	−20.6
Turnout		8,395	79.2	+36.8
Conservative hold		Swing	-10.3	

Eccleshill
Party	Candidate	Votes	%	±%
Labour	P. Lancaster	4,153	54.3	+11.2
Conservative	L. Riggs	3,493	45.7	+0.2
Majority		660	8.6	+6.2
Turnout		7,646	70.6	+32.9
Labour gain from Conservative		Swing	+5.5	

Great Horton
Party	Candidate	Votes	%	±%
Conservative	J. Rawnsley	4,244	51.2	+1.6
Labour	A. Corina	4,047	48.8	+1.5
Majority		197	2.4	+0.1
Turnout		8,291	75.6	+34.4
Conservative hold		Swing	+0.0	

Haworth, Oakworth & Oxenhope
Party	Candidate	Votes	%	±%
Conservative	S. Midgley	3,959	46.1	−10.7
Conservative	L. Pickles	3,236		
Labour Co-op	H. Binns	2,980	34.7	+0.7
Labour	F. Hutchinson	2,723		
Liberal	B. Kershaw	1,652	19.2	+10.0
Liberal	H. Mortimer	1,441		
Majority		256	11.4	−11.3
Turnout		7,995	67.8	+30.2
Conservative hold		Swing		
Conservative hold		Swing	-5.7	

Heaton
Party	Candidate	Votes	%	±%
Conservative	D. Emmott	3,718	47.6	−9.7
Conservative	C. Hobson	3,513		
Labour	B. Lynch	2,931	37.5	+6.0
Labour	I. Qureshi	2,254		
Liberal	A. Brook	1,165	14.9	+6.8
Majority		582	10.1	−15.7
Turnout		7,814	66.5	+22.0
Conservative hold		Swing		
Conservative hold		Swing	-7.8	

Idle
Party	Candidate	Votes	%	±%
Liberal	A. Bagshaw	3,370	37.5	−56.1
Conservative	I. Marlowe	2,888	32.1	+32.1
Labour	K. Briggs	2,732	30.4	+30.4
Majority		482	5.4	−81.8
Turnout		8,990	75.6	+40.2
Liberal hold		Swing	-44.1	

Ilkley: Ben Rhydding, Ilkley North, South & West
Party	Candidate	Votes	%	±%
Conservative	J. Spencer	4,677	60.1	−11.1
Liberal	C. Svensgaard	1,813	23.3	−5.5
Labour	C. Haigh	1,292	16.6	+16.6
Majority		2,864	36.8	−5.6
Turnout		7,782	76.8	+36.5
Conservative hold		Swing	-2.8	

Ilkley: Burley, Holme & Menston
Party	Candidate	Votes	%	±%
Conservative	W. Clavering	3,585	56.1	−7.4
Liberal	D. Turner	1,765	27.6	+13.3
Labour	L. Fox	1,037	16.2	−5.9
Majority		1,820	28.5	−12.9
Turnout		6,387	80.0	+30.5
Conservative hold		Swing	-10.3	

Keighley: Keighley Central, East & South
Party	Candidate	Votes	%	±%
Labour	W. Clarkson	4,529	54.3	+1.5
Conservative	D. Robertshaw	2,672	32.0	−6.0
Liberal	J. Brooksbank	1,144	13.7	+6.9
Majority		1,857	22.2	+7.5
Turnout		8,345	75.7	+34.3
Labour hold		Swing	+3.7	

Keighley: Morton & Keighley North East
Party	Candidate	Votes	%	±%
Conservative	H. Milton	2,745	44.4	−5.6
Labour	J. Watson	2,162	35.0	+5.5
Liberal	G. Sims	1,275	20.6	+2.8
Majority		583	9.4	−11.1
Turnout		6,182	79.0	+38.9
Conservative hold		Swing	-5.5	

Keighley: North West & West
Party	Candidate	Votes	%	±%
Labour	S. Bowen	4,406	47.3	−1.8
Conservative	I. Cowen	3,666	39.3	−9.4
Liberal	W. Edge	1,244	13.3	+13.3
Majority		740	7.9	+7.6
Turnout		9,316	77.5	+34.8
Labour gain from Conservative		Swing	+3.8	

Laisterdyke
Party	Candidate	Votes	%	±%
Labour	T. Wood	3,595	70.3	+2.3
Conservative	H. Thorne	1,521	29.7	−2.3
Majority		2,074	40.5	+4.5
Turnout		5,116	65.0	+33.0
Labour hold		Swing	+2.3	

Little Horton
Party	Candidate	Votes	%	±%
Labour	K. Ryallis	4,736	68.4	+22.6
Conservative	K. Warrillow	1,583	22.9	−9.5
Liberal	N. Baggley	600	8.7	−2.3
Majority		3,153	45.6	+32.1
Turnout		6,919	61.4	+32.8
Labour hold		Swing	+16.0	

Manningham
Party	Candidate	Votes	%	±%
Labour	M. Ajeeb	4,037	62.1	+7.6
Conservative	S. Bali	2,200	33.8	+5.6
Independent	R. Shahid-Delvhi	265	4.1	−5.4
Majority		1,837	28.2	+2.0
Turnout		6,502	62.9	+26.6
Labour gain from Conservative		Swing	+1.0	

Odsal
Party	Candidate	Votes	%	±%
Labour	D. Bentley	4,177	53.0	+12.1
Conservative	C. Lang	3,696	46.9	−12.1
Majority		481	6.1	−11.9
Turnout		7,873	74.6	+39.0
Labour gain from Conservative		Swing	+12.1	

Shipley: Central, North & East
Party	Candidate	Votes	%	±%
Labour	B. Chadwick	5,273	64.4	+5.0
Conservative	R. Wright	2,920	35.6	−5.0
Majority		2,353	28.7	+10.0
Turnout		8,193	75.2	+35.9
Labour hold		Swing	+5.0	

Shipley: South & West
Party	Candidate	Votes	%	±%
Conservative	O. Messer	5,125	63.5	−8.0
Labour	F. Bastow	2,940	36.5	+8.0
Majority		2,185	27.1	−16.0
Turnout		8,065	77.7	+34.9
Conservative hold		Swing	-8.0	

Thornton
Party	Candidate	Votes	%	±%
Conservative	R. Smith	4,226	54.0	−8.5
Labour	R. Holroyde	3,606	46.0	+16.1
Majority		620	7.9	−24.6
Turnout		7,832	75.1	+37.3
Conservative hold		Swing	-12.3	

Tong
Party	Candidate	Votes	%	±%
Labour	D. Smith	5,445	69.9	+5.1
Conservative	J. Owen	2,343	30.1	−1.3
Majority		3,102	39.8	+6.4
Turnout		7,788	61.7	+34.1
Labour hold		Swing	+3.2	

Undercliffe
Party	Candidate	Votes	%	±%
Labour	R. Sowman	3,476	54.7	+1.1
Conservative	H. Ibbotson	2,880	45.3	+3.5
Majority		596	9.4	−2.4
Turnout		6,356	72.8	+31.0
Labour gain from Conservative		Swing	-1.2	

University
Party	Candidate	Votes	%	±%
Labour	G. Armitage	4,209	72.6	+13.7
Conservative	D. Bagley	1,588	27.4	+5.4
Majority		2,621	45.2	+8.2
Turnout		5,797	61.4	+20.1
Labour gain from Independent Labour		Swing	+4.1	

Wibsey
Party	Candidate	Votes	%	±%
Labour	L. Kearns	3,826	50.3	+13.6
Conservative	P. Gross	3,782	49.7	−10.4
Majority		44	0.6	−22.9
Turnout		7,608	71.1	+36.1
Labour gain from Conservative		Swing	+12.0	

Wyke
Party	Candidate	Votes	%	±%
Labour	D. Mangham	5,015	58.1	−4.3
Conservative	K. Porter	3,616	41.9	+4.3
Majority		1,399	16.2	−8.7
Turnout		8,631	71.2	+35.7
Labour gain from Conservative		Swing	-4.3	
