= Holme Beck =

River in West Yorkshire, England

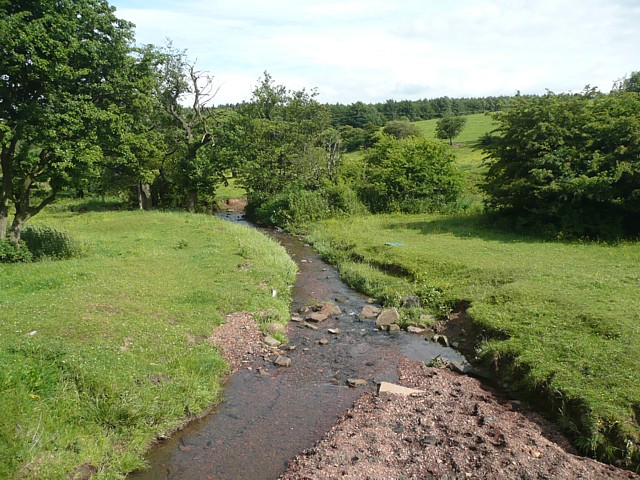
- Holme Beck near Scholebrook Lane, Tong
- Etymology: Holme, a settlement east of Bradford; Beck (stream)

Location
- Country: United Kingdom
- Constituent country: England
- Region: Yorkshire and the Humber
- Ceremonial county: West Yorkshire
- Metropolitan Borough: City of Bradford

Physical characteristics
- Source: east of Ned Lane
  - location: east of Holme Wood
  - coordinates: 53°46′39″N 1°42′00″W
- Mouth: junction with Tyersal Beck forming Pudsey Beck
  - location: near Fulneck
  - coordinates: 53°46′46″N 1°40′6″W

Basin features
- Tributaries
  - left: unnamed stream
  - right: Kit Wood Beck; Peter's Shrog

Holme Beck is a watercourse in the Tong ward of the City of Bradford, West Yorkshire, England. It drains a shallow valley east of the watershed between Bradford and Leeds.

== Course ==
The source of Holme Beck was originally located at a height of just above 600 feet (183 m) a.s.l. on the grounds of today's Knowleswood Primary School in Holme Wood. The stream passed the area of the Valley Natural Play Park and crossed Ned Lane. Little is visible now of its upper course, as it has been covered up.

Holme Beck becomes visible east of Ned Lane and follows an approximately eastern course until it is joined by a tributary stream from the north. Passing Charles Pit, a former coal mine which was in operation from 1884 to 1925, it turns slightly towards east-southeast, passes some old mine workings on its right bank and passes under the bridge of Scholebrook Lane. Below the bridge and upon entering Park Wood, it is joined from the southwest by Kit Wood Beck which is named after a woodland on its course and whose source is north of Tong High School.

Holme Beck turns east-northeast just south of Scholebrook Farm and is joined from the south by Peter's Shrog, a stream coming from a source east of Tong High School. From this junction it continues through Park Wood until its confluence with Tyersal Beck at the edge of Fulneck Golf Course at just below 600 feet (183 m) a.s.l. The joint stream continues as Pudsey Beck.
