= Tyersal Beck =

Stream in West Yorkshire, England

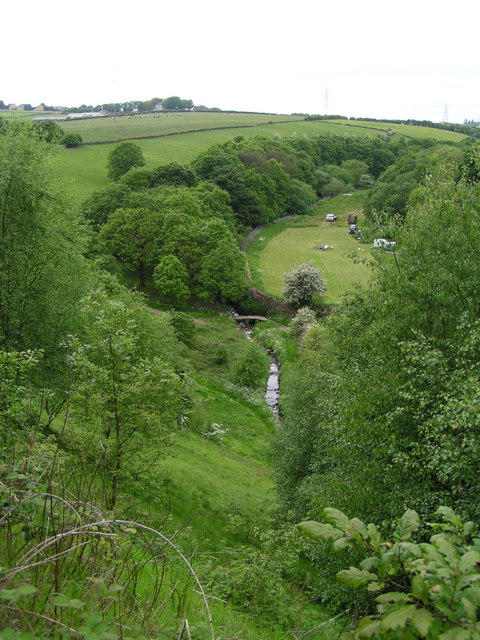
- Tyersal Beck seen from the embankment of the former Pudsey loop line railway
- Etymology: Tyersal; Beck (stream)

Location
- Country: United Kingdom
- Constituent country: England
- Region: Yorkshire and the Humber
- Ceremonial county: West Yorkshire
- Metropolitan Borough: City of Leeds

Physical characteristics
- Source: Phoenix Park Golf Course
  - location: east of Thornbury
  - coordinates: 53°47′52″N 1°42′03″W
- Mouth: junction with Holme Beck forming Pudsey Beck
  - location: near Fulneck
  - coordinates: 53°46′46″N 1°40′6″W

Basin features
- Tributaries
  - right: stream from Black Hey Farm; Carr Beck unnamed stream stream from Scholebrook Lane

Tyersal Beck is a watercourse in West Yorkshire, England, named after the village of Tyersal in whose vicinity it runs.

== Course ==
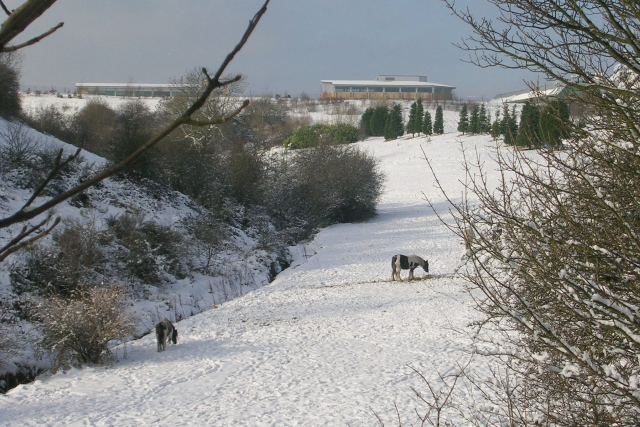
Phoenix Park Golf Course with Tyersal Beck

Its source is located near the Odeon cinema at the eastern edge of Thornbury. The stream crosses the grounds of Phoenix Park Golf Course between Farsley and Thornbury. A longer source arm which originates near 53°47′42″N 1°42′45″W runs along the southern edge of the golf course, immediately north of the railway between Bradford and Leeds. The two arms join immediately west of Daleside Road near 53°47′48″N 1°41′48″W. The stream runs initially in a roughly eastern direction. Daleside Road crosses over it as well as the railway line. Then Tyersal Beck turns nearly south, skirting the edge of Upper Moor, and runs along the valley between Tyersal and the western edge of Pudsey town, where it passes through the embankment of the former Pudsey loop line railway in a culvert. This embankment, built in the late 19th century, was claimed to have been the largest man made embankment in Europe at that time. After joining with Carr Beck, it describes a wide arc and, while meandering at the bottom of a wide valley, turns east towards the southern edge of Fulneck Golf Course where it is joined by Holme Beck. The joint stream continues as Pudsey Beck.

== Ecology ==
The water in Tyersal Beck is usually very clear. However, illegal pollution of the watercourse has been reported on several occasions.
