= Listed buildings in Pudsey =

Pudsey is a ward in the metropolitan borough of the City of Leeds, West Yorkshire, England. It contains 47 listed buildings that are recorded in the National Heritage List for England. Of these, one is listed at Grade I, the highest of the three grades, two are at Grade II*, the middle grade, and the others are at Grade II, the lowest grade. The parish contains the town of Pudsey, including the area of Swinnow, and the countryside to the southwest, including the village of Tyersal. It also contains the Fulneck Moravian Settlement, many of whose buildings are listed. Most of the other listed buildings are houses, cottages, and associated structures, farmhouses and farm buildings, a milestone, public houses, some of which have been converted for other uses, former schools, churches, a bank, and a war memorial.

== Key ==
Grade	Criteria
I	Buildings of exceptional interest, sometimes considered to be internationally important
II*	Particularly important buildings of more than special interest
II	Buildings of national importance and special interest

== Buildings ==
Name and location	Photograph	Date	Notes	Grade
Tyersal Hall; 53.78596°N 1.69728°W		Late medieval	A large timber framed house that was extended in the late 16th century, and encased in stone in 1691. It has quoins, and a stone slate roof with coped gables, kneelers and finials. There are two storeys, a double-depth plan, a main range, and two rear gabled wings with a single-storey aisle between them. The gabled porch has a Tudor arched doorway with a chamfered surround and an initialled and dated lintel, and the inner doorway has a Tudor arched lintel, composite jambs, and a moulded surround. The windows are double-chamfered and mullioned.	II*
Cottage and barn, Greentop; 53.78893°N 1.67188°W	—	17th century	The barn is older than the cottage, it was timber framed, and was encased in stone in the 18th century. The buildings are in stone with a stone slate roof. The cottage has two storeys, a coped gable on the left, and quoins. Its doorway has composite jambs and a moulded surround, and the windows are mullioned. The barn has three bays and an aisle, and it contains a full-height cart entry.	II
Tudor House; 53.79291°N 1.66808°W		Mid 17th century	A stone house with quoins, and a stone slate roof with a coped gable on the left. There are two storeys, two bays, and a rear outshut. The doorway has a chamfered surround, a Tudor arch, and a hood mould. The windows are mullioned, those in the ground floor with hood moulds.	II
3 Booth's Yard; 53.79719°N 1.66196°W		Late 17th century	A cottage, with a house added to the rear in the 18th century, later two shops. They are in sandstone with two storeys, the cottage has a stone slate roof, and the house a roof of Welsh blue slate, and the windows are mullioned with some mullions missing. The cottage has one bay, a doorway with composite jambs and a Tudor arched lintel with a chamfered surround forming spandrels. The house has two bays, and a central doorway with monolithic jambs.	II
4 Booth's Yard; 53.79733°N 1.66201°W	—	Late 17th century (possible)	A cottage, later a shop, it is in sandstone, with quoins and a stone slate roof. There is a single storey and two bays. The two doorways have tie-stone jambs, and the windows are mullioned, one with a slate hood mould.	II
5 Booth's Yard; 53.79723°N 1.66210°W		Late 17th century	A house and a cottage later converted and used as a wine bar. The building is in sandstone, with the surrounds of the openings in gritstone. The house has two storeys and two bays, and the cottage has one bay. In the house is a central doorway with tie-stone jambs and a Tudor arched lintel with chamfered surrounds forming spandrels, and most of the windows are mullioned. The cottage has quoins, and a doorway with a monolithic jamb and a tie-stone jamb.	II
Cottage at rear of 5 Low Town; 53.79692°N 1.66158°W		Late 17th century	A stone house with quoins and a stone slate roof. There are two storeys, and the house contains a Tudor arched doorway with a moulded surround and spandrels. The windows are mullioned.	II
Troydale Farmhouse and barn 53.79008°N 1.64744°W	—	1706	The house and barn are in stone with quoins and stone slate roofs. The house has two storeys, three bays, and a single-storey outshut at the rear. The central doorway has composite jambs and a Tudor arched lintel with an inscription and date, and a chamfered surround forming spandrels, and the windows are mullioned. The barn on the left has three bays and an aisle, and contains a segmental-arched cart entry with voussoirs and a keystone. Elsewhere are doorways with tie-stone jambs and a pitching hole with a dovecote.	II
42 and 44 Greenside; 53.79067°N 1.67109°W		1714	A house, later divided, incorporating earlier timber framing, it is in stone, with quoins on the right, and a stone slate roof. The house is in two cells, the left cell lower, with two storeys and a single storey outshut at the rear of the left cell. In each cell is a doorway with monolithic jambs, and mullioned windows. The doorway in the right cell has an initialled and dated lintel with a moulded surround.	II
Barn east of Tyersal Hall; 53.78601°N 1.69653°W	—	Early 18th century (probable)	The barn, at right angles to the road, is in stone with quoins and a stone slate roof. There are five bays and a single aisle. On the front is a porch flanked by windows.	II
Barn northeast of Tyersal Hall; 53.78621°N 1.69671°W	—	Early 18th century (probable)	The barn, parallel with the road, is in stone with quoins and a stone slate roof. There are five bays and a single aisle. In the front is a cart entry, and on the rear is a porch with a doorway.	II
39 Fulneck; 53.78413°N 1.66445°W		c. 1745	A meeting room and minister's house, later a private house, it is in stone, with quoin pilasters in the ground floor, quoins above, gutter brackets, and a stone slate roof. There are two storeys and a symmetrical front of five bays. The central doorway has monolithic jambs, and above it is a semicircular-arched stair window with impost blocks and a keystone. The other bays contain four-light sash windows with plain surrounds.	II
Fulneck Moravian Chapel and attached ranges 53.78390°N 1.66446°W		1746–48	The buildings, which were extended in the following years, are in stone and red-brown brick, with roofs of stone slate and Welsh blue slate. They form a long range, and mainly have three storeys and attics. In the centre is the chapel with nine bays, flanked by schools, each with ten bays, and then the Brethrens' and Sisters' Houses, in brick with symmetrical fronts of seven bays. The chapel is surmounted by a cupola with a clock and weathervane, and the Brethrens' and Sisters' Houses contain Venetian windows.	I
Guide post 53.78611°N 1.65656°W		Mid 18th century	The milestone is in Roker Lane, and is in gritstone and roughly squared. It is inscribed with "Miles", and originally showed the distances to Wakefield and Morley.	II
Nesbit Hall; 53.78466°N 1.67535°W		1761	A large house in stone and some brick, with quoins, bands, and a stone slate roof. There are two storeys and a semi-basement, and a U-shaped plan consisting of a hall and gabled cross-wings. The symmetrical front has seven bays. The hall range has three bays, and a central doorway approached by steps, that has an architrave, a frieze decorated with swags, consoles, and a cornice. The windows are casements with plain surrounds. The wings have two bays each, and are framed by Tuscan quoin pilasters. The gables are pedimented, with ball finials, and in the tympani are blind oculi. At the rear is a tall arched stair windows, and in the right return of four bays is a doorway with monolithic jambs.	II*
Fulneck Shop; 53.78375°N 1.66690°W		c. 1762	A shop with living accommodation at the rear, it is in stone, rendered at the front, with quoins, and a roof with coped gables at the rear. There are two storeys at the rear, and one at the front, which has a shop front. This has a shaped gable, and contains a large shop window, and a doorway to the right with a lunette above it. Over this are two oculi with keystones, and between them is a wooden signboard. In the left return is a segmental-arched cart entry with a sash window above.	II
31 and 33 Fulneck; 53.78418°N 1.66393°W		Mid to late 18th century	A pair of stone houses with quoins, gutter brackets, and a stone slate roof. There are two storeys and each house has three bays. In the centre of each house is a doorway with monolithic jambs, above which is a single-light window, and in the outer bays are two-light mullioned windows; all the windows are sashes.	II
37 Fulneck; 53.78414°N 1.66439°W		Mid to late 18th century	A stone house with gutter brackets, a stone slate roof, two storeys and two bays. There are two doorways with monolithic jambs, and the windows are sashes, one in the upper floor with two lights and a mullion.	II
47–57 Fulneck; 53.78407°N 1.66542°W		Mid to late 18th century	A row of six differing stone cottages with stone slate roofs. No. 57 is taller, with two storeys, a doorway with monolithic jambs, two-light mullioned windows, and its gable end in brick. No. 55 is a museum with one storey, steps with cast iron railings leading up to a central doorway, and three-light mullioned windows. The other cottages have two storeys, No. 53 has a doorway with monolithic jambs and mullioned windows, and Nos. 47–51 are rendered and contain sash windows.	II
1 Chapeltown; 53.79295°N 1.66790°W		Late 18th century	The house is in stone and has a stone slate roof with coped gables. There are two storeys, a double-depth plan, and two bays. The central doorway has monolithic jambs, and the windows are mullioned with three or four lights.	II
13 Fartown; 53.78882°N 1.67031°W	—	Late 18th century	A stone house with quoins, sill bands, shaped gutter brackets, and a stone slate roof with a coped gable and shaped kneelers on the right. There are two storeys, two bays, and a rear lean-to. The doorway and windows have plain surrounds, and the windows are sashes, most with mullions.	II
19–27 Fulneck; 53.78442°N 1.66173°W		Late 18th century	A row of five cottages in stone with quoins and stone slate roofs. There are two storeys and each cottage has one bay. Nos. 19 and 20 were built later and are higher. Each cottage has a doorway with monolithic jambs, and two-light mullioned windows, and there is one blocked window.	II
60 Fulneck; 53.78377°N 1.66742°W		Late 18th century (probable)	A stone house, the south front rendered, on a plinth, with rusticated quoins, bands, gutter brackets, and a stone slate roof with coped gables and kneelers. It is built back-to earth, with three storeys at the front and one at the rear. The front has three symmetrical bays, a central doorway with composite jambs and three-light fanlight. The windows in the lower two floors are sashes, and in the top floor they are casements.	II
Britannia Public House and stables 53.79886°N 1.65262°W		Late 18th century	The public house and adjoining stables are in stone. The public house has a slate roof with coped gables and kneelers, two storeys, and three bays. On the front is a 20th-century porch, and the windows are casements with architraves and mullions. At the rear are sash windows and a round-headed stair window. The stables have a stone slate roof, and contain blocked stable doorways with tie-stone jambs, and paired windows with mullions.	II
Nelson House, steps and railings 53.78421°N 1.66369°W		Late 18th century	A house, later used for other purposes, it is in stone, on a plinth, with quoins, paired gutter brackets, and a stone slate roof with coped gables. There are two storeys and attics, and three bays. A double flight of steps with cast iron railings and a decorative wrought iron hoop lead up to a central doorway that has monolithic jambs. To the right is a canted bay window, and the other windows have single lights, or two lights with mullions, those in the middle floor with wrought iron window boxes. In the attic, the windows are blind.	II
Town End House; 53.79825°N 1.65318°W	—	Late 18th century	The house, that was later extended, is in gritstone, with quoins, moulded gutter brackets, and a stone slate roof. There are two storeys, an original range of two bays, an added bay on the left, and two on the right. Some windows are mullioned, and there is a square bay window.	II
83 and 85 Roker Lane; 53.78627°N 1.65372°W		c. 1800	A pair of back to back houses in stone, with a stone slate roof and coped gables. There are three storeys and two bays. The doorways have monolithic jambs, and the windows are sashes, some with mullions. At the rear, facing the road, is a small arched window, and in the right return external steps lead up to a doorway in the middle floor.	II
1 and 2 Tannery Yard; 53.79718°N 1.65954°W		c. 1800	A former industrial building and a cottage in stone, the cottage partly rendered, with quoins and a modern tile roof. The industrial building has three storeys, three bays, and an L-shaped plan with the gable end facing the street. The cottage has two storeys and two bays, and a doorway at the rear with monolithic jambs. The windows in both parts are mullioned.	II
1 and 2 Booth's Yard; 53.79712°N 1.66207°W		Late 18th or early 19th century	A pair of mirror-image cottages later used for other purposes, they are in sandstone with a stone slate roof. There are two storeys and two bays. In the centre are paired doorway with tie-stone jambs, the middle jamb shared, and the windows are mullioned with two lights.	II
20 and 22 Low Town; 53.79706°N 1.66201°W		Late 18th or early 19th century	A house, later two shops, in sandstone, with paired moulded gutter brackets, and a stone slate roof with a coped gable. There are two storeys and an attic, the gabled front facing the street, and two bays in the right return. The angle is chamfered and contains a doorway with monolithic jambs. On the front are two shop windows with fluted pilasters, consoles and cornices, the left with an integrated doorway. Above, are two two-light mullioned sash windows, and in the gable is a blocked arched window with impost blocks and a keystone. In the right return, the first bay contains a shop window, and in the second bay is a doorway converted into a window.	II
124 and 126 Roker Lane; 53.78438°N 1.64616°W		Late 18th or early 19th century (probable)	A house later divided, it is in stone with quoins, moulded gutter brackets, and a stone slate roof with coped gables. There are three storeys, an attic and cellars, and a symmetrical front of three bays. The central doorway has tie-stone jambs, above it is a semicircular-arched window, and the other windows are mullioned. At the rear is a doorway with monolithic jambs, and in the right return is a porch and a taking-in door converted into a window.	II
Black Hey Farmhouse; 53.78827°N 1.68822°W		Late 18th or early 19th century	A house and cottage combined into one dwelling, it is in stone with quoins, and stone slate roof with coped gables. There are two storeys and three bays. In each part is a doorway with monolithic jambs, and the windows are mullioned with three lights.	II
Height House; 53.78719°N 1.66971°W		Late 18th or early 19th century	The house, which was extended at the rear in the 19th century, is in stone, with quoins, gutter brackets, and a two-span stone slate roof with coped gables. There are two storeys, a main range of three bays, flanking lower and slightly recessed bays, and a later parallel rear range. On the front is a central doorway with a porch, the windows are sashes, and in the outer bays are Venetian windows.	II
Pudsey Town School; 53.79005°N 1.66042°W		c. 1811	A small school, later converted for other uses, it is in stone and has a stone slate roof with a coped gable on the left. There is a single storey and three bays. The doorway has tie-stone jambs and an inscribed lintel, and the windows are mullioned with two lights.	II
St Lawrence's Church; 53.79346°N 1.66694°W		1821–24	A Commissioners' Church designed by Thomas Taylor in Gothic Revival style, it is in stone with a roof of Westmorland blue slate. The church consists of a nave with a clerestory, north and south aisles, a shallow chancel, and a west tower. The tower has three stages, angle buttresses surmounted by gablets and crocketed pinnacles, a south doorway, a three-light west window, a clock face on each front, and an embattled parapet. The windows in the body of the church have four-centred arched heads, there are embattled parapets along the nave and the aisles, and the east window has five lights.	II
119, 121 and 123 Fartown; 53.78791°N 1.66644°W		Early 19th century	A row of three cottages in stone with quoins, gutter brackets, and a stone slate roof. There are three storeys, a double-depth plan, and three bays. The doorways and windows have plain surrounds.	II
129 Fartown; 53.78781°N 1.66620°W	—	Early 19th century	A pair of mirror-image cottages, later combined, in stone, with a stone slate roof and coped gables. There are two storeys and two bays. The doorways have monolithic jambs, the windows in the upper floor are mullioned, and in the gable end is a blocked lunette with a keystone.	II
1–10 Woodfield Terrace; 53.79273°N 1.65968°W		Early 19th century	A terrace of ten stone cottages with an eaves band, moulded gutter brackets, and stone slate roofs with coped gables. There are two storeys, and each house has one bay. The outer cottages have doorways with monolithic jambs, and the others have paired doorways and share a common jamb. The windows are mullioned with three lights, and some single-light windows have been inserted.	II
Barn west of Nesbit Hall; 53.78478°N 1.67601°W	—	Early 19th century (probable)	The barn or coach house, which has been converted into a dwelling, is in stone with a stone slate roof. There are two storeys and four bays. In the centre is a segmental-arched entrance, now glazed, with voussoirs and a keystone. The doorways at the ends have monolithic jambs, and there are two pitching holes.	II
Former Victoria Hotel; 53.79787°N 1.65363°W		Early 19th century	The former public house is on a corner site and is in stone with a slate roof. There are two storeys and an attic, and facing the road are three bays with a pedimented gable. In the centre is a doorway with pilasters, an entablature, and a decorated lintel. The windows are sashes, in the tympanum is a lunette, and the splayed corner contains a blocked doorway.	II
Former vicarage 53.79417°N 1.66660°W		1831	The vicarage, later extended and used for other purposes, is in stone with two storeys, a symmetrical front of three bays, an additional bay on the left and a rear wing at right angles. The original windows and the doorway have four-centred arched heads, and the doorway has a hood mould.	II
Former Crown Inn; 53.79782°N 1.65623°W		1833	The public house is in stone with a cornice and blocking course, and a stone slate roof with coped gables. There are two storeys and a symmetrical front of three bays. In the centre is a doorway with monolithic jambs, and above is a dated wooden plaque. The outer bays contain two-storey segmental bay windows with mullions.	II
Independent School; 53.79169°N 1.67060°W		1850	The former school is in stone, with moulded gutters, and a tile roof with coped gables, There is a single storey and seven bays. In the centre is a gabled porch containing a doorway with monolithic jambs, a fanlight and a cornice, and a date plaque above. In the outer bays, the windows are arched and have imposts and keystones.	II
National Westminster Bank; 53.79682°N 1.66302°W		c. 1890	The bank is on a corner site, it is in stone on a plinth, and has a roof of Westmorland green slate. There are two storeys, attics and basements, and a symmetrical front of five bays, the end bays canted and gabled. In the centre is an arched portal with engaged Composite columns of polished granite, a cornice surmounted by heraldic beasts with shields, and a blocking course inscribed "BANK". Above is a three-light cross window with Ionic pilasters, and a gable with ogee-domed pinnacles and a finial. The outer bays contain cross windows and balustraded parapets, and in the left bay is a balcony.	II
Trinity Methodist Church; 53.79746°N 1.66254°W		1898–99	The church is in sandstone with a Welsh blue slate roof. There are two storeys, a symmetrical front of five bays, and seven bays along the sides. The middle three bays contain a Corinthian portico, and the flanking bays have Corinthian pilasters and a full entablature. In the centre bays there are round-arched windows, and a doorway with imposts and a keystone. At the top is a pediment with a moulded surround, a tympanum containing carving, and a ball finial. Above the right bay is a balustraded parapet, and the left bay rises to a tower with clock faces, triangular pediments, and a copper ogee cap with a weathervane.	II
Original grammar school 53.79900°N 1.66363°W		1911	The school is in sandstone with a Westmorland green slate roof. There are two storeys, attics and a basement, and a U-shaped plan, with a symmetrical front range of 15 bays, and rear wings. The middle three bays project with quoin pilasters, and a gabled parapet, and in the centre is a Roman Ionic porch with an open pedimented gable. The outer bays have square towers stepped parapets, cornices and lead domes. In the intermediate bays are cross windows, and alternate bays have gabled dormers.	II
War memorial 53.79249°N 1.66856°W		c. 1921	The war memorial is by a road junction, and it consists of a cenotaph in Portland stone, surmounted by a bronze statue depicting a soldier in battledress. On the corners of the cenotaph are channelled quoins, and on the sides are inscribed panels, above which are bronze wreaths. The cenotaph stands on a base of three steps, and has a plinth with bronze plaques containing the names of those lost in the World Wars.	II
