= The Yorkshire Post =

Daily newspaper reporting on parts of northern England

- Yorkshire's National Newspaper

- Front page of The Yorkshire Post on 5 April 2024, reporting an update on the Murder of Sharon Beshenivsky that occurred in 2005.
- Type: Daily newspaper
- Format: Broadsheet
- Owner: Yorkshire Post Newspapers (National World)
- Editor: James Mitchinson
- Founded: 1754
- Headquarters: Leeds, England
- Circulation: 8,421 (as of August 2025)
- Sister newspapers: Yorkshire Evening Post
- ISSN: 0963-1496
- OCLC number: 53257737
- Website: www.yorkshirepost.co.uk

The Yorkshire Post is a daily broadsheet newspaper, published in Leeds, Yorkshire, England. Founded in 1754, it primarily covers stories from Yorkshire, although its masthead carries the slogan "Yorkshire's National Newspaper". It was previously owned by Johnston Press and is now owned by National World.

The paper's head office is in Leeds and the current editor is James Mitchinson. It considers itself "one of Britain's most trusted and historic newsbrands."

== History ==
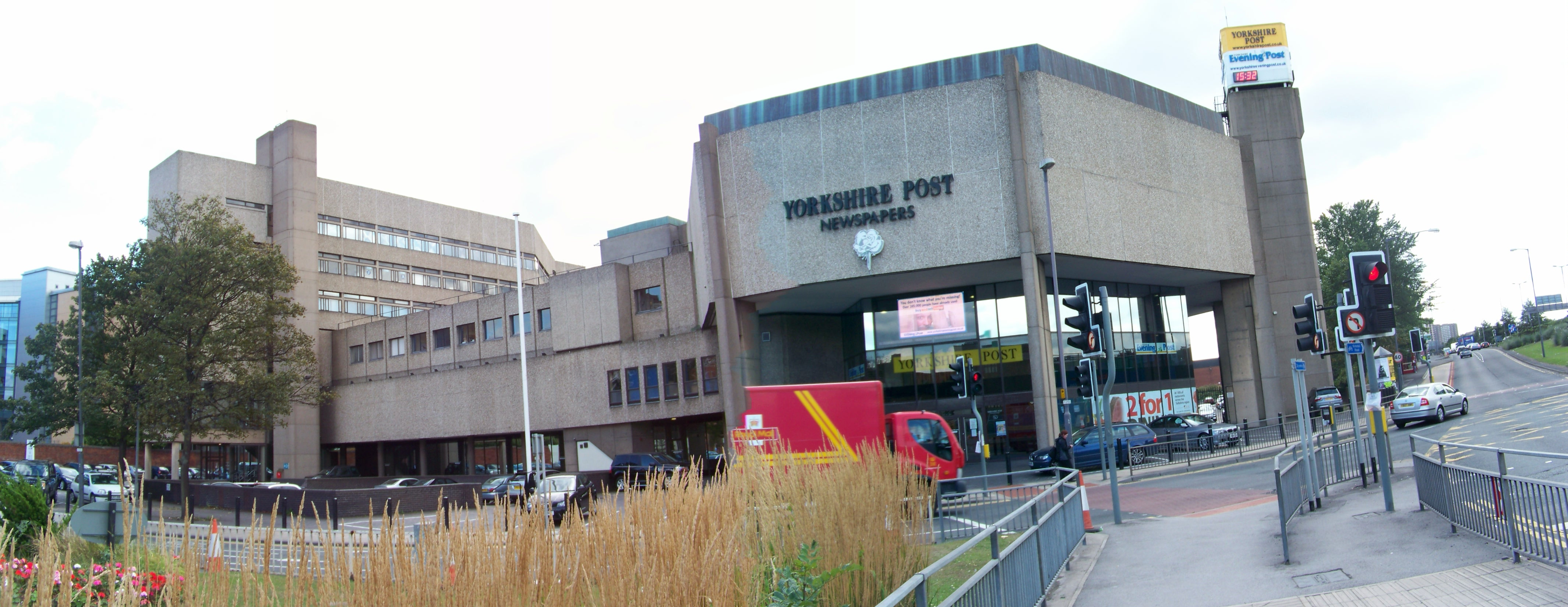
The former Yorkshire Post headquarters at Wellington Street, Leeds.

The paper was founded in 1754, as the Leeds Intelligencer, making it one of Britain's first daily newspapers. The Leeds Intelligencer was a weekly newspaper until it was purchased by a group of Conservatives in 1865 who set up the Yorkshire Conservative Newspaper Company Limited then published daily under the current name.

The first issue of The Yorkshire Post, on 2 July 1866, included the following statement:

the political principles of this journal are Conservative; while supporting every practical improvement, it will resist organic changes ... It will be at once conservative and progressive, a foe to democracy and revolution, but the firm friend of all constitutional reform.

— The Yorkshire Post, 2 July 1866

The newspaper broke the story of the Edward VIII abdication crisis under the editorship of Arthur Mann. In 1939, The Yorkshire Post absorbed a rival, the Leeds Mercury, which was founded in 1718 and was liberal in comparison to the Leeds Intelligencer from the late 18th century, and under the editorship of Edward Baines and his son (also named Edward Baines). At its peak in the 1950s, The Yorkshire Post sold 120,000 copies a day. This figure had dropped to 40,000 by 2012, rising to nearer 90,000 on a weekend. By the second half of 2017, it was selling less than 22,000 copies a day, and circulation further declined to just 18,534 for the period January to June 2019. As well as publishing regular supplements on sport, rural affairs, culture and motoring it runs an extensive business section with two weekly pull-out supplements.

In 2012, as its parent company Johnston Press sought to cut costs, it was merged with the Yorkshire Evening Post – the local newspaper for the Leeds city region - with the then editor, Peter Charlton, overseeing both titles. The merger saw the formation of combined departments for news, business, sport and features – with correspondents writing for both titles.

In February 2012 Johnston Press announced that printing of the Yorkshire Post and Yorkshire Evening Post in Leeds would be switched to their plant at Dinnington near Sheffield and the Leeds printing facility closed.

In September 2013, it was announced the Wellington Street premises would be demolished. Journalists had already vacated the building. Preliminary demolition began in March 2014, while in April 2014 it was announced the tower would be spared.

In March 2014, 'The' was reintroduced on the name of the paper after 46 years.

The Yorkshire Post achieved wider attention during the 2019 general election campaign, following the publication of a story about a boy being treated on the floor of Leeds General Infirmary which was published by sister title the Yorkshire Evening Post. The papers faced criticism on social media and in correspondence from readers, and editor James Mitchinson wrote an open letter to a reader defending the titles and their journalism.

== Editors ==
Adapted from the official website:

- 1754: Griffith Wright
- 1785: Thomas Wright
- 1805: Griffith Wright Jr
- 1819: William Cooke Stafford
- 1822: Alaric Watts
- 1842: W. T. Bolland
- 1848: Christopher Kemplay
- 1866: John R. K. Ralph
- 1882: Charles Pebody
- 1890: H. J. Palmer
- 1903: J. S. R. Phillips
- 1920: Arthur Mann
- 1939: Linton Andrews
- 1961: Kenneth Young
- 1964: J. Edward Crossley
- 1969: John Edwards
- 1989: Tony Watson
- 2003: Rachael Campey
- 2004: Peter Charlton
- 2013: Jeremy Clifford
- 2015: James Mitchinson

== Former journalists ==
- Keith Waterhouse (1929–2009), author of Billy Liar
- Barbara Taylor Bradford (1933-2024), author of A Woman of Substance
