= William Denholm Barnetson =

English newspaper proprietor (1917–1981)

The Right Honourable The Lord Barnetson
- Baron Barnetson in 1978
- Born: William Denholm Barnetson; 21 March 1917; Westminster, London
- Died: 12 March 1981 (aged 63)
- Education: Royal High School, Edinburgh; Edinburgh University
- Occupations: newspaper proprietor television executive
- Spouse: Joan Fairley Davidson
- Children: 4

William Denholm Barnetson, Baron Barnetson (born 21 March 1917, Edinburgh – 12 March 1981, Westminster, London) was a newspaper proprietor and television executive.

== Early life and education ==
He was educated at the Royal High School, Edinburgh, and Edinburgh University. Whilst at university aged 19 he set himself up as a freelance reporter on the Spanish Civil War. Returning to university in 1940 he took his MA.

== War service ==
During World War II he served as a Major in the Anti-Aircraft Command, a part of the army. After the war he was set the task of reorganising German newspaper and publishing industries in the British occupation zone of Germany. He was responsible for the launch of Die Welt choosing Axel Springer as its publisher.

== Career ==
Returning to Edinburgh from 1948 to 1961 he worked for the Edinburgh Evening News eventually becoming General Manager.

In 1962 he was recruited by Harley Drayton as director of United Newspapers becoming chairman in 1966. Within three years he had doubled the size of United acquiring of Yorkshire Post Newspapers and Punch magazine.

He had directorships of several other organisations and was chairman of Reuters from 1968 to 1979 during which time its turnover rose from £6m to £73m. From 1979 he was chairman of Thames Television.

== Personal life ==
He was the son of William Barnetson and Isabella "Ella" Grigor Moir. In July 1940 he married Joan Fairley Davidson, daughter of William Fairley Davidson and Agustina Bjarnarson. They had a son and three daughters.

Barnetson was knighted in 1972 and created a life peer on 14 July 1975 as Baron Barnetson, of Crowborough in the County of East Sussex.
