= Post Hill =

Woodland in Leeds, England

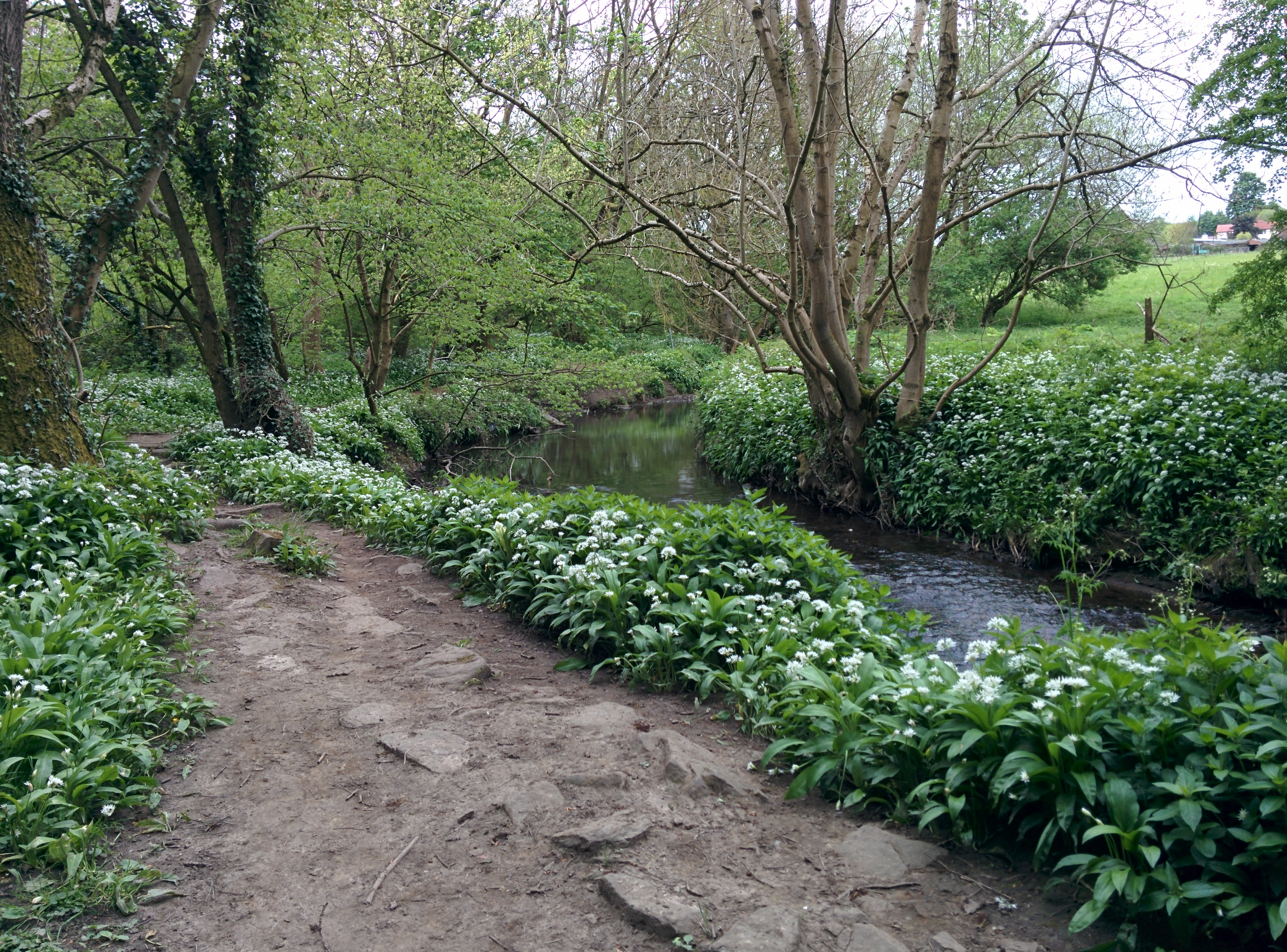
- Track and stream in springtime
- Interactive map of Post Hill
- Type: Local nature reserve
- Location: Pudsey, West Yorkshire
- Coordinates: 53.793°N 1.637°W
- Area: 28 hectares (69 acres)

Post Hill is a designated Leeds Nature Area on the western end of Farnley, and partly in Pudsey. It is situated mostly east of Pudsey Beck and Farnley Beck, between Wood Lane in the north and Troydale Lane in the south, and forms part of the West Leeds Country Park.

The area of 28.04 hectares consists largely of a hillside covered in woodland and some grassland. Openings offer views across West Leeds, in particular from the top of the hill which at an altitude of about 125 m a.s.l. is one of the highest points in the local area. The site is protected by Fields in Trust through a legal "Deed of Dedication" safeguarding the future of the space as public recreation land for future generations to enjoy.

== History ==
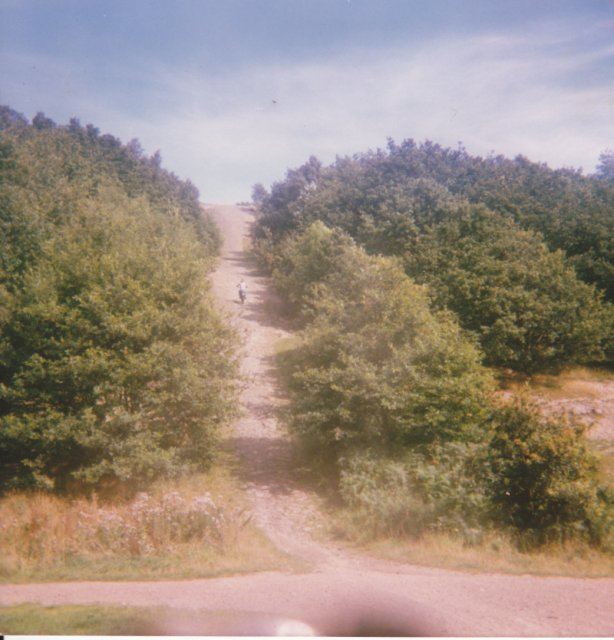
Motorcycle trial track up Post Hill, 1987

The name of the area originates from the newspaper Yorkshire Evening Post, which acquired the area and sponsored motorcycle speed and climbing events on the site from 1926. The western aspect of Post Hill, laid with a cobbled track up the hillside, was said to be the steepest hill climb in the world. Before the acquisition, the northern part of the area was known as Park Spring, and the southern part as Jonas Wood.

During World War II Post Hill was the location of POW camp No. 91, where Italian and German prisoners were held to work on farms in the surroundings. After the war the camp was used for displaced persons from Europe. In 2002 Post Hill passed into the ownership of Leeds City Council and is being returned to its natural state.

== Flora ==
Most of Post Hill is covered in oak-birch woodland, in the southern part there are stretches of semi-natural ancient woodland that has contained trees since before the year 1600. Tree species include oak, birch, ash, hawthorn, hazel, yew, and field maple. In the undergrowth, bluebells, brambles, bracken, hart's tongue fern, and woodrush are found, as well as ramsons (wild garlic), lesser celandine, wood anemone, yellow archangel, and sweet cicely. Two large areas of acid grasslands and meadows remain on the eastern side of the beck, and one west of it, adjacent to Pudsey Road. Wildflowers in these meadows include bird's foot trefoil, oxeye daisies, autumn hawkbit, tansy, and red clover. Fungi such as sulphur tuft and stinkhorn are also found.

== Fauna ==
The woodlands are home to roe deer and to various species of birds, such as great spotted woodpecker and tawny owl, as well as several species of bat, among them Leisler's bat. Along the beck, mallards, kingfishers, grey wagtails, water rails, and grey herons can be observed. Brown trout are breeding in the waters, as are mayfly. Newts are found in the still water ponds.

== Tourism and sports ==
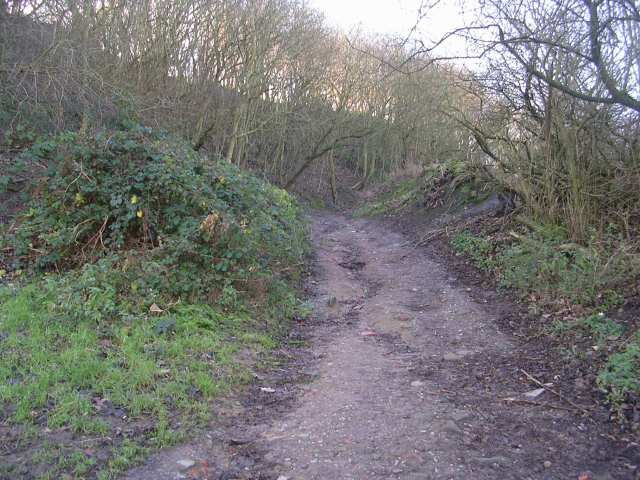
Footpath from Wood Lane up Post Hill, 2007

A nature trail of about 2 miles, funded by National Lottery Awards For All Fund, is routed through the site, and several other paths are available. Parking for visitors is possible at Wood Lane.

Motorcycle trials, organised by West Leeds Motor Club, are still held in the area, but ad-hoc motorcycling is strictly prohibited. Post Hill is also the location of running events.

== Literature ==
- "A History of Post Hill". Leeds: Friends of Post Hill.
