= Linton Andrews =

British journalist and newspaper editor

Sir William Linton Andrews
- Born: 1886-05-27; Kingston upon Hull
- Died: 1972-09-27
- Occupation(s): British journalist and newspaper editor
- Known for: Andrews was a president of the Guild of British Newspaper Editors

Sir William Linton Andrews (27 May 1886 – 27 September 1972) was a British journalist and newspaper editor.

== Early life ==
Andrews was born in Kingston upon Hull on 27 May 1886. He was the son of William Andrews and Jeanie Leslie Andrews. He was educated at Hull Grammar School. He was married to Gertrude Douglas. He died on 27 September 1972, aged 86.

== Career ==
Andrews served as a subaltern in World War I with the Black Watch. He recounted his experiences in the J. A. Hammerton Great War book series I Was There.

His first stint of journalism was for the Sheffield Telegraph. He worked as a journalist for a number of local newspapers. He became editor of the Leeds Mercury from 1923 until it merged with the Yorkshire Post in 1939. He then succeeded Arthur Mann as editor of the Yorkshire Post.

== Distinctions ==
Andrews was a president of the Guild of British Newspaper Editors. He was also a founder member of the Press Council, and served as its chairman between 1955 and 1959.

Andrews was knighted in 1954.

Media offices
Preceded by Arthur Mann	Editor of the Yorkshire Post; 1939–1961	Succeeded by Kenneth Young
