= Yorkshire Post Newspapers =

English newspaper publishing company

Yorkshire Post Newspapers are publishers of the Yorkshire Post and Yorkshire Evening Post. They were based at offices in Wellington Street, in November 2012 they moved to Number 1 Leeds, Whitehall Road, where they took four floors in the managed building Leeds these were vacated in 2023, West Yorkshire. They are ultimately owned by National World.

The company was formed as "Yorkshire Conservative Newspaper Company Limited" in 1865, and published the Leeds Intelligencer (founded 1754) then published as the Yorkshire Post and Leeds Intelligencer, before it was renamed the Yorkshire Post (first published on Monday 2 July 1866).

The company acquired the Leeds Mercury in 1923 and merged it with the Yorkshire Post in 1939. The company was renamed "Yorkshire Post Newspapers" in 1969.

The first chairman was William Beckett-Denison, from a Leeds banking family (Beckett's Bank was founded in 1774 and acquired by Westminster Bank in 1921). Successive chairmen were members of the Beckett family until the retirement of Rupert Beckett in 1950.

They also print other local titles, such as the Dewsbury Reporter, Morley Observer and Batley News.

== See also ==
- William Denholm Barnetson
