= Yorkshire Evening Post =

English daily evening newspaper

- Type: Daily newspaper
- Format: Tabloid
- Owner: National World
- Editor: Laura Collins
- Founded: 1890; 136 years ago
- Political alignment: Labour
- Headquarters: Whitehall Road, Leeds, West Yorkshire, England
- Circulation: 2,702 (as of August 2025)
- Sister newspapers: The Yorkshire Post
- ISSN: 0963-2255
- Website: www.yorkshireeveningpost.co.uk

The Yorkshire Evening Post (YEP) is a regional daily newspaper covering the City of Leeds. Founded in 1890, it is published by Yorkshire Post Newspapers.

Despite having coverage on and being sold across West Yorkshire, the Yorkshire Evening Post traditionally provides close reporting on Leeds United and Leeds Rhinos as well as the Yorkshire County Cricket Club.

The City of Leeds has two further widely circulated local papers, being the Wetherby News and the Wharfedale and Airedale Observer.

== History ==
The paper was first published in 1890 by the Yorkshire Conservative Newspaper Company Limited who already published the Broadsheet newspaper The Yorkshire Post. Its main competitor was the Yorkshire Evening News which folded in 1963.

In 1925 the Yorkshire Evening Post produced a separate edition for South Yorkshire printed simultaneously in Doncaster. It was closed in 1970 and became the Doncaster Evening Post until it folded in 1983.

In 1967 United Newspapers Ltd merged with Yorkshire Conservative Newspaper Company Limited to form Yorkshire Post Newspapers which enabled them to move to a new £5 million premises on Wellington Street in 1970.

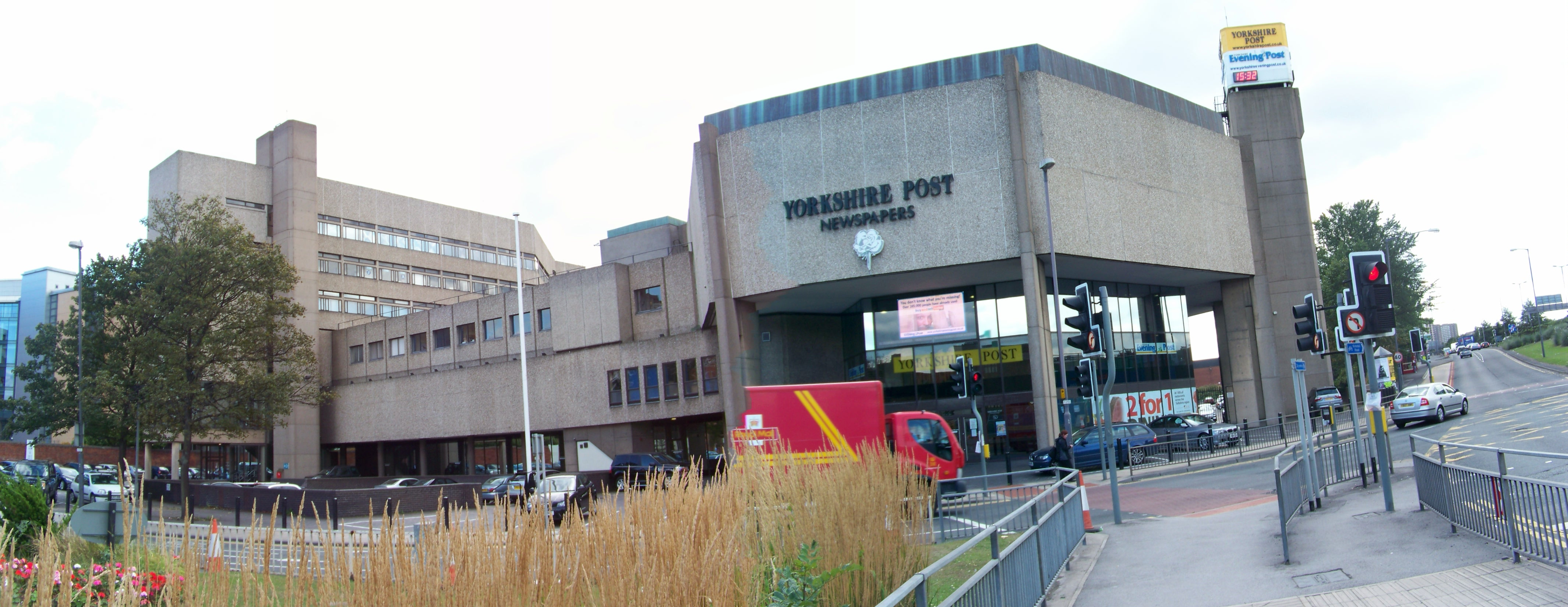
Former headquarters in Leeds

Johnston Press bought the Yorkshire Evening Post and The Yorkshire Post in 2002 for £570 million. In 2012, Johnston Press merged the Yorkshire Evening Post and The Yorkshire Post with then editor Peter Charlton overseeing both papers and correspondents writing for both titles. That same year, Johnston Press announced that it would close Yorkshire Post Newspapers headquarters on Wellington Street and move printing to Dinnington near Sheffield while journalists moved to new offices on Whitehall Road.

In September 2013, it was announced the Wellington Street premises would be demolished. Preliminary demolition began in March 2014. The following month it was announced the tower would be spared.

== Sponsorships ==
Starting in 1926, the Yorkshire Evening Post sponsored motorcycle trial events on Post Hill, an area near Farnley specifically acquired for this purpose.

The Yorkshire Evening Post announced it would be the main shirt sponsor of Leeds United for the 1991–92 season.

== Former journalists ==
- Keith Waterhouse (1929–2009), author of Billy Liar
- Barbara Taylor Bradford (1933–2024), author of A Woman of Substance
- Mark Knopfler (1949–) British guitarist, singer, songwriter, record producer (Junior reporter)

== Availability ==
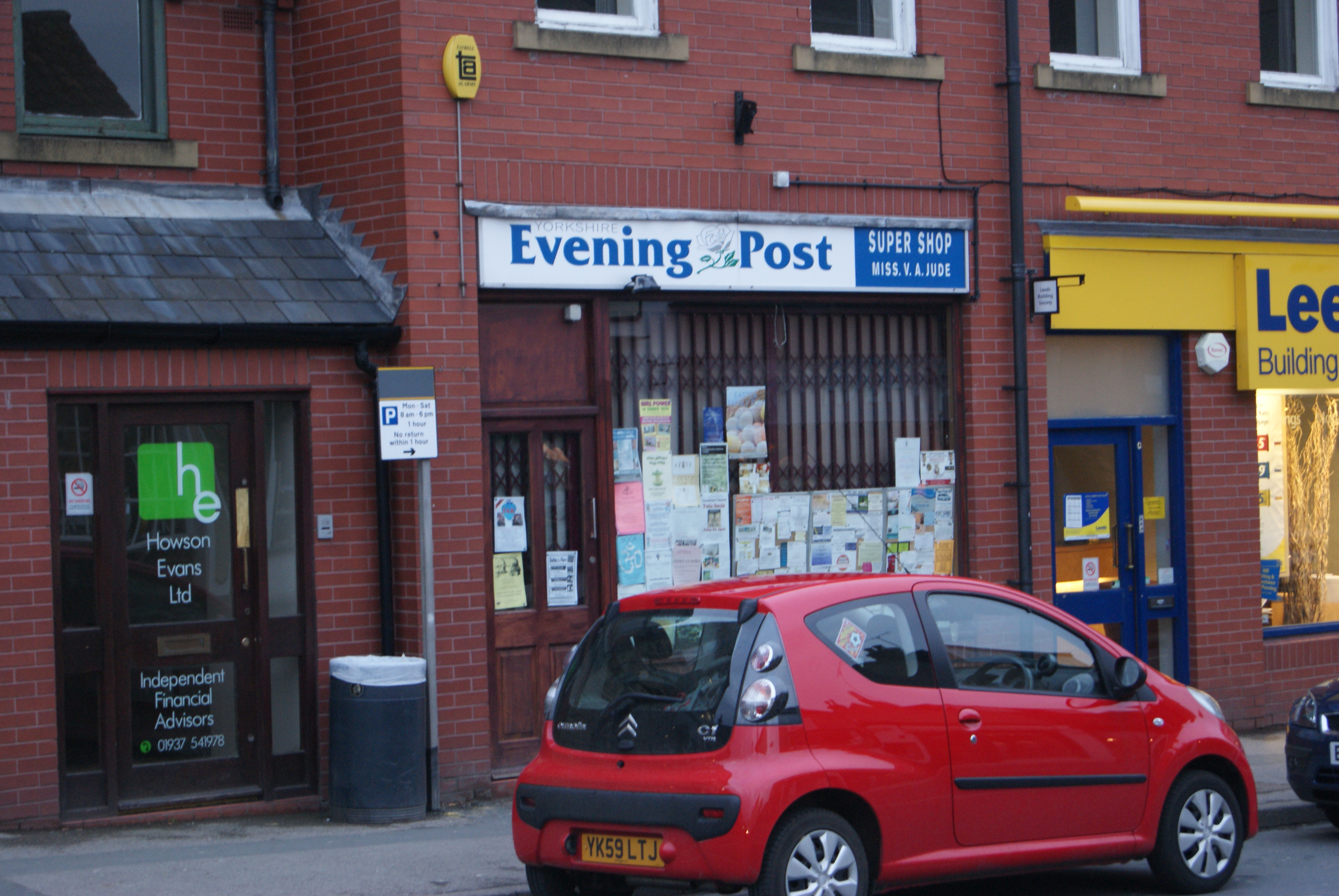
A newsagents in Boston Spa with Evening Post signage

The Yorkshire Evening Post is widely available across the City of Leeds as well as areas around Harrogate, Wakefield, Dewsbury, and Ilkley. An online edition is also available.
