= Pudsey Beck =

Stream in West Yorkshire, England

Pudsey Beck Farnley Beck
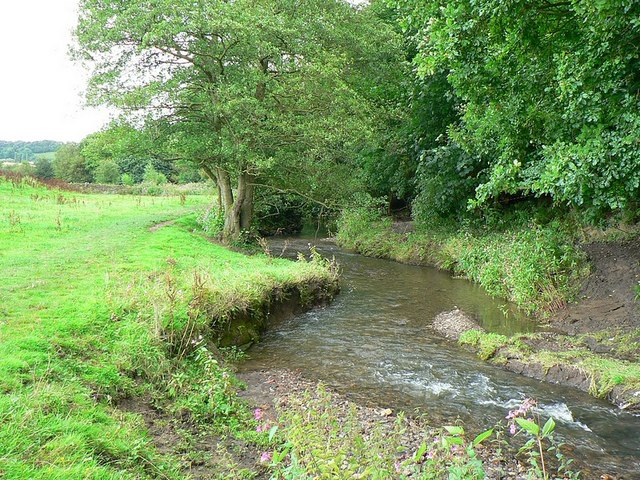
- Pudsey Beck near South Park Farm
- Etymology: Pudsey, Farnley; Beck (stream)

Location
- Country: United Kingdom
- Constituent country: England
- Region: Yorkshire and the Humber
- Ceremonial county: West Yorkshire
- Metropolitan Borough: City of Leeds

Physical characteristics
- Source confluence: Confluence of Tyersal Beck and Holme Beck
  - location: near Fulneck
  - coordinates: 53°46′46″N 1°40′6″W
- Mouth: Farnley Balancing Reservoir
  - location: Farnley, West Yorkshire
  - coordinates: 53°47′40″N 1°37′15″W

Basin features
- River system: Tyersal Beck, Holme Beck
- Tributaries
  - right: Tong Beck

Pudsey Beck is a watercourse in West Yorkshire, England which borders Fulneck (Leeds) and Tong Village (Bradford). It forms the southern and eastern boundary of the area of Pudsey town, after which it is named, and continues as Farnley Beck along the northern edge of Farnley.

== Course ==
Pudsey Beck originates from the confluence of Tyersal Beck and Holme Beck near the bridge of Keeper Lane, between Pudsey and the eastern parts of Tong, at the eastern end of Park Woods. The stream runs east past Fulneck Golf Club and is joined near Union Bridge at Roker Lane Bottom by Tong Beck. There it turns north and runs past Troydale. About 500 m north of Troydale it turns northwest, and then northeast, running beneath Post Hill. Upon entering the area of Farnley, approximately 600 m southwest of the bridge of Wood Lane, it changes its name to Farnley Beck, continues from Wood Lane in a southeastern direction, passes under the Ring Road, continues between the latter and Pudsey Road, passes under Butt Lane and flows into Farnley Balancing Reservoir.

Leeds Country Way runs beside Pudsey Beck between Keeper Lane bridge and Roker Lane Bottom. A footpath also accompanies the stream from Roker Lane Bottom until Farnley.

== Use ==
Pudsey Beck was used to power several mills, and in particular as a source of water for the Troydale Mill of Lister & Sons Ltd. (now closed), a producer of finished cloth, who in the late 1970s consumed approximately 1136 m³ water per day.

== Other information ==
When the Pudsey Loop railway was built in the late 19th century, the crossing of Tyersal Beck, Pudsey Beck's northern contributor, required the building of a high embankment which was said to have been the largest man made embankment in Europe at that time.

== Gallery ==
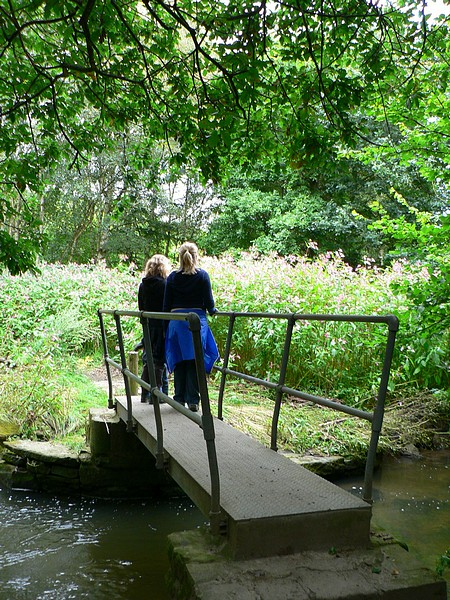
Bridge of Keeper Lane over Pudsey Beck

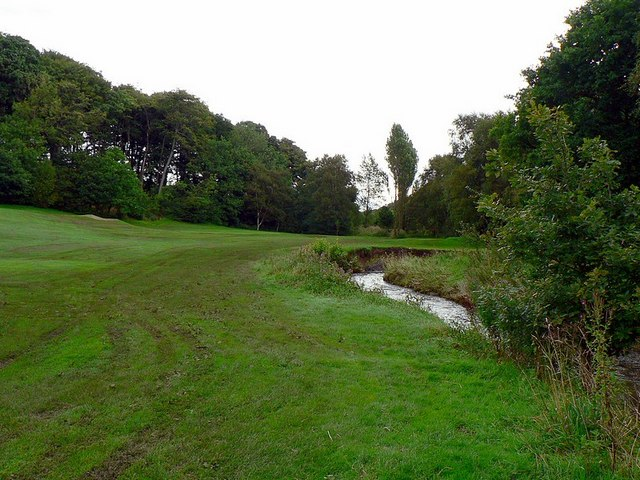
Near Fulneck golf course

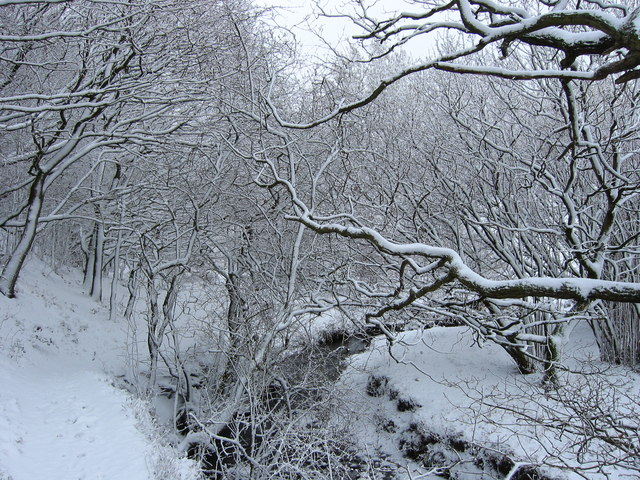
Near Fulneck golf course, in winter

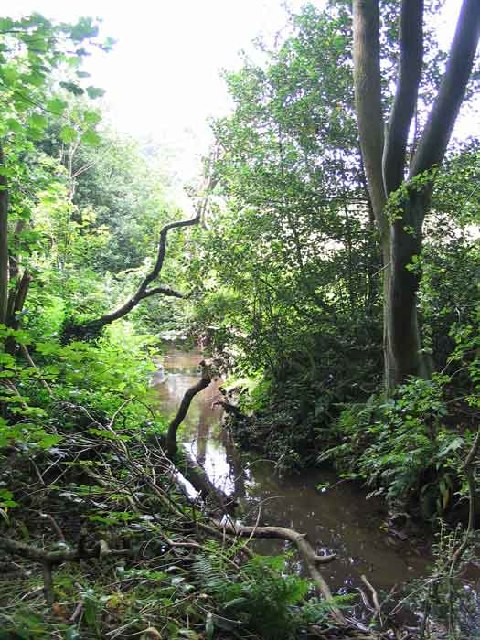
Pudsey Beck near Roker Lane Bottom

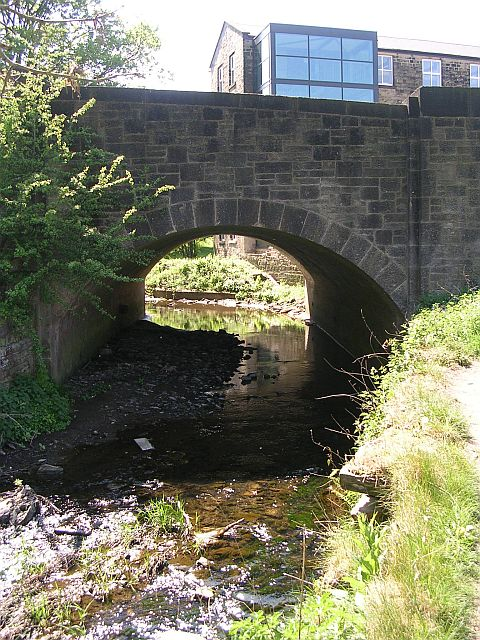
Bridge of Roker Lane (Union Bridge) over Pudsey Beck

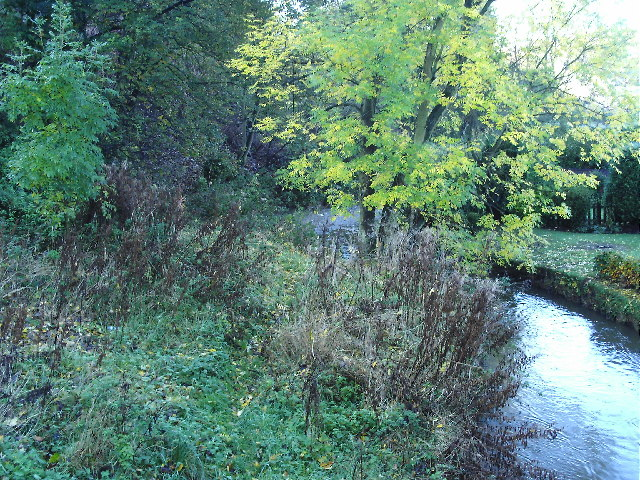
Farnley Beck west of Wood Lane

== See also ==
- Pudsey
- Fulneck
