= Cockersdale =

Coordinates: 53.769°N 1.666°W

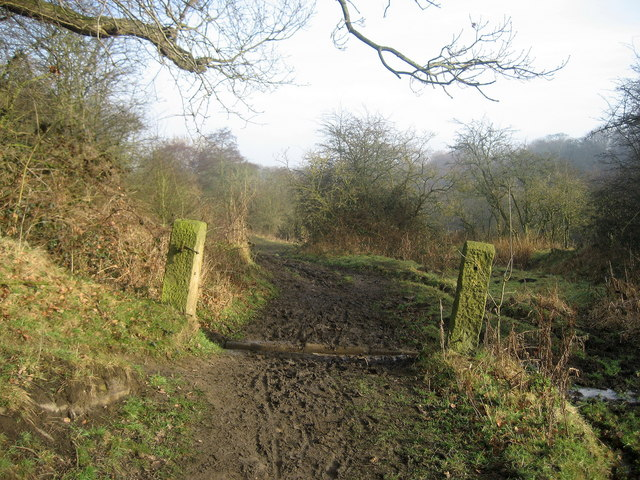
Leeds Country Way passing through Cockersdale

Cockersdale is a location near Tong, south-west of Leeds, West Yorkshire, England. The Leeds Country Way follows the valley known as Cockers Dale, along Tong Beck, from the A58 road northwards. The beck forms the boundary between the metropolitan districts of Leeds and Bradford for much of the valley, but the settlement identified on Ordnance Survey maps as Cockersdale is within Leeds.
