= Tong (ward) =

Ward in the City of Bradford, West Yorkshire, England

Coordinates: 53°46′16″N 01°40′07″W

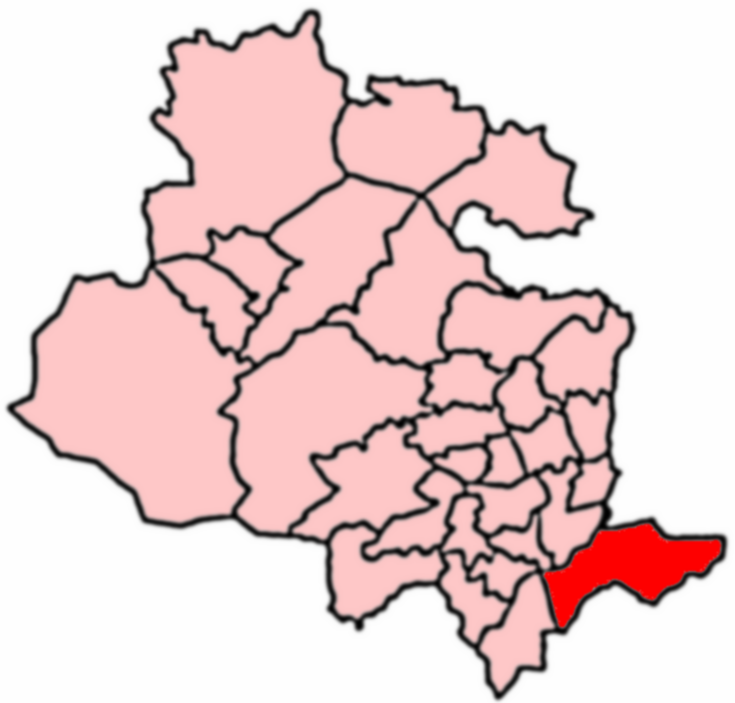
- 2004 Boundaries of Tong Ward
- Population: 20,608 (ward. 2011)
- UK Parliament: Bradford South
- Councillors: Matt Edwards (Green Party); Celia Hickson (Green Party); Ursula Sutcliffe (Green Party)

Tong (population 17,069 - 2001 UK census) is a ward within the City of Bradford Metropolitan District Council, West Yorkshire, England, named after Tong village which is its oldest settlement. The population at the 2011 Census was 20,608.

== Geography ==
The ward is in the extreme south-east of Bradford District in a green wedge of land between the urban areas of Bradford and Leeds, the centre of the former being 3 miles (5 km) to the north-west and the centre of the latter being about 4 miles (6 km) to the north-east. Although surrounded by Green Belt, most of the settlements nearest to Tong are urban in character, Tong Street being 1.5 miles (2.4 km) to the west of the village, Drighlington 1 mile (1.6 km) to the south, Gildersome, 1.5 miles (2.4 km) to the south-east and New Farnley 1.25 miles (2 km) to the east (distances from the boundaries of the ward). The rural village of Bankhouse and the Moravian settlement of Fulneck in Pudsey are about 0.6 miles (1 km) to the north of Tong with Cockersdale 0.6 miles (1 km) to the south-east. East Bierley, immediately adjacent in the south, is part of Kirklees.

== History ==
The ward was formed from the former civil parish of Tong which in the 19th century included the settlements of Dudley Hill, Tong Street, Westgate Hill, and Holme.

The Tong political ward includes the urban areas of Dudley Hill, and the council estates of Bierley, West Yorkshire, Holme Wood and Sutton which is part of Tyersal. These settlements stretch along the main thoroughfare, Tong Street, which is part of the A650 road. To the west of the ward is Woodlands which is part of Oakenshaw and to the very east of the ward is Tong Village on Tong Lane. Tong Village is a small, rural village surrounded by farmers' fields, and home to a historic local cricket club, Tong CC.

Coal and ironstone were mined in the area in the 19th and the early 20th centuries, and several mines are recorded.

The ward was a former Labour stronghold but, in 2019, the Labour candidate tied with the Green Party candidate Matt Edwards. In 2021, Edwards became the first non-Labour Party councillor in the ward since it was created, with 47% of the vote. In 2022 and 2023 Labour lost both remaining councillors to the Green Party.

== Governance ==
Councillors

Tong is represented on Bradford Council by three Green councillors; Matt Edwards, Celia Hickson and Ursula Sutcliffe

Election	Councillor	Councillor	Councillor
2004	James Cairns (Lab)	John Ruding (Lab)	Michael Johnson (Lab)
2006	James Cairns (Lab)	John Ruding (Lab)	Michael Johnson (Lab)
2007	James Cairns (Lab)	John Ruding (Lab)	Michael Johnson (Lab)
2008	James Cairns (Lab)	John Ruding (Lab)	Michael Johnson (Lab)
2010	Alan Wainwright (Lab)	John Ruding (Lab)	Michael Johnson (Lab)
2011	Alan Wainwright (Lab)	John Ruding (Lab)	Michael Johnson (Lab)
2012	Alan Wainwright (Lab)	John Ruding (Lab)	Michael Johnson (Lab)
2014	Alan Wainwright (Lab)	John Ruding (Lab)	Michael Johnson (Lab)
2015	Alan Wainwright (Lab)	Tess Peart (Lab)	Michael Johnson (Lab)
2016	Alan Wainwright (Lab)	Tess Peart (Lab)	Michael Johnson (Lab)
2018	Alan Wainwright (Lab)	Tess Peart (Lab)	Michael Johnson (Lab)
2019	Alan Wainwright (Lab)	Kausar Mukhtar (Lab)	Michael Johnson (Lab)
2021	Alan Wainwright (Lab)	Kausar Mukhtar (Lab)	Matt Edwards (Green)
2022	Celia Hickson (Green)	Kausar Mukhtar (Lab)	Matt Edwards (Green)
2022	Celia Hickson (Green)	Ursula Sutcliffe (Green)	Matt Edwards (Green)

indicates seat up for re-election.

== See also ==
- Listed buildings in Bradford (Tong Ward)
