= Swinnow =

Coordinates: 53.802°N 1.645°W

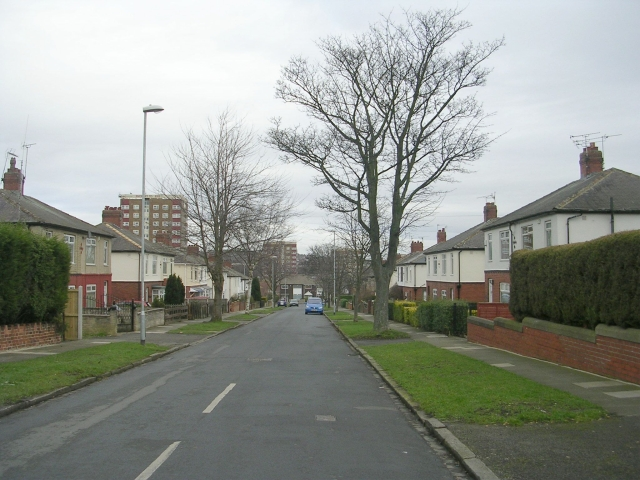
- Swinnow Avenue, Swinnow, 2009

- Location within West Yorkshire
- Metropolitan borough: City of Leeds
- Metropolitan county: West Yorkshire
- Region: Yorkshire and the Humber
- Country: England
- Sovereign state: United Kingdom
- Post town: PUDSEY
- Postcode district: LS13
- Dialling code: 0113
- Police: West Yorkshire
- Fire: West Yorkshire
- Ambulance: Yorkshire
- UK Parliament: Leeds West and Pudsey

Swinnow (derived from Anglo-Saxon Swin (swine) and how (hill), possibly also a contraction of "Swine Moor" in the Yorkshire dialect) is a housing estate in west Leeds, West Yorkshire, England. It is situated between Bramley and Pudsey on the west side of the outskirts of Leeds and is currently part of the Leeds City Council ward of Pudsey.

== History ==
Swinnow was part of the civil parish of Bramley. Bramley and Swinnow were part of the Leeds rhubarb fields, a part of the so-called 'Rhubarb Triangle', which accounted for a large portion of British rhubarb production from the 1800s until the Second World War. Every January at rhubarb picking time a special train would depart Bramley station at 8:30 pm every night bound for market towns all over the country ready for the next day.

After the Second World War the population of Leeds was growing and consequently new cheap council houses were needed. The area of the fields in the Swinnow/Bramley area were considered a perfect location. They were sold on compulsory purchase to the council, and development started on housing estates over the old rhubarb fields. An industrial estate was established south of the settlement, where soft drinks manufacturer Britvic is a major employer.

Swinnow is now clearly integrated into the larger Leeds area. Nevertheless, the history of the area is preserved, in that the stories, memories and knowledge of the residents were compiled into a small volume published by Patchwork press in 1994.

== Amenities ==
There are two churches in Swinnow, Christ the Saviour Anglican Church and St. Mark's Methodist Church.

== See also ==
- Listed buildings in Pudsey
