= Leeds Intelligencer =

Leeds Intelligencer Leedes Intelligencer
- The Altar, the Throne and the Cottage
- Type: Weekly
- Founded: 1754
- Ceased publication: 1866 (became Yorkshire Post and Leeds Intelligencer)
- City: Leeds
- Country: England
- OCLC number: 25855905

The Leeds Intelligencer, or Leedes Intelligencer, was one of the first regional newspapers in Great Britain. It was founded in Leeds, West Riding of Yorkshire, England, in 1754 and first published on 2 July 1754. It was a weekly paper until it was renamed and became the daily Yorkshire Post and Leeds Intelligencer, first published on Monday 2 July 1866, until 1883 when the "and Leeds Intelligencer" was dropped from the title. It was published under the motto of The Altar, the Throne and the Cottage and was, from the outset, a conservative newspaper. It dropped the extra 'e' from the name Leedes in 1765 and was recognised as being anti-Catholic and being opposed to Chartism.

In 1865 it was acquired by the Yorkshire Conservative Newspaper Company Limited (now Yorkshire Post Newspapers).
