= Listed buildings in Bradford (Tong Ward) =

Tong is a ward in the metropolitan borough of the City of Bradford, West Yorkshire, England. It contains 48 listed buildings that are recorded in the National Heritage List for England. Of these, two are listed at Grade I, the highest of the three grades, five are at Grade II*, the middle grade, and the others are at Grade II, the lowest grade. The ward is southeast of the centre of Bradford and contains the district of Bierley, which is effectively a suburb of the city, the outlying villages of Tong and Holme, and surrounding areas. The village of Tong contains the two Grade I listed buildings, a large hall, and a church, both with associated listed buildings. Most of the other listed buildings are houses and cottages, farmhouses and farm buildings. The rest include a set of stocks, another church, public houses, a former school, a former cinema, a pinfold, pump, troughs and a smithy, and a war memorial.

== Key ==
Grade	Criteria
I	Buildings of exceptional interest, sometimes considered to be internationally important
II*	Particularly important buildings of more than special interest
II	Buildings of national importance and special interest

== Buildings ==
Name and location	Photograph	Date	Notes	Grade
439–443 Shetcliffe Lane, Bierley; 53.76155°N 1.73151°W		15th to 16th century	A house, later divided, it was originally timber framed, and was encased in gritstone in 1625. The house has a stone slate roof with saddlestones and kneelers. There are two storeys, and it consists of a main range and a gabled cross-wing on the left. The doorway has a four-centred arch in a square head, and a cornice on consoles carrying two initialled shields and a dated central panel. The windows are mullioned.	II*
Tan House Farmhouse and Cottage; 53.75875°N 1.73273°W	—	1650	The cottage is the older, the farmhouse being added later. They are in gritstone and sandstone with stone slate roofs. The cottage has two storeys at the front, one at the rear, and a rear outshut. It has quoins, and a doorway with a dated lintel. The farmhouse is taller, with two storeys, and has kneelers, and both parts have mullioned windows, with some mullions removed, and some with hood moulds.	II
Maythorne Farmhouse; 53.77673°N 1.68235°W	—	17th century (probable)	The farmhouse was enlarged in the 18th century, the original part is in gritstone, and the extension is in sandstone. The farmhouse has quoins, a stone slate roof, two storeys, and a rear outshut. The windows are mullioned, and there is an external brick staircase.	II
Rooley Cottage Farmhouse; 53.76916°N 1.73704°W	—	17th century	The farmhouse is in rendered gritstone, possibly with a timber framed core, and has a stone slate roof. There are two storeys, it contains a mullioned window with some mullions removed, and the other windows have been altered.	II
Rose Garth; 53.75969°N 1.74147°W	—	17th century	A farmhouse that was refronted in the late 18th century, and extended in 1783. It is in sandstone on a plinth, with a frieze, a shallow coved cornice and blocking course, and a stone slate roof. There are two storeys, a symmetrical front of three bays, and a later gabled extension on the left. The central doorway has a semicircular fanlight, and above it is a semicircular-arched window; both have a moulded impost and a keystone, the keystone on the window with initials and the date. The outer bays contain tripartite sash windows with mullions, and at the rear is a round-headed stair window.	II
Barn, Shawfield Farm; 53.76259°N 1.67725°W	—	17th century (probable)	The barn, which was later heightened, is in gritstone and sandstone, with quoins and a stone slate roof.	II
430 Shetcliffe Lane and 6 Walker Street, Bierley; 53.76194°N 1.73167°W	—	Mid to late 17th century	A former farmhouse in gritstone, it has a stone slate roof with saddlestones, kneelers and a finial. There are two storeys, the windows are mullioned with hood moulds, there is a blocked mullioned window, and in the west gable end is a round-headed window with a hood mould.	II
The Old Vicarage; 53.77070°N 1.66853°W	—	Mid to late 17th century	The former vicarage, which was extended in 1739, is in gritstone, and has a stone slate roof with coped gables. There are two storeys and an L-shaped plan. Most of the windows are mullioned, and there are some sash windows.	II
Ryecroft Hall; 53.77116°N 1.69622°W		1669	The hall is in gritstone and has a stone slate roof with saddlestones and kneelers. There are two storeys, a rectangular plan, and a porch with a flat coped roof. The hall window is mullioned and transomed with eight lights, the other windows are mullioned, and there is a continuous hood mould over the ground floor windows, stepped over the hall window. The doorway has a chamfered surround, a slightly cambered head, and a large dated and initialled lintel.	II*
3 and 5 Tong Lane, Tong; 53.77057°N 1.66839°W		Late 17th century	A pair of houses consisting of a main range and a gabled wing on the left. The front of the main range and part of the rear wing are in red brick, the rest is in gritstone, and the roof is in stone slate. There are two storeys, the main range has a string course, and the wing has a saddlestone, a kneeler, and a lantern finial with ball capping. The doorway have chamfered jambs, and the windows are mullioned with up to six lights.	II
Church Farmhouse; 53.77037°N 1.66896°W	—	Late 17th century	The farmhouse is in rendered gritstone, with a brick wing added in the 18th century. It has a stone slate roof, the main part has two storeys, the front facing the road has two bays, and the wing has one storey and two bays. The windows facing the road are mullioned with two lights and hood moulds, and elsewhere are three-light mullioned windows. The doorway has squared jambs.	II
Manor House, Tong; 53.77364°N 1.66496°W		Late 17th century	The former manor house was extended in the 18th century, and has been restored. It is in gritstone and sandstone with quoins, and a stone slate roof with saddlestones and kneelers. There are two storeys, and the house consists of a main range, a gabled bay on the right, and the extension projecting on the left. The doorway has a shaped lintel, and the windows are mullioned.	II
Raikes Hall Farmhouse; 53.77268°N 1.69669°W	—	Late 17th century	The farmhouse, which was later extended to the east, is in sandstone, with quoins, and a stone slate roof with a saddlestone. There are two storeys, and it contains four-centred arched doorways, and mullioned windows with hood moulds, with some mullions removed.	II
16 Ned Lane and barn, Holme Village; 53.78040°N 1.70091°W	—	1687	The older part is the barn, the house being rebuilt in about 1840, and both are in sandstone with stone slate roofs. The house has two storeys, quoins at the rear, three bays, and a central doorway with a cornice. The barn is at the rear and is dated.	II
Newhall; 53.76837°N 1.74307°W		1692	The hall, at one time a golf club house, is in gritstone, with a string course, and a stone slate roof with saddlestones, kneelers, and finials. There are two storeys and an H-shaped plan, consisting of a hall range and gabled wings, and a later rear extension. Incorporated in the right wing is a two-storey porch with splayed jambs, impost mouldings, and a semicircular moulded arch, above which is a framed panel with scrollwork in relief, initials and the date. Most of the windows are mullioned and transomed with hood moulds, and in the gables are small round-headed windows with panelled spandrels.	II*
Ryecroft Farmhouse; 53.77120°N 1.69702°W	—	c. 1700	The farmhouse is in gritstone with quoins and a stone slate roof. There are two storeys, and the windows either have a single light, or are mullioned with up to six lights. The doorway has a rusticated and chamfered surround, a cambered head, and a massive lintel.	II
Tree House Farmhouse; 53.78171°N 1.71642°W		c. 1700	The farmhouse is in sandstone with quoins, a moulded string course, and a stone slate roof with moulded gable coping, and shaped kneelers. There are two storeys and a symmetrical front of three bays. The central doorway has a chamfered surround and a plain lintel and above it is an upright oval window carved from two stones. The outer bays contain two-light mullioned windows.	II
18 and 20 Ned Lane and barn, Holme Village; 53.78068°N 1.70131°W	—	Late 17th or early 18th century	A barn, a house and a later cottage in a group, all with stone slate roofs. The house is in gritstone with two storeys, and an attic. Its broad east gable end was refronted in about 1840–50, and contains a doorway with pilasters. Most of the windows are mullioned, and some are sashes. The barn is dry stone walled, and contains quoins. The cottage is in sandstone, and has one storey, a doorway with squared jambs, and mullioned windows.	II
Gib Stubbing Farmhouse; 53.77090°N 1.68386°W	—	Late 17th or early 18th century	The farmhouse is in gritstone with a stone slate roof and two storeys. The doorway has a chamfered surround, and a massive pediment-shaped lintel. The windows are mullioned, those in the ground floor with hood moulds.	II
Holme Farmhouse; 53.77595°N 1.69988°W	—	Late 17th or early 18th century	The farmhouse is in gritstone with quoins and a stone slate roof. There are two storeys, three bays, and a full-length rear outshut. The doorway has squared jambs, and the windows are mullioned with some mullions removed.	II
Lockwood Farmhouse; 53.76063°N 1.73006°W	—	Late 17th or early 18th century	The farmhouse is in gritstone and has a stone slate roof with saddlestones. There are two storeys, three bays, and a rear outshut. The doorway has squared jambs, the windows are mullioned with some mullions removed, and there is a 19th-century dormer.	II
Tong Hall; 53.77230°N 1.67055°W		1702–04	The hall, which was extended in 1773–74, and later used as offices, is in red brick, with a stone basement and stone dressings. The hall has rusticated quoins, plat bands, and the wings have modillion eaves cornices. There are three storeys and a basement, and a front of seven bays. The middle three bays are slightly recessed under a pediment that contains festoons, and is surmounted by three urns. Steps lead up to the central doorway which has an architrave, a festooned frieze, and a dentilled cornice on carved cornices. The doorway has a fanlight containing a reset glazed sundial dated 1709. Above the doorway is a Baroque achievement with a coat of arms. Most of the windows are sashes with architraves, and there are mullioned windows in the basement. On the west front is a porch with Doric columns, and on the north front are canted bay windows.	I
426 and 428 Shetcliffe Lane, Bierley; 53.76192°N 1.73152°W	—	Early 18th century	Formerly the wing of a larger house, later two cottages, they are in gritstone, and have a stone slate roof with saddlestones and kneelers on the east gable end. There are two storeys and a rear outshut. The windows are mullioned with some mullions removed, and in the gable end are small round-headed windows.	II
195 and 197 Toftshaw Lane, East Bierley; 53.76219°N 1.71524°W	—	Early 18th century	A pair of stone cottages that have a stone slate roof with hollow chamfered gable copings. The front has been altered, and at the rear are two mullioned windows with some mullions removed.	II
9 Tong Lane, Tong; 53.77067°N 1.66773°W		Early 18th century	A pair of cottages, later combined, in gritstone, with quoins and a stone slate roof. There is one storey, the doorway has squared jambs, and the windows are mullioned with three lights and hood moulds.	II
St James' Church, Tong; 53.77079°N 1.66896°W		1727	The church, which incorporates earlier material, is in gritstone with a stone slate roof. It consists of a nave, a north aisle, a chancel, and a west tower. The tower has quoin pilasters, a clock face, a cornice, and a parapet with carved urns on the corners. The windows and the doorway on the south side of the church are round-headed with impost blocks and keystones, on the north side the windows have straight heads and two lights, at the west end is a re-used Perpendicular window, and the east window, dating from about 1882, is Gothic.	I
The Barn; 53.77094°N 1.66626°W	—	Early to mid 18th century	A farmhouse and a barn in one range, the barn converted for residential use. The building is in gritstone and sandstone, partly rendered, with stone slate roofs. There are two storeys and an outshut. The doorways have squared jambs, and the windows are mullioned, with some mullions removed.	II
Stable Court and Home Farmhouse, Tong Hall; 53.77221°N 1.67130°W	—	Early to mid 18th century	The buildings were later extended to form two yards. They are in red brick on a plinth with sandstone dressings, a plat band and stone slate hipped roofs, and have two storeys. The original windows are mullioned with two lights, or framed oculi, and the later windows are sashes. The archway is cambered, and dated 1811.	II*
Barn west of Gib Stubbing Farmhouse; 53.77074°N 1.68447°W	—	18th century	The barn, which was extended in the 19th century, is in sandstone, with quoins and a stone slate roof. It contains a first floor doorway.	II
Barn, Holme Farm; 53.77603°N 1.69952°W	—	18th century	The barn is in sandstone, with quoins and a stone slate roof. It contains a recessed porch.	II
Gates and gate piers, St James' Church; 53.77054°N 1.66902°W		18th century	The gate piers flanking the entrance to the churchyard are in rusticated stone. Each pier has a panel with a roundel under the cornice, and it is surmounted by a ball finial. The gates have arrow head and dog rails.	II
Gate piers, Tong Hall; 53.77050°N 1.66976°W	—	c. 18th century	The gate piers flanking the entrance to the drive are in stone. They are decorated with garlands and each has a cornice.	II
Former kitchen garden wall, Tong Hall; 53.77113°N 1.66803°W	—	18th century	The wall enclosing the former kitchen garden is in red brick with stone coping. Part of the south wall contains flues.	II
Village stocks, Tong; 53.77054°N 1.66889°W		18th century	The stocks are outside the walls to the right of the entrance to the churchyard of St James' Church. They are in wood, and consist of two upright posts between which is a board with four holes for legs.	II
Raikes Farmhouse and barn 53.77334°N 1.69278°W	—	Mid to late 18th century	The farmhouse and barn are in one range, and are in sandstone with a stone slate roof. The house has two storeys, a doorway with squared jambs, and mullioned windows. The barn to the right contains a segmental archway with voussoirs, and is dated 1839.	II
Ryecroft Farm Cottage; 53.77126°N 1.69703°W	—	Mid to late 18th century	The cottage is in sandstone, rendered at the front, with a stone slate roof. There are two storeys, the doorway has squared jambs, and the windows are mullioned with two lights.	II
Ryecroft Farm Cottages; 53.77124°N 1.69724°W		Mid to late 18th century	A pair of sandstone cottages with quoins and a stone slate roof. There are two storeys, and a rear wing dated 1752. The doorways have squared jambs, there is one single-light window, and the other windows are mullioned with three lights. In the rear wing is a blocked segmental archway.	II
St John's Church, Bierley; 53.77054°N 1.73238°W		1766	The church was designed by John Carr and enlarged in 1828 and 1831. It is in sandstone, and consists of a nave, a north transept and a west porch. Both ends have pediments with modillion brackets. On the west pediment is a bell turret with engaged Tuscan columns, a dome, and an obelisk-spire with a weathervane. The porch has Tuscan double columns, and the doorway has a Gibbs surround. Above the porch is a recessed arch containing a plaque with a cornice, and in the pediment is an oculus. At the east end is a Venetian window, and along the sides are round-headed windows.	II*
Barn northeast of Ryecroft Hall; 53.77137°N 1.69584°W	—	Late 18th century (probable)	The barn is in sandstone with a stone slate roof. In parts, it has two storeys, and it contains openings with squared surrounds.	II
Post Office and Parish Room; 53.77075°N 1.66687°W		Late 18th or early 19th century	Originally a school with the master's house on the left, later extended, and used as the parish room and post office. The building is in sandstone with quoins and a stone slate roof. The post office has two storeys, and contains a doorway and a three-light mullioned window in each floor, all with hood moulds. The parish room, under the same roof, has one storey, three bays, and a lower single-bay extension to the right. It contains four three-light mullioned windows.	II
25 Ned Lane, Holme Village; 53.77739°N 1.70130°W	—	c. 1800	Originally a pair of cottages, the building is in sandstone at the front and red brick on the sides, with quoins and a stone slate roof. There are two storeys and a rear outshut. The doorways have squared jambs, and the windows are mullioned.	II
Barn southeast of Raikes Hall Farmhouse; 53.77232°N 1.69608°W	—	c. 1800	The barn is in sandstone, with quoins, a stone slate roof, and two storeys. It contains a segmental archway with voussoirs, flanked in the upper storey by plain windows with squared surrounds.	II
The 6 Acres; 53.76099°N 1.67877°W		c. 1800–20	The public house is in roughcast sandstone, with a sill band, bracketed eaves, and a stone slate roof. There are two storeys, a double pile plan, and a front of three bays. On the front are two canted bay windows, and a modern porch, the windows in the upper floor have squared surrounds, and elsewhere are mullioned windows.	II
The Greyhound Public House; 53.77135°N 1.66595°W		c. 1800–30	Originally an estate building, the public house is in rendered sandstone with a stone slate roof. There are two storeys and three bays. The doorway has chamfered jambs and a hood mould, and the windows are mullioned with three lights.	II
374 Rooley Lane, Bierley; 53.77034°N 1.73326°W	—	c. 1820–30	A vicarage, later a private house, it is in sandstone, with moulded eaves and a hipped slate roof. There are two storeys, an L-shaped plan, and a front of three bays. The doorway has a rectangular fanlight and a cornice on shaped brackets. The windows on the front are sashes, on the side are two-light mullioned windows, and at the rear is a round-headed stair window.	II
Former Dudley Hill Picture Palace; 53.77404°N 1.72662°W		1912	An early cinema, later used as a warehouse, it is in red brick with dressings in faience, and a slate roof, and is in Baroque style. There are two storeys, and a front of three bays. The front has a plinth, a cornice with egg and dart decoration on shaped corbels, and a decorated string course. There are pilasters at the corners and between the bays. The central entrance has a segmental arch with a quoined surround, and a dated triple keystone. Above the entrance is a segmental-arched tripartite window with a triple keystone, at the top is a broken segmental pediment containing lettering and elaborate decoration, and this is flanked by a shaped parapet.	II
Pinfold, pump, trough and smithy 53.77191°N 1.66460°W		Mid 19th century	The smithy is in sandstone with a stone slate roof. It has one storey, and contains three-light mullioned windows. To its left is a monolithic stone pump with a conical cap dated 1849, shaped stone troughs, and a horse pond. Behind it is a stone wall which extends to enclose a roughly semicircular pinfold.	II
Tong War Memorial; 53.76560°N 1.70536°W		1925	The war memorial in Tong Cemetery is in granite and sandstone. It consists of the statue of a soldier in battledress standing and leaning on a rifle. The statue is on a base of two steps on a pedestal, a plinth, and four steps. On the memorial are inscriptions and the names of those lost in the First World War.	II
