= Arthur Henry Mann (journalist) =

Arthur Henry Mann CH (7 July 1876 – 23 July 1972) was a British newspaper journalist, who edited the Yorkshire Post from 1919 to 1939, where he was known for his "resolute independence" and helped precipitate the crisis leading to the Abdication of Edward VIII by publishing criticism of the King.

== Journalism ==
Born in Warwick, Mann began his career with the Western Mail in Cardiff.

In 1919, he became editor of The Yorkshire Post. Under his editorship, the paper helped precipitate Edward VIII's abdication by breaking the press silence over the King's actions and publishing criticism of the King by the Bishop of Bradford. He opposed Neville Chamberlain's policy of appeasement, with the aid of his leader writer Charles Tower who had lived in Berlin.

As an editor, according to the Oxford Dictionary of National Biography, he was not a learned man and did not write much himself, but he had a good knowledge of world affairs and a shrewd nose for the newsworthy, as well as being a good judge of people.

He resigned from The Yorkshire Post in 1939 following repeated run-ins with the owners, when they decided to merge the paper with the Leeds Mercury.

He was chairman of the Press Association from 1937 to 1938.

== Later career ==
He was a governor of the British Broadcasting Corporation from 1941 to 1946.

== Personal life, honours and death ==
In 1898, he married Aida Maggi, from Cardiff. After her death, in 1948 he married Alice Mabel Wright.

While on the Western Mail he played cricket for Glamorgan County Cricket Club, and reached near-county standard. Later he turned to golf.

He twice declined a knighthood in the 1920s, believing it might interfere with his journalism. In 1941, he became a Member of the Order of the Companions of Honour.

He had one son Eric Peter Wright who died in 2005, a grand son Christopher Wright, and three great granddaughters Isabella, Rowan, and Adeline.

Mann died in Folkestone, Kent, England on 23 July 1972.

Media offices
| Preceded by J. S. R. Phillips | Editor of the Yorkshire Post; 1920–1939 | Succeeded by Linton Andrews |
