= Holme Wood =

Housing estate in Bradford, West Yorkshire, England

Coordinates: 53.778°N 1.712°W

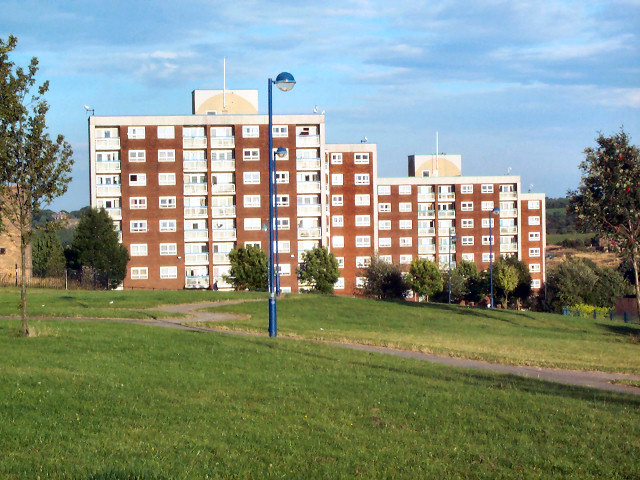
- Flats on Dane Court Road

- Location within West Yorkshire
- OS grid reference: SE189313
- Metropolitan borough: City of Bradford
- Metropolitan county: West Yorkshire
- Region: Yorkshire and the Humber
- Country: England
- Sovereign state: United Kingdom
- Post town: BRADFORD
- Postcode district: BD4
- Dialling code: 01274
- Police: West Yorkshire
- Fire: West Yorkshire
- Ambulance: Yorkshire

Holme Wood or Holmewood is a housing estate in Bradford, West Yorkshire, England.

== Geography and administration ==
Holme Wood is situated off Wakefield Road in the south-east of the City of Bradford and borders Tyersal. It is part of Tong ward. The estate is managed by Incommunities and Bradford Council. In 1996, it was one of the largest council-housing estates in West Yorkshire. Most of it consists of low-rise buildings, there are only two tall blocks of flats, namely Ogden House and Kelvin House on Dane Court Road. The estate is rambling; however, there are many pleasant green areas dotted around the estate, among them Valley Natural Play Park along the upper course of Holme Beck and Pit Hill Park at the boundary to the nearby village of Tong in the green belt.

== History ==
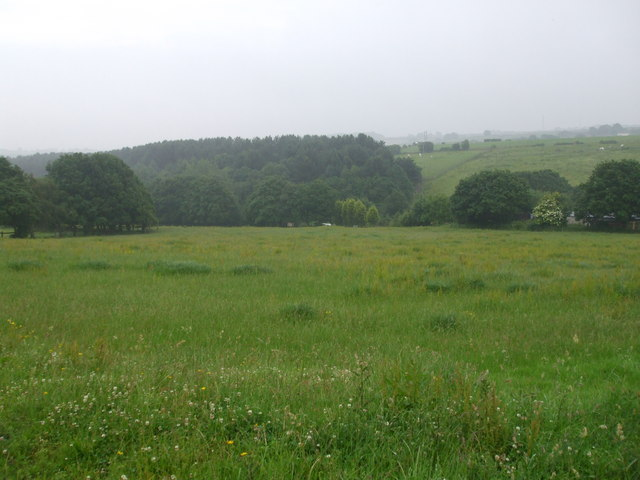
View towards Holme Wood from which the name of the settlement originated

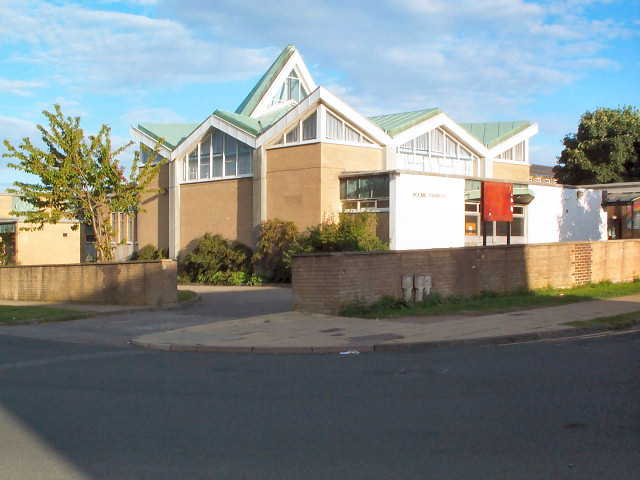
Holme Church

A small hamlet named Holme Shaw existed on Ned Lane, west of a forest called Holme Wood. Later it was simply known as Holme and was part of the civil parish of Tong. It is now part of Tong ward. The etymology of Holme Shaw was identified by Albert Hugh Smith as Old English holegn ('holly-tree') and sceaga ('copse'); Holme Wood means the same. Residents refer to it as Holmewood (all one word).

The present housing estate between Dudley Hill and Ned Lane was built in the 1950s, officially opening in 1957. The history of the estate in the twentieth century was characterised by the Bradford Telegraph and Argus as beginning as a 'pioneering housing estate', becoming 'a hot-bed of crime' around the 1980s, but undergoing 'a full regeneration programme' in the 1990s.

=== Taxi boycott ===
In September 2016, it was reported that several taxi companies had listed the estate as a 'no-go' area, due to anti-social attacks being carried out on drivers throughout 2016. Some incidents left drivers with black eyes, while others were subjected to being harassed for money after their windows were smashed in.

Subsequent to the taxi boycott, concerted efforts by Bradford South policing district, and by youth workers, have claimed some success in reducing anti-social behaviour on the estate. Some work has been funded by Comic Relief and has involved partnerships with Bradford City football club and Bradford Bulls rugby league club.

== Population ==
Pockets of Holme Wood are in the top 5% and 1% of the Governments Index of Deprivation (2015). The ethnic origin of vast majority of the population of the estate is White British; however, the number of residents belonging to ethnic minority groups has increased over recent years especially the British Pakistani community. Of the residents of Tong Ward, to which Holme Wood belongs, 82.8% were born in the United Kingdom, 0.4% in the Republic of Ireland, 3.1% in other EU countries, and 13.6% outside the EU.

== Notable people ==
Holme Wood is the birthplace of actresses Sophie McShera and Jennifer Metcalfe.

== Appearances in popular culture ==
Holme Wood is the setting of much of the 2021 film Ali & Ava.
