= Tong, West Yorkshire =

Village in West Yorkshire, England

Coordinates: 53.7711°N 01.6688°W

Tong
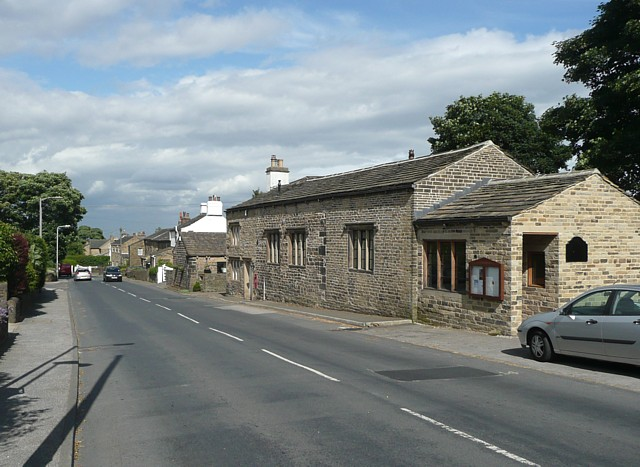
- Village hall on Tong Lane

- Location within West Yorkshire
- OS grid reference: SE221307
- Metropolitan borough: City of Bradford
- Metropolitan county: West Yorkshire
- Region: Yorkshire and the Humber
- Country: England
- Sovereign state: United Kingdom
- Post town: BRADFORD
- Postcode district: BD4
- Dialling code: 01274
- Police: West Yorkshire
- Fire: West Yorkshire
- Ambulance: Yorkshire
- UK Parliament: Bradford South

Tong or Tong Village is a village and former civil parish in the City of Bradford metropolitan district, West Yorkshire, England. It is a historic village, and gives its name to the larger electoral ward of Tong.

== History ==
Evidence of early activity within the Tong area is sparse, an undated flint found within the grounds of Tong Hall represents the prehistoric period. Later artefacts within the general area include a Roman pre-Flavian coin (i.e. before 69 AD) and two coins dating to the second and third centuries found in the vicinity of Westgate Hill.

The village was an integral part of the Tempest estate, comprising workers' cottages, farmsteads and ancillary buildings. By 1725 a linear settlement extended eastwards from the chapel, towards Keepers Lane and Hill Green. Dwellings were mainly located to the front of Tong Lane with barns or outbuildings to the rear. It is believed settlement may have initially comprised two focal points, near the church and at Hill Green. Rebuilding work/renovation of village buildings, undertaken by the Tempests, occurred in the 17th and early 18th centuries.

These works included the rebuilding of the 12th-century chapel by Sir George Tempest in 1727, and the construction of the village school and master's house in 1736. A vicarage also superseded the parsonage adjacent to the church. Church Farmhouse similarly dates from the 18th century. Although there is little remaining evidence of any permanent settlement of the area from prehistoric to through Roman times, St James Church provides conclusive evidence of an earlier settlement of some importance at Tong in Saxon times. Excavations undertaken during the restoration of the church in the 1970s uncovered the fragmentary walls and foundation stones of two earlier buildings contained within the footprint of the remains of a Norman-era church which was built circa 1140.

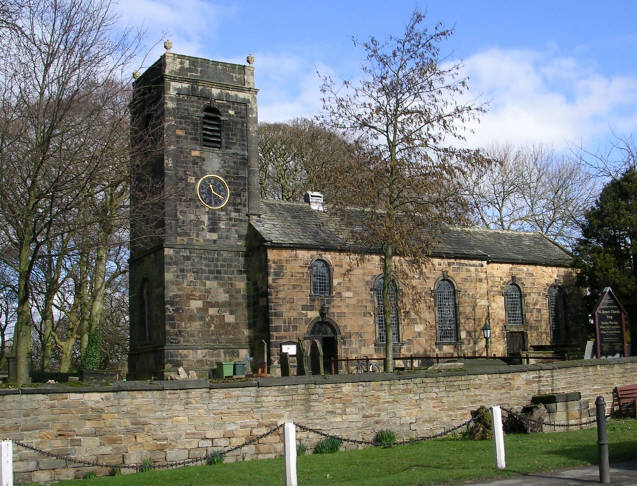
St James' Church, rebuilt in the 18th century, is of considerable historical interest.

The discovery of grave markers within these two buildings alludes to the fact that a church existed on the site of the present day church from the eleventh century, and, moreover, prior to the Norman invasion of 1066.

Around the time of the Norman invasion, it is known that Tong Manor was farmed and was owned by a Saxon named Stainulf. As happened across the country after 1066, the Norman invaders knocked down existing churches and built a new place of worship, often on the site of the church they demolished, and, under William the Conqueror, high ranking Normans were installed as the new lords and overlords of the English manors.

By the time of the Domesday Survey, in 1086, some twenty years after the invasion, Tong Manor was held by Ilbert de Lacy, an ally of William The Conqueror, who is recorded in the survey as holding 162 manors. Among de Lacy's holdings was all of what is now Bradford (excluding Eccleshill). At the time of the Domesday survey all manors which were held directly by de Lacy lay undeveloped wasteland, including the 2,000-acre (8.1 km^{2}) Tong Manor, although it is known that Tong was cultivated when in the possession of Stainulf.

Asolf, an extensive landowner in West Riding, appears to have been lord of Tong Manor from around 1135 to about 1159 and it is therefore probably he who rebuilt the church in about 1140 on the site of the demolished pre-Conquest church. Asolf had many sons, who, instead of taking the name Fitzasolf (son of Asolf) were named after where they were made lord of the manor on their father's death.

In this way, Asolf's son Richard de Tang (c.1130–c.1195) was the first in a line of Lords of Tong who would inhabit Tong Hall and oversee the running of the manor until 1941. The name Tong comes from the Old English term tang meaning tong or fork and refers to the village's position on a raised sliver of land between Ringshaw Beck and Cockersdale which converge at the eastern extreme of the manor.

Tong remained in the possession of the de Tangs as an agricultural manor for nine generations until the death of Hugh de Tong in 1445 and the passing of the manor to his grandson, John Mirfield, to which the woollen town of Mirfield got its name.

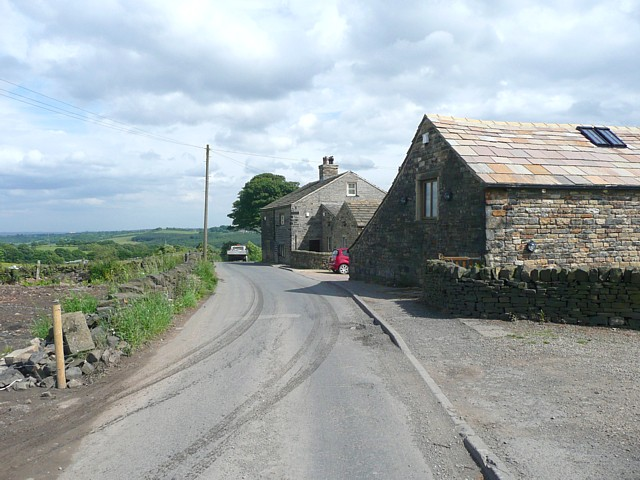
Holme Bank Farm on Ned Lane

Holme Bank, located nearby in Ned Lane, was an ancient holding, but the earliest actual record discovered so far is from "Bradford Archive" is 1562 (Reign of Elizabeth I). Holme Bank Farm like most of the surrounding farms and cottages were owned by the Tempest family of Tong Hall.

Tong Lane was described in the late 19th century as lined with old trees, with a parsonage, known as Lantern House, and former inn, The Griffin, standing adjacent to the church. The inn's license was subsequently transferred to the Greyhound Inn, a straw-thatched building on Tong Lane, but later moved to its present site, and thus, a griffin is the symbol of the historic pub village cricket team, Tong Cricket Club who have played in several cricket leagues in the West Yorkshire area.

Long since demolished buildings within the village included a wheelwright's shop and smithy adjacent to the pinfold at the junction of Keeper Lane. In order to prevent over-population of the village the Lord of the Manor discouraged new development. Some buildings were dismantled when they became vacant and the stone re-used.

In contrast landholdings elsewhere, such as at Tong Street (about one-and-a-half miles to the west) were sold, resulting in industrial, commercial and residential development. In the early 20th century the antiquarian, James Parker, described Tong village as set within a "charming" rural landscape, the village remaining the same "as it has done in generations past." According to the estate sale particulars of 1943 the majority of village buildings had retained their function as farmsteads and dwellings, many of the dwellings being single-storey cottages.

The preservation of the Hall and Park, and the Estate's influence on development has helped maintain the character of the village and buildings within it. Many buildings within the Conservation Area are Grade II listed structures dating between the 17th and 18th centuries, with Tong Hall and gatepiers to the entrance of the drive listed respectively as Grade I and Grade II* listed structures. Despite modern residential development the layout of the linear settlement today is very similar to that recorded in 1725.

== Governance ==
There is just one tier of local government covering Tong, being the City of Bradford Metropolitan District Council.

Tong was historically a township in the parish of Birstall. From 1866 Tong was a civil parish in its own right. In 1871 a local government district called Tong Street was established covering the western part of the parish, governed by a local board. The local government district was extended to cover the whole parish in 1877 at which point it was renamed Tong. Such local government districts were reconstituted as urban districts in 1894. Tong Urban District was abolished in 1899 and absorbed into the County Borough of Bradford, since when Tong has administratively been part of the city of Bradford.

Tong remained a civil parish within Bradford, but as an urban parish it had no parish council. In 1951 the parish had a population of 5,849. The parish was abolished in 1974 when the metropolitan district of Bradford was created, becoming an unparished area.

== Geography ==
Tong Village, approximately 4 miles (6 km) to the south-east of Bradford City centre, is situated at an elevation of 145 metres (476 ft) north of Ringshaw Beck, the land rising to an elevation of 167 metres (548 ft) at Hall Green. Formerly within the parish of Birstall the village is located on a prominent ridge between Pudsey Beck and Cockers Dale. Its place-name is derived from its location between the two valleys, from the Old English term tang, meaning tong or fork, such as a river fork.

== Landmarks ==
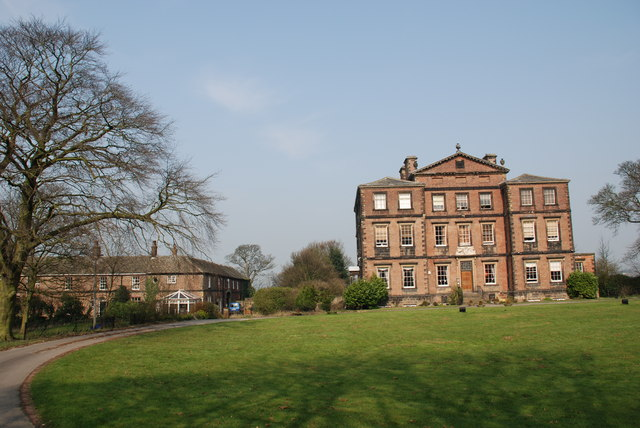
Tong Hall, now a conference centre

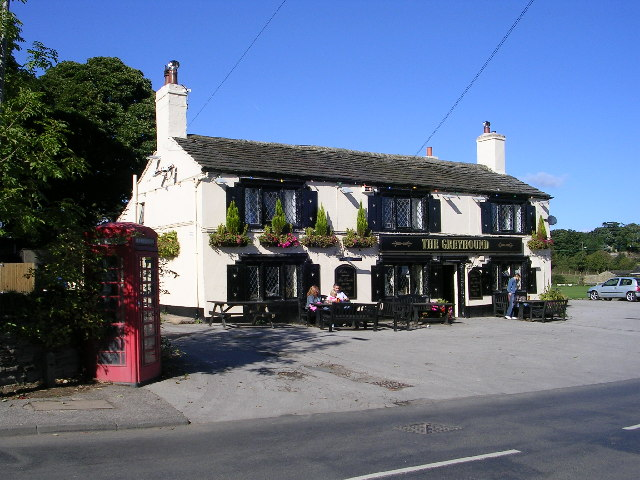
The Greyhound Inn

Tong Village forms part of Tong Conservation Area, which was originally designated in 1973. The designation covers virtually the entire village which extends in a linear fashion along Tong Lane, the main thoroughfare.

Tong village predates the Norman Conquest and was the seat of Tong Manor between the 13th and mid-20th centuries. The manor remained in the hands of the Tempest family, who resisted the expansion and industrialisation of the village, for some 400 years before selling the Hall and estate in 1941, to E. W. Towler director of Redpath Dorman and Long. Unusually, a great number of the buildings in the conservation area were built in the 18th century including Tong Hall (1702) and the adjacent courtyard (1711), St James's Church (1727), the school (1736) and several newly built and rebuilt farmhouses and estate cottages. These buildings used a mixture of red brick and local gritstone, making the conservation area unique in Bradford in terms of materials.

Tong Hall, a Queen Anne manor house built in the late 17th century, replaced an older building—a capital messuage (manor house) is recorded in 1343 as part of the holdings of the Tong family, but was destroyed by fire around 1700. In 1702 Sir George Tempest built the present Tong Hall to designs by Theophilus Shelton. Further alterations took place in 1773 under the direction of architect John Platt. The estate and hall remained with the Tempest family until 1941, when the hall was subsequently used for a number of functions such as a Co-operative Youth Centre, a training college, a hall of residence, a museum, and its current use as a business centre.

St James Church is the village's listed parish church (see the history section above). The 12th-century chapel situated on Tong Lane formed the southern boundary of Tong Park. Other structures included a water corn mill, documented in 1218/19. Archaeological investigations in 1979 found the remains of a probable earlier chapel, dating to the 11th century, standing within the foundations of the 12th-century chapel. A grave marker found during these works implies that there was a burial ground here prior to the 12th century, suggesting that Tong was possibly a pre-Conquest settlement.

A former schoolroom opposite the parish church is used as a village gathering place, and a learning centre. The village post office operated from these premises, but following recent post office closures, it is no longer operational.

On Tong Lane there is the Innovation Motorsports rally (and four by four) testing centre drive, a testing facility used by professional rally teams to ensure their up-and-coming drivers are up to scratch, before the major European rallies.

== See also ==
- Listed buildings in Bradford (Tong Ward)
