= Tyersal =

Village in West Yorkshire, England

Coordinates: 53.790°N 1.708°W

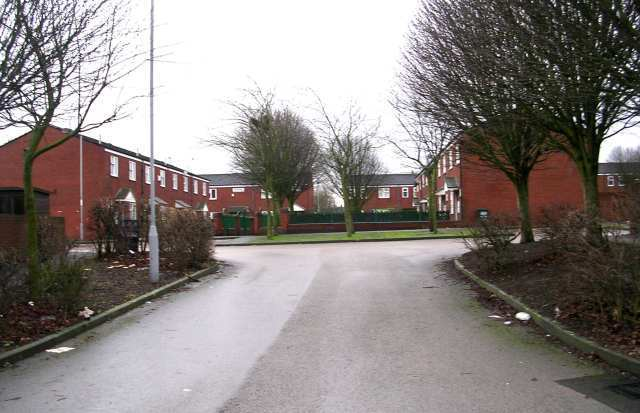
- Arkwright Street

- Location within West Yorkshire
- Metropolitan borough: Bradford, Leeds
- Metropolitan county: West Yorkshire
- Region: Yorkshire and the Humber
- Country: England
- Sovereign state: United Kingdom
- Post town: BRADFORD
- Postcode district: BD4
- Dialling code: 01274
- Police: West Yorkshire
- Fire: West Yorkshire
- Ambulance: Yorkshire

Tyersal is a village 2 miles (3 km) east of Bradford and 8 miles (13 km) west of Leeds, in the county of West Yorkshire, England. It has a population of 2,605 according to Bradford Community Statistics Project.

The district is split between both Bradford metropolitan borough and Leeds metropolitan borough, with east Tyersal sitting in the Pudsey ward of Leeds City Council.

== History ==
In 1894 Tyersall became a civil parish, being formed from the part of the parish of Pudsey in the County Borough of Bradford, on 25 March 1898 the parish was abolished and merged with Bradford. Tyersal joined Bradford in 1882 and part of it became part of the Leeds metropolitan district in 1974. Tyersal Hall is a late medieval grade II* listed building.

== Shops ==
On Tyersal Road there are six shops, including a Newsagents, Pharmacy, Cafe, tanning salon and a Takeaway.

== Transport ==
Currently there is the 633 service, operated by First Bradford, which travels between Tyersal Crescent and Shipley Market Square via Bradford Interchange. Additionally, TLC Travel operate the 630 on evenings and Sunday services between Bradford Interchange and Tyersal Crescent. Service 508 from Leeds to Halifax operated also by First Bradford, is every hour along Dick Lane at the bottom of Tyersal. Previously, service 66 (operated by First Leeds and then Centrebus) provided buses to Leeds and back (there were four services daily), although 2010 saw this service withdrawn, and now service 508 is the only remaining bus to Leeds.

New Pudsey railway station is around one and a half miles north-east of the village by road, where services are operated by Northern to Manchester Victoria, Blackpool North, Wakefield Westgate, York and Selby.

== Recreation ==
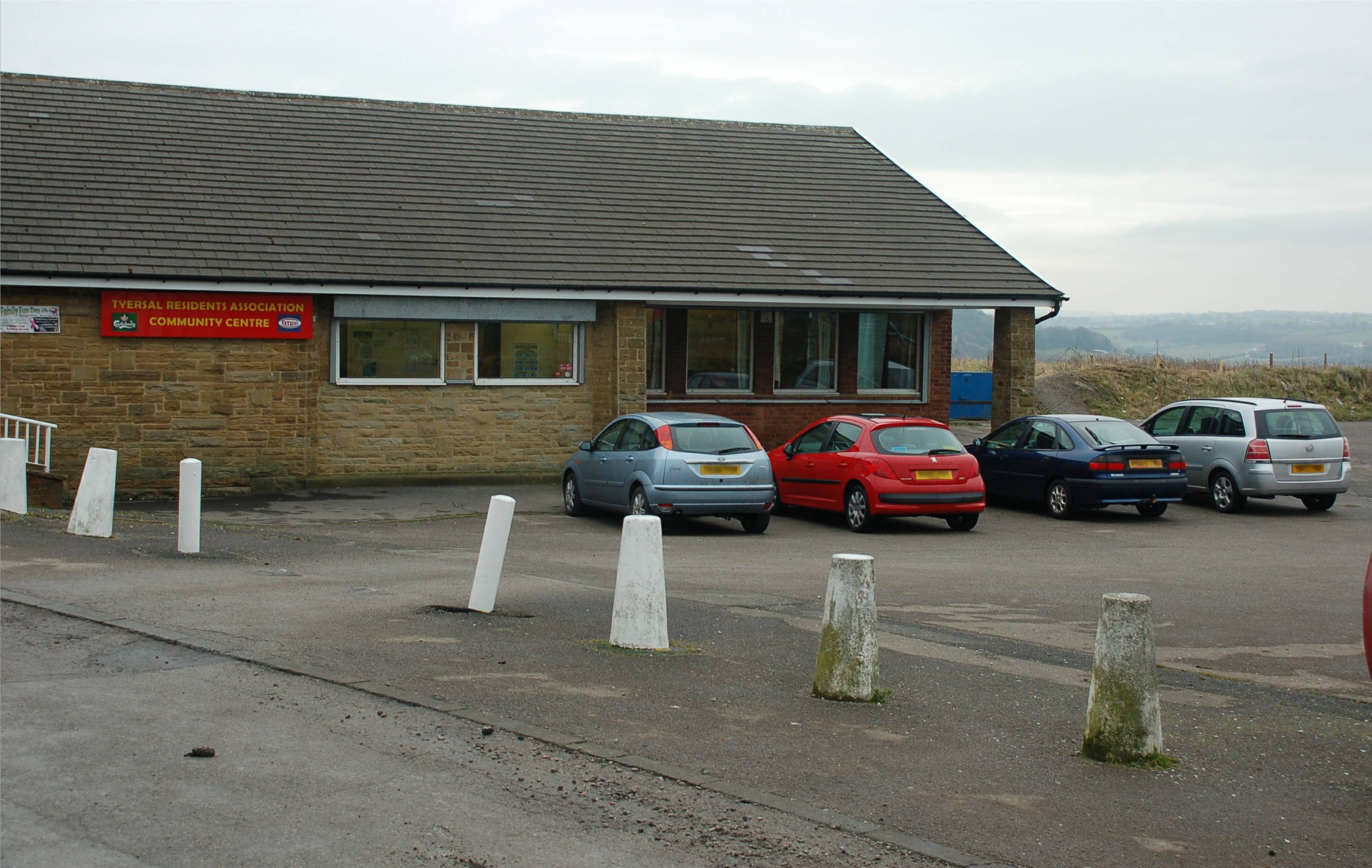
Tyersal Residents Association Community Centre

- Tyersal Residents Association Community Centre
- Tyersal Park Bowling Club

The Crown Green bowling club plays in the Bradford Crown Green Bowling Association.

== See also ==
- Listed buildings in Pudsey
