= James Kinsella (mayor) =

American politician and lawyer

56th Mayor of Hartford, Connecticut
- In office 1957–1960
- Preceded by: Joseph V. Cronin
- Succeeded by: Dominick J. DeLucco

Personal details
- Born: James Hall Kinsella; July 12, 1924; Hartford, Connecticut, U.S.
- Died: October 8, 2012 (aged 88); Hartford, Connecticut, U.S.
- Education: Trinity College (BA); University of Nebraska (LLB)

Military service
- Branch/service: United States Marine Corps
- Battles/wars: World War II

James Hall Kinsella (July 12, 1924 – October 8, 2012) was an American attorney, politician, and jurist who served as the mayor of Hartford, Connecticut from 1957 to 1960.

== Early life and education ==
Kinsella was born to George F. Kinsella and Dorothea (née Mooney) Kinsella on July 12, 1924. His grandfather, Richard J. Kinsella, had previously served as Mayor of Hartford from 1918 to 1920 and from 1922 to 1924. His father, George F. Kinsella, had served as Hartford's city assessor. James Kinsella's brother, George B. Kinsella, later became Hartford's mayor for one term from 1965 to 1967.

Kinsella served in the United States Marine Corps, achieving the rank of sergeant, during World War II. He received a bachelor's degree from Trinity College in 1947 and a law degree from University of Nebraska College of Law in 1952. he returned to Hartford and passed the Connecticut state bar exam.

== Career ==
He practiced at a private law firm prior to entering local politics. In 1953, Kinsella was elected to the Hartford City Council when he was 29 years old. The city council also elected him Deputy Mayor, a position he held until he became Mayor of Hartford in 1957. Kinsella was elected mayor and sworn into office in 1957. He was re-elected to a second term in 1959 and served until late 1960.

Kinsella left the mayor's office in 1960 when he was elected a Hartford probate judge (Judge of Probate for the District of Hartford). He remained a probate judge in 1984. That same year, Kinsella retired from the bench as he was facing possible impeachment over the handling of the estate of Ethel Frances Donaghue, a wealthy former lawyer from neighboring West Hartford, Connecticut. He was never impeached.

Kinsella, who remained a working attorney until late in life, continued to pursue philanthropic endeavors for Hartford after leaving the court. He supported beautification efforts, including the construction of a city park and jogging track at Broad Street and Farmington Avenue in Hartford. He purchased police horses for the Hartford Police Department and lighting for Hartford City Hall. Kinsella also created scholarships, acquired a piano for the Hartford library, and installed a notable rose window at the Charter Oak Cultural Center.

== Personal life ==
Kinsella died at his home in Hartford on October 8, 2012, at the age of 88.
