= Rockledge Gardens =

Garden center and nursery in Florida, US

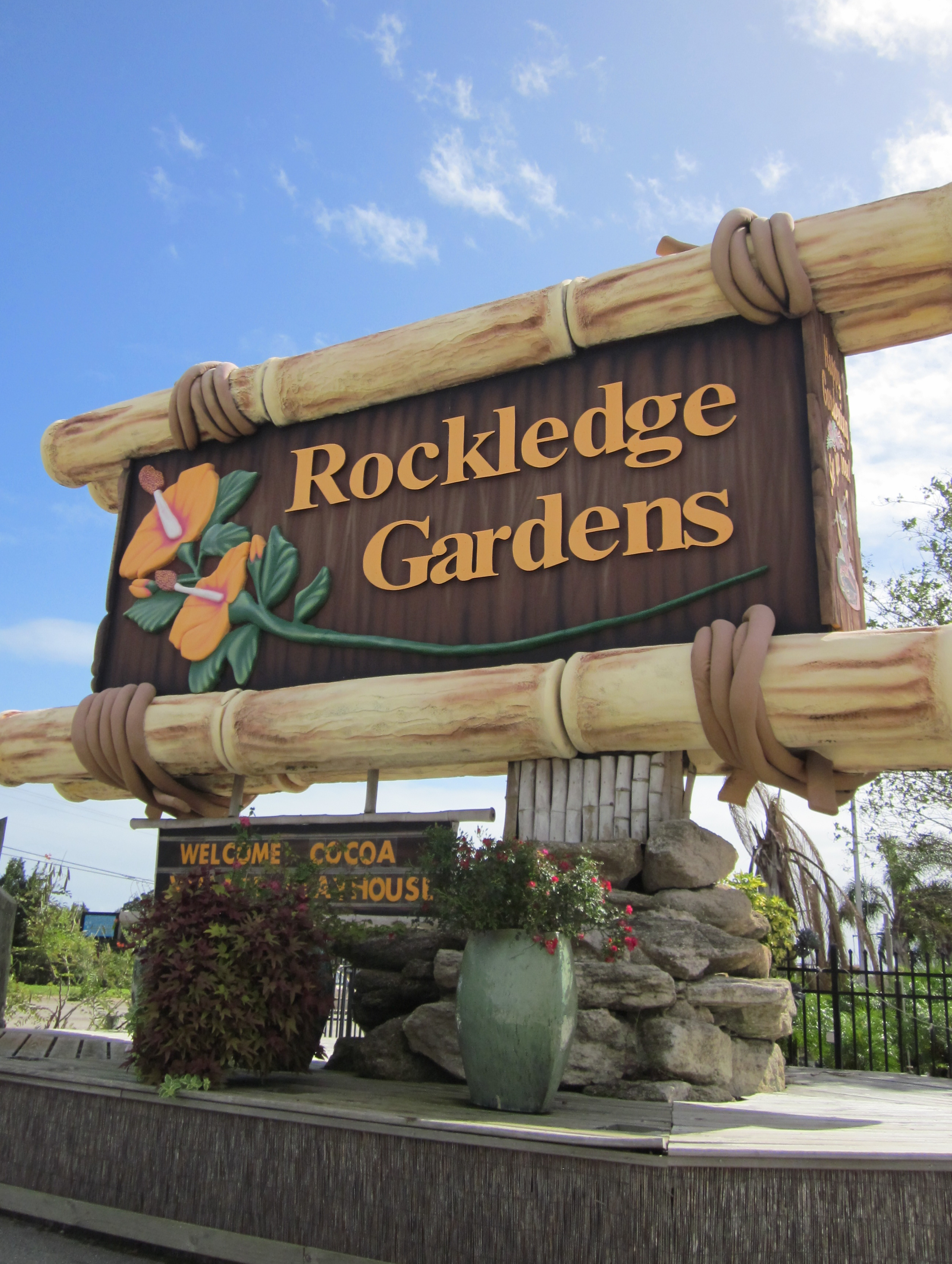

Rockledge Gardens is located in Rockledge, Florida, which is in the Space Coast region. Rockledge Gardens is the oldest garden center and nursery in Brevard County, Florida.

== History ==
Rockledge Gardens was founded in 1962 by Harry Witte. Witte was born in Cincinnati, Ohio and moved to Brevard County, Florida in 1948. Witte ran a flower bulb business and expanded it into a nursery and landscape business as the area's population grew in the early 1960s, due to the space program at nearby Kennedy Space Center. Witte died in 1998 at the age of 87. In his obituary, Florida Today called him a “pioneer in the Brevard County environmentalism and beautification movement.” Witte and his wife Mary had six children, who took turns working in the family business. Today, Mary Witte is still actively involved in Rockledge Gardens, and the business is owned and operated by the Witte’s youngest daughter and her husband, Theresa and Kevin Riley.

== Information ==
The 5 acre garden center includes a greenhouse containing indoor and shade plants, orchids, bromeliads, and succulents. The outdoor area features tropical and hardy trees, shrubs, annuals and perennials. There are also gardens which demonstrate home landscape ideas. A screened-in butterfly garden has a memorial to Harry Witte. Staffed information kiosks are a place for customers to get help and advice with plants and plant care. The Little Bugs Club, a monthly gardening program for 4-12 year olds, is led by Theresa and Kevin Witte’s daughter, Aurelia. Rockledge Gardens also includes an 8-acre area across the highway from the retail space, where bamboo, palms and trees are grown for sale.

== Gallery ==
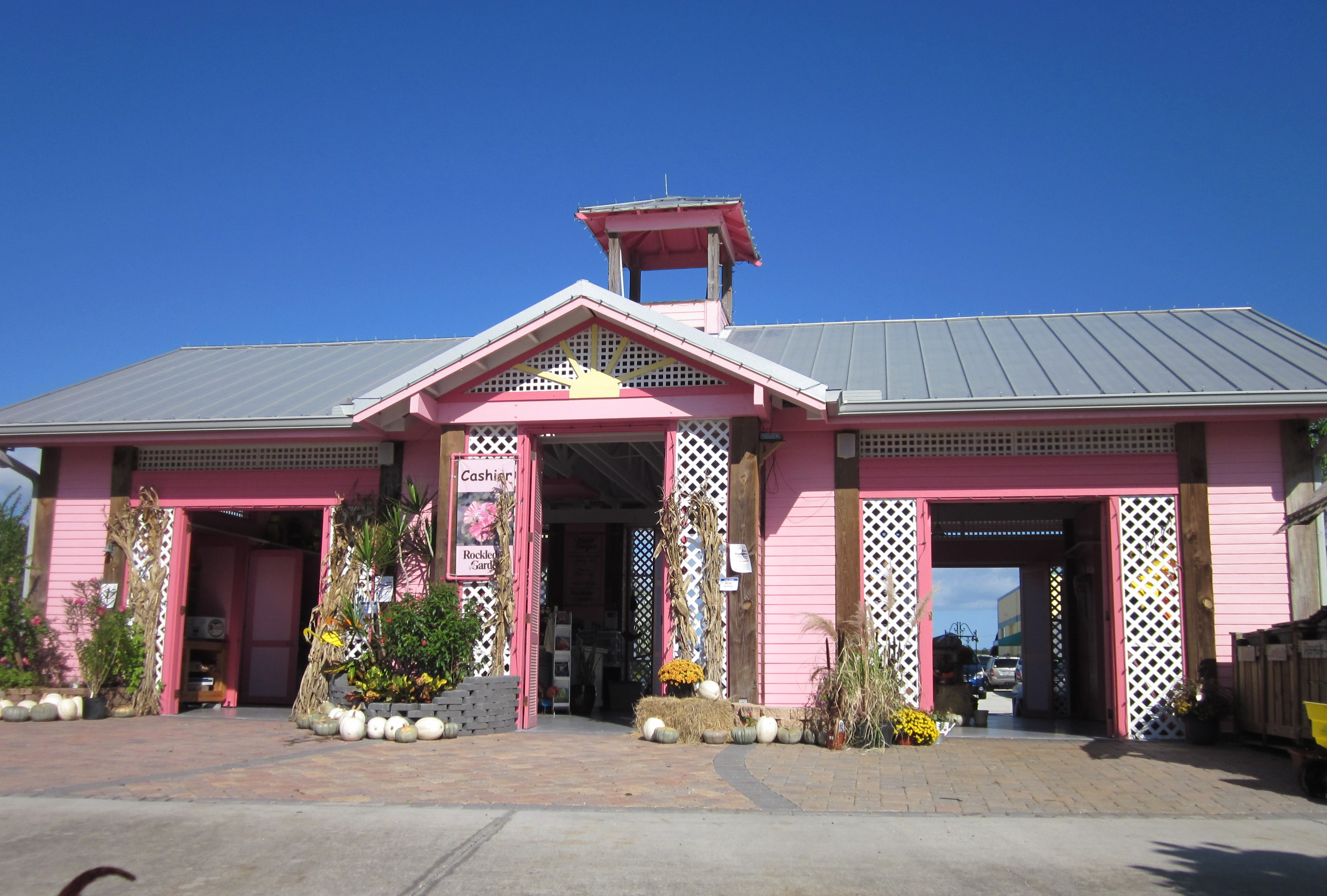
Rockledge Gardens shop and entrance

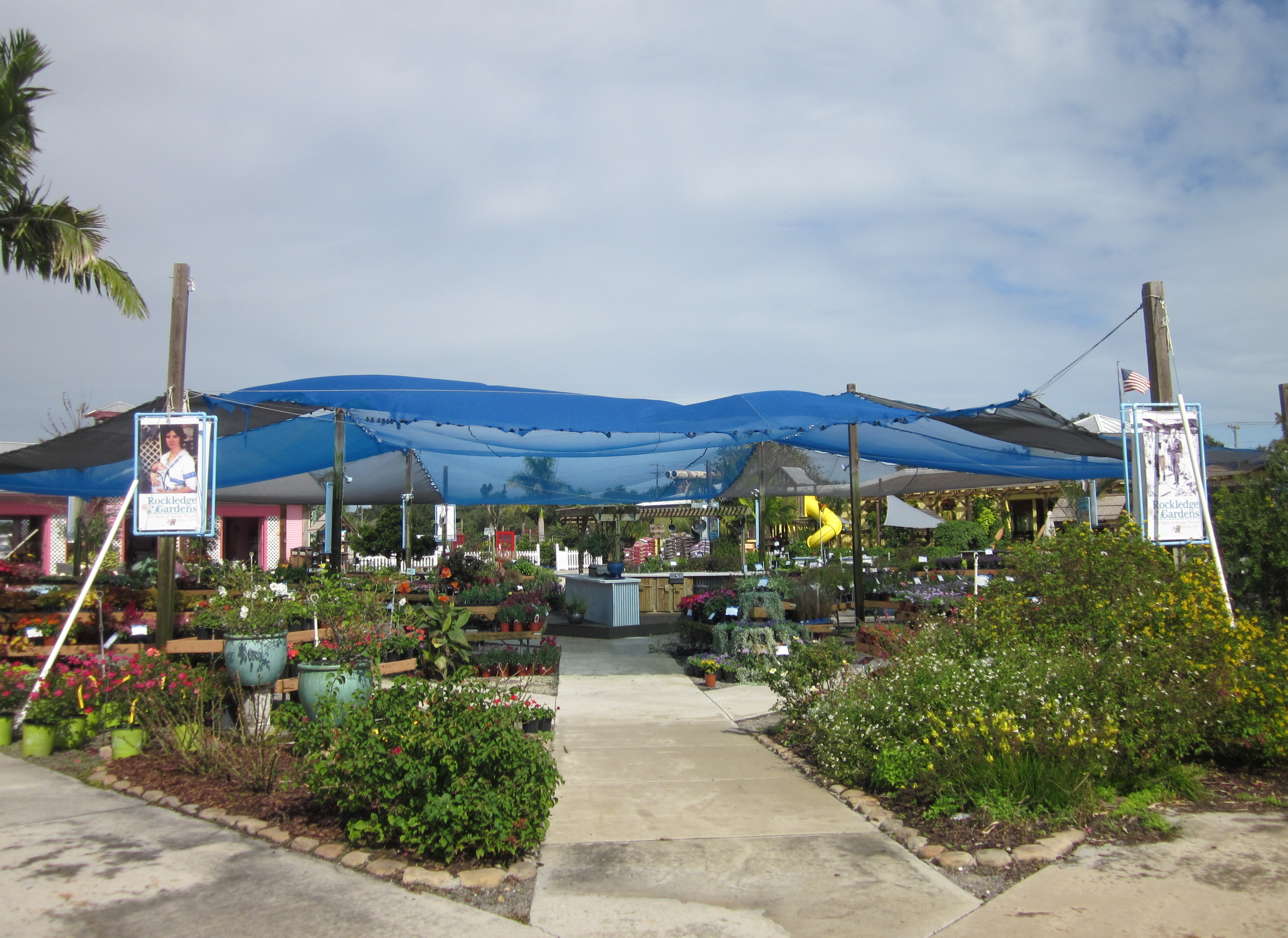
Seasonal plants and flowers at Rockledge Gardens

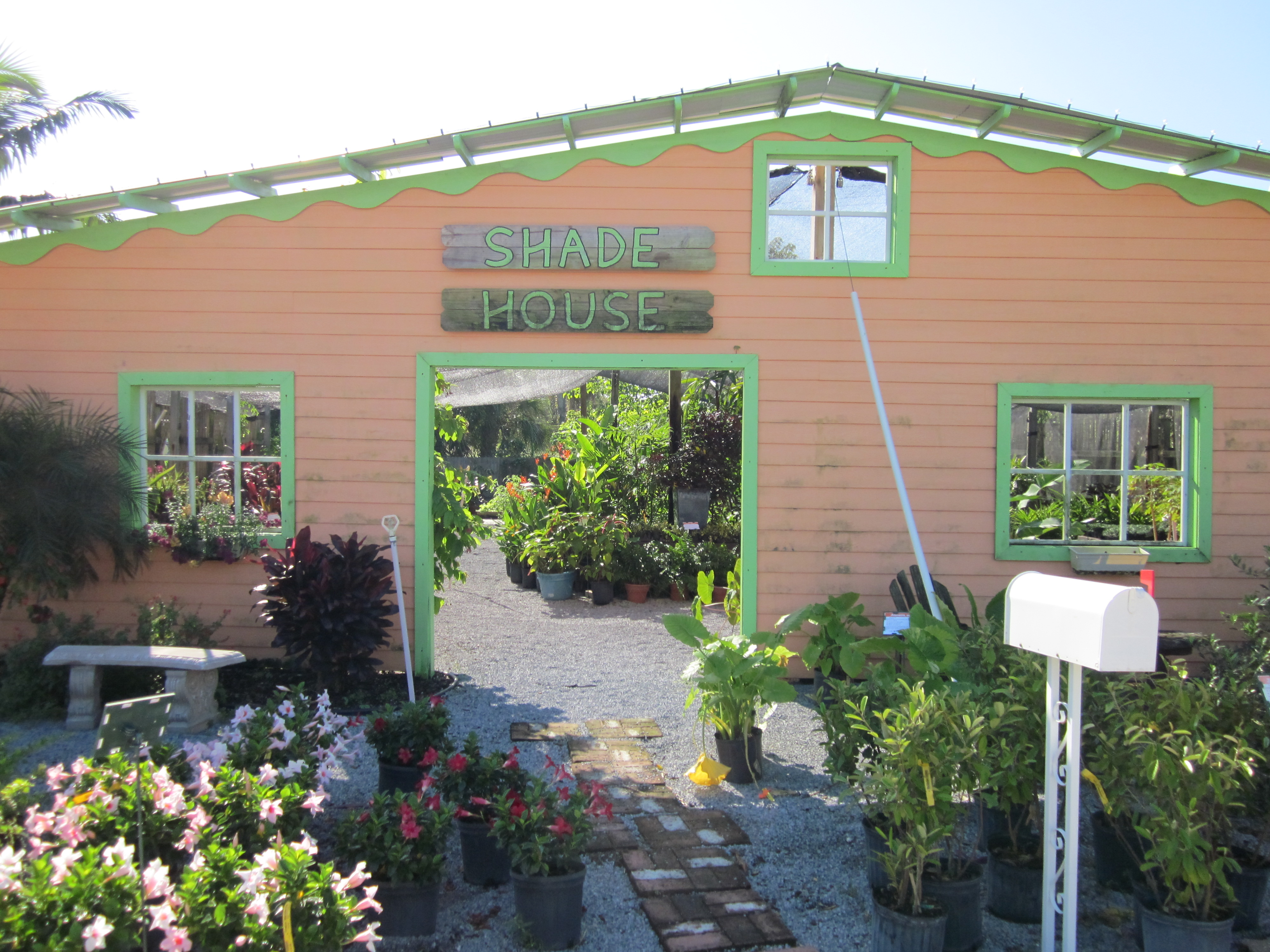
Shade House at Rockledge Gardens

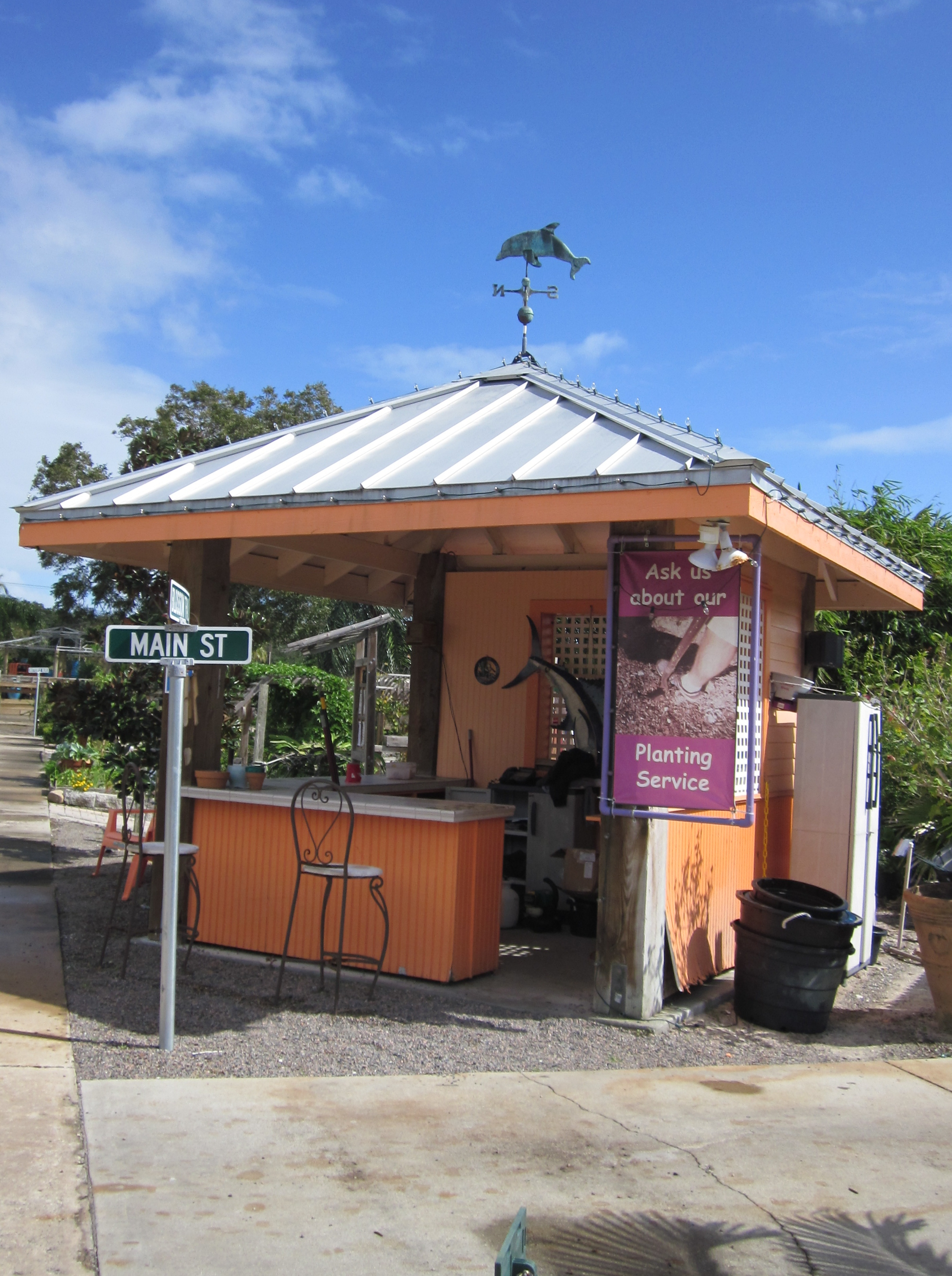
Rockledge Gardens Information Kiosk

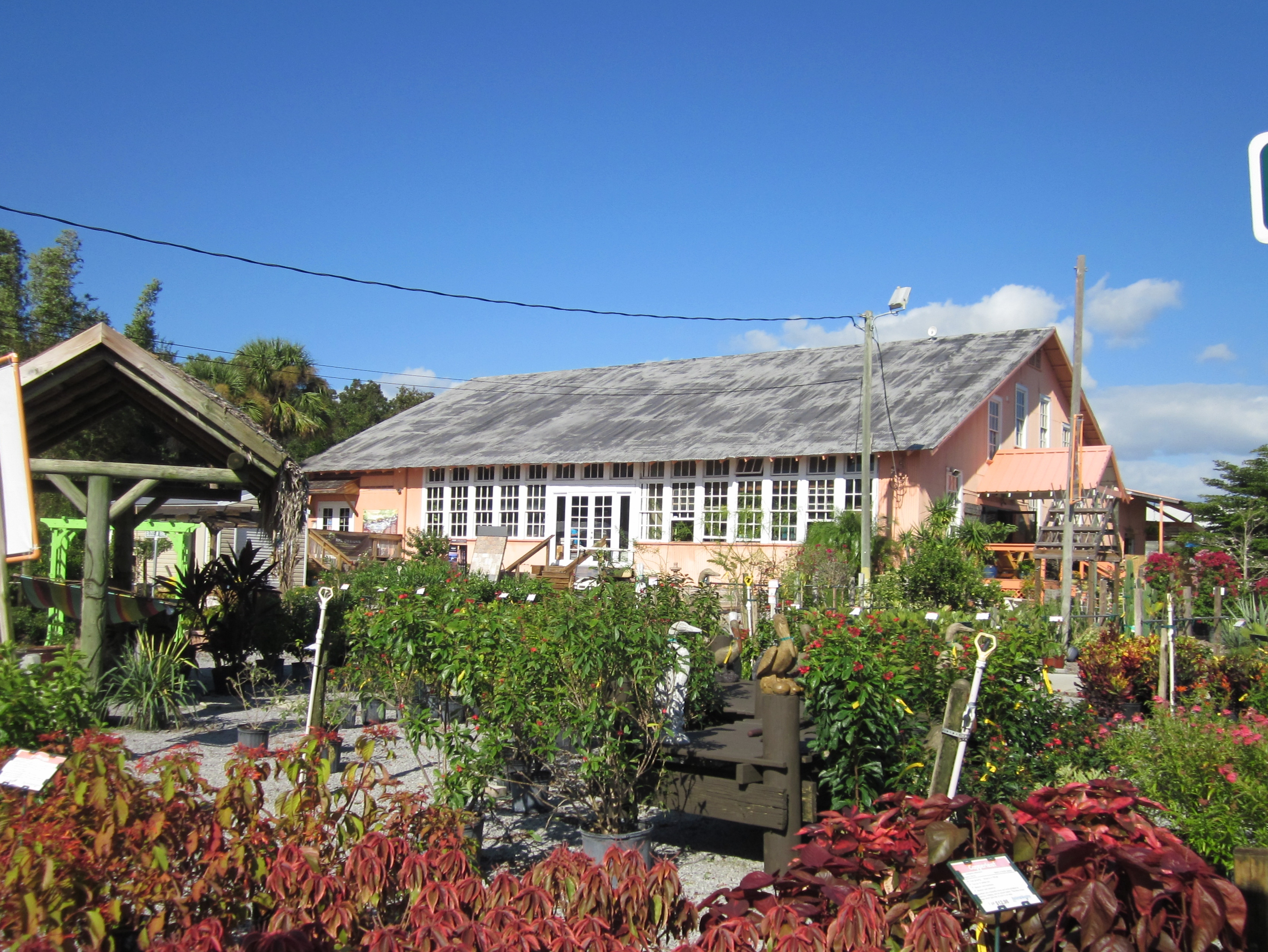
Outdoor plants and building with home accent items

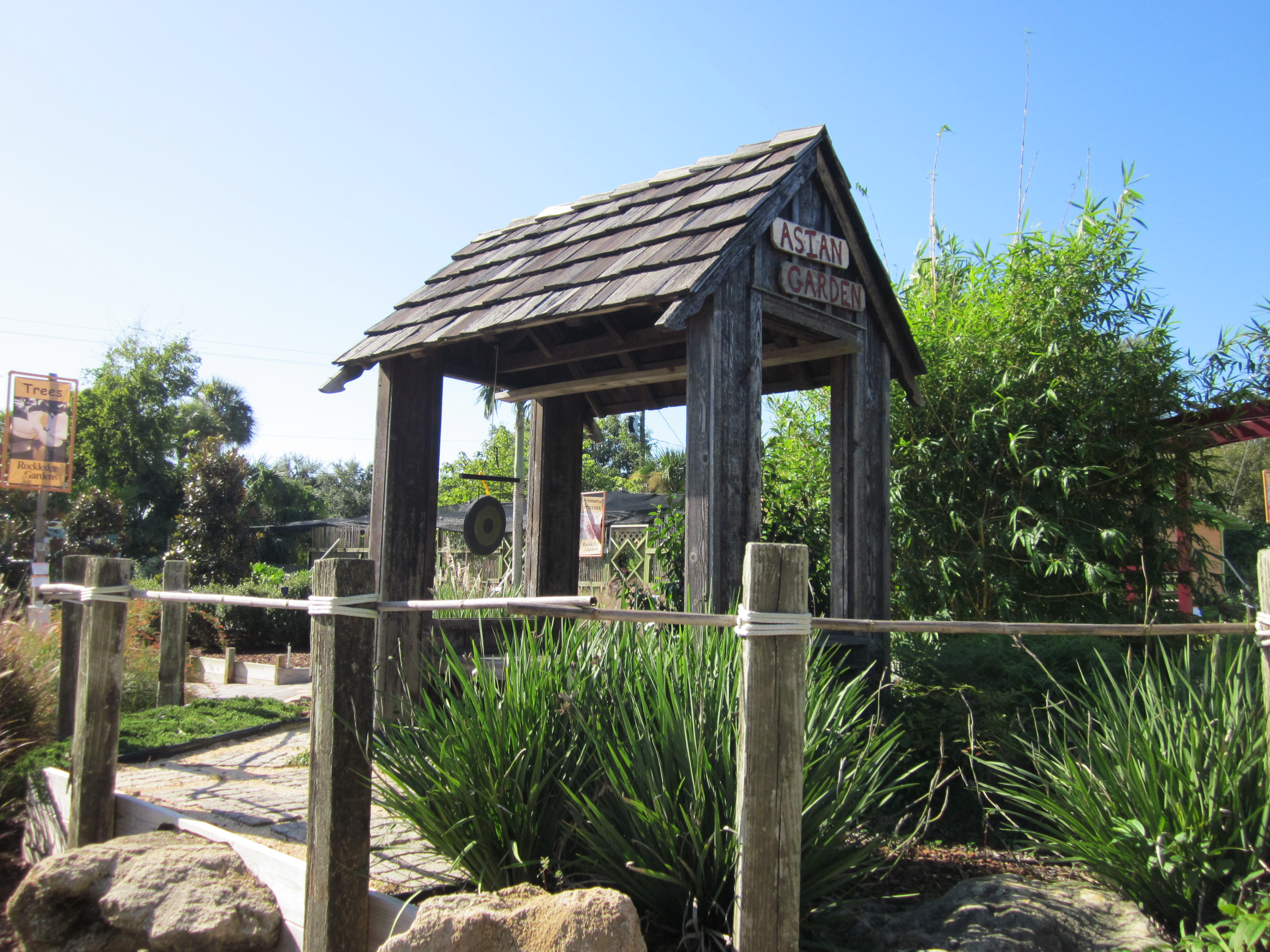
Asian Garden at Rockledge Gardens
