= Beckfoot Oakbank =

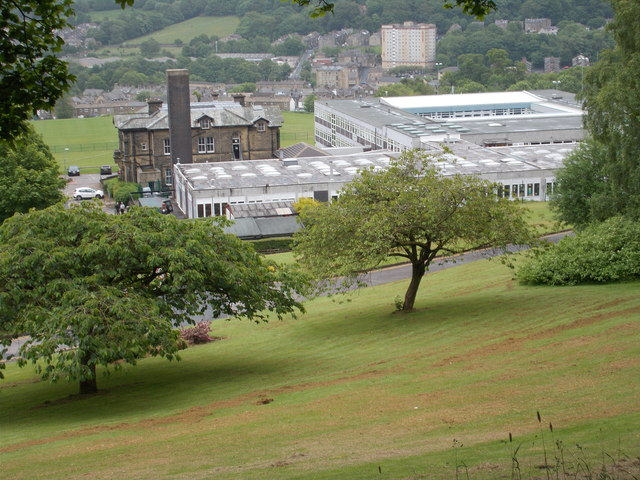

Location
- Oakworth Road; Keighley, West Yorkshire, BD22 7DU; England; 53.854506°N 1.926825°W

Information
- Type: Academy
- Established: 1871; 155 years ago as Keighley Trade and Grammar School
- Local authority: City of Bradford
- Trust: Beckfoot Trust
- Department for Education URN: 143112 Tables
- Ofsted: Reports
- Executive Headteacher: Andrew Burton
- Staff: 200
- Gender: Mixed
- Age: 11 to 18
- Enrolment: 1,597 pupils
- Website: https://www.beckfootoakbank.org/

Beckfoot Oakbank is a mixed secondary school and sixth form located in Keighley, West Yorkshire, England. It is situated near Ingrow Lane on Oakworth Road (B6143) in the west of Keighley.

== History ==
=== Grammar school ===
Oakbank was founded from the Drake and Tonson School as Keighley Trade and Grammar School (KT & GS) in 1871. It became Keighley Boys' Grammar School (KBGS) on Alice Street at an unidentified date after 1922. A 1916 newspaper article calls it KT & GS and in 1922 pupil Harry Whitaker from Cowling was awarded a gold medal marked “KT & GS Junior Champion 1922”

Following a fire in 1962 in the Mechanics' Institute (which also provided the school with its assembly hall and some classrooms) new buildings were built in 1964. Parents and staff over a 4-year period also raised £25,000 for the original swimming pool, now built over. On its move it became firstly and rather confusingly Keighley School for a few years despite still being a grammar, then in 1968 became Oakbank Grammar School with new uniform and oak leaf badge, when administered under Keighley Committee for Education. It is perhaps ironic that the name change to Oakbank Grammar coincided with its change to comprehensive status. Sixth form retained the green blazers with white stripes at this time, and a "third year sixth" was offered for Oxford and Cambridge candidates to prepare.

=== Comprehensive ===
It became a co-educational school in 1967 with one year's intake of sixth form girls, then the following year in 1968 a comprehensive school for ages 14 to 18, under the new name Oakbank Grammar School. The move from a boys' grammar school was phased over a few years with new co-ed comprehensive intakes in what was then known as the Fourth Form. It changed its name to Oakbank School in 1990. During the same period of time the school, with pupils aged 13 to 19, moved to its current site from Bronte Upper School. In 2000 it became a secondary school for 11- to 19-year-olds through a re-organisation of British schools.

It became a Sports College in 1997, and gained Technology College accreditation in 2004.

The school was visited by former Minister for Sport, Gerry Sutcliffe.

=== Academy ===
Previously a foundation school administered by City of Bradford Metropolitan District Council, in September 2016 Oakbank School converted to academy status and was renamed Beckfoot Oakbank. The school is now sponsored by the Beckfoot Trust.

== Curriculum ==
The school has been graded as satisfactory or better in all areas of the curriculum in its last two Ofsted inspections. Around 52% of pupils achieved five A* to C grade passes at GCSE in 2008.

== Sixth form and Cove ==
Oakbank pupils have the choice of staying on to sixth form for further study and to gain further qualifications. In 2003 the new six form block opened, facilitating a higher number of pupils. In 2004 the Cove Centre of Vocational Excellence building was opened to provide more space

== Notable former pupils ==
- John Cryer - Labour MP from 1997 to 2005 for Hornchurch
- Paul Hudson – BBC weather forecaster
- Tommy Lee – footballer with Chesterfield F.C.
- Jodie Underhill - founder of Waste Warriors in India

=== Keighley Boys' Grammar School ===
- Herbert Barritt, cricketer and educator
- Asa Binns, civil engineer
- Gordon Bottomley, poet
- Asa Briggs, Baron Briggs, Chancellor of the Open University 1978–94, Vice-Chancellor 1967–76 of the University of Sussex. and Professor of History 1961–76
- Sir Herbert Butterfield, Vice Chancellor of the University of Cambridge 1959–61 and Master of Peterhouse, Cambridge 1955–68, Professor of Modern History 1944–63 at the University of Cambridge and President 1955–58 of the Historical Association
- Sir Wilfred Cockcroft, mathematician, Vice-Chancellor 1976–82 of the New University of Ulster, Chief Executive 1983–88 of the Secondary Exams Council, and President since 1992 of the British Accreditation Council
- John Hatch, Baron Hatch of Lusby
- Sir Trevor Holdsworth, Chairman of GKN 1980–88 and of National Power 1990–95, and Chancellor 1992–97 of the University of Bradford
- David Jeanes, rugby league player
- John Moffatt, Provost 1987–93 of the Queen's College, Oxford
- Captain Sir Tom Moore, British Army officer, and fundraiser for the NHS during the COVID-19 pandemic.
- Don Mosey, sports journalist and cricket commentator for Test Match Special
- Peter Roe, rugby league player and coach
- Sir Bracewell Smith, Conservative MP 1932–45 for Dulwich
- Leonard James Spencer, geologist and President 1936–39 of the Mineralogical Society

=== Notable former staff ===
- Robert Westall, children's author (taught art at boys' grammar 1958–60)
