= Betty Lockwood, Baroness Lockwood =

British political activist (1924–2019)

The Right Honourable The Baroness Lockwood
- Lockwood in the Lords chamber, 2008

4th Chancellor of the University of Bradford
- In office March 1997 – 7 December 2005
- Preceded by: Trevor Holdsworth
- Succeeded by: Imran Khan

Member of the House of Lords
- Lord Temporal
- Life peerage 27 February 1978 – 18 May 2017

Personal details
- Born: 22 January 1924 Dewsbury, West Yorkshire, England
- Died: 29 April 2019 (aged 95)
- Education: Ruskin College

Betty Lockwood, Baroness Lockwood (22 January 1924 – 29 April 2019) was a Labour Party activist. She was heavily involved in promoting equal opportunities for women on a national and international level.

== Biography ==
Born in Dewsbury, West Yorkshire, the daughter of Arthur Lockwood, a coal miner, Betty Lockwood followed an unconventional route into politics. She left Eastborough Girls School at 14, then continued her studies at night school. With the support of a Mary Macarthur scholarship for working women, she read economics and politics at Ruskin College in Oxford.

After attending university she became active in the Labour Party as regional women's organiser for Yorkshire, then moved to London as women's officer. She campaigned for equal pay and was instrumental in the creation of the Equal Pay Act 1970.

From 1975–83 she served as the first chair of the Equal Opportunities Commission and was chair of the European Advisory Committee on Equal Opportunities for Women and Men (1982–83). On 27 February 1978 she was elevated to a life peerage as Baroness Lockwood, of Dewsbury in the County of West Yorkshire. She sat in the House of Lords until her retirement on 18 May 2017.

Lockwood died on 29 April 2019.

== Affiliations ==
Her connections with the University of Bradford date back to 1983, when she became a member of its council and she served as Chancellor of the university from 1997, being succeeded in 2005 by the former Pakistan international cricketer and politician Imran Khan.

From 1983 to 1989, Lockwood was president of Birkbeck College, London, a university college specialising in part-time adult higher education.

She was chair of the National Coal Mining Museum for England. She received four honorary doctorates and was President of the Yorkshire Arthritis Research Campaign. She was also a member of Soroptimist International, a group working to advance the status of women and was a patron of the Born in Bradford research project. She listed her hobbies as enjoying the Yorkshire Dales and opera.

== Family ==
She married Lieutenant-Colonel Cedric Hall in 1978. He died in 1988.

Party political offices
Preceded by Constance Kay	National Women's Officer of the Labour Party; 1967–1975	Succeeded by Joyce Gould
Government offices
Preceded by New position	Chair of the Equal Opportunities Commission; 1975–1983	Succeeded by Beryl Platt
Academic offices
Preceded by Trevor Holdsworth	Chancellor of the University of Bradford; 1997–2005	Succeeded by Imran Khan
