= Edward A. Richardson =

American environmentalist (1924–2019)

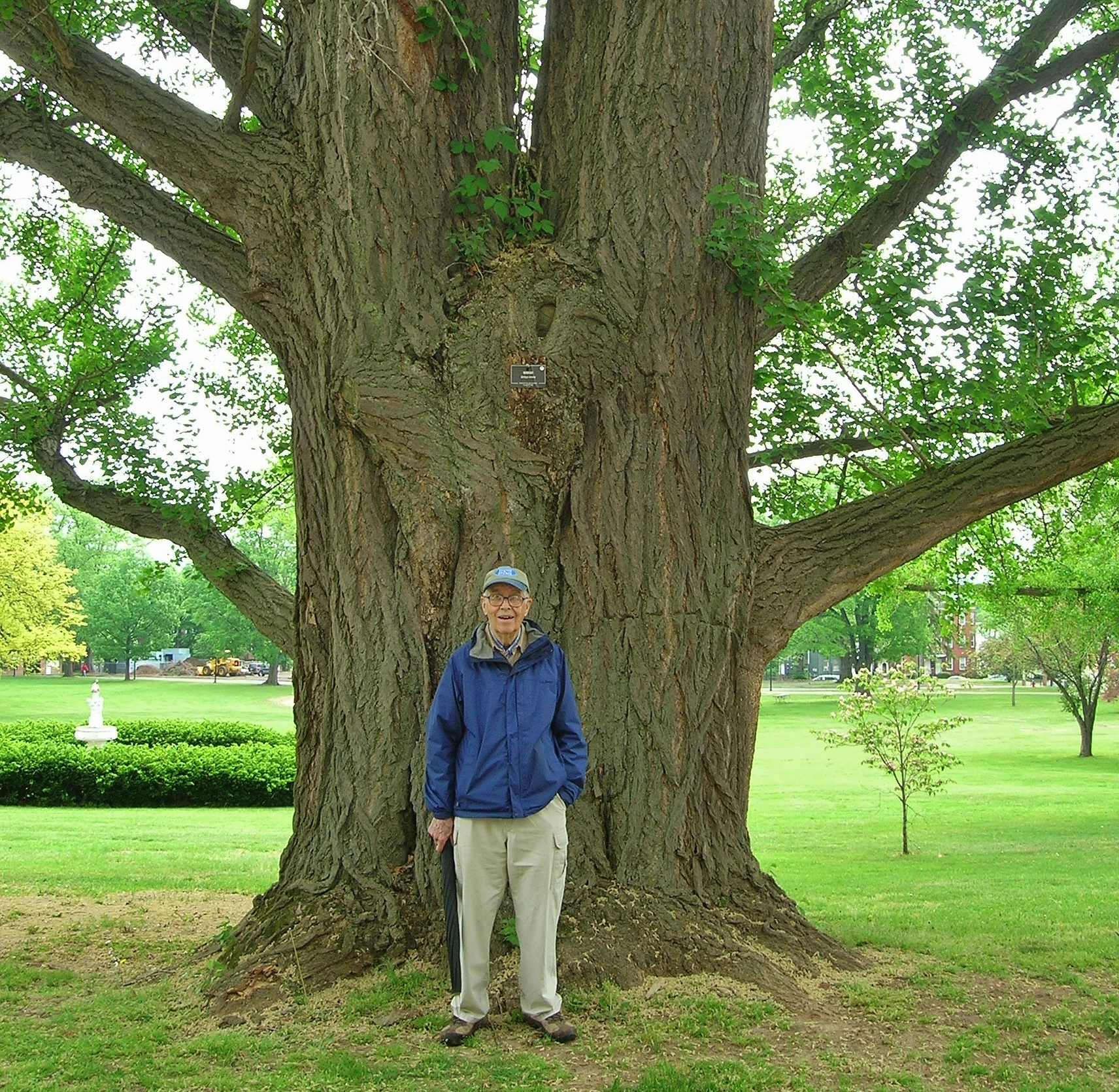
Ed Richardson with Connecticut Champion Ginkgo, on the campus of The Institute of Living in Hartford, Connecticut (May 2015).

Edward A. Richardson (July 10, 1924 – December 19, 2019) was a self-taught tree expert who spent years studying the trees of Connecticut. Richardson, a World War II veteran who made his living in Connecticut's insurance industry, volunteered numerous hours of his time to find, measure and catalog large and interesting trees for the Notable Tree Survey of the Connecticut Botanical Society, which resulted in the publication of Glenn Dreyer's book, Connecticut's Notable Trees, in 1989. Richardson mapped out the trees in Hartford's Bushnell Park, Institute of Living, Elizabeth Park and Cedar Hill Cemetery. Over the years, Richardson also led numerous tree tours throughout the state of Connecticut.

On November 15, 2018, the Connecticut Forest and Park Association presented Richardson with an Official Statement issued by Governor Dannel Malloy, honoring Richardson's years of service to the trees of Connecticut.

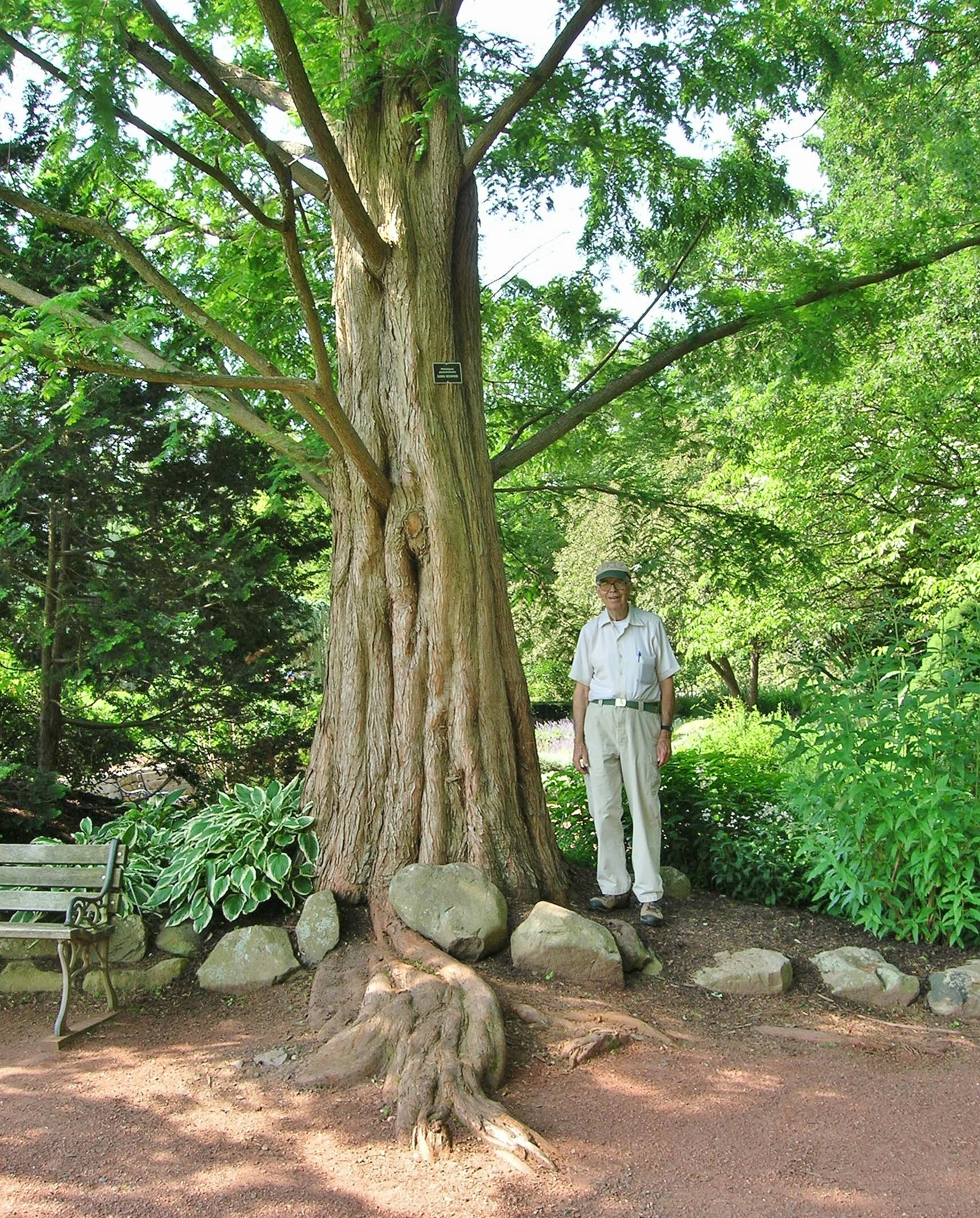
Ed Richardson in Elizabeth Park, West Hartford, Connecticut (June 2013).
