= Ice Glen =

Ravine in the southeast area of Stockbridge, Massachusetts

Coordinates: 42.27289°N 73.30645°W

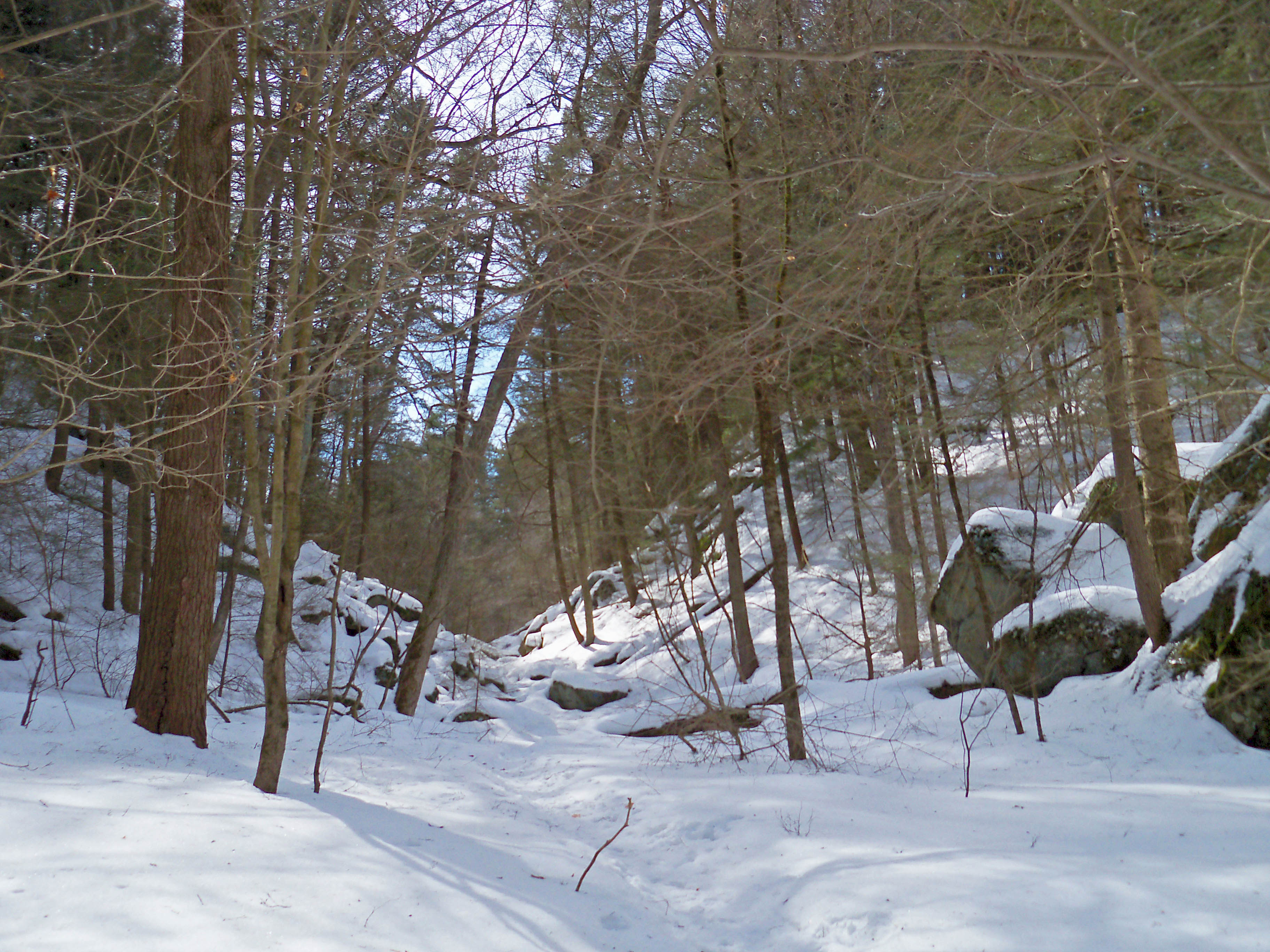
Northern entrance to the Ice Glen, 13 March 2015.

The Ice Glen is a ravine in the southeast area of Stockbridge, Massachusetts. The park is essentially a lush, untended, romantic landscape consisting of piled rocks thick with mosses. Ice Glen derives its name from the fact that ice can persist at the bottom of deep rock crevices there into the summer. Its north-south orientation protects the glen from much direct sunlight. Surrounding the glen is an old growth forest, rare in New England.

In 1891, the Ice Glen was donated by David Dudley Field to the Laurel Hill Association, the first incorporated village improvement society in the United States. As the association's existing property at Laurel Hill, which directly abuts the village center of Stockbridge, is separated from the forested hills in which the Ice Glen is located by the Housatonic River, the association built a bridge to connect the two properties. A trail still runs from Laurel Hill, behind the former Stockbridge Plain School, now the Town Offices building, over the bridge, through the glen, and exits on Ice Glen Road behind Villa Virginia.

Beginning in the late nineteenth century, annual torchlight parades through the glen became popular.

== Appearances in literature ==
In chapter 102 of Moby-Dick the narrator invokes the “Icy Glen” as the apotheosis of verdant nature run wild:

It was a wondrous sight. The wood was green as mosses of the Icy Glen; the trees stood high and haughty, feeling their living sap; the industrious earth beneath was as a weaver’s loom …

Melville was living in nearby Pittsfield when he wrote the novel and is known to have visited the Ice Glen on at least one occasion. As Katharine Mixer Abbott wrote,

If Ice-Glen and Laurel Hill had kept a sentimental guest-book, then ingenious visitors might have left us a legacy of individual impressions of this most curious fissure in all Berkshire, lying concealed between Bear and Little Mountain. Veritable moss castles of gnomes and elves seem the tumbled boulders in the twilight of the gorge: all too sunless here for lovers’ tryst— not even golden Queen Summer succeeds in erasing the chill of his majesty the Frost-King’s footsteps, yet by her commands beautiful fern-clusters line the yawning black rock caverns.
