= All Ladies League =

International women's organization

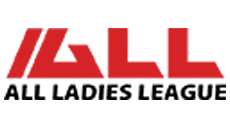
ALL Ladies League (ALL), a non-profit organization, is one of the apex international Women's Chamber operating from India.

ALL Ladies League (ALL) is an international women's chamber for the welfare and empowering of women's leadership. The organization was founded in 2015 by Harbeen Arora. It has a forum arm named the Women Economic Forum (WEF), to encourage peer exchange and community spirit. ALL and WEF are headquartered in India.

== Activities ==
ALL confers awards. Distinguished people who have received the Women of the Decade awards include Sania Mirza, Saina Nehwal, Supriya Sule, Chanda Kocchar, Naina Lal Kidwai, Shobhana Bhartia, Sharmila Tagore, Ritu Kumar, Somdutta Singh, Sangeeta Reddy, Jodie Underhill and others. It has also conferred Grassroots Women of the Decade awards to recognize and felicitate rural women leaders in different spheres.
