= John Hatch, Baron Hatch of Lusby =

John Charles Hatch, Baron Hatch of Lusby (1 November 1917 – 11 October 1992) was a British author, broadcaster, lecturer and Labour Party politician.

Hatch was born in Stockport, Lancashire but moved to Yorkshire at an early age. He attended Keighley Boys' Grammar School and Sidney Sussex College, Cambridge. He subsequently became a tutor in Labour colleges and a lecturer at the University of Glasgow.

Between 1950 and 1970 he served as Commonwealth correspondent for the New Statesman, and developed a lifelong interest in African affairs, serving as a policy adviser to leaders such as Julius Nyerere and Kenneth Kaunda amongst others. He was Commonwealth Secretary of the Labour Party during the 1950s, before becoming Director of the Extra-Mural Department of the University of Sierra Leone in 1961.

He was made a life peer on 5 May 1978 as Baron Hatch of Lusby of Oldfield in the County of West Yorkshire.

He was the second husband of Turkish-born photographer Eva Grant.

== Publications ==
- Coal for the people; the mines for the miners... (1946)
- The Dilemma of South Africa (1952)
- The intelligent socialist's guide to Africa (1953)
- New from Africa (1956)
- Everyman's Africa (1959)
- Africa today-and tomorrow (1965)
- A History of Post-war Africa (1965)
- The History of Britain in Africa (1966)
- Africa - the rebirth of self-rule (1967)
- Nigeria: A history (1971)
- Tanzania: A profile (1972)
- Africa emergent: Africa's problems since independence (1974)
- Two African statesmen: Kaunda of Zambia and Nyerere of Tanzania (1976)
- Kaunda of Zambia (1980)
