= Elizabeth Park (Connecticut) =

Park in Connecticut, US

- U.S. National Register of Historic Places
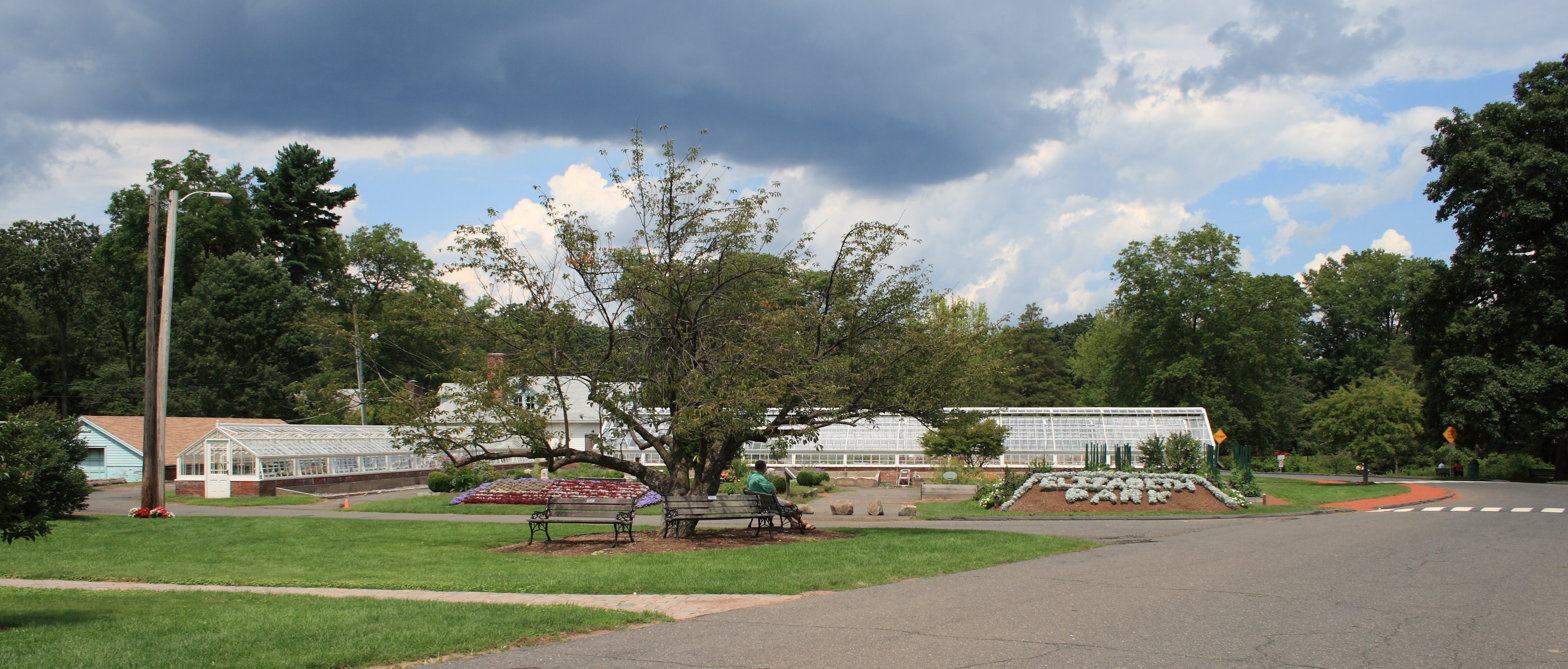
- The greenhouse and herb garden at Elizabeth Park
- Location: Asylum Avenue; West Hartford, Connecticut
- Coordinates: 41°46′34″N 72°43′08″W
- Area: 102 acres (41 ha)
- NRHP reference No.: 83001259
- Added to NRHP: March 10, 1983

Elizabeth Park is a city park located in Hartford and West Hartford, Connecticut. It covers 102 acres and is listed on the National Register of Historic Places. The park is owned by the City of Hartford, and jointly maintained by the City and the Elizabeth Park Conservancy. Located on land formerly owned by financier Charles M. Pond, it was taken over by the City of Hartford in 1897.

Today the park encompasses many garden areas, pathways, century-old Lord and Burnham greenhouses, lawns, bowling greens, tennis courts, a picnic grove, and a scenic pond. The border between Hartford and West Hartford has moved since the park was established, with the result that one of Hartford's largest parks is now located primarily within the Town of West Hartford. However the park is owned and maintained by the Conservancy and the City of Hartford Department of Public Works and Parks alone. The Elizabeth Park Conservancy has full management of the Helen S Kaman Rose Garden, and the seven other specialty gardens. The four greenhouses and garden head house are used to start plants from seeds and cutting, force bloom of tulips for the annual greenhouse show, and host exotic and tropical plants. The Conservancy holds garden, tree and history tours, garden workshops, greenhouse shows, and a summer concert series for the public.

== History ==
The site was previously owned by financier Charles M. Pond of the New York, New Haven & Hartford Railroad and Hartford National Bank, and a treasurer of Connecticut (1870–71). In 1894 he bequeathed his estate to the City of Hartford with the stipulation that it be named for his deceased wife, Elizabeth. The city took possession in 1897 and engaged the famed Frederick Law Olmsted for initial design and landscaping. In March 1896, the Hartford Board of Park Commissioners hired Swiss landscape architect, Theodore Wirth, as the first professional superintendent of parks for the City of Hartford.

In 1904, Mr. Wirth created the Rose Garden, which today covers 2.5 acres. It is the oldest municipal rose garden in the United States, currently containing about 15,000 bushes of 800 rose varieties. Today the Helen S Kaman Rose Garden, named after the first Conservancy president, has become one of the top tourist attractions in Connecticut.

In 1977, volunteers banded together with Vic Jarm (Park Superintendent at the time) to form the Friends of Elizabeth Park. Their first mission was to raise $10,000 and replace many of the rose bushes that died from lack of care. Since then, the Conservancy has assisted the City of Hartford in maintaining the Rose Garden as well as the other horticultural gardens in the park and have raised funds for the restoration of the historic greenhouses and the Elizabeth Pond Memorial in 1997, also known as the Pond House Café. Most of the financial support for the park comes from individuals, grants, and foundations such as the Ethel Donaghue Trust and the Kaman Foundation. In 2011, the name was changed to Elizabeth Park Conservancy to reflect their expanded mission and purpose beyond the rose garden.

== East Lawn ==
The East Lawn was designed by Theodore Wirth in 1896 and has been a communal space since the park opened in 1897. The Sunrise Overlook on the East Lawn offers views of the city's downtown area, with the area catching sunlight during early hours, earning the name Sunrise Overlook. A formal promenade and flower beds are placed on the highest point of East Lawn. Sunrise Overlook was redesigned in 1994 after the original design was neglected and overgrown. The promenade and flowerbeds were replaced by a semicircle of sitting walls, viewing terraces, and walkways. New trees were planted, alongside a variety of flowering shrubs, native plants, and perennials.

Under the vantage point of Sunrise Overlook, a vista of the city is placed, complete with bordering trees. Alongside the borders are over 20,000 shrubs and 275 trees. Over time, two baseball fields were added on the east side of the border, and a children's playground on the south border. There are also two basketball courts and a gravel path for visitors.

== Horticultural Gardens ==
The horticultural gardens in Elizabeth Park are collaborations with other organizations. The care and management of these gardens are the responsibility of whichever group planted them.

=== Herb Garden ===
A collaboration with the Connecticut Unit of the American Herb Society, the Herb Garden was planted in 1998 as a dedication to Anne Pinto, the former society president. The American Herb Society to promote the knowledge and use of herbs throughout communities, and this garden is used to push their mission by showing visitors to the park a variety of different herbs and their general information.

=== Dahlia Display Garden ===
A collaboration with the Connecticut Dahlia Society; the society holds an annual dahlia show every year, as well as a dahlia sale. The society uses their garden in the horticultural gardens of Elizabeth Park to promote their yearly events and attempt to get more people to participate in and spectate their shows.

=== Connecticut Iris Society Display Beds ===
A collaboration with the Connecticut Iris Society, these display beds hold several New England irises. The society also has a smaller set of display beds on the south side of the greenhouse, housing irises from Virginia. Most of these beds tend to bloom from April to June, with the garden being closed for the rest of the year. The society holds iris shows during peak growth season around May.

=== University of St. Joseph School of Pharmacy, Sara Knuth Medicine Garden ===
A collaboration with USJ School of Pharmacy, featuring a variety of medicinal plants around the world. These plants are frequently used in pharmaceuticals worldwide.

== Julian and Edith Eddy Rock Garden ==
The Julian and Edith Eddy Rock Garden features herbs, perennials, ornamental grasses, shrubs, and trees. First planted in 1915, the rock garden takes inspiration from earlier alpine gardens found in Austria. Most of the early plants did not acclimate well, and the garden went through three total restorations, with the final one being in 2016. In order to maintain the new garden, a combination of volunteers and park workers remove debris from the gardens and trim shrubs to promote new growth. The entire garden is surrounded by a border of deciduous trees.

== Heritage Rose Garden ==
The Heritage Rose Garden is a test garden planted by the All American Rose Selection, and contains a variety of roses including wild, Albas, Bourbons, and Hybrids amongst other species. The garden was renovated by the Connecticut Valley Garden Club in 2017, adding new variety's of international roses to the gardens. The garden itself is shaped like a rosette, with five distinctive districts shaped like petals. The garden remains as one of the few heritage rose gardens throughout the United States.

== Perennial Garden ==
The old Perennial Garden was one of the first gardens created in Elizabeth Park, under the direction of George Parker. The original garden fell into disrepair around the 1980s, with it undergoing renovations in 1987. After the renovations, over 1600 perennials were added to the garden, spread out over eight large flowerbeds. The beds are separated by "warm" and "cool" colors, directly opposite to one another to showcase the difference.

== Helen S Kaman Rose Garden ==
The Helen S Kaman Rose Garden is the first rose garden in the United States and the third largest rose garden in the country. Named after the park's first president, the garden opened in 1904 showcasing over 200 varieties of roses around the world. Since 1950, the garden has expanded to encompass over 1000 rose species. Every year, the park raises over $100,000 USD with the sole dedication to the rose garden. The shape of the rose garden is the same as the logo of the park; a square shape with a circle in the centre and 8 pathways leading from the circle to the square. Over time, a semicircular segment was added to the north and south sides of the garden, to accommodate more visitors and showcase more roses.

The following contains a partial list of some of the main rose species growing in the Helen S Kaman Rose Garden:

- Euonymus japonicus
- Rosa chinensis
- Portlandia grandiflora
- Rosa rugosa
- Rosa hybrida
- Rosa persica
- Rosa acicularis

== Image gallery ==
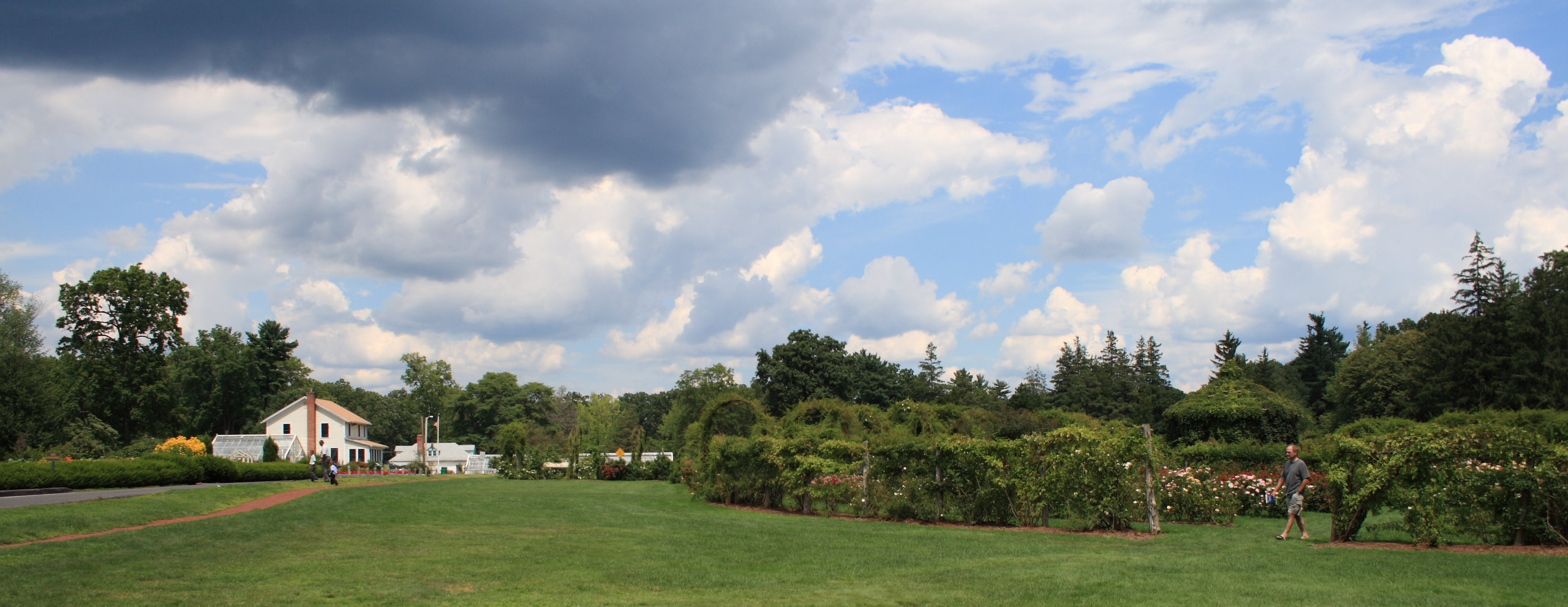
The Rose Garden, with the greenhouse in the background

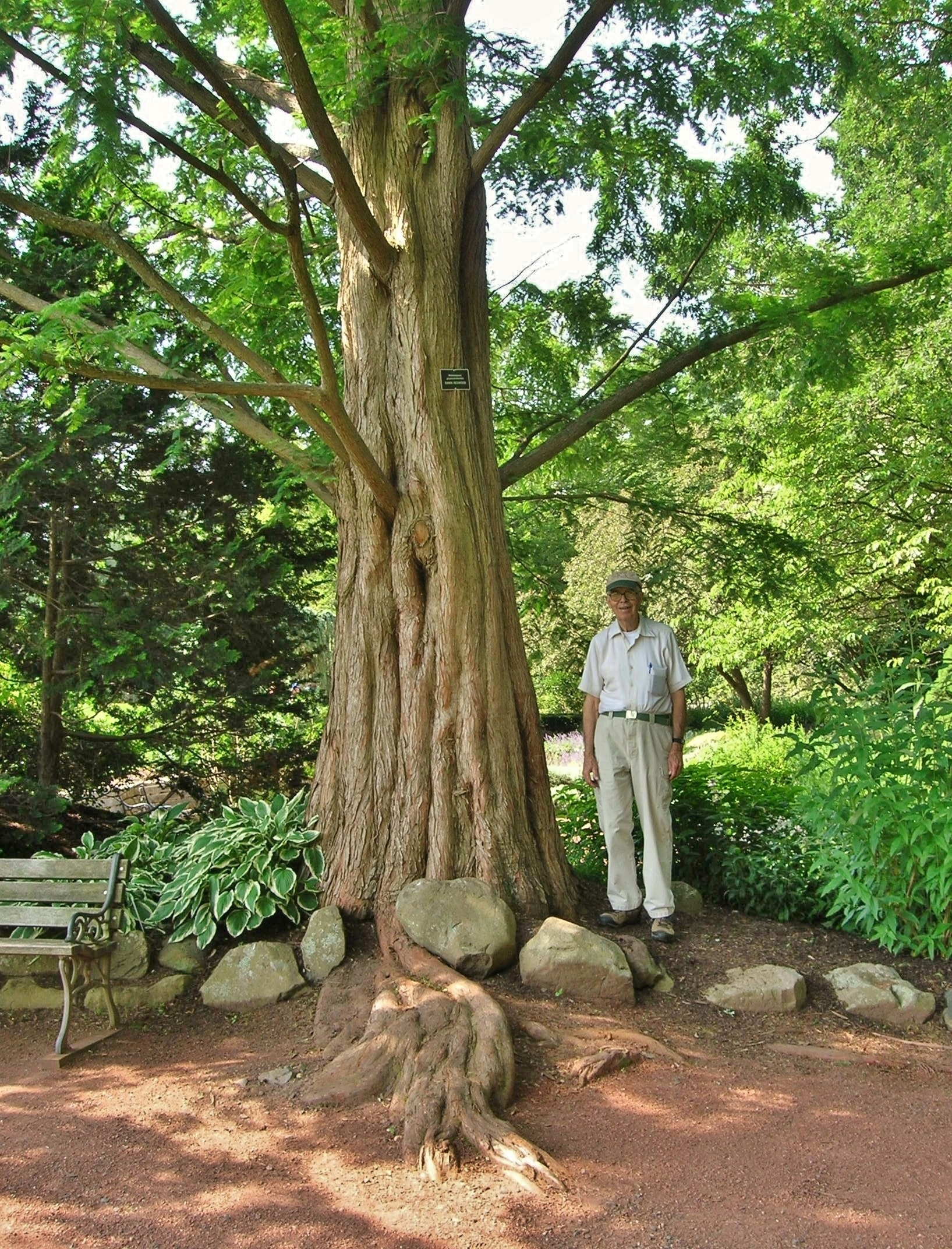
Dawn Redwood, June 2013 Pictured: Ed Richardson, who mapped the trees in Elizabeth Park.

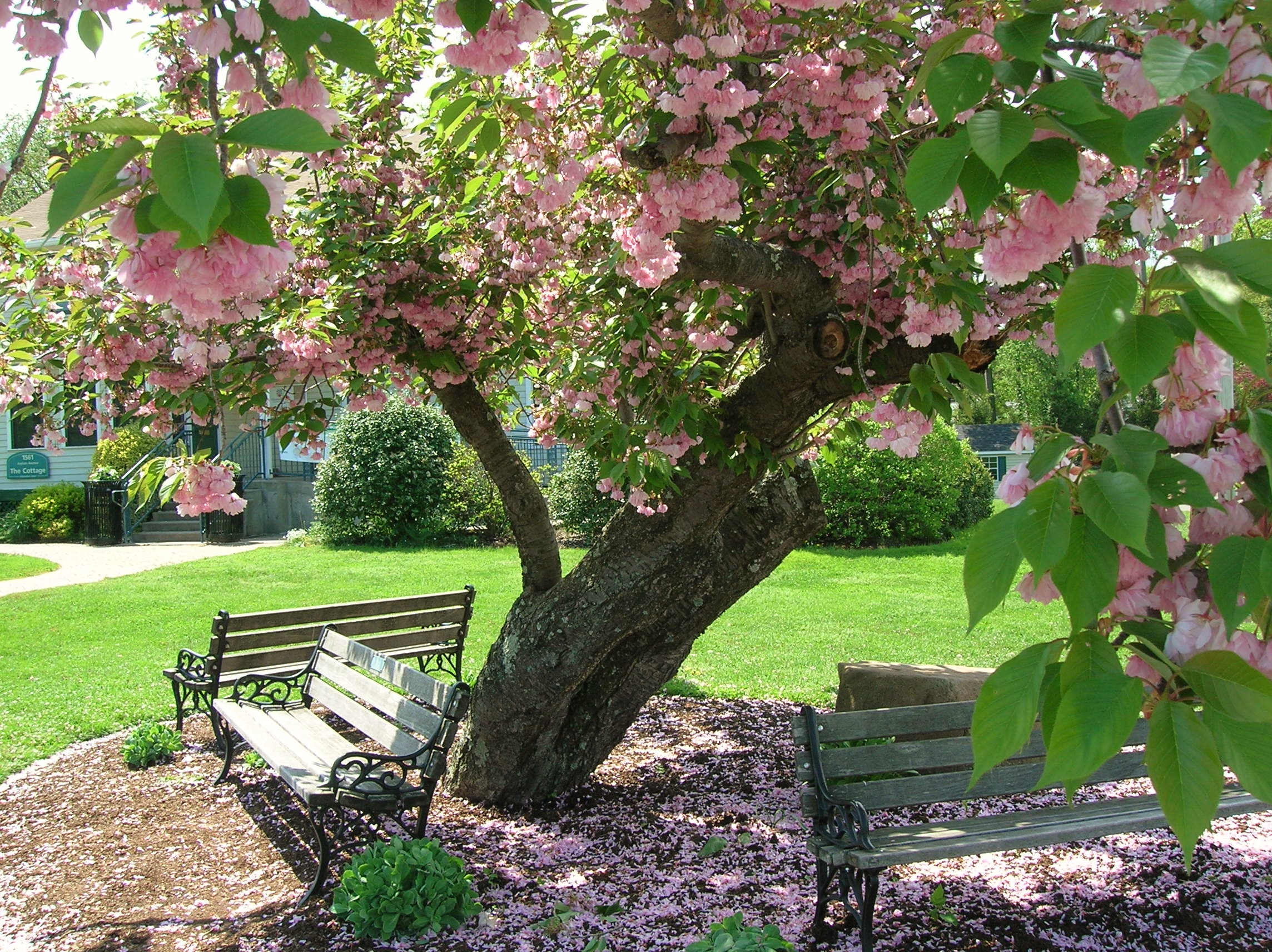
Kwanzan Cherry Tree, May 2013

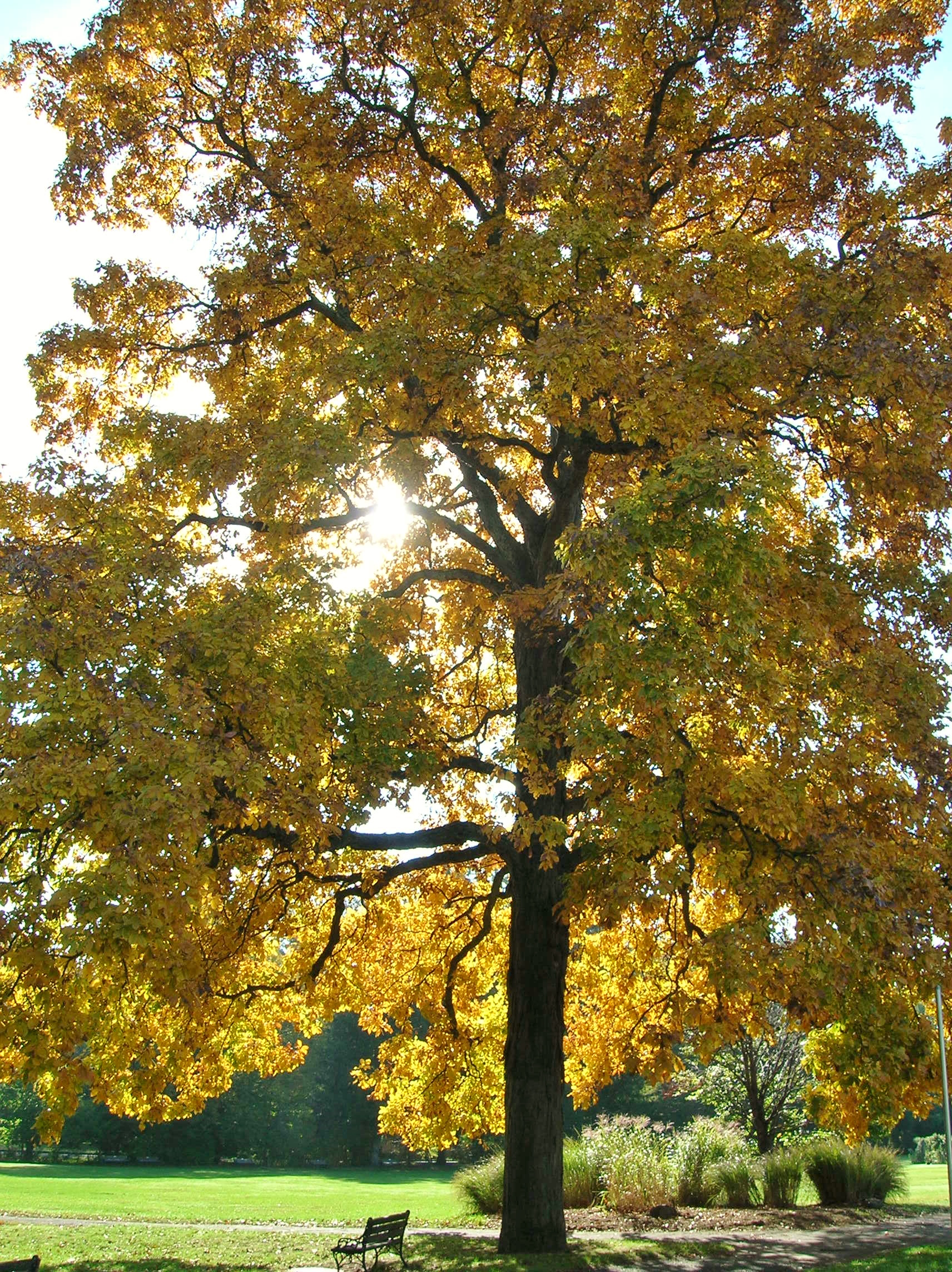
Shagbark Hickory, October 2010

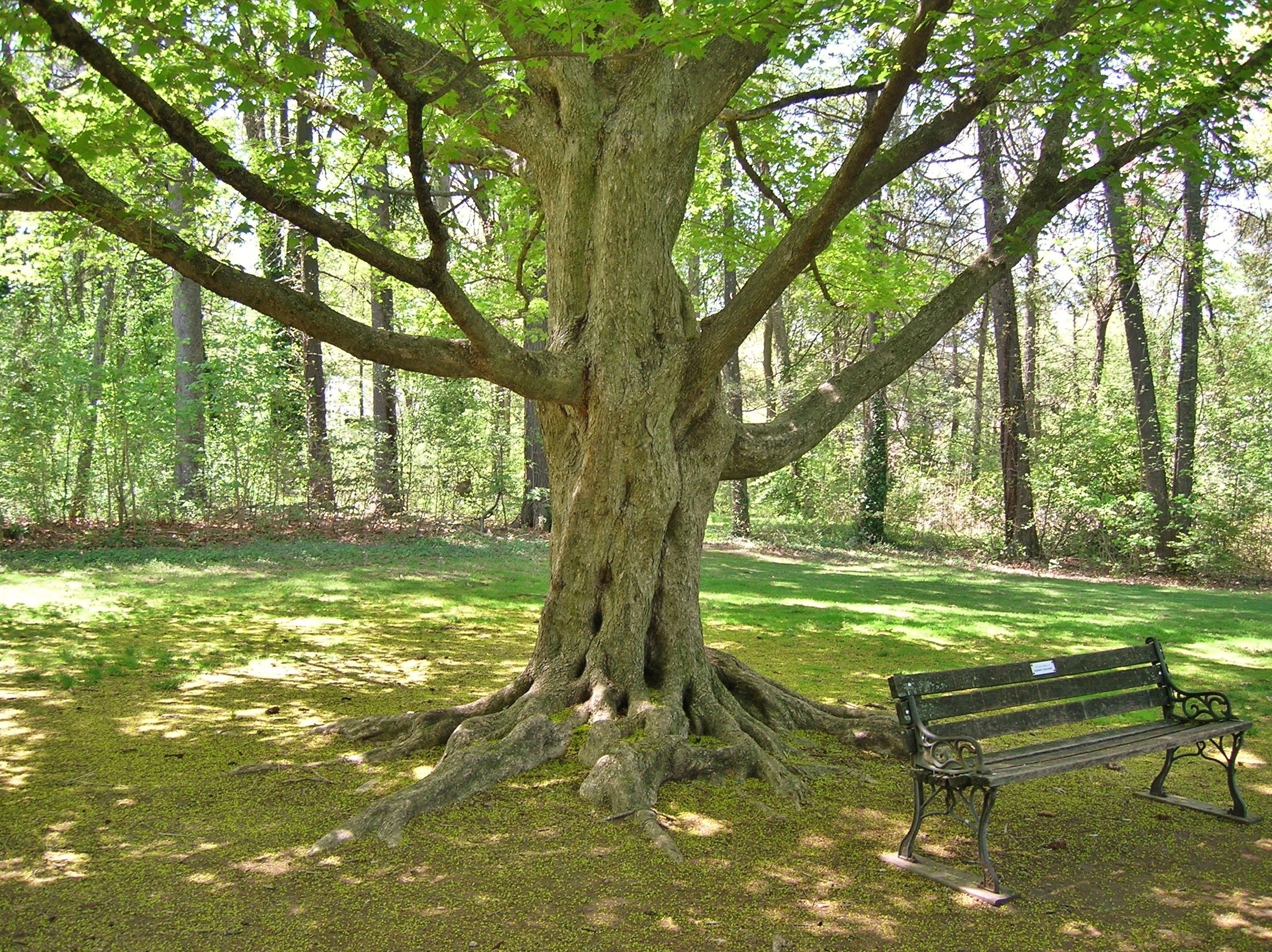
Savatieri Mono Maple, May 2015

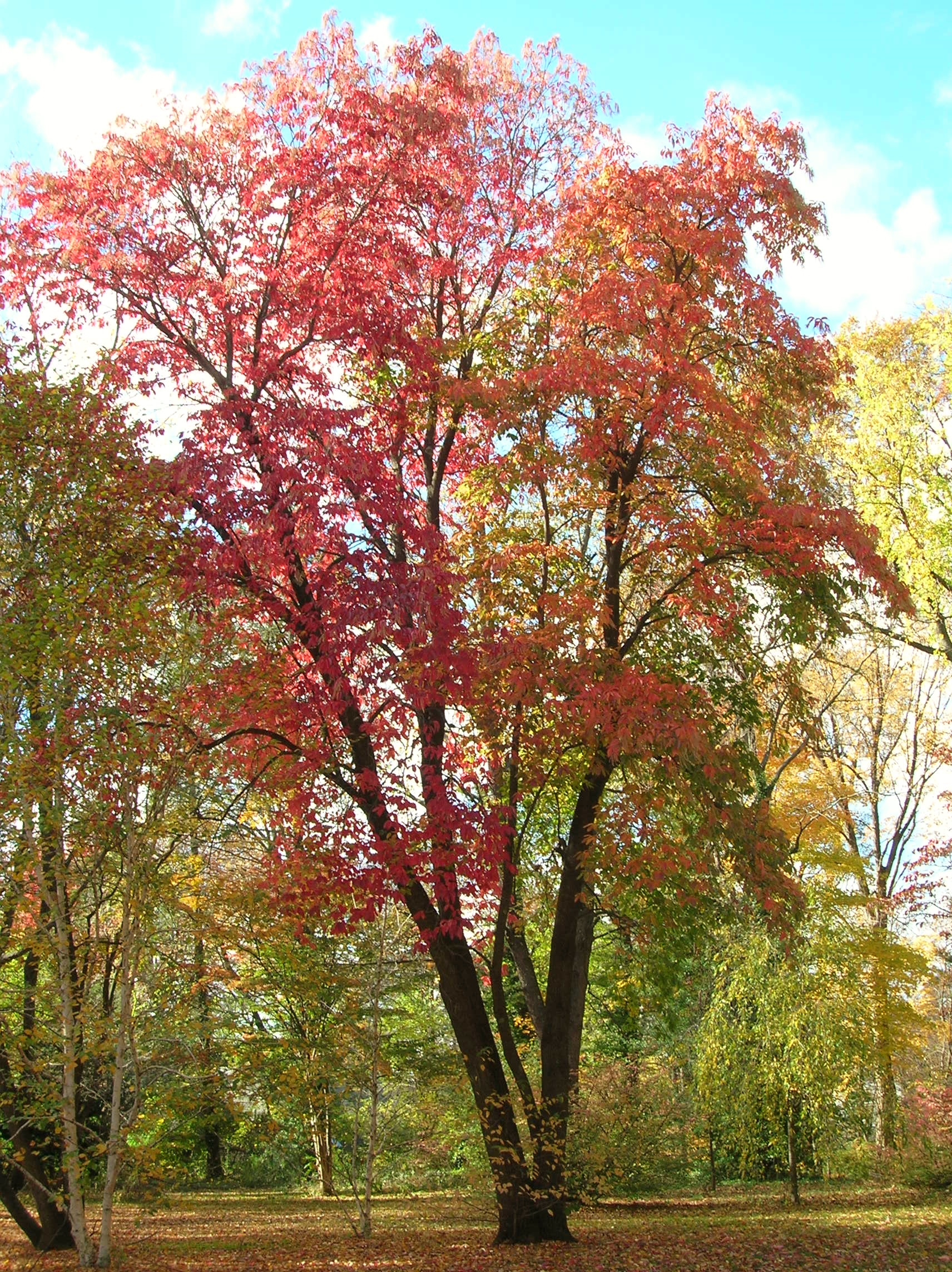
Sourwood Tree, October 2010

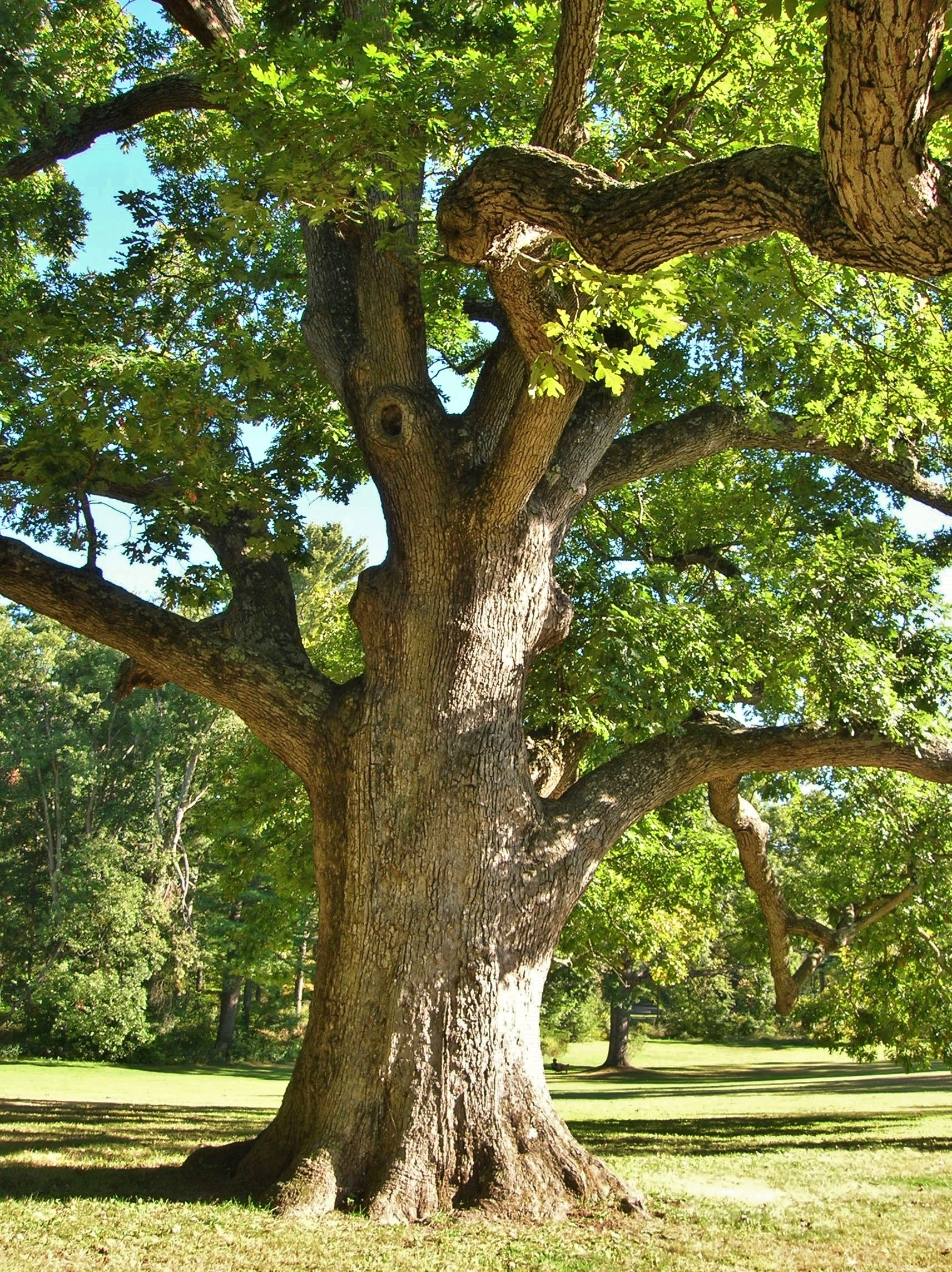
White Oak, September 2013 This tree was cut down in approximately 2021 because it had been damaged by an earlier storm and was not doing well.

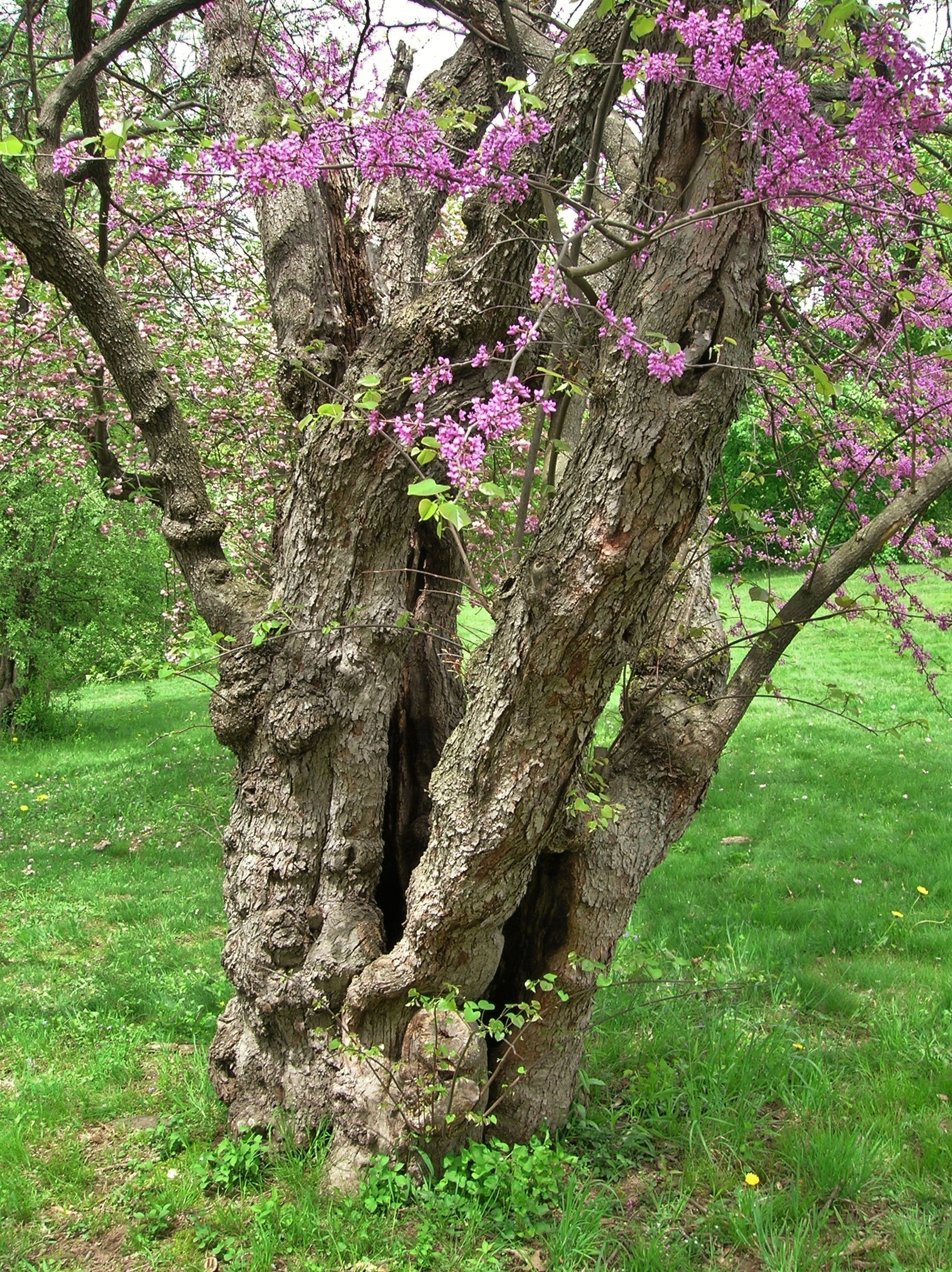
Redbud Tree, May 2015

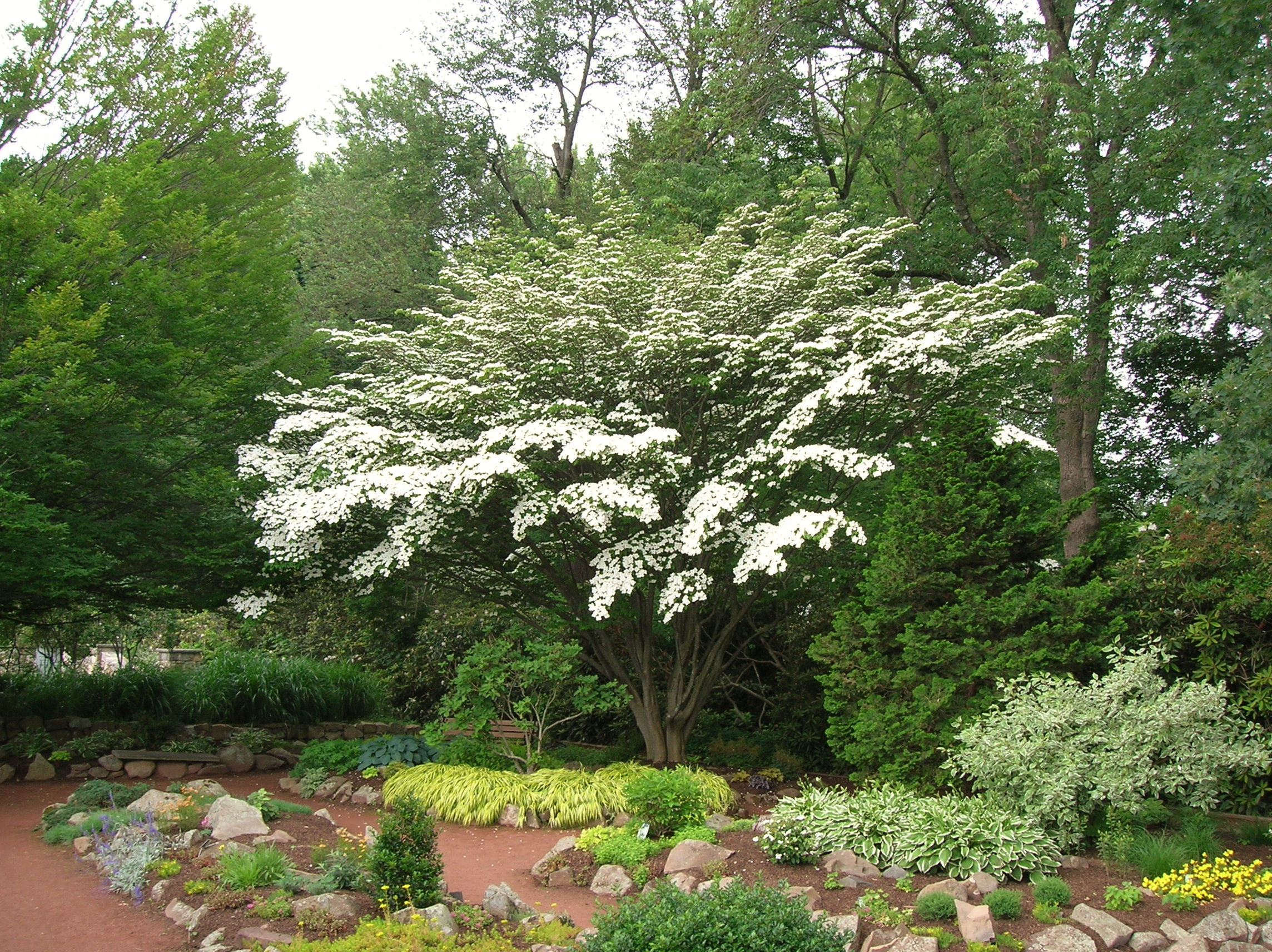
Kousa Dogwood, June 2015

== See also ==
- National Register of Historic Places listings in Hartford, Connecticut
- National Register of Historic Places listings in West Hartford, Connecticut
