= Trevor Holdsworth =

British academic (1927–2010)

Sir Trevor Holdsworth
- Born: George Trevor Holdsworth; 29 May 1927; Bradford, Yorkshire, England
- Died: 28 September 2010 (aged 83); Wimborne, Dorset, England
- Known for: Chairman of National Power, chancellor of University of Bradford
- Spouses: Patricia Ridler (m. 1951-1993; her death); Jenny Watson (m. 1995)

Sir George Trevor Holdsworth CVO (29 May 1927 – 28 September 2010) was the former chairman of National Power and of the Bradford-based Allied Colloids international chemical business. From 1992 until 1997 he was chancellor of the University of Bradford.

== Early life ==
He was born in Bradford and attended Hanson Boys' Grammar School and Keighley Boys' Grammar School (Oakbank School, Keighley since 1967). He was a chorister at Bradford Cathedral. In his National Service, he was a pianist for the British Forces' Network in Hamburg.

Later in 1985, played the Grieg Piano Concerto with the Royal Philharmonic Orchestra (RPO) with Norbert Balatsch at the Royal Festival Hall in a charity concert. He also played duets with Stephen Hough, and performed at Southwark Cathedral.

== Career ==
From 1952 to 1963 he worked for Bowater Paper (since 1994 called Rexam).

=== GKN ===
He joined the engineering conglomerate GKN. He was chairman from 1980 to 1988.

He was later the chairman of the Confederation of British Industry. He was chairman from 1983 to 1996 of Allied Colloids, and National Power from 1990 to 1995, and British Satellite Broadcasting (now called Sky UK since November 2018) from 1987 to 1990.

== Personal life ==
He received a knighthood in the 1982 New Year Honours, and the CVO in the 1997 New Year Honours. He married Patricia Ridler in 1951, who was a violinist and actress, having three sons; she died in 1993. He married Jenny Watson in 1995. He died aged 83 in September 2010.

Academic offices
| Preceded by John Harvey-Jones | Chancellor of the University of Bradford; 1992–1997 | Succeeded by Betty Lockwood, Baroness Lockwood |
Business positions
| Preceded by New company | Chairman of National Power; 1990 – 1995 | Succeeded by Sir John Baker |
| Preceded by Sir Barrie Heath | Chairman of GKN; 1980 – 1988 | Succeeded by Sir David Lees |
| Preceded by | Chairman of British Satellite Broadcasting; 1987 – 1990 | Succeeded by Company became British Sky Broadcasting |
