= Waste Warriors =

Non-governmental organisation in India

- Formation: September 2012
- Founder: Jodie Underhill and Tashi Pareek
- Type: NGO
- Website: http://wastewarriors.org/

Waste Warriors is a non-governmental organisation which undertakes waste collection, waste management consultancy, event waste management, and other related projects in Dehradun, Dharamshala, Corbett National Park, Goa, Himachal Pradesh and other parts of India. It was founded by Jodie Underhill and Tashi Pareek.

== Work ==
Waste Warriors has done extensive work in the area of waste collection and waste management. Since they were registered in 2012, Waste Warriors has collected and processed over 4223 tonnes of waste from Bhagsunag and Triund. Due to the efforts of Waste Warriors, Triund is now known as one of the cleanest hiking destinations in India. In the year 2015-16, Waste Warriors collected 175,656 kg of waste from Corbett, 190,908 kg from Dehradun and 272,928 kg from Dharamsala. Waste Warriors were in waste management duty for three Airtel Hyderabad Marathons, two Wipro Chennai Marathons, and IPL matches conducted in Dharamsala and Mohali Cricket Stadium. They help in the waste management at Sunburn Music Festival.

== Recognition ==
- May 2017 - Emerging NGO Award (SPO India)
- October 2016 - Mountain Protection Award, Waste Warriors Dharamsala project (UIAA International Mountaineering and Climbing Federation)
- September 2014 - Grassroots Women of the Decade Award, Co-founder Jodie Underhill (Women Economic Forum, Assocham Ladies League)
- February 2012 - Amazing Indians Award, Co-founder Jodie Underhill (Times Now & Mahindra)
- July 2010 - Green Hero Award, Co-founder Jodie Underhill (Centre for Media Studies)

== See also ==
- Swacch Bharat Abhiyan
- Clean India
- The Ugly Indian
- Jodie Underhill
