= Eva Grant =

Figure photographer (1925–2024)

- Born: 25 March 1925; Istanbul, Turkey
- Died: 22 January 2024 (aged 98); London, England
- Known for: Nude photography
- Spouses: Cyril Grant, John Hatch, Baron Hatch of Lusby

Eva Grant (25 March 1925 – 22 January 2024) was a Turkish-born Greek and British glamour photographer who worked in the male-dominated glamour industry of the 1950s and early 1960s. She worked and lived in Britain and became known for her nude studies and her pocket magazine Line and Form, which ran for over forty issues.

== Early life ==
Eva Grant was born in Istanbul, Turkey, to Greek parents on 25 March 1925. The family emigrated to Greece in 1930 and settled in Athens, where she spent the Second World War and her formative and teenage years.

== Life in London ==
Aged 22, Grant moved to London and began work as a student nurse at Shenley Hospital, a psychiatric institution in Hertfordshire. She supplemented her income by doing the occasional assignment as a swimwear model. She found modelling boring and was more interested in what was going on behind the camera. With her first husband, Cyril Grant, she rented out a basement flat with a darkroom attached as a studio to amateur photographers. Soon she was taking her own photographs and getting commissions from British and French magazines, such as Paris Hollywood.

== Career ==
Grant often worked with professional nude models such as Lorraine Burnett, June Palmer, and Lee Sothern (aka Grace Jackson). In 1956 she went to New York; the Evening Standard ran the story: "Photographer Eva Grant goes to New York armed with hundreds of pictures of beautiful girls to take America by storm." Her work thereafter appeared regularly in American photography magazines, such as those published by Fawcett and Whitestone: Glamour Photos, Camera Studies of Figure Beauty and Salon Photography. As her career progressed, she began giving talks and lectures on figure photography. Her outdoor nudes frequently appeared in the naturist magazine Health & Efficiency. The 1964 spring issue of Figure Annual called her "the world's foremost female figure photographer" while the British photography press described her as "one of the most expert and experienced woman glamour photographers in the business".

By the mid-1960s, the heyday of figure studies and innocent glamour work was coming to an end. In 1964 Grant gave up photography and sold her studio; shortly afterward, she had her fourth child.

During the 1970s, Grant became a tour guide for the London Tourist Board, and continued this into the 1980s.

== Later life and death ==
Grant separated from her first husband and married Lord Hatch of Lusby, a prominent anti-apartheid campaigner, who died in 1992.

Grant died in Kew, London on 22 January 2024, at the age of 98.

== Bibliography ==
- The Glamour Camera of Eva Grant, Wolfbait Books, 2023.
- Line and Form: a Nostalgic Review of Eva Grant’s Glamour Magazine of the 1950s, Wolfbait Books, 2023.
- Glamour Model Revue by Eva Grant, featuring June Palmer, Paula Page and Tina Madison, Wolfbait Books, 2024.
