= Jodie Underhill =

Waste expert and environmentalist

Ms. Jodie Underhill
- Born: 1976 (age 49–50); Great Yarmouth, England
- Occupations: Co- Founder and CEO, Waste Warriors

Jodie Underhill is the co-founder of Waste Warriors, a non-governmental organisation (NGO) headquartered in Dehradun, India, that specialises in waste collection and waste management. Her work has led the Indian media to give her the nicknames 'Garbage Girl' and 'Waste Warrior'. She is a British expatriate, and her work in India has brought her recognition in various forms such as the 'Brand Icon Award' by The Times of India and the 'Green Hero Award' by Center of Media Studies.

== Background ==
Born in Great Yarmouth, England, Jodie completed her schooling from Oakbank School, Keighley, England. She worked as a fundraising assistant and volunteer coordinator for charities such as Rossendale Hospice, a receptionist, a personal assistant and a legal editor after which she spent the majority of her twenties travelling the world and came to India in December 2008 as a tourist. After visiting Mumbai, Goa, Karnataka, Kerala and Kanyakumari, in 2009 she reached the Tibetan Children's Village in McLeod Ganj, Dharamsala, where she had volunteered to conduct letter-writing workshops for sponsorship secretaries. She was upset that Dharamsala's beauty was being marred by big mounds of garbage and decided to do something about this, which eventually led her to organising cleaning drives.

== Projects ==
=== Mountain Cleaners ===
Jodie Underhill established Mountain Cleaners in 2009 to provide and promote sustainable waste management systems in Dharamsala and Dehradun. The organisation works with local people and businesses, government organisations, NGOs and schools to provide sustainable waste management solutions, ensuring that rubbish is disposed of correctly and as much of it as possible is reused or recycled. She resigned from Mountain Cleaners in August 2012.

=== Waste Warriors ===
Waste Warriors was registered in September 2012 with Jodie Underhill as a co-founder. The organisation is now supported by Executive Managing Committee and has done extensive work in the area of waste collection, waste management and waste consultancy. Waste Warriors’ has also conducted various educational programs on the environment in over 90 schools funded by Microsoft. The Mahindra Group is a significant benefactor of Waste Warriors and has shown support by donating vehicles and sponsoring the entire Corbett project launched by Waste Warriors. Various other initiatives including a cow shelter, a cow helpline, and a cow adoption scheme.

== Recognition ==
- February 2016 - Brand Icon Award (The Times of India)
- March 2015 - REX Karmaveer Global Fellowship (United Nations & International Confederation of NGO’S - ICONGO)
- February 2015 - Service Before Self Award (Mumbai Rotary Club)
- September 2014 - Grassroots Women of the Decade Award (Women Economic Forum, Assocham Ladies League)
- February 2012 - Amazing Indians Award (Times Now & Mahindra)
- July 2010 - Green Hero Award (Centre for Media Studies)

== See also ==
- Swacch Bharat Abhiyan
- The Ugly Indian
