= Ethel Frances Donaghue =

American philanthropist

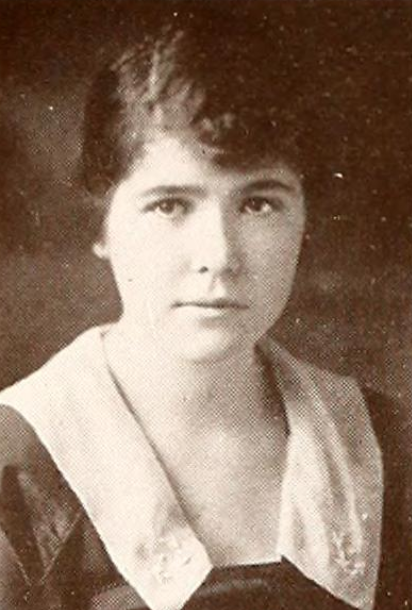
- Ethel Frances Donaghue, from the 1917 yearbook of Vassar College
- Born: July 6, 1896; Hartford, Connecticut, U.S.
- Died: December 30, 1989 (age 93); West Hartford, Connecticut, U.S.
- Occupation(s): Lawyer, philanthropist

Ethel Frances Weldon Donaghue (July 6, 1896 – December 30, 1989) was an American lawyer, socialite, and philanthropist. She left over $50 million to fund medical research, through the Donaghue Foundation.

== Early life and education ==
Donaghue was born in Hartford, Connecticut, the daughter of Patrick Donaghue and Catherine Weldon Donaghue. Her father was an Irish immigrant who built a fortune in real estate and liquor sales in Connecticut, and died when she was a teenager. She graduated from Vassar College in 1917, and from the University of Pennsylvania Law School in 1920. She earned an Doctor of Juridical Science degree from New York University School of Law in 1922.

== Career ==
Donaghue worked for the United States Department of Justice, where she specialized in admiralty law from 1920 to 1922. She was admitted to the New York bar in 1922, and the Connecticut bar in 1926. She practiced law focused on trusts and real estate in Hartford until 1933, when she retired to care for her mother and her family's properties. She traveled with her mother and brother, and threw lavish parties. Her brother sued her in 1941, over the division of their inherited properties.

She established the Donaghue Foundation in 1977, to fund medical research on cancer and heart disease.

== Later life and legacy ==
Donaghue broke her hip in 1976, and had a series of debilitating strokes in 1980. The management of her estate by conservators after 1980 became a complicated social and political controversy when probate judge James H. Kinsella gave a close friend and a former clerk power over the Donaghue fortune. The judge resigned in the face of possible impeachment. She died in 1989, at the age of 93, at her home in West Hartford.

Donaghue left most of her family's sizeable fortune, over $50 million, to fund cancer research through the Donaghue Foundation, with a smaller fund to maintain Hartford's Elizabeth Park. Her law school papers are in the collection of the University of Connecticut Library. In 1993, her home in West Hartford was the Hartford Junior League's "decorator show house". Her estate was in the news again in 2021, when one of her heirs' legal fees were described as "excessive".

The Ethel F. Donaghue Women's Health Investigator Awards at Yale University fund medical researchers focused on women's health, including Akiko Iwasaki, Peter Salovey, and Sally Shaywitz.
