= Beautification =

Process of implementing aesthetic enhancements to a municipal or urban setting

Beautification is the process of making visual improvements to a town, city, or urban area. This most often involves planting trees, shrubbery, and other greenery, but frequently also includes adding decorative or historic-style street lights and other lighting and replacing broken pavement, often with brick or other natural materials. Cobblestone is sometimes used for crosswalks; they provide the additional benefit of slowing motorists.

Beautification projects are often undertaken by city councils to refurbish their downtown areas, in order to boost tourism or other commerce. Often, this is also spurred by broken sidewalks, which pose a safety hazard for pedestrians and potentially insurmountable obstacles for wheelchair users. These projects are frequently part of other larger projects such as construction, especially in conjunction with ones for transit, such as streets and roads and mass transit.

The Laurel Hill Association of Stockbridge, Massachusetts, founded in 1853, is the oldest incorporated village beautification society in the United States. The Memphis City Beautiful Commission, the oldest city beautification project in the United States, was established in 1930.

== See also ==
- Aesthetics
  - Urban life
  - Landscape design
- Beautification and conservation plant
- City Beautiful movement
- The Ugly Indian
