= Laurel Hill Association =

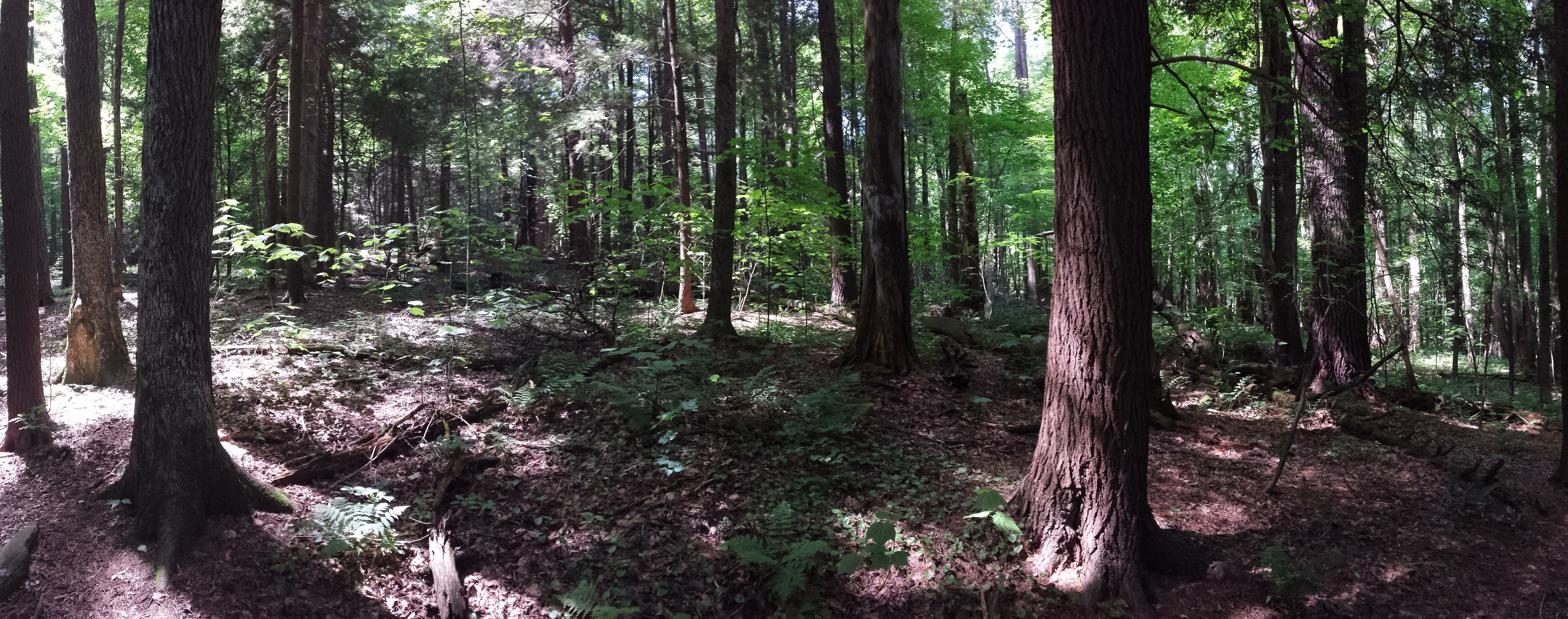
Panorama of woods on the Ice Glen Trail in Stockbridge, MA - trail maintained by the Laurel Hill Association

The Laurel Hill Association is the oldest village beautification society in the United States. Founded in 1853 in Stockbridge, Massachusetts, it has played a key role in the beautification of the town. It owns the property for Laurel Hill, near the Stockbridge town center and maintains the trail for the Ice Glen.

In the 1880s, the Laurel Hill Association helped create Stockbridge's reputation as an attractive village by managing weeds, laying sidewalks, installing lamps, planting trees and helping construct the local library. This encouraged the growth of tourism and summer residence, including the Berkshire Cottages.
