= The Ugly Indian =

Anonymous volunteer group in India

- Formation: 2010
- Legal status: Anonymous group
- Purpose: A movement of anonymous volunteers working together to clean up Indian streets
- Location: Bangalore
- Region served: India
- Members: Members self-select themselves by writing to The Ugly Indian
- Owner: Annamik Naagri
- Website: www.theuglyindian.com

The Ugly Indians (TUI) are an anonymous group of volunteers who clean roads in India. Volunteers can join TUI by sending a mail to The Ugly Indian or by registering one's name and email address on TUI's official Facebook page.

== Spotfixing ==
TUI calls cleaning the street "spotfixing". TUI chooses small segments of road each week to clean: pavements piled up with plastic, defaced walls, footpaths rendered unusable by potholes as spotfixing places. All tools, materials and instructions are provided on the spot. All spot-fixes are self-funded and volunteers are requested to make a contribution towards material costs.

== Guidelines for volunteers ==
The Ugly Indian's philosophy is "Kaam chalu mooh bandh. Stop Talking, Start Working." Apart from this, TUI has general guidelines regarding spot-fixing.

- No lectures, no moralising, no activism, no self-righteous anger.
- No confrontation, no arguments, no debates, no pamphlets, no advocacy.
- Don't step on anyone's toes, don't take sides in any ideological debates.
- Support existing systems and improve their effectiveness for the greater good.
- Basically, get real. Treat everyone with sincerity, respect and dignity first, and the greater good will be an outcome."

== Solution ==
TUI recognizes the spot-fix as a success only if:

- It lasts for at least 90 days.
- It requires no ongoing supervision.
- It is low-cost (ideally free) and easy to implement and replicate
- It changes the behaviour and attitudes of all concerned
- It creates minimal disruption in the daily actions of everyone concerned (nobody should lose a job, lose a source of income, or get seriously inconvenienced – because it takes only one Ugly Indian to undo the good work of a hundred others)

== Anonymity ==
Anonymity is a big attraction of the movement. The Ugly Indian describes itself as a "faceless, leaderless" volunteer organization. It is made up of self-driven and motivated people who are mostly professionals in the 25–40 age group. They remain strictly anonymous. The Ugly Indians have chosen to remain anonymous as the names and identities of specific individuals are not important and they respond to media queries only by email. This TEDx talk from 2014 provocatively titled 'Why is India so Filthy?' and delivered anonymously, outlines the philosophy of The Ugly Indian.

== History ==
=== Early days (2010–2011) ===
On November 15, 2010, The Ugly Indian was born as a community Facebook page to organize volunteers to clean the streets of Bengaluru. The group consisted of Bangaloreans deeply concerned about the conditions of civic spaces and attitudes of people towards them. The Ugly Indian started their mission by first observing and learning about conditions on the ground attempting to “understand why we [Bengalureans] have such low civic standards and tolerate incredible amounts of filth on the streets.” From the start, The Ugly Indian has eschewed publicity and has wished to remain anonymous. Members consisted of a volunteer force of self-motivated working professionals looking to go out to make a difference in their community. According to a 2011 Deccan Herald interview, one volunteer stated, “There has been no attempt to recruit volunteers or seek publicity. This is just a few people who decided to go and 'do' things rather than talk about them. And others who saw them / heard about them are doing the same. It's as simple as that.”

The Ugly Indian project gained momentum after conducting several small experiments based on their observations to understand what tactics and techniques work and do not work at keeping public spaces clean. Their motto and work philosophy is kaam chalu mooh bandh (Stop Talking, Start Doing).

Their earliest efforts in Bengaluru started on MG Road and Church Street, a bustling commercial and nightlife area in the heart of Bengaluru's Central Business District. Church Street is a major tourist attraction and a centerpiece of ‘Brand Bangalore’, the street suffered from a wide variety of filth issues including large trash piles, public urination points, paan stains, broken footpaths and safety issues. The group kicked off their drive to clean the city by removing open dumping, scrubbing paan stains, fixing footpaths and painting previously dirty surfaces up and down the street. The improvements completed by The Ugly Indian on Church Street were a manifestation of the knowledge gained from observing and experimenting and showed evidence that their approach did indeed work; traders on the street began better maintaining their street and citizens delighted in the new “not-so-ugly” Church Street.

Part of these early initiatives included The Ugly Indian's TereBin program that began in mid 2011. This program set out to install individual or business sponsored dustbins at various points along Church Street, MG Road and Brigade Road. The dustbins were designed to be attractive, easy to use and help reduce littering in these areas. Aside from keeping public spaces clean, the program was also designed to help waste pickers manage litter with proper equipment, create good jobs and bring about further attitude changes of the public. According to one volunteer, “The idea is to give dignity to the process of garbage clearance - only when we, as a society, respect our sanitation workers, will there be a sustainable change.”

On November 12, 2011, The Ugly Indian celebrated its first anniversary by throwing a unique challenge called the ‘Ugly Indian Treasure Hunt’. Citizens and media persons were invited to ‘find trash’ over a 3 kilometer area, and volunteers marched silently along with them symbolically carrying spades, brooms, paint and brushes in case any ugly spots were found by anyone’. None were found, and the streets were declared ‘clean’. This was the first of many such ‘Trashure Hunts’ organized by The Ugly Indian – a unique way to allow for public inspection of clean streets. With their birthday rally, volunteers showcased what they had accomplished in the past year by placing pictures at spot-fixed areas to show people how they looked before intervention.

The activities being conducted by volunteers over the last year on and around Church Street had left many in Bangalore wondering just who were behind this “Silent Revolution” taking place on the streets of the city. When the New York-based magazine “Time Out” launched its Bangalore edition, it asked this question on its cover – The Ugly Indian: ‘Who the Hell are They?’

=== Beginning of partnership with government agencies (2012–2013) ===
Beginning in 2012, The Ugly Indian began to expand its area of influence, take on a wider variety of projects and partner with more organizations. In September 2012, with support from Bangalore Metro Rail Corporation Limited (BMRCL), the Ugly Indian set their sights on the Namma Metro pillars below the Trinity Station. U A Vasanth Rao, general manager (finance) of BMRCL, sent out workers of BMRCL to participate in the clean-up activity alongside volunteers. 150 participants in total washed paan stains from the pillars, cleaned up the mess and added designs to the pillars to discourage further spitting.

In May 2013, The Ugly Indian, with the help of BESCOM officials, painted 100 BESCOM electrical boxes in 29 days. BESCOM Managing Director, P Manivannan was quoted in The New Indian Express saying, “It is a path-breaking achievement by them. They have shown the people how to go beyond just talking about things. We appreciate the group coming forward [to do this work].”

In late 2013, The Ugly Indian ran the Ugly Indian Beauty Contest where members of the public voted to choose the best candidate for an intervention and beautification. What followed was one of its largest and longest projects yet near the Koramangala Passport Office where a large cluster of garbage nicknamed ‘The Mother of All Blackspots’ were removed and the space was rehabilitated. The spot was chosen by the public. Waste was removed, new footpaths were installed, walls painted trees were painted and nearly 600 ft of public space was reclaimed. A wide variety of people came out to help including: BBMP garbage staffers, pourakarmikas, cleaning maids, shopkeepers, paanwallas, office staff, staff from BESCOM, BSNL & BWSSB and volunteer citizens.

=== Scale and impact: local and international (2014–2017) ===
Since its creation, the group has inspired several other volunteer organizations in Bangalore and beyond. By 2014, there were at least five known Bangalore-based volunteer organizations formed to further The Ugly Indian's mission: Whitefield Rising, Banaswadi Rising, Koramangala Rising, Indiranagar Rising, Jayanagar Rising. Additionally, their influence was spreading around India with ‘spot fixing’ activities being recorded in places like Mysore, Coimbatore, Chennai, Mumbai and the National Capital region.

At Tedx Bangalore 2014, an anonymous volunteer of The Ugly Indian presented the group's vision for Bangalore's public spaces and showcased their work. Shortly after, Prime Minister Narendra Modi tweeted about The Ugly Indian's Tedx presentation bringing more awareness to the group. Since posted on YouTube, the video has been viewed 4.7 million times. As the group's popularity grew, politicians, government officials and corporations began to take greater notice of the activities of The Ugly Indian. In mid 2014, Bengaluru's Mayor BS Sathyanarayana joined citizen volunteers to help with a ‘spotfix’ to reclaim an underground pedestrian subway at KR Circle and again at a ‘spotfix’ at Thyagarajanagar in Basavanagudi ward. Interactions with the Mayor BS Sathyanarayana resulted in The Ugly Indians first official collaborations with Bruhat Bengaluru Mahanagara Palike (BBMP), a relationship that continues today. In 2015, The Ugly Indian was named in US based business magazine Fast Company's list of The World's Top 10 Most Innovative Companies of 2015 in India.

In 2015, The Ugly Indian in partnership with Bruhat Bengaluru Mahanagara Palike (BBMP) launched their ‘Under the Flyover’ (UFO) project to reclaim areas under flyovers. The ambitious project fixed more than 25 flyovers across the city by hauling out trash, removing posters and painting vibrant geometric patterns on the pillars of the flyovers.

=== Hard at work (2018–2019) ===
By 2018, The Ugly Indian had grown from a few volunteers to an organization with thousands of "spotfixes" completed, government and corporate partnerships, and an expanding reach across Bangalore. In early 2018, BBMP launched the Clean Bengaluru Campaign, and The Ugly Indian partnered with it on several projects. In late 2018, The Ugly Indian helped BBMP identify garbage blackspots in the city for the "blackspot challenge", which cleared 200 blackspots between 1 October and 20 November 2018.

In 2019, The Ugly Indian teamed up with BBMP for a new initiative called ‘Adopt a Street’ inviting citizens and corporations to maintain visual cleanliness of city streets. The program consisted of three categories: street cleaning, street greening and street walkability and sought to improve conditions of streets in all of these categories. The program was designed to come at no cost to BBMP and required adopting organizations to support the costs of improvement from their Corporate Social Responsibility (CSR) Program and relying on volunteers to conduct the work.

=== COVID-19 (2020–2021) ===
While COVID-19 raged across India and the world, The Ugly Indian did their part to help fight the spread of the virus. The Ugly Indian and BBMP teamed up to create wall paintings and install custom-designed posters creating awareness about COVID-19 helplines in over 300 locations in Bengaluru. Additionally, The Ugly Indian distributed over 500,000 free reusable cloth masks to residents in slums around the city with the ‘Lets Mask India’ campaign. In 2021 When social distancing and COVID-19 safety at Primary Health Centers (PHCs) became a concern, The Ugly Indian stepped in with its unique SafeVAX initiative to improve safety at Vax Centres by offering social distancing kits and safety equipment to be distributed to PHCs to help keep patients distances and lower risk of spreading the virus.

=== Post COVID (since 2022) ===
As the COVID-19 pandemic receded, The Ugly Indian wasted little time getting back to work on ever more ambitious projects to address cleanliness in public spaces. 2022 saw the introduction of The Ugly Indian's CleanStreet500KMChallenge where the group mapped 500 km of city roads and keep tabs on their cleanliness. The 500 km of road were broken down into 50 loops of 10 km each from different parts of the city to ensure a more even distribution. The information generated from the 500 km challenge will be presented to the public for review. As part of this initiative, Mahadevapura, one of the 8 zones of BBMP took up the challenge and launched the CleanStreet75KMChallenge Mahadevapura on February 24, 2022. This initiative was launched by the chief minister of Karnataka, Basavaraj Bommai, along with Aravind Limbavali, the MLA of Mahadevapura.

Partnership with Greater Bengaluru Authority (since 2025)

With the restructuring of Bengaluru’s municipal administration under the Greater Bengaluru Authority in Sept 2025, The Ugly Indian started developing working relationships with each of the 5 newly formed Corporations.

The first city-wide initiative supported was Project Walkaluru – a campaign to promote safe and clean pedestrian infrastructure in partnership with GBA and BangaloreWALKS. As part of this unique project, groups of citizens and government officers walked 100 kilometres on the city’s footpaths over 13 walks – averaging 5-8kms per walk – between Nov 1, 2025 and March 1, 2026, to assess the city’s pedestrian infrastructure. These walks saw the participation of elected representatives, Corporation Commissioners, senior engineers, health and sanitation teams, local residents and citizens from across the city who participated enthusiastically to celebrate the city’s walkable footpaths. The unique aspect of these Walkaluru walks, was that citizens assessed the footpaths for safety, cleanliness and walkability, and their feedback was recorded on video, and shared widely in the social media.

Case Study; Bengaluru North City Corporation - BNCC

Pommala Sunil Kumar, Commissioner, BNCC, took strong personal interest in the Walkaluru campaign, as a way of understanding the people’s issues first-hand, and participated in 50kms of walks over 8 walks held in different parts of the Corporation. He encouraged his senior colleagues – from Joint Commissioners and Chief Engineers to, Executive Engineers and Asst General Managers to join, and invited senior officers from other agencies including BESCOM and BWSSB. As a result of this high level of senior officer participation, most of the issues on the walking routes were either resolved in the days before the walk, or immediately after. Teams from The Ugly Indian worked closely with BNCC officers and staff to document, resolve and monitor issues. More importantly, several issues that affect pedestrian safety, that normally escape attention, were identified and experienced, and this was a crucial input during Budget formulation. The budget for BNCC for 2026-27 included a budget of Rs 18 crore only for Footpath Maintenance, which is unprecedented in the city’s budgeting, and it can attributed to the impact of the Walkaluru campaign.

Walkaluru Walks in BNCC included the Thanisandra 10KM Walk, Banaswadi 5KM Walk, Yelahanka 10KM Walk, RT Nagar 7KM Walk, Kammanahalli 5KM Walk, Kodigeghalli 5KM Walk, Dasarahalli 3KM Walk and the Yelahanka Lake 5KM Walk. Over 500 people participated in these 8 Footpath Walks, which covered important areas of BNCC.

UB100 Campaign

Another important and pioneering effort at City Cleanliness was the UB100 – Uttara Bengaluru 100 – campaign launched by BNCC Commissioner, Pommala Sunil Kumar on June 5, 2026 World Environment Day. UB100 was an ambitious campaign to eliminate 100 Garbage Black Spots in 45 days, with participation from all departments and local citizens, using the Spotfixing remplate developed by The Ugly Indian. The project received whole-hearted support and participation and achieved its target of 100 Spots in just 42 days. Minister for Bengaluru Development, Sri Krishna Byre Gowda participated in the 100th spot at Thanisandra and acknowledged its impact. This was a forerunner to the city-wide campaigns launched by GBA on Aug 1 – Freedom from Waste and Just Clean Bengaluru.

Seeing the success and popular support for the UB100 campaign, Commissioner Pommala Sunil Kumar challenged his team and The Ugly Indian to eliminate a further 50 Garbage Black Spots in the next 10 days, and the target of 150 Spots was achieved on Aug 14, 2026. These 150 spots are now under constant monitoring and surveillance, and this campaign has become a model for ensuring clean streets and elimination of Black spots at scale.

== Projects ==
=== Project Under the Flyover (UFO) ===
Project UFO was started by TUI in Bangalore, India to clean and reclaim spaces under flyovers. This project is citizen led and has transformed 30 flyovers since 2015. The UFO project has already spread to New Delhi, Pune and Chennai where new groups have taken up the responsibility of cleaning and beautifying these unmaintained spaces.

==== Progression of Project UFO ====
Project UFO was created in order to combat unwanted posters, open urination, garbage dumping and illegal parking in spaces underneath flyovers. There is an observation called ‘The Broken Window theory’ which states that if there is a broken window on a street, windows on that same street are more likely to be broken. This effect can be caused by vandals who assume that since one window is broken, it is acceptable for more windows to be broken. It may also be caused by everyday people who see a broken window and think that they do not have a responsibility to repair their own window. Activities such as garbage dumping and graffiti spread in the same way that broken windows spread. The basis of Project UFO is to reclaim public spaces under flyovers by cleaning and beautifying them, thus reducing the chance that people will continue to dump waste and place unwanted posters in these areas.

The first attempt at reclaiming a flyover was by anonymous citizens in early 2015 and was completed at Richmond Circle flyover, Bangalore. According to one of the volunteers who was interviewed by 'The Hindu', the first attempt at rejuvenating the area under Richmond Circle flyover was a failure. The Ugly Indian refined their designs and tactics to dissuade people from defacing the pillars of the flyover and applied their new design pattern on Jayadeva Flyover in October 2015. In essence, these new designs were to act as poster repellent. Seizing upon their initial success, they replicated the work across 25 flyovers and exhibited the work done under Hebbal Flyover on 10 January 2016.

Although initially the funding was purely from citizens, emboldened by the success stories of Project UFO, private companies started taking active part by donating corporate social responsibility (CSR) funds to the cause. Political officials such as ex-Mayor K. S. Satyanarayana have participated in similar events and spot fixes under the flag of TUI.

==== Methodology ====
The primary method that the UFO project utilizes to reclaim public spaces is to attempt ‘spot fixes’. The design and paint color depicted in the finished pillar below are intended to prevent people from continuing to deface the flyover pillars, place posters and dump trash. Volunteers are recruited from companies donating CSR funds and from the general public via social media. To date nearly 4000 volunteers have spent their time working with TUI on their UFO project and have helped to reclaim over 30 flyovers. The cycle of fixing public spaces can be broken into four major sections.

===== #1 Erasing signs of neglect =====
The cause of neglect in public spaces can center around the fact that many of these spaces do not have a purpose. Areas under flyovers have typically been left unchanged in Bangalore after construction activities and with no purpose these UFO areas tend to fall into misuse. Removal of waste, posters and other discarded articles are done by volunteers to erase signs of neglect so that the space can be transformed into a space for the community. The dry waste from the flyovers is removed and sent to landfills in designated areas but the wet waste is redirected and is sent to processing plants across the city.

===== #2 Designing spaces of respect =====
Volunteers are provided with aprons and gloves and work to clean the area and paint the pillars with new, vibrant colors as a way to deter further misuse of the space. The design is uniform to ensure that posters are not placed in dead spaces; the uniform design is also not distracting to drivers. The iconic triangular design on a red, terracotta background was selected after several different designs were tried. The red background was selected to brighten the area at night and cover any staining that was present on the pillars before they were painted. The triangular pattern itself was intended to be easy to paint by novices while being visually engaging enough to drown out any posters that would be placed at eye level. All of the colors were chosen so that they would be secular and non-partisan to ensure that the message of beautification does not have any political meaning.

===== #3 Act of reclaiming public spaces =====
Cleaning and beautifying spaces under flyovers is the first step, but the most important act is to create an area that people are adverse to dumping garbage in and misusing. By giving the space a function, like installing benches or plants, it prevents people from disposing of garbage in that area. Under the Domlur flyover, a skating rink has been created as a way to engage the community and to ensure that the space remains clean and well used.

The primary purpose of the beautification and cleaning is to reclaim a public space by using visual cues to dissuade people from littering or dumping. This has caused a drop in the number of posters placed by 95% at flyovers that have been reclaimed under the UFO project.

===== #4 Continuing maintenance of areas =====
One of the keystones to creating a space that is part of the community is to ensure that it is well maintained. This creates a culture around the area to ensure that the space stays clean and well used. Companies such as Embassy group under their CSR program have donated funds for TUI to create a maintenance team that works to keep the areas that they have worked on clean after the initial project.

==== Critics of Project UFO ====
Project UFO has not been without objections to its mission. One of the most vocal opponents of the project is Assa Doron who stated that Project UFO and other movements like it, "[are] a form of aesthetic purification that addresses the dirt seen and smelt, but which has little regard for the wider structures of inequality underpinning public hygiene and waste-picking practices, let alone the question of waste generation, which is the product of capitalist consumption and production." He goes on to say that TUI is forcing the ideals of the middle class on society as a whole and are attempting to white wash a problem that has deeper, systemic roots. Given that Project UFO is based on a ‘spot-fix’ methodology, where volunteers come in, clean the space, then leave, Doron laments that this method leaves no way for critics to voice their concerns and ultimately leads to a ‘strong man’ mentality where only the voice of TUI is heard.

People who frequent the areas around the flyovers have some concerns as well; especially those that are the most impacted by the changes to the UFO areas. They believe that the project to reclaim spaces under flyovers has an important mission, but that the areas that have been ‘spot-fixed’ will not remain that way. These groups believe that spaces that were once dirty and misused will simply return to their previous state after several months.

==== Self-audit of the Project UFO ====
The Ugly Indian conducted a comprehensive survey on their UFO Project which audited nearly 2200 pillars (metro & flyover) on 17 April 2019. The survey was conducted on this date because it was the day prior to Lok Sabha Elections (General Elections) in Bangalore; elections typically produce a slew of new posters hung on every vertical surface which would allow TUI to see if their poster deterrent designs for flyover pillars were effective. Out of the 950 flyover pillars, only 4% were found defaced or marked with posters.

==== Government response ====
Emulating Project UFO BBMP has launched its own "Adopt-a-Flyover’’ initiative as part of the Clean Bangalore Campaign in 2018. Companies have the ability to adopt, maintain and beautify flyovers in and around Bangalore through this initiative. The first adopted flyover was Veeranapalya on the Outer Ring Road which was funded by L&T Technologies and designed by TUI. BBMP hopes that this will be the first of many adoptions in Bangalore which will help to keep the city clean and well maintained. Project UFO brought due attention to the abuse of public property and defacement of pillars.

== Products ==
=== tereBin ===
TereBins are dustbins provided by TUI for public use. TereBins weigh around 20–25 kilograms (44–55 lb) and are meant for paper cups, banana skins, cigarette packets and similar small litter. TUI provides tereBin service – which involves identifying ideal locations, installing the bins, setting up a daily clearing system and integrating with the local garbage clearance system and daily supervision. Terebins can be "adopted" (for a fee of INR 2,000).

=== WonderLOO ===
The wonderloo is an open urinal that protects the privacy of the users. The loo is unmanned and free to use. As of 2014, some 10 urinals are in operation. TUI, in association with the local BBMP office, ensures that each wonderloo is cleaned twice a day.

== Credit and advertising ==
According to TUI, they have declined multiple offers from companies wanting to sponsor tereBins and WonderLOOs in return for advertising. However, TUI accepts adoption requests, especially from companies, if they do so without advertising on the specific object.

== See also ==
- Swacch Bharat Abhiyan
- Clean India
- Waste Warriors
