= Laisterdyke =

Suburb of Bradford, West Yorkshire, England

Coordinates: 53.793°N 1.719°W

- Location within West Yorkshire
- OS grid reference: SE1933
- Metropolitan borough: City of Bradford
- Metropolitan county: West Yorkshire
- Region: Yorkshire and the Humber
- Country: England
- Sovereign state: United Kingdom
- Post town: BRADFORD
- Postcode district: BD4
- Dialling code: 01274
- Police: West Yorkshire
- Fire: West Yorkshire
- Ambulance: Yorkshire

Laisterdyke is an area of Bradford, West Yorkshire, England, situated to the east of the city on the border with the City of Leeds and located in the Bradford Moor ward and in the Bradford East parliamentary constituency. Laisterdyke borders Barkerend, Bradford Moor area, Thornbury, Tyersal, and Bowling.

== History ==
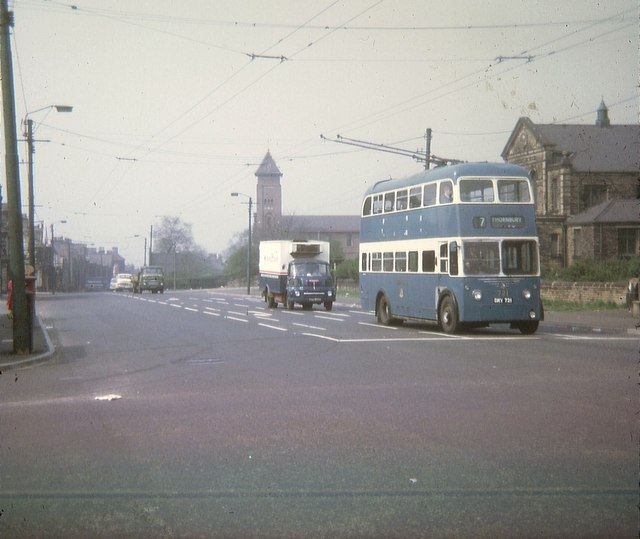
Bradford trolleybus in Laisterdyke (1971)

The Leeds-Bradford railway line passes through Laisterdyke however Laisterdyke railway station itself was closed to passengers in 1966. At Laisterdyke was a complex set of junctions controlled by Laisterdyke East and Laisterdyke West signal boxes on the Leeds-Bradford line.

In 1875, the Great Northern Railway opened its Laisterdyke - Shipley branch railway, a six-mile double track branch line from Quarry Gap junction to Shipley and Windhill railway station, passing Eccleshill, Idle and Thackley railway stations however the line was not competitive and after 1931 was made single line freight only, and progressively closed from 1966 to 1968.

In 1911 Britain's first trolleybus service commenced operation between Laisterdyke and Dudley Hill. The service stopped in 1972, the last trolleybus service in the UK.

Many years ago the Laisterdyke area had a number of small cinemas, namely the Kozey Picture Hall, Lyceum Picture House, Queen's Hall and Tivoli Picture Hall. In 1919 the 1118 seat, stone built Lyceum Picture House was constructed on Bradford Lane. Western Electric sound was installed in 1930 and in 1953 Bradford's first widescreen was installed and seating reduced. The cinema closed in 1962 reopening as Lyceum Bingo, Cabaret and Social Club and variously a cabaret bar, and snooker bar.

Today there is only one cinema in the locality, the Odeon Leeds-Bradford, a 13 screen multiplex cinema in the Gallagher Leisure Park off Dick Lane, in nearby Thornbury.

Laisterdyke local history group publish a number of books on the history of Laisterdyke.

== Economy ==
There are a number of restaurants and public houses in the area including The Swaine Green and Lyceum Bar. Local industry includes a manufacturer of air compressors, air tools and pneumatic equipment, a training centre, an engineering works, a gas distribution depot, and a vehicle dismantlers and scrap yard.

== Landmarks ==
There are listed buildings in the area on Killinghall Road, Mortimer Row, and Parratt Row, and at St Peters Chaplaincy (i.e. presbytery) on Leeds Road, serving St. Peter's Catholic Church, with its stable and coach house, also listed.

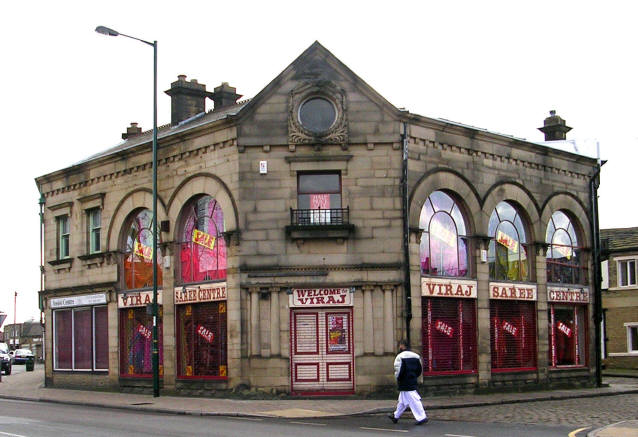
The old Yorkshire Bank now an Asian clothes shop

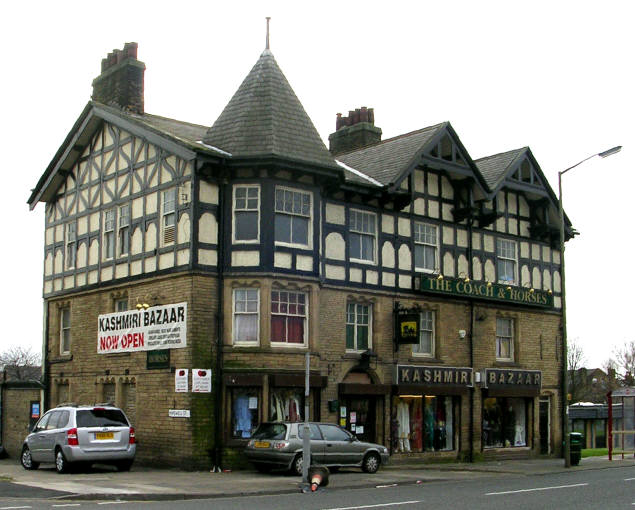
Former Coach and Horses pub, now an Asian clothes shop

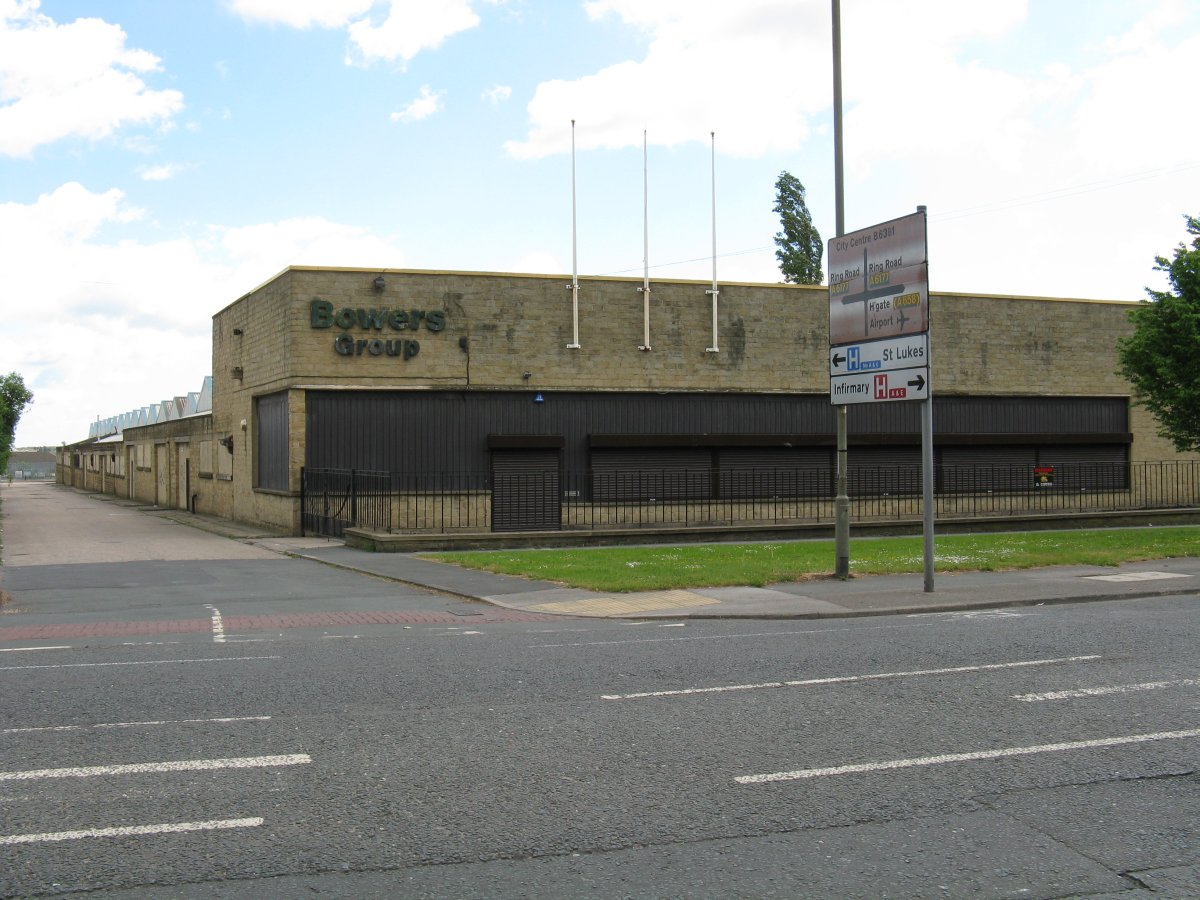
Bowers Group engineering works

== Education ==
Laisterdyke Leadership Academy is located in Thornbury Road, and is the first school in Bradford to be given Business and Enterprise specialist college status. Laisterdyke has a public lending library located off Leeds Road.

== Transport ==
The main roads through the area are the A647 Leeds Road, the A6177 Killinghall Road, Laisterdyke Lane, and Sticker Lane and the B6381 Barkerend Road, Coach Row, and Leeds Old Road. Laisterdyke is served by West Yorkshire Metro's, Orange line 606 and 607 bus services.

== Sport ==
Laisterdyke Cricket & Athletic Club have their sports ground and club off Sticker Lane, and are currently home to Northern F.C. of the Bradford Sunday Alliance Football League.

== Notable residents ==
The wrestler Les Kellett was born in Laisterdyke. In 1864 Emma Sharp from Laisterdyke completed her famous 1,000 mile walk in Laisterdyke.

== See also ==
- Listed buildings in Bradford (Bradford Moor Ward)
- Laisterdyke Leadership Academy
