= Pedestrian =

Person traveling on foot

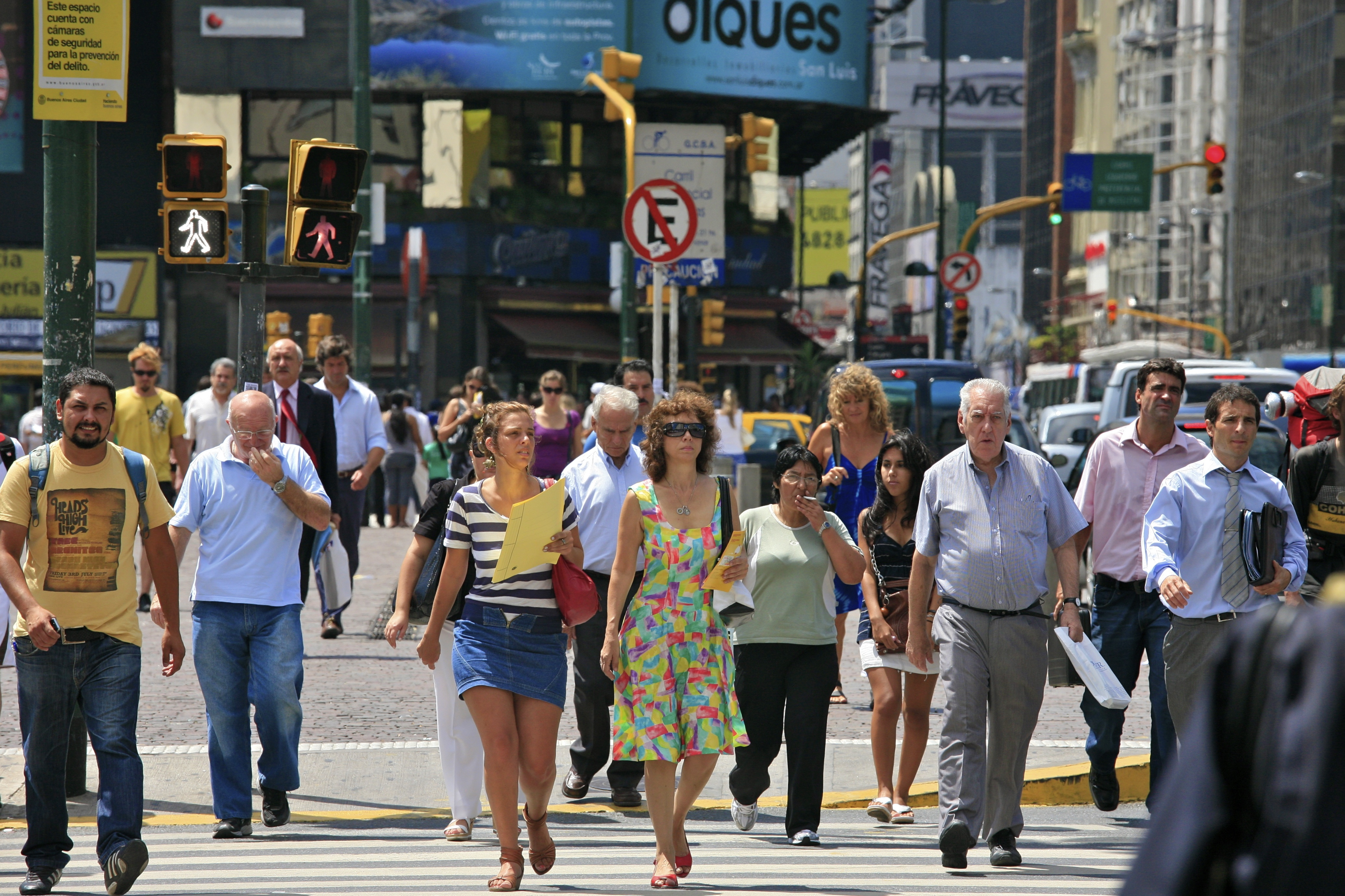
Pedestrians on a crosswalk in Buenos Aires in 2011

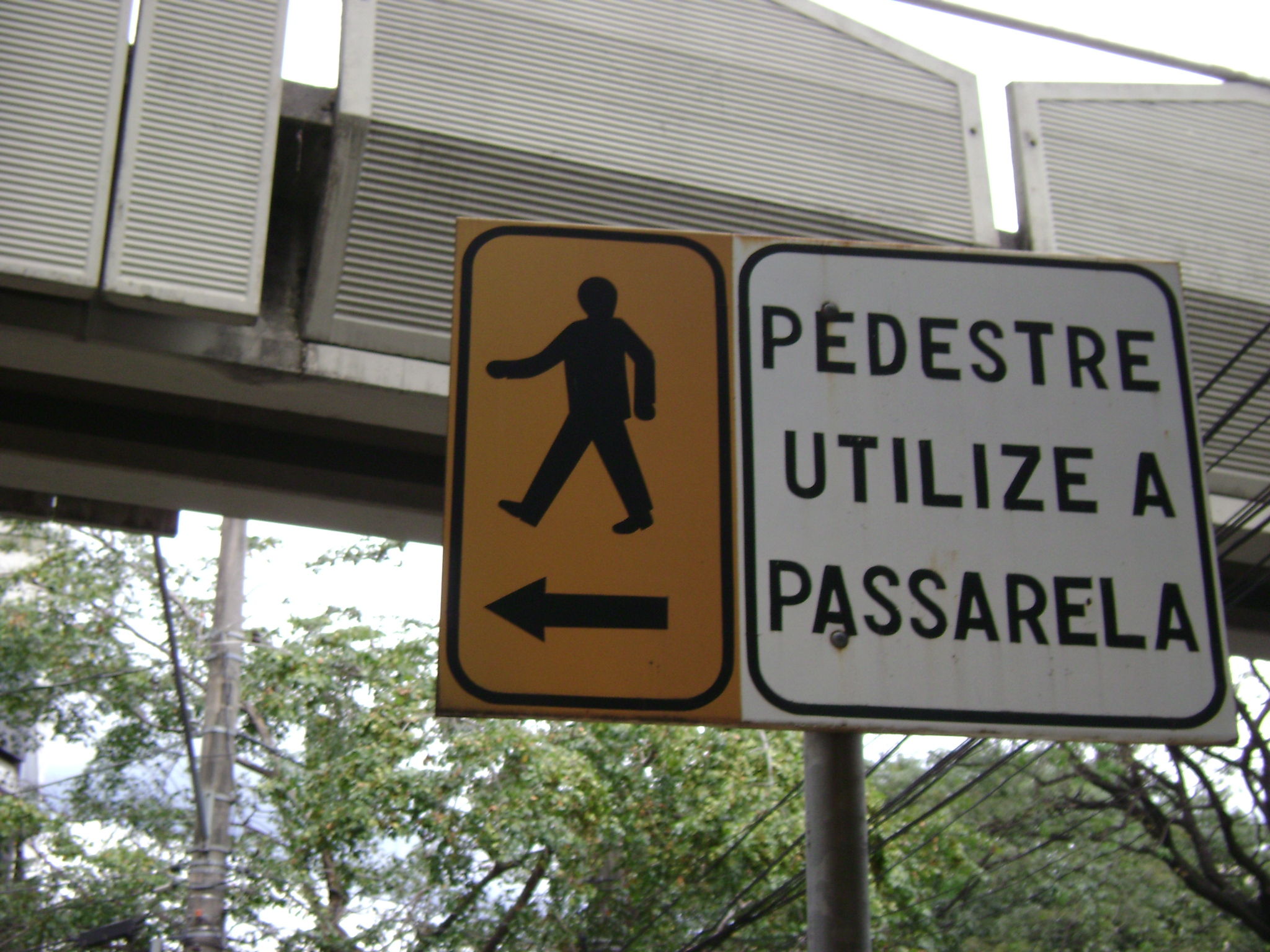
A sign in Belo Horizonte, Brazil, directing pedestrians to an overpass for safe crossing.

A pedestrian is a person traveling on foot (walking or running), by wheelchair or with other mobility aids. Streets and roads often have a designated footpath for pedestrian traffic, called the sidewalk in North American English, the pavement in British English, and the footpath in Australian, Indian and New Zealand English. There are also footpaths not associated with thoroughfares; these include rural paths and urban short cuts.

Historically, walking has been the main way people get around. In the early use of the word, pedestrian meant a "professional walker", or somebody who held a record for speed or endurance. With the advent of cars, it started to be used as an opposite: somebody who is not riding or driving.

As walking is a healthy and sustainable mode of transport, there are efforts to make cities more walkable. For instance, by creating wider sidewalks, a pedestrian network, or restricting motor vehicles in city centres. Pedestrians are vulnerable and can be injured, for example when crossing thoroughfares. The rise of SUVs has decreased safety for pedestrians.

== Etymology ==
The meaning of pedestrian is displayed with the morphemes ped- ('foot') and -ian ('characteristic of'). This word is derived from the Latin term pedester ('going on foot') and was first used (in the English language) during the 18th century. In its early usage, it often referred to a "professional walker", or somebody who held a notable record for speed. When cars came into common use, pedestrian started to be used in its current meaning, as somebody who is not driving or riding. Nowadays a pedestrian is a person traveling on foot, by wheelchair or with other mobility aids.

It was originally used, and can still be used today, as an adjective meaning plain or dull. The word pedestrian may have been used in middle French in the Recueil des Croniques et Anchiennes Istories de la Grant Bretaigne.

== History ==
Throughout history, walking has been the main way people get around. The first humans to migrate from Africa, about 60,000 years ago, walked. They walked along the coast of India to reach Australia. They walked across Asia to reach the Americas, and from Central Asia into Europe.

With the advent of cars at the beginning of the 20th century, the main story is that the cars took over, and "people chose the car", but there were many groups and movements that held on to walking as their preferred means of daily transport and some who organised to promote walking, and to counterbalance the widely-held view that often favoured cars, e.g. as related by Peter Norton.

During the 18th and 19th centuries, pedestrianism (walking) was non a popular spectator sport, just as equestrianism (riding) still is in places. One of the most famous pedestrians of that period was Captain Robert Barclay Allardice, known as "The Celebrated Pedestrian", of Stonehaven in Scotland. His most impressive feat was to walk 1 mile (1.6 km) every hour for 1000 hours, which he achieved between 1 June and 12 July 1809. This captured many people's imagination, and around 10,000 people came to watch over the course of the event. During the rest of the 19th century, many people tried to repeat this feat, including Ada Anderson who developed it further and walked a half-mile (800 m) each quarter-hour over the 1000 hours.

Since the 20th century, interest in walking as a sport has dropped. Racewalking is still an Olympic sport, but fails to catch public attention as it did. However major walking feats are still performed, such as the Land's End to John o' Groats walk in the United Kingdom, and the traversal of North America from coast to coast. The first person to walk around the world was Dave Kunst who started his walk traveling east from Waseca, Minnesota on 20 June 1970 and completed his journey on 5 October 1974, when he re-entered the town from the west. These feats are often tied to charitable fundraising and are undertaken, among others, by celebrities such as Sir Jimmy Savile and Ian Botham.

== Footpaths and roads ==
=== Outdoor pedestrian networks ===
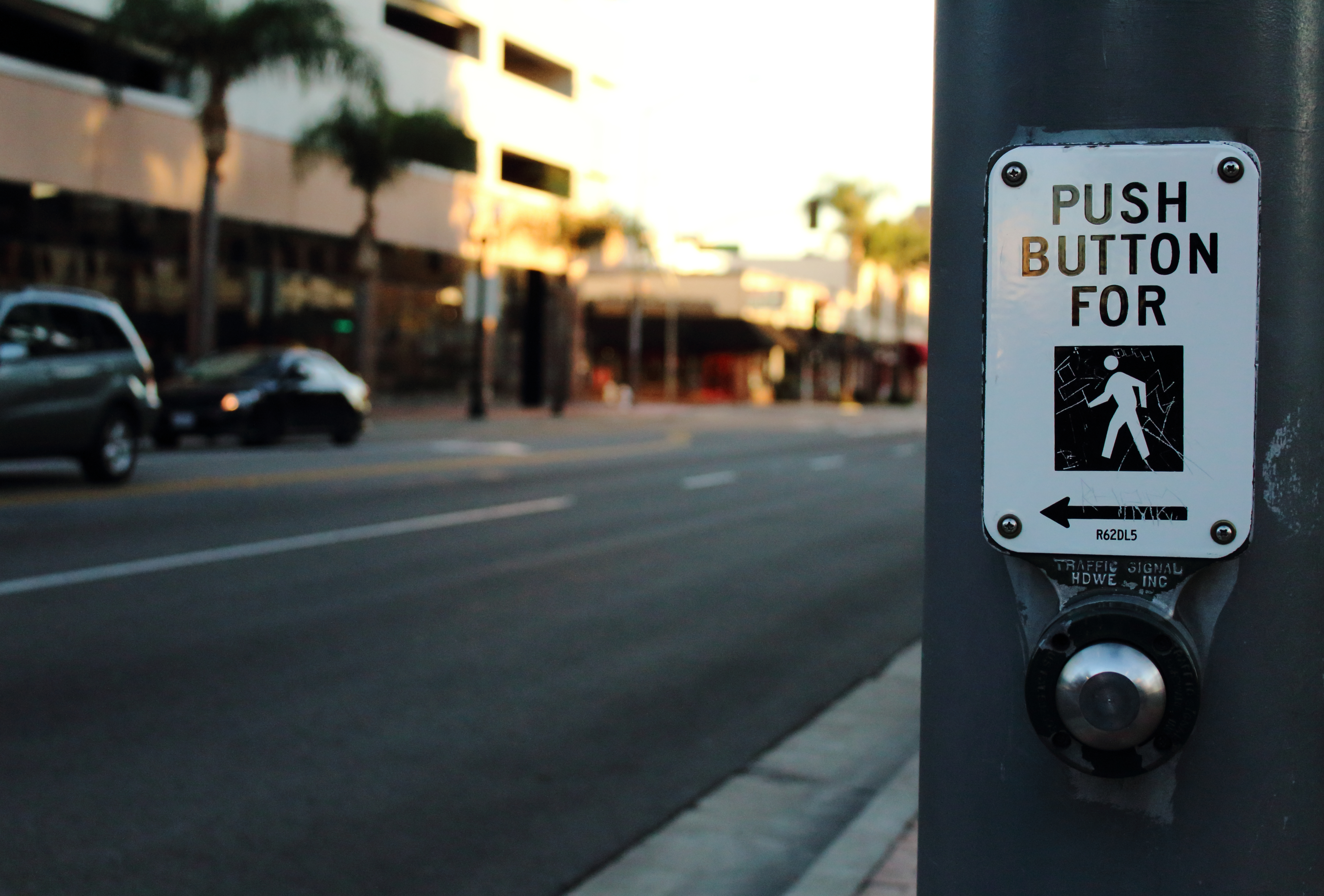
Pedestrian signal in Santa Ana, California.

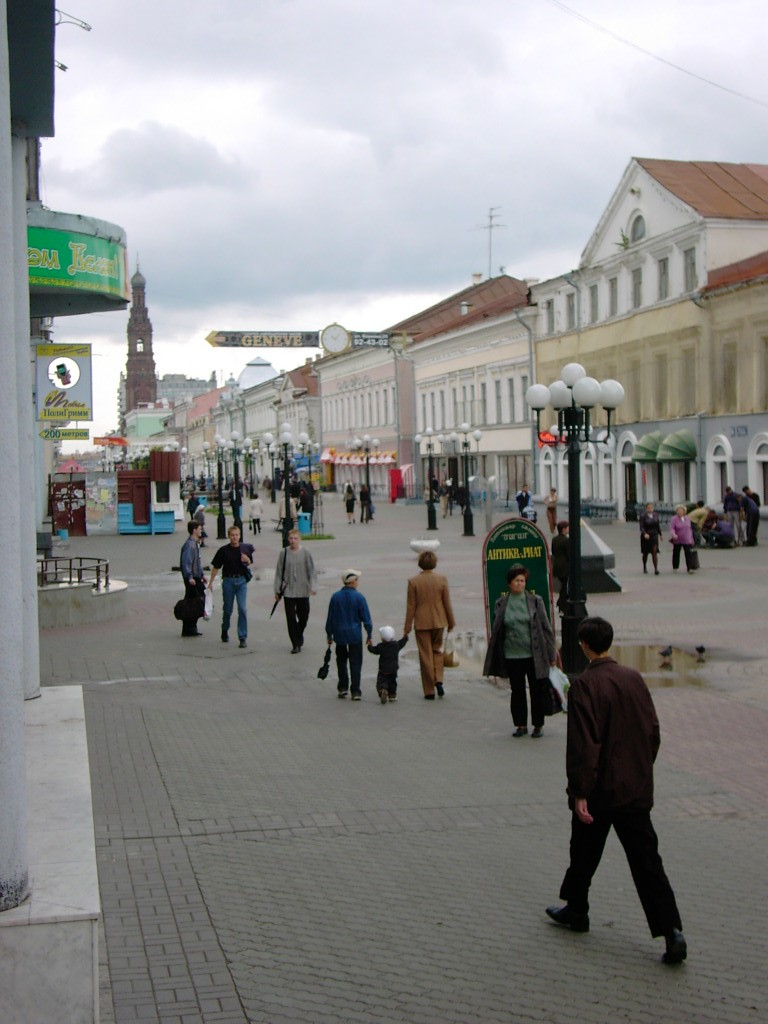
The pedestrian Bauman Street in Kazan, Russia.

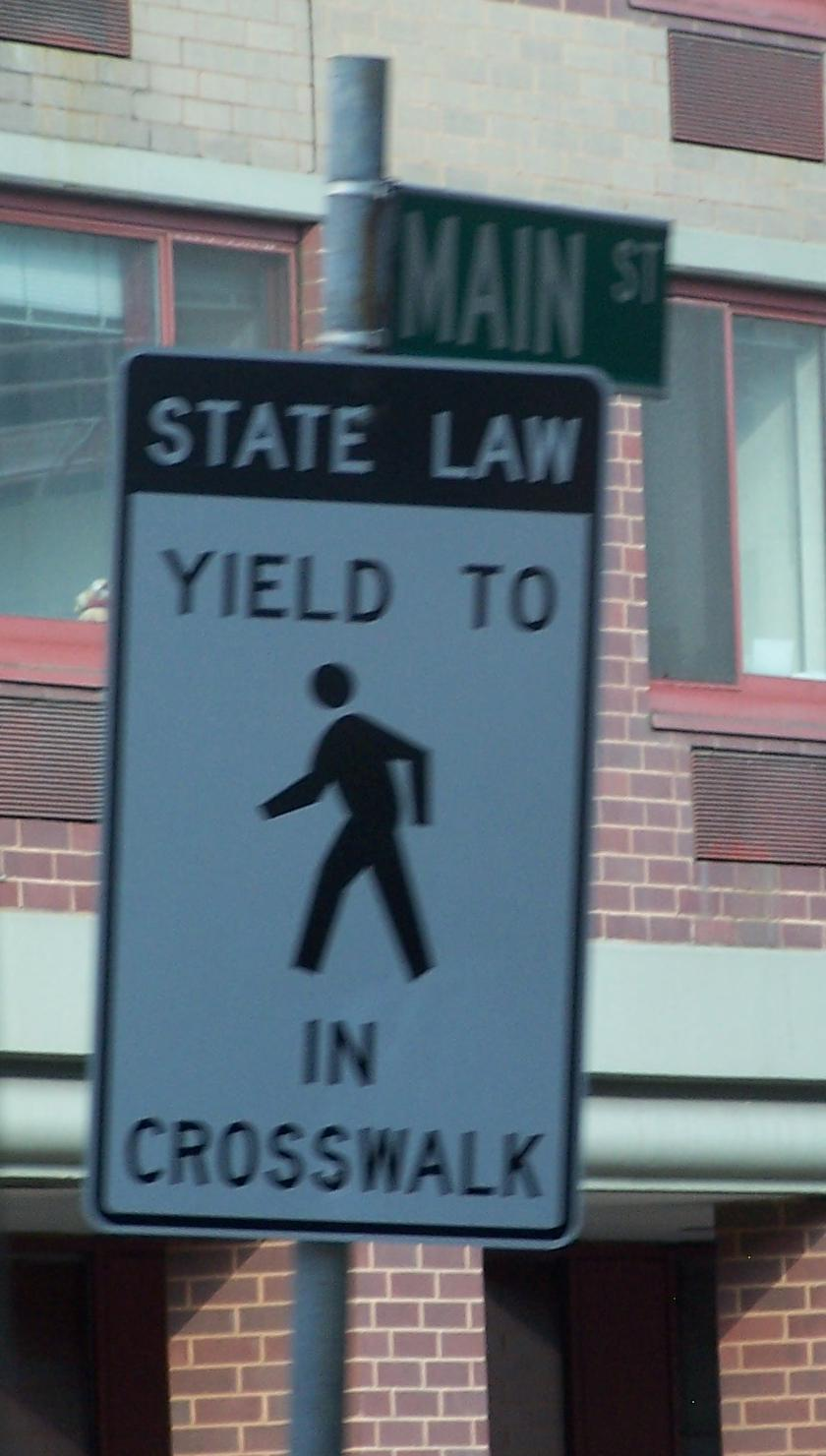
In many jurisdictions in the United States, one must yield to a pedestrian in a crosswalk.

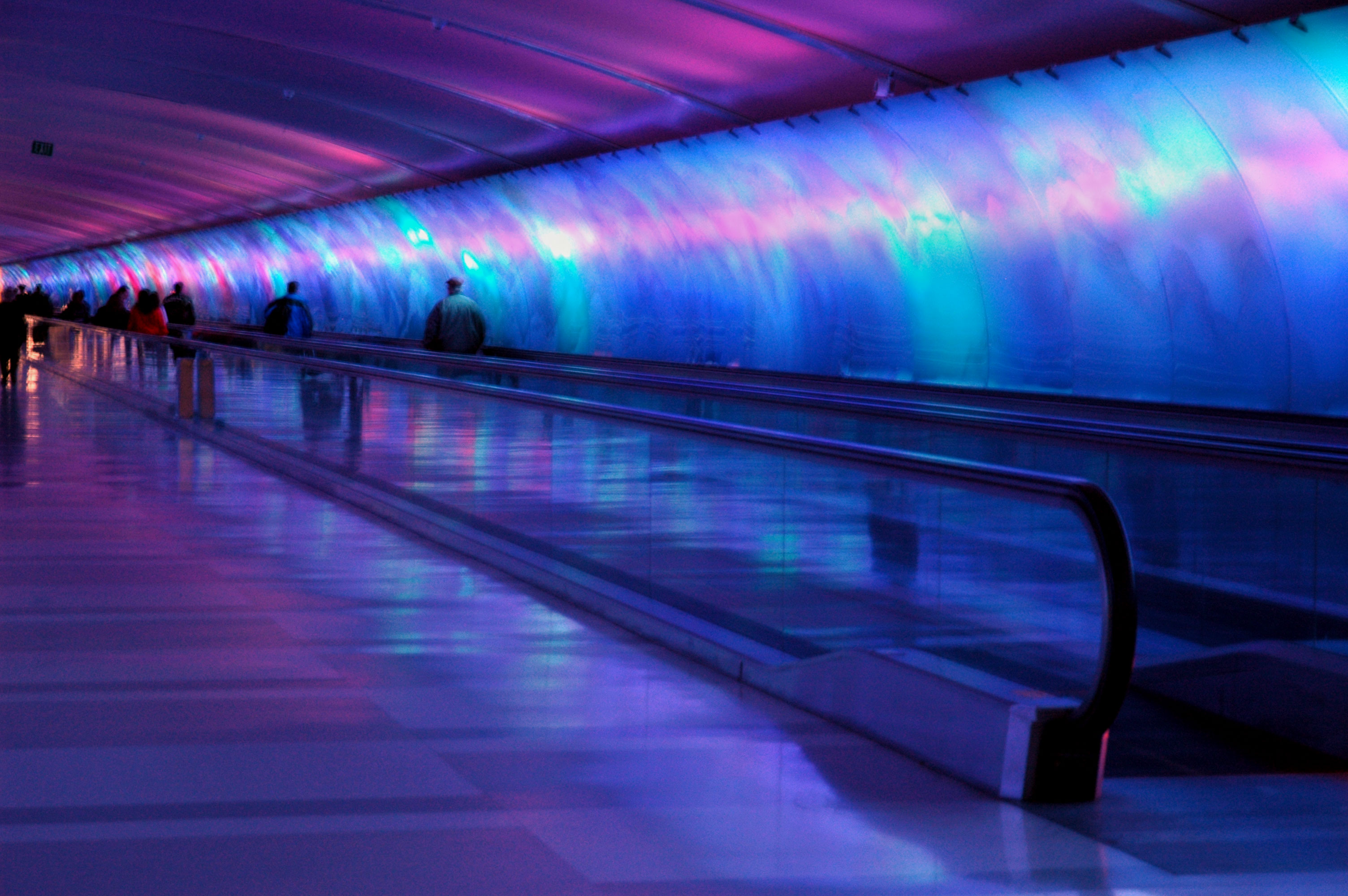
Colorful pedestrian Light Tunnel at Detroit's DTW airport, United States.

Roads often have a designated footpath for pedestrian traffic, called the sidewalk in North American English, the pavement in British English, and the footpath in Australian and New Zealand English. There are also footpaths not associated with a road; these include urban short cuts and also rural paths used mainly by ramblers, hikers, or hill-walkers. Footpaths in mountainous or forested areas may also be called trails. Pedestrians share some footpaths with horses and bicycles: these paths may be known as bridleways. Other byways used by walkers are also accessible to vehicles. There are also many roads with no footpath. Some modern towns (such as the new suburbs of Peterborough in England) are designed with the network of footpaths and cycle paths almost entirely separate from the road network.

The term trail is also used by the authorities in some countries to mean any footpath that is not attached to a road or street. If such footpaths are in urban environments and are meant for both pedestrians and pedal cyclists, they can be called shared use paths or multi-use paths in general and official usage.

Some shopping streets are for pedestrians only. Some roads have special pedestrian crossings. A bridge solely for pedestrians is a footbridge.

In Britain, regardless of whether there is a footpath, pedestrians have the legal right to use most public roads, excluding motorways and some toll tunnels and bridges such as the Blackwall Tunnel and the Dartford Crossing — although sometimes it may endanger the pedestrian and other road users. The UK Highway Code advises that pedestrians should walk in the opposite direction to oncoming traffic on a road with no footpath.

=== Indoor pedestrian networks ===
Indoor pedestrian networks connect the different rooms or spaces of a building. Airports, museums, campuses, hospitals and shopping centres might have tools allowing for the computation of the shortest paths between two destinations. Their increasing availability is due to the complexity of path finding in these facilities. Different mapping tools, such as OpenStreetMap, are extending to indoor spaces.

== Walkability ==
As walking is a healthy and sustainable mode of transport, there are efforts to make cities more walkable. For instance, by creating wider sidewalks or pavements, a pedestrian network, or restricting motor vehicles in city centres. Pedestrianisation is a process of removing motor traffic from city streets or restricting motor access to streets for use by pedestrians, to improve the environment and safety.

Efforts are under way to restore pedestrian access to new developments, especially to counteract newer developments, 20% to 30% of which in the United States do not include footpaths. Some activists advocate large pedestrian zones where only pedestrians, or pedestrians and some non-motorised vehicles, are allowed. Many urbanists have extolled the virtues of pedestrian streets in urban areas. In the US, the proportion of households without a car is 8%, but a notable exception is New York City, the only locality in the United States where more than half of all households do not own a car (the figure is even higher in Manhattan, over 75%).

The use of cars for short journeys is officially discouraged in many parts of the world, and construction or separation of dedicated walking routes in city centres receives a high priority in many large cities in Western Europe, often in conjunction with public transport enhancements. In Copenhagen, the world's longest pedestrian shopping area, Strøget, has been developed over the last 40 years, principally due to the work of Danish architect Jan Gehl, a principle of urban design known as copenhagenisation.

== Safety ==
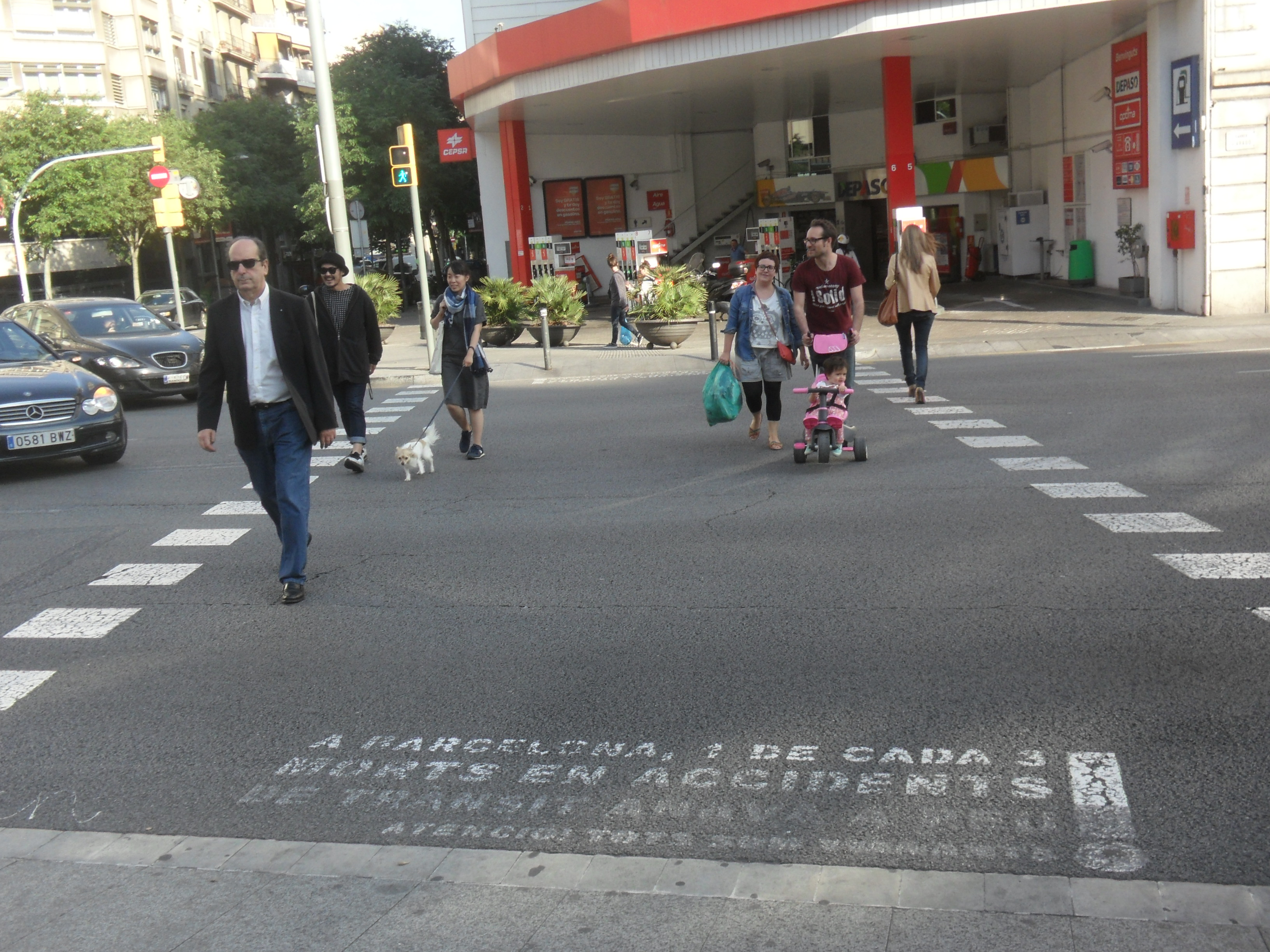
Pedestrian safety message crosswalk stencil

Improving the safety of pedestrians is an important issue. 300,000 people are killed each year due to being hit by road vehicles. The World Health Organization states that road traffic crashes are not inevitable; they are both predictable and preventable. Urban mobility policy and planning sometimes neglects walking.

Responsibility for pedestrian safety is historically contested. The idea that pedestrians are partially or wholly at fault for their injury by motorists arose in the early 20th century at least in part due to propaganda campaigns by auto lobbying groups. In some jurisdictions, these groups managed to criminalize a large category of pedestrian behaviors by introducing the concept of jaywalking.

== Health benefits and environment ==
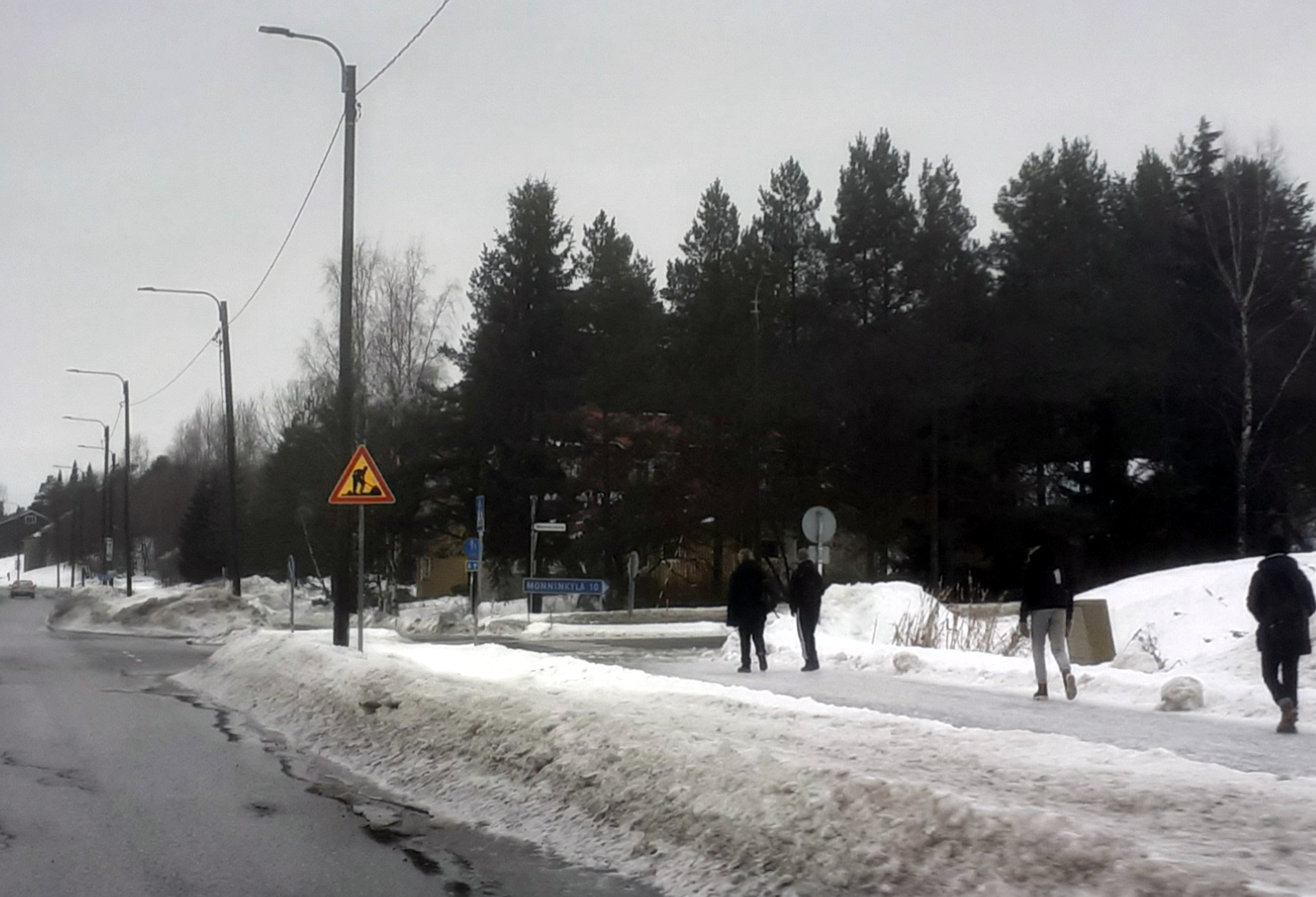
Pedestrians walking in winter conditions in Pornainen, Finland.

Regular walking is important both for human health and for the natural environment. Frequent exercise such as walking tends to reduce the chance of obesity and related medical problems. In contrast, using a car for short trips tends to contribute both to obesity and via vehicle emissions to climate change: internal combustion engines are more inefficient and highly polluting during their first minutes of operation (engine cold start). General availability of public transportation encourages walking, as it will not, in most cases, take one directly to one's destination.

== Unicode ==
In Unicode, the hexadecimal code for "pedestrian" is 1F6B6. In XML and HTML, the string &#x1F6B6; produces 🚶.

== See also ==
- Dérive – aimless walking usually through city streets
- Footpath
- Jaywalking
- Junior safety patrol
- List of U.S. cities with most pedestrian commuters
- Pedestrian village
- Pedestrian zone
- Street reclamation
- Traffic calming
- Trail ethics
- Walkability
- Walking audit
- Walking
