= A6177 road =

Road in England

Coordinates: 53.8075°N 1.7631°W

A6177

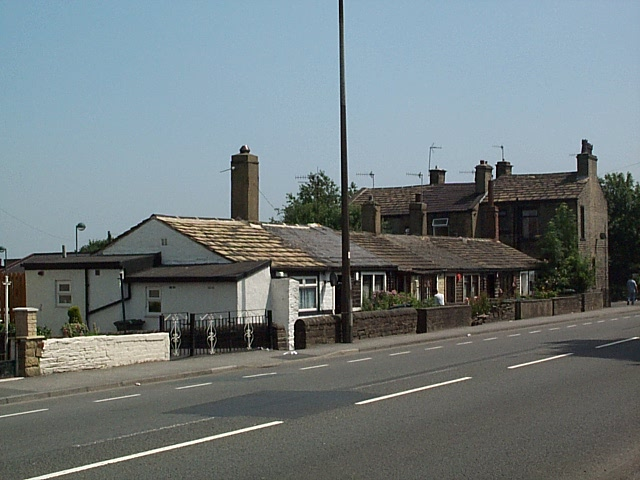
- On Southfield Lane to the southwest of the city

Route information
- Length: 9.47 mi (15.24 km)

Major junctions
- Orbital around Bradford
- M606 A647 A650 A658 A6036 A6037 A6176

Location
- Country: United Kingdom

Road network
- Roads in the United Kingdom; Motorways; A and B road zones

The A6177 is a ring road around Bradford in West Yorkshire, England. It is mostly formed from existing roads and save for its southern section is single-carriageway.

== Route description ==
Starting at Undercliffe going clockwise from the east of the junction of the A658 Otley Road, it heads south along the single carriageway Northcote Road and Killinghall Road through Bradford Moor before crossing the B6381 Bradford to Thornbury road at Habib's Restaurant, the former Barrack Tavern public house. The next major junction is at Laisterdyke with the A647 Leeds Road, which it meets for the first time. Just after crossing the A647, it passes over the Leeds to Bradford railway line and continues via Sticker Lane to Dudley Hill roundabout, an elevated junction with sliproad connections to and from the A650 Wakefield Road.

At Dudley Hill, the road turns west and becomes the dual carriageway Rooley Lane. The next roundabout is Bierley which connects with an Asda supermarket and the Bierley housing estate and is slightly unusual by featuring a cut-through for clockwise traffic. Continuing westwards is the elevated Staygate roundabout which connects with the M606 spur of the M62, and the A6036 to Stump Cross near Halifax. From the M606 clockwise traffic negotiates Staygate roundabout into Mayo Avenue while anticlockwise traffic is diverted past the roundabout to the end of the M606 up a slip road which was once part of Birch Lane into the ring road.

At Staygate the road heads north along Mayo Avenue and crosses the A641 Huddersfield to Bradford road at Manchester Road. There was once a roundabout at this point, but it was replaced by a large signal-controlled junction in 2004 to improve traffic flows. From Manchester Road it becomes a single carriageway again and run along Smiddles Lane, Southfield Road, Southfield Lane and Hudson Avenue through Little Horton to Cross Lane traffic lights at Great Horton where the A647 is met for the second time.

From Cross Lane the A647 joins with the ring road as it turns east along Great Horton Road towards Horton Grange crossing the trackbed of the old Bradford-Queensbury/Halifax/Keighley railway at the junction with Park Avenue. At Horton Grange, the A647 turns east onto All Saints Road while the ring road turns North West along Horton Grange Road. It continues via Ingleby Road, passing the former headquarters of Grattan which were demolished in January 2012 and across Bradford Beck to Girlington. At Girlington there is the Victoria shopping centre before the junction of the B6145 Thornton Road. At this point the road turns east along Whetley Lane, crosses the B6144 Bradford to Haworth road and heads into Manningham via Marlborough Road and Carlisle Road.

At Manningham the road meets the A650 for the second time before heading down Queen's Road and across the Bradford to Shipley railway. The ring road crosses Canal Road, the A6037 via a stone bridge which at one time went over the old Bradford Canal. From this there are views for anti-clockwise traffic of Lister's Mill on the right and the Valley Parade football ground. After the junction with King's Road the route joins Bolton Road for 140 feet (43 m) before turning right into Lister Lane, where the A6176 road starts. Along Lister Lane the route follows the northern edge of Peel Park, home of the famous Bradford Mela, before returning to Undercliffe.

The road forms the boundary of Bradford's Clean Air Zone on its western, southern and eastern sides.

== A6177 in Blackburn ==
From the late 1990s until 2005, there was a duplicate road numbered A6177 in Lancashire. This was a road between Blackburn and Haslingden, which had formerly been numbered B6232. It has partly reverted to its old number, with the remainder, at the Blackburn end, being renumbered as the A6077.
