= George Wilson (race walker) =

English competitive walker

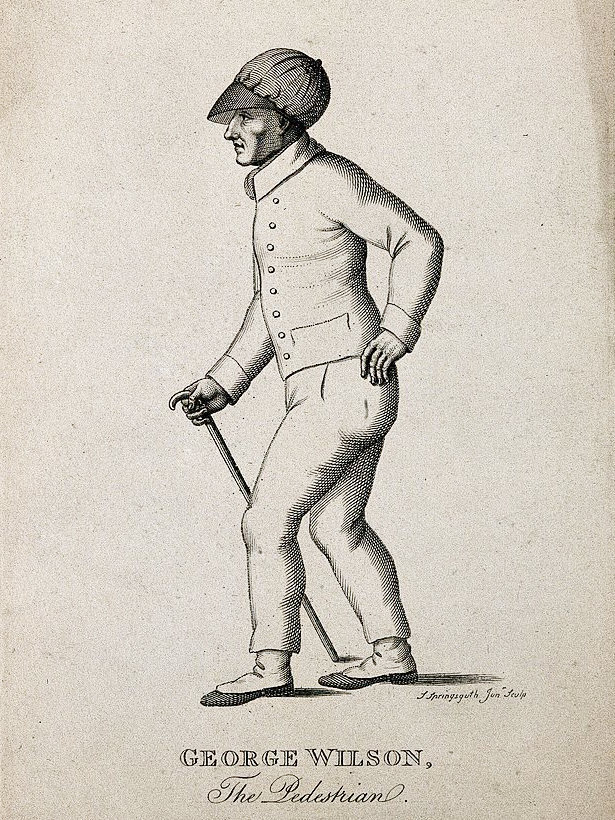
George Wilson

George Wilson (24 June 1766 – 14 April 1839), known also as the Blackheath Pedestrian, was a Newcastle-born competitive walker.

== Life ==
George Wilson was born in Newcastle on 24 June 1766, one of six children of shipbuilder Robert Wilson and Mary, née Finlay. When Wilson was young, his father died £200 in debt, forcing his mother to start a pawn-broking business. The debt was eventually paid off with the help of a creditor who also assisted Mrs Wilson in accruing an additional £600. John Bell, the husband of Mrs Wilson's younger sister, attempted to claim these £600 for himself in addition to £200 which was left to Mrs Wilson in her mother's will. He was unsuccessful in both cases. George Wilson would go on to marry Bell's daughter, his cousin, with whom he had 5 children.

Wilson held several jobs throughout his life, first serving as an apprentice cobbler under his uncle, John Bell. He reluctantly took on this role for seven years until, at the age of 21, he became a pawn-broker in his mother's business. When he married John Bell's daughter, he left this business. Bell loaned Wilson £30 to start his own business, which was largely unsuccessful and lasted only two years. After that failure, Wilson returned to the pawn-broking business, now his own, for another nine years. After that, he became a draper and hosier which required him to visit London about 6 times a year, a 522 miles (840 km) journey he would always take on foot. During this time, he was also employed as a tax collector, which would sometimes require him to walk 5 to 60 miles (8.0 to 96.6 km) a day. In 1805, satisfied that his wife and children could manage his hosiery and drapery business, he began selling maps and other travel guides as he walked around the country, which had by then become the main occupancy of his time. By 1810, he became a seller of pamphlets in Kent, which would sometimes require him to walk 40 miles (64 km) a day. This proved to be inadequate at providing his expenses, and by 1814, Wilson was in debtor's prison for failure to pay a £20 debt from John Bell. There he made his first steps in the world of competitive pedestrianism, walking 50 miles (80 km) around the prison yard in 12 hours. He finished with 4 minutes 43 seconds to spare, winning £3 1s.

When he was released from prison, Wilson became a full time competitive walker, supplementing his meager income by selling books. His first competitive walk outside of prison began on 30 August 1814 and ended one day later. During this, he walked 96 miles (154 km) in 23 hours 31 minutes, probably earning him £100.

In September 1822, he earned the nickname "The Blackheath Pedestrian" after attempting to walk 1,000 miles (1,600 km) in 20 days.

On the Monday after Easter in 1822, Wilson walked 90 miles (140 km) in 24 hours at the Town Moor racecourse in Newcastle. He finished with 14 minutes left on the clock. The crowd did not offer much money.

On 23 July 1822, he attempted to walk 90 miles (140 km) in 24 hours at Alnwick racecourse.

On 11 August 1822, he was convicted of being a rogue and vagabond for abandoning his wife and sentenced to 3 months' hard labour.

On 26 April 1824, Wilson completed his final feat of pedestrianism at Alston, Cumbria, successfully walking 140 miles (230 km) in under 48 hours, despite having been "lame in one of his legs for three months past."

George Wilson died 14 April 1839 at New Pandon Street, New Castle. He was 73.

== The Blackheath Pedestrian ==
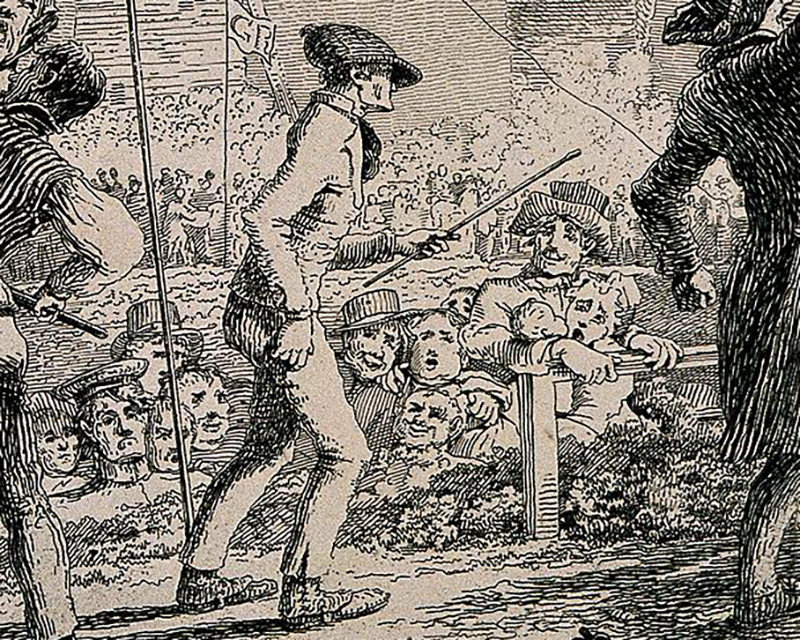
George Wilson on one of his famous walks

On 11 September 1815, the 50-year-old Wilson undertook his longest feat: walking 1,000 miles (1,600 km) around Blackheath, in 20 days for £100, to be collected from the people of Woolwich. Each day he walked 50 miles (80 km), averaging 4 miles per hour (6.4 km/h). He was ordered by the local magistrate to not walk on the Sabbath, so he was forced to leave their jurisdiction on the two Sundays on which he walked. Though for the first few days, he did not garner much attention, by the ninth day newspapers were writing about his walk and the crowd was at least 7,000 in size. In particular, his old age and small stature proved to be one of the factors which made his walk so appealing. The extra coverage given to him by the press only served to grow the crowds further. By the tenth day, they had become nearly unmanageable: the dust they were kicking up impaired Wilson's breathing and several disgruntled bettors tried to attack him. With an estimated £5,000 wagered on his success or downfall, men with bludgeons, staves, and bayonets were sent out to clear his path. By the 11th day, even The Times had begun to report on Wilson because this feat was considered even greater than Captain Barclay's 1,000 miles (1,600 km) in 1,000 hours (~40 days) walk six years earlier. Still, the local authorities were not pleased with the alcohol, prostitution, circus acts, and general nuisance which the riotous assembly had been causing, so they determined that the sale of alcohol was to be banned, and by the twelfth day the grounds were cleared of liquor stalls. On the thirteenth day, a Saturday, Wilson was notified that a warrant had been issued for his arrest, but was not executed due to sympathy from the clerk of the magistrate, on the condition that Wilson would absolutely not walk at Blackheath on Sunday. This was assured, and he was taken to Peckham, Surrey, to complete his walk on for day fourteen. Heavy rainfall made the ground unsuitable, so he was then taken to Beckenham, Kent instead. The continuing rain as well as the delays caused by it earlier meant that by midnight, 6 hours left in the 24 hours period, he had only completed 32 miles (51 km) for the day. Most doubted that he would be able to complete his walk for the day in the allowed time, with the odds assessed by the bookkeepers at 10:1. At 5:30 AM, he completed 50 miles (80 km) for the day, with 30 minutes left. On day fifteen, he completed 750 miles (1,210 km), 75% of his journey.

Thus far, the authorities had not looked upon Wilson's walk favorably. On 26 September 1815, just 1 mile (1.6 km) into his sixteenth day, Wilson was notified that the constables had been given the warrant for his arrest. Though he was eventually acquitted of disturbing the peace on 5 October 1815, the decision to arrest him proved to be effective: the crowds had all but dispersed. His inability to walk for the final 5 days resulted in his failure to complete the feat and he was unable to collect the £100 prize. However, the London Stock Exchange collected the same £100 for him within 2 hours.

On 2 November 1822, Wilson completed 1,000 miles (1,600 km) of walking in eighteen days in Hull.

== Record ==
Feats of Pedestrianism
Location	Distance	Date	Required time	Actual time
Newgate gaol, Newcastle	50 miles (80 km)	15 April 1813	00:12:00:00	00:11:55:17
Shooter's Hill, Kent	96 miles (154 km)	30–31 August 1814	01:00:00:00	00:23:32:00
Blackheath Common, Surrey	1,000 miles (1,600 km)	11 September–1 October 1815	20:00:00:00	Did not complete; arrested
Parker's Piece, Cambridge	100 miles (160 km)	23–24 May 1816	01:00:00:00	01:00:03:30
Prussia Gardens, Norwich	50 miles (80 km)	10 July 1816	00:12:00:00	00:11:45:00
Vauxhall Gardens, North Ferry, Yarmouth, Norfolk	100 miles (160 km)	1–2 August 1816	01:00:00:00	00:23:51:00
Lowestoft, Suffolk	50 miles (80 km)	9 August 1816	00:12:00:00	00:11:45:00
King's Lynn, Norfolk	250 miles (400 km)	August 1816	02:17:00:00	<02:17:00:00
Mr. Clarke's Ship Launch Inn, Hull	1,000 miles (1,600 km)	14 October–2 November 1816	18:00:00:00	17:23:19:10
Mr. Tinker's Vauxhall Gardens, Collyhurst	1,000 miles (1,600 km)	7–26 July 1817	18:00:00:00	<18:00:00:00
Bowling Green Tavern, Scotland Road, Liverpool	1,000 miles (1,600 km)	29 September–25 October 1817	18:00:00:00	Did not complete; audience too disruptive
Weymouth	50 miles (80 km)	9 March 1819	00:12:00:00	00:11:40:00
Newport, Isle of Wight	100 miles (160 km)	1 June 1819	01:02:00:00	01:01:55:00
Lewes, Sussex	300 miles (480 km)	20–25 June 1819	06:00:00:00	<06:00:00:00
Chelsea, Middlesex	1,000 miles (1,600 km)	Between 1819–1822	18:00:00:00	<18:00:00:00
Newcastle racecourse	90 miles (140 km)	8-9 April 1822	01:00:00:00	00:23:50:00
Tyne Green, Near Hexham	90 miles (140 km)	21-22 June 1822	01:00:00:00	00:23:52:00
Alston, Cumbria	140 miles (230 km)	26 April 1824	02:00:00:00	01:23:25:00

== In media ==
George Wilson wrote an autobiography entitled A Sketch of the Life of George Wilson, the Blackheath Pedestrian: Who Undertook to Walk One Thousand Miles in Twenty Days! which was illustrated by Thomas Charles Wageman in 1815. In this book he tells of his many exploits and failures, including him being arrested for causing a breach of the peace, charged and tried for "walking for money" and ending up in debtor’s prison.

In the song "On Russell The Pedestrian" which appeared in 1840 in The Tyne Songster, George Wilson is mentioned by name as a well-known competitive walker. The notes to the song mention the last feat of his walking career at Town Moor racecourse in Newcastle. The song itself is not written in a Geordie dialect, but has a strong Northern England connection.

“The Quizzical Quorum or the Fortunes and Misfortunes of the Black Beaks of Blackheath” and "Looney's visit to Blackheath" are both songs written about Wilson's 1,000 miles (1,600 km) walk around Blackhealth Common.
