= Thornbury, Bradford =

Area of Bradford, West Yorkshire, England

Coordinates: 53.798°N 1.711°W

Thornbury
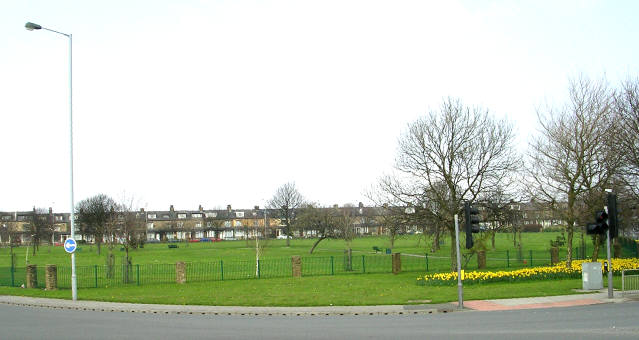
- Thornbury Roundabout, Thornbury

- Location within West Yorkshire
- OS grid reference: SE185336
- Metropolitan borough: City of Bradford
- Metropolitan county: West Yorkshire
- Region: Yorkshire and the Humber
- Country: England
- Sovereign state: United Kingdom
- Post town: BRADFORD
- Postcode district: BD3
- Dialling code: 01274
- Police: West Yorkshire
- Fire: West Yorkshire
- Ambulance: Yorkshire

Thornbury is an area of Bradford, in West Yorkshire, England on the border with the City of Leeds. Thornbury is located in the Bradford Moor ward and the Bradford East parliamentary constituency. Thornbury is contiguous with Pudsey – part of the City of Leeds - and borders Laisterdyke, and Fagley in Eccleshill ward.

== History ==
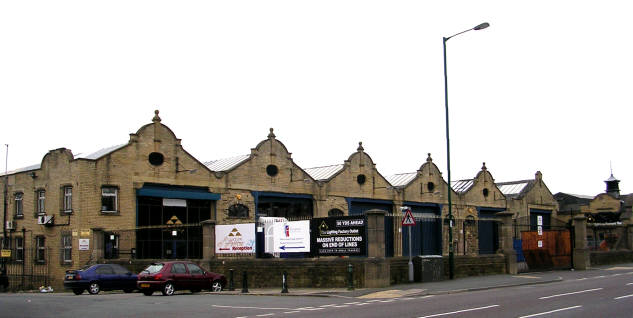
Former Thornbury tramsheds now demolished

Thornbury was originally a distinct village, in 1894 Thornbury became a civil parish, being formed from the part of the parish of Calverley with Farsley in the County Borough of Bradford, on 25 March 1898 the parish was abolished and merged with Bradford.

In the late 19th and early 20th century, Thornbury was the seat of various enterprises such as Crofts Engineering and John Sharp & Co textile manufacturing machine engineers and the Phoenix Dynamo Manufacturing Company. On Leeds Road there were some large former tramsheds and former bus depot dating from when Bradford had its own tram, trolleybus and bus services. Bradford Corporation Trams had their own works in Thornbury where over 150 tram cars were built.

Buffalo Bill staged a performance of his Wild West Show in Thornbury when touring England in 1903. The Kozey Picture Hall on Leeds Old Road was converted from a boxing stadium and gymnasium starting operation as a cinema in 1912. The cinema closed in 1920 principally due to competition from the larger Lyceum Cinema that opened in 1919 in nearby Laisterdyke, and became a weaving shed.

== Economy ==
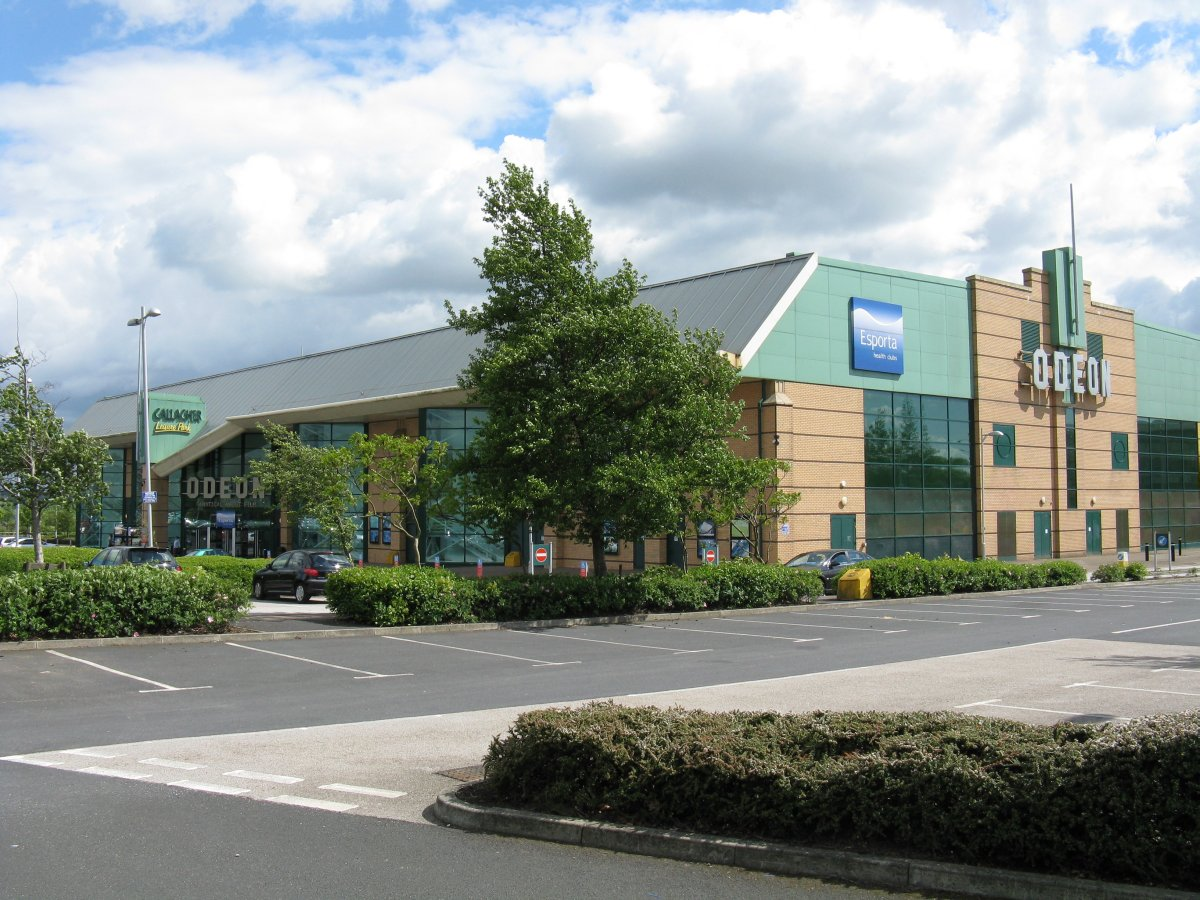
The Leeds Bradford Odeon multiplex cinema, Gallagher Leisure Park, Thornbury, Bradford.

On Gain Lane are British Bakeries' Hovis bakeries, and the headquarters of Wm Morrison Supermarkets.

Off Leeds Old Road in the Woodhall Retail Centre are supermarkets and the Thornbury Medical Centre. On Leeds Old Road is the Thornbury Centre - a conference centre, library and church opened in March 1999, built on the site of the demolished St. Margaret's Church with £1.19 million funding from the Millennium Commission. There is only one working public house remaining in Thornbury.

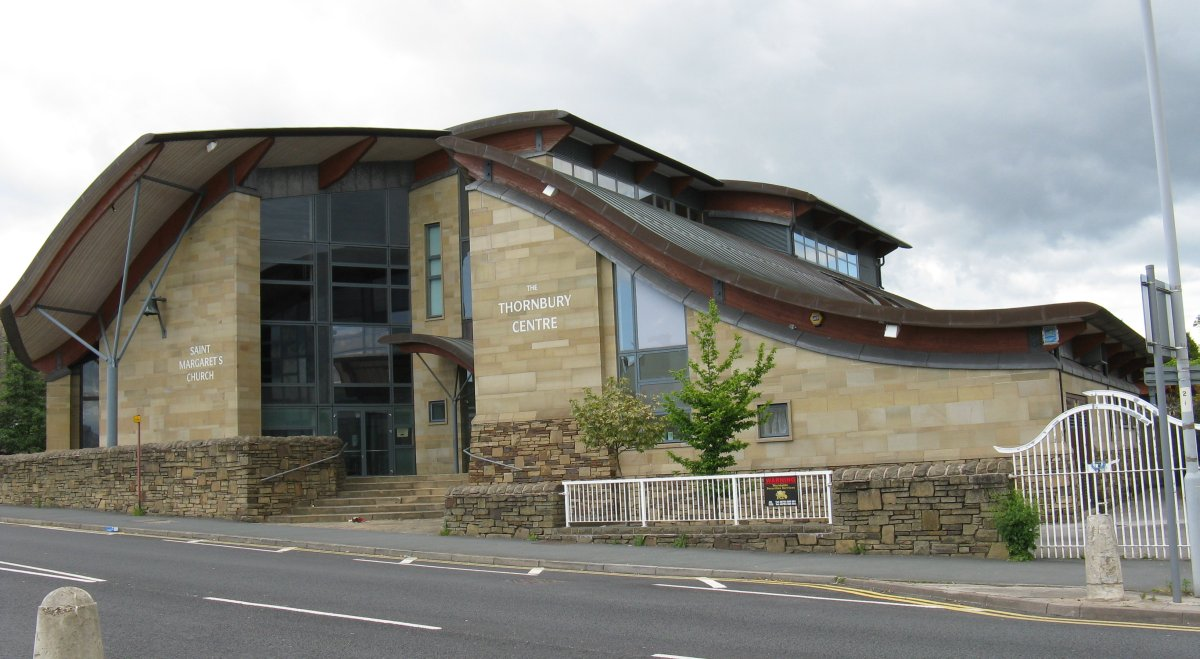
St. Margaret's Church and the Thornbury Centre, Leeds Old Road

On Dick Lane in the Gallagher Leisure Park is the Odeon Leeds-Bradford a 13 screen multiplex cinema.

== Education ==
On the edge of old Thornbury village is Laisterdyke Leadership Academy. Thornbury has a public lending library in the Thornbury Centre on Leeds Old Road.

== Transport ==
The main roads through the area are the A647 Leeds Road, the B6381 Leeds Old Road, Gain Lane and Dick Lane. Leeds Road, Leeds Old Road, and Dick Lane meet at Thornbury roundabout, the biggest roundabout in Yorkshire, where Leeds Road, Gipsy Street, and Dick Lane encircle a roughly triangular green space.

New Pudsey 1 mile (1.6 km) east is the nearest railway station.

Thornbury is served by First Bradford's 72, 508 (First Halifax), X11, 671 and X6 bus services and TLC Travel's 660 service.

== Sport ==
To the east of Thornbury is the Phoenix Park Golf Course.

Thornbury Trojans reached the national final of the Amateur Baseball Cup in 1937, along with Birmingham side Durex, a final that was never played.

== Notable people ==
The poet and novelist Joolz Denby lives in Thornbury.

== See also ==
- Listed buildings in Bradford (Bradford Moor Ward)
