= A650 road =

Road in Yorkshire, England

A650

Route information
- Length: 25 mi (40 km)

Major junctions
- West end: A629 road, Keighley
- A629 A6035 A657 A6038 A6177 A6181 A6037 A658 A647 A6177 A651; A58; A62 M62 M621 A643 A6029 A653 M62 A654; M1; A61
- East end: County Hall, Wakefield

Location
- Country: United Kingdom
- Primary destinations: Keighley, Bradford, Wakefield

Road network
- Roads in the United Kingdom; Motorways; A and B road zones

The A650 road is a main route through the West Yorkshire conurbation in England. The road goes from Keighley to Wakefield on a rough north west/south east axis for 25 miles (40 km). The route is mostly single carriageway with some dualled sections in the Aire Valley, Bradford and the approach to Wakefield from the M1.

Two sections of the A650 are designated as part of the Governments High Load Route; the section between Keighley and Saltaire and the section between the A58 on the Drighlington bypass and the Tingley roundabout.

== Settlements on the route ==
- Keighley
- Crossflatts
- Bingley
- Saltaire
- Shipley
- Bradford
- Dudley Hill
- Tong Street
- Gildersome Street
- Bruntcliffe
- Morley
- Tingley
- East Ardsley
- Carr Gate
- Wakefield

== Route description ==
The road begins at a roundabout with the A629 Skipton to Rotherham road in Keighley. The B6265 road (which was formerly the A629 until the bypass to Skipton was opened) also filters into the roundabout. The road heads south along the edge of Keighley town centre and is single carriageway until it intersects with the A6035 spur road heading south through the town. The road then becomes dual carriageway and arrives very quickly at the next roundabout with local roads in the Aireworth suburb of Keighley.

Hereafter the road is travelling in a south easterly direction through the Aire Valley towards Bingley. The route here has blue measured mile signs so that drivers can test their vehicles and odometers. The next roundabout is at Crossflatts before the road heads into Bingley and instead of bypassing the town, it goes through the very centre at the lowest point in the valley, before intersecting with the old A650 route at the Bankfield roundabout in Cottingley.

The road carries on through Nab Wood (where the eastbound side has a bus lane) to emerge at the improved roundabout at Saltaire and the junction with the A657. The road then carries on in a southerly direction through Saltaire village which merges seamlessly into Shipley town. Where the A6038 leaves the road at an acute angle of 45° to the east is known as "The Branch". The adjacent pub called The Branch was purchased by Bradford Council in 2018 to allow for its demolition in a £42 million scheme to improve the junction. The A650 road continues into Bradford, again with a bus lane on the southbound side (i.e. towards Bradford).

The road loses its Primary Route designation at the junction with A6177 (the outer ring road around Bradford) and then continues into Bradford and heads east at the junction with the A6181 and then south, where it meets the A6037 on a sharp 90° junction. It then functions as the inner ring road in Bradford, intersecting with the A658 and the A647 before leaving south eastwards with three lanes. It meets the A6177 again and regains its Primary Route designation but after the junction the route becomes single carriageway again.

At Tong cemetery, the A651 leaves to the right hand side and the road heads east before going south again on the Drighlington bypass section where it intersects with the A58. At Gildersome roundabout the road has a multiplex junction with the M62, M621 and the A62. The road loses its Primary Route designation and intersects with the A643 and the A6029 before arriving at another multiplex junction (Tingley roundabout) with the A653 and the M62 motorway.

The road continues eastwards with the A654 leaving to the left before it intersects with the M1 at junction 41. On the south side of the M1 the road reverts to dual carriageway towards Wakefield and it soon heads southwards where it intersects with the A61. The two roads run in tandem for 550 yards (500 m) before the A61 splits to the left. The A650 ends in Wakefield City Centre opposite the County Hall and adjacent to Wakefield College.

== Bypasses ==
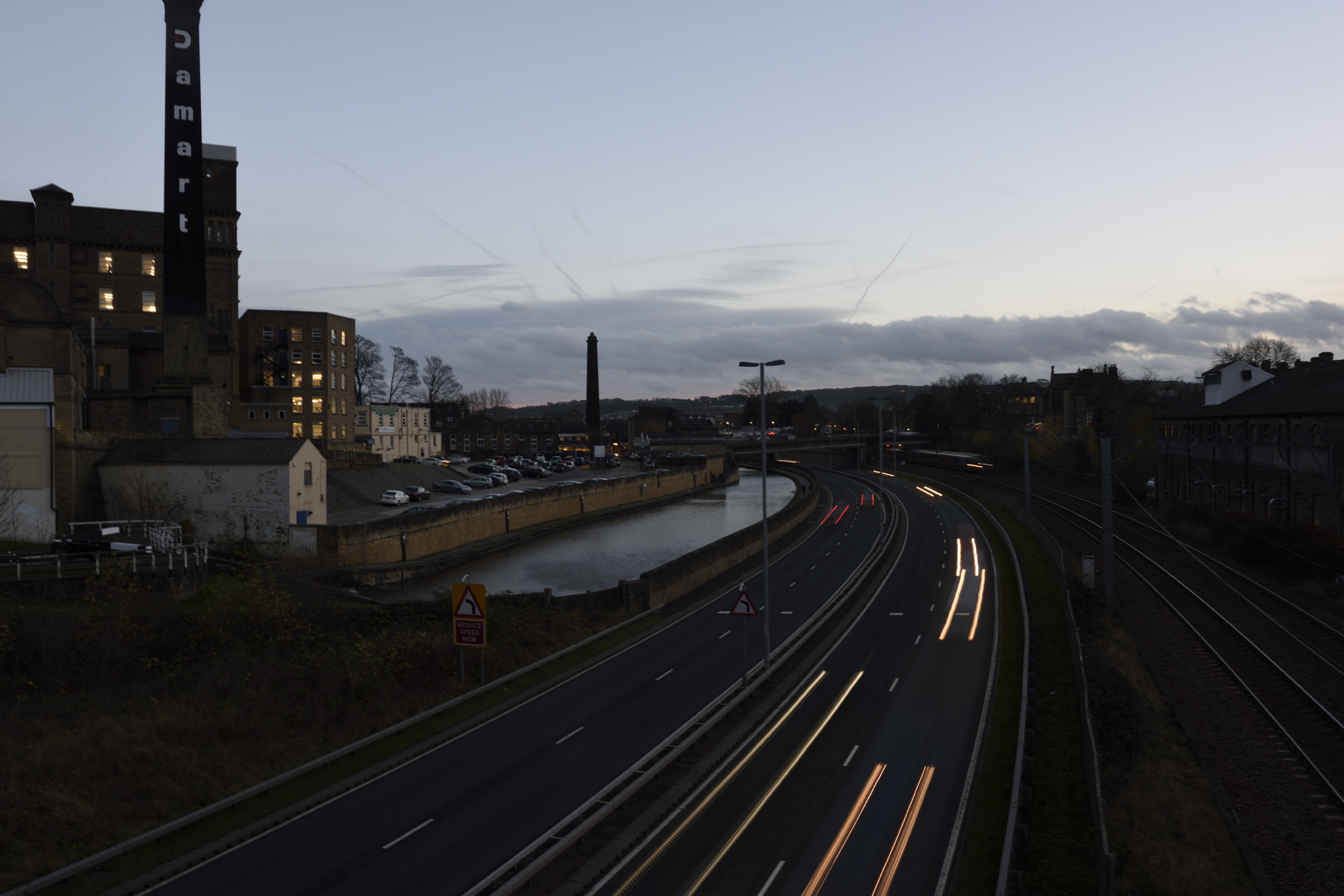
The A650 Aire Valley Trunk road in Bingley looking south. The canal was moved to the left in 1992 to allow the new road to be built.

The A650 has had many improvements made to the road, including several bypasses. The Keighley to Crossflatts bypass section was opened in 1988 and the Crossflatts to Cottingley section (known as the Bingley Bypass) was opened in 2003. The old course is now the B6265 road. The inner ring road in Bradford and Drighlington have been bypassed too. The Drighlington bypass is built on the former trackbed of the Leeds, Bradford and Halifax Junction Railway line from Bradford to Wakefield via Morley and opened to traffic in February 1991. A section of the new road is built on what used to be a tip in the 1980s. The industrial waste was left under the new road and a revolutionary concrete composite was used to build on top of the tip. There are vents still to be seen at either side of the road to aid the removal of methane

Sections of the A650 between Tong and the M62/M621 junction cut across the historic battlefield site of Adwalton Moor.

== Safety ==
In 2007, it was noted that of the seven worst accident blackspots in Leeds, four were on the A650 - Gildersome and Tingley Roundabouts, the Gelderd Road roundabout junction with the M62/M621 and the roundabout junction with the M1 at East Ardsley.

The section of road that goes through the Bradford Metropolitan District (Keighley to Birstall) was recently highlighted as being the worst road in the area for accidents. Between 2010 and 2014, 542 accidents occurred on this stretch of road alone.
