= Les Kellett =

English wrestler (1915–2002)

Personal information
- Born: Leslie Kellett; 11 May 1915 Laisterdyke, Bradford, West Riding of Yorkshire, England
- Died: 9 January 2002 (aged 86) Ilkley, West Yorkshire, England

Professional wrestling career
- Ring name: Les Kellet
- Billed from: Bradford, England
- Trained by: Joe Hill
- Retired: 1984

Leslie Kellett (11 May 1915 – 9 January 2002) was an English professional wrestler who rose to prominence due to the popularity of televised wrestling in the 1960s and 1970s. He was born in Laisterdyke, Bradford, West Riding of Yorkshire, the son of Bill Kellett, an engineer, and Sarah Kellett.

Les was an engineer in the merchant navy and was demobbed in Manchester, where a meeting with Joe Hill led him to consider life as a professional wrestler. During the 1950s he earned £50 a week, wrestling nationwide. In the 1960s Kellett was nominated for ITV's Sports Personality of the Year and met Prince Philip in the 1970s.

In the 1970s, he could regularly be seen on ITV's Saturday afternoon sports show-case, World of Sport. Although well known for his comic antics he was respected and feared in equal measure by his fellow professionals and was regarded as one of the toughest opponents in the sport. One of his standard tactics was to appear punch-drunk and almost defeated in a match, before suddenly recovering his ability and delivering the decisive move.

The money he earned from his wrestling appearances was not considerable and he supplemented his earnings by working a small holding and café called "The Terminus" in Thornton, West Yorkshire, where trolleybuses terminated before returning to Bradford, with his wife Margaret. On 2 acres (0.81 ha) behind the house Kellett sometimes bred pigs and once said he kept fifty head of cattle. Although not seen in televised action after the 1970s, he is still fondly remembered as one of its most endearing characters.

Kellett died in a nursing home in Ilkley at the age of 86. He was survived by Margaret, a son, Christopher, and two grandchildren. His other son, David Barrie, himself a wrestler, predeceased him.
