= M606 motorway =

Motorway in England

M606
- M606 highlighted in blue

Route information
- Maintained by National Highways
- Length: 3 mi (4.8 km)
- Existed: 1972–present
- History: Completed in 1973, northern terminus reconstructed in 2004

Major junctions
- South end: Cleckheaton
- J1 → M62 motorway
- North end: Bradford

Location
- Country: United Kingdom

Road network
- Roads in the United Kingdom; Motorways; A and B road zones
← M602	→ M621

The M606 is a 3-mile-long (5 km) stretch of motorway in West Yorkshire, England. Called the Bradford Spur motorway, the M606 leaves the M62 motorway at junction 26, near Cleckheaton, and heads into Bradford, to join the A6177 Bradford Ring Road. It is officially named the "Bradford South Radial Motorway" and was opened in 1973.

== Route ==
The northern end of the M606, closest to the city, was built with a large raised roundabout crossing the Bradford Ring Road, but the original plans to continue the motorway under the roundabout were not carried out: access was only by slip roads to and from the roundabout.

In 1999, a new slip road was built that allowed eastward traffic on the ring road, via a mini-roundabout, to enter the motorway directly and avoid the Staygate roundabout.

In 2004, the junction was further remodelled, so that traffic leaving the motorway and wishing to turn eastward on the ring road continues under the roundabout, and round to join the roundabout from the opposite site, so that it has a left rather than a right turn to make (via two sets of traffic lights).

Staygate roundabout is very close to Odsal Stadium, the home of the rugby league club Bradford Bulls.

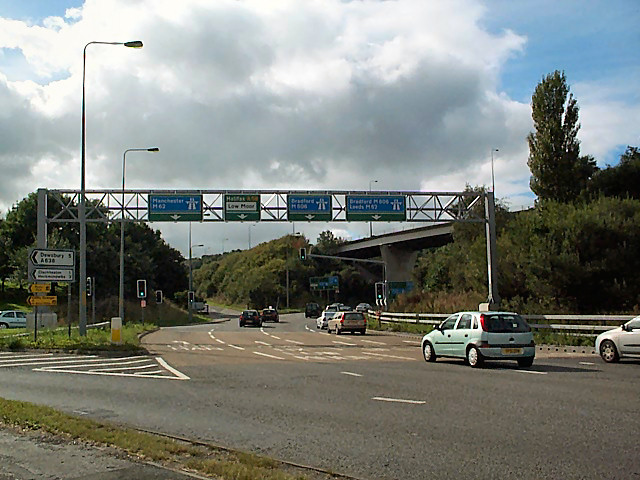
Chain Bar roundabout.

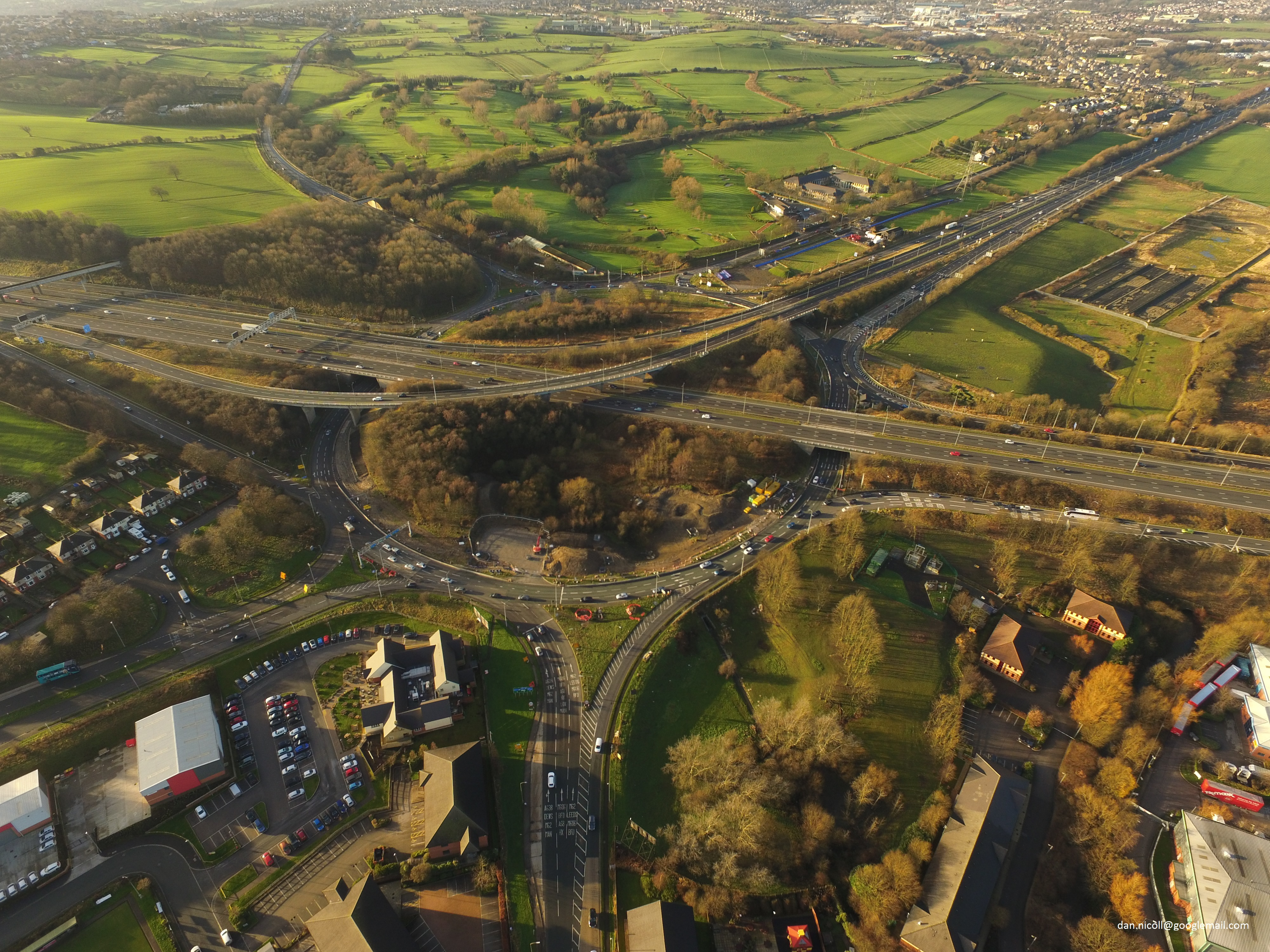
Chain Bar Roundabout from above.

The southerly junction with the M62 is known as the Chain Bar Interchange and features free-flowing sliproads from the Manchester direction M62 traffic to Bradford, but not the Leeds direction, which has to use the complex traffic-light controlled roundabout.

In 2007, work started on the M606 to create the UK's first motorway carpool lane (also known as high-occupancy vehicle or HOV lane). The 1-mile (1.6 km) lane scheme was on the M606 southbound and allowed vehicles with more than one person in the car a fast track onto the M62 eastbound at Junction 26. In August 2017 the lane's restriction was removed and is now open to all traffic.

In September 2016, it was revealed that the M606 is the slowest part of the motorway network averaging 24.6 miles per hour (39.6 km/h).

== Junctions ==
M606 motorway junctions
County	Location	mi	km	Junction	Destinations	Notes
West Yorkshire	Bradford	0	0	1 (Note: 53.7366°N 1.7264°W)	M62 - Manchester, Leeds; A58 - Leeds, Halifax A638 - Cleckheaton, Wakefield	
West Yorkshire	Bradford	1.5	2.4	2 (Note: 53.7557°N 1.7423°W)	Oakenshaw, Low Moor	No northbound entrance
West Yorkshire	Bradford	2.4	3.9	3 (Note: 53.7685°N 1.7494°W)	A6036 - Halifax A6177 - Bradford	
1.000 mi = 1.609 km; 1.000 km = 0.621 mi: Incomplete access

*Ceremonial Counties

Coordinate list
