= Listed buildings in Bradford (Bradford Moor Ward) =

Bradford Moor is a ward in the metropolitan borough of the City of Bradford, West Yorkshire, England. It contains six listed buildings that are recorded in the National Heritage List for England. All the listed buildings are designated at Grade II, the lowest of the three grades, which is applied to "buildings of national importance and special interest". The ward is to the east of the centre of Bradford, and includes the districts of Laisterdyke and Thornbury. It is mainly residential, and the listed buildings consist of a farmhouse and farm buildings, a chaplaincy (presbytery) with an attached stable block and coach house, a former Sunday school, and two rows of terraced cottages.

== Buildings ==
Name and location	Photograph	Date	Notes
Gain Lane Farmhouse, barn and stables 53.80343°N 1.70390°W		Early to mid 18th century	Two cottages, later combined, with an attached barn, stables and cart sheds. They are in stone, with stone slate roofs and two storeys, and form a U-shaped plan. The house has two bays, a doorway with monolithic jambs, blocked doorways with tie-stone jambs, and mullioned windows. The barn has three bays, and contains a segmental-arched cart entry with composite jambs and a keystone, and to the left is an extension with semicircular arched entrances. A low stable range at right angles links with a long single-storey outbuilding with eleven bays that contains doorways with monolithic jambs and rectangular vents.
St Peter's Chaplaincy; 53.79308°N 1.72234°W		c. 1800	A sandstone house on a plinth, with a moulded cornice and blocking course, and a stone slate roof with coped gables. There are two storeys and an attic, and a symmetrical front of five bays. The central doorway has Tuscan columns, a fluted door head, a semicircular fanlight, a broken entablature, and an open moulded pediment. The windows are sashes, and the window above the doorway has an architrave, a frieze with triglyphs, a moulded cornice, and a moulded sill on fluted consoles.
Stable block and coach house, St Peter's Chaplaincy; 53.79317°N 1.72216°W	—	c. 1800	The stable block and coach house are in stone with slate roofs. The stable block has coped gables, two storeys, and five bays, the middle bay projecting under a pediment. In the middle bay is a blocked segmental-arched entry with voussoirs and an inserted window, above it is a bull's eye window, and there is a dovecote in the tympanum. The coach house is lower, and contains a segmental archway.
Sunday school and 60 Killinghall Road, Laisterdyke; 53.79593°N 1.71929°W		1816	The former Sunday school and attached house are in sandstone, with sill bands, bracketed eaves, stone slate roofs, and two storeys. The former school has five bays, in the centre is a doorway with a plain surround, and above it is an inscribed and dated plaque. The house to the left is lower, with two bays, a doorway with squared jambs, and two-light mullioned windows.
3–25 Parratt Row, Laisterdyke; 53.79404°N 1.71995°W		c. 1820–30	A terrace of sandstone cottages, with sill bands, paired brackets to the eaves, and stone slate roofs. There are two storeys, and each cottage has two bays. The doorways have squared jambs, in the upper floor are single-light windows, and the ground floor contains two-light mullioned windows, some of which have been altered.
2–34 Mortimer Row, Laisterdyke; 53.79310°N 1.71785°W		c. 1830	A terrace of sandstone cottages, with sill bands, paired brackets to the eaves, and stone slate roofs. There are two storeys, and each cottage has two bays. The doorways have squared jambs, above each doorway is a single-light window, and in the other bay is a two-light mullioned window, with some mullions removed.
