= A647 road =

Road in West Yorkshire, England

A647

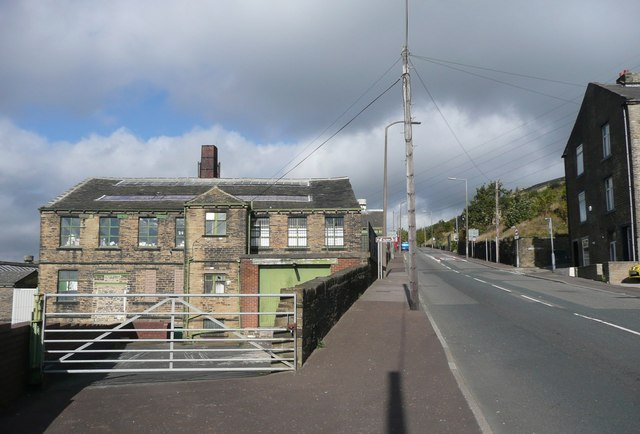
- The A647 climbing out of Halifax

Route information
- Length: 17 mi (27 km)

Major junctions
- East end: Leeds; 53.7945°N 1.5683°W
- A58 A643 A657 A6120 A6177 A6181 A650 A641 A644; A58
- West end: Halifax; 53.7283°N 1.8597°W

Location
- Country: United Kingdom
- Primary destinations: Bradford

Road network
- Roads in the United Kingdom; Motorways; A and B road zones

The A647 is an A road in West Yorkshire, England that begins in Leeds and ends in Halifax. The road is 17 miles (27 km) long.

== Route ==
The road begins at the Armley Gyratory and goes via Armley, by-passes Stanningley and Pudsey, then onwards via Thornbury to the edge of Bradford city centre.

The road then becomes part of the Bradford's Inner Ring Road (Croft Street) heading through Great Horton and up to Queensbury (1,150 feet (350 m) above sea level) before heading down hill via Boothtown to Halifax town centre.

== History ==
In June 2016 the CS1 Cycle Superhighway opened from Bradford to Leeds, for the most part following the corridor of the A647. However unlike similarly named schemes in the Netherlands and London, this route relies on allocated lane space within the vehicle carriageway which has led to criticism over its effectiveness from cycling and transport consultants.

=== Stanningley bypass ===
The road is a stretch of dual carriageway on the western edge of Leeds. The first section (Dawson's Corner to Richardshaw Lane) was built in the late 1960s and from there to Bramley/Armley in the early 1970s to ease traffic congestion along Stanningley Road, forming part of the Leeds Outer Ring Road. Prior to this the A647 passed through the centre of Stanningley along the line of the present B6157.

It is notable for the fact that it had Britain's first High Occupancy Vehicle Lane (HOV lane).
