= Bradford Moor =

Electoral ward in Bradford, England

Coordinates: 53.797°N 1.704°W

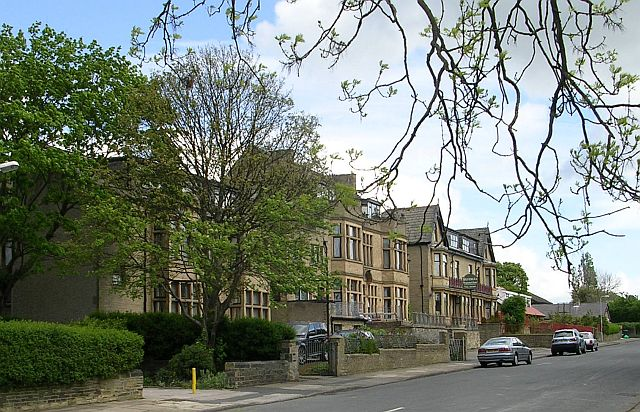
- First Avenue in the north of the ward

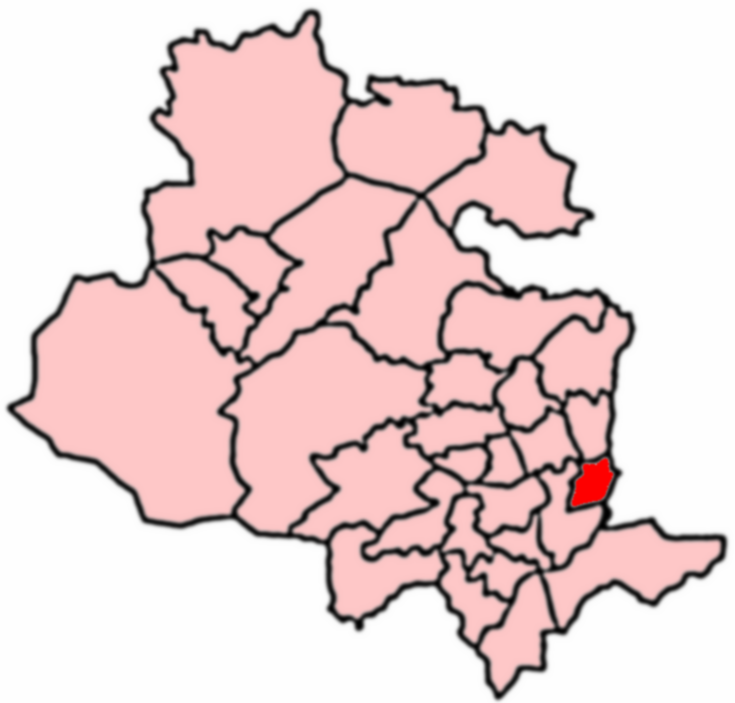
- 2004 Boundaries of Bradford Moor Ward
- Population: 21,210 (ward.2011)
- UK Parliament: Bradford East
- Councillors: Mohammed Shafiq (Labour); Zafar Iqbal (Labour); Riaz Ahmed (Lib Dem)

Bradford Moor is an electoral ward within the City of Bradford Metropolitan District Council. The population of the ward at the 2011 Census was 21,210. The ward includes the areas of Laisterdyke and Thornbury.

== History ==
Bradford Moor Barracks were located at the corner of Leeds Old Road and Killinghall Road.

== Geography ==
The ward covers the areas of Bradford known as Bradford Moor, Laisterdyke and Thornbury. It is bordered on the west by Barkerend and on the south by Bowling (both part of the same ward); on the north side is the Eccleshill ward and on the east is the Pudsey area of Leeds. The direct route between the centres of Bradford and Leeds passes through the middle of the ward as Leeds Old Road (B6381).

Bradford Moor was originally a moor, as the name suggests. Despite being near the centre of Bradford, it was urbanised relatively late in the city's history, but is now inner-city in character.

== Councillors ==
The ward is represented on Bradford Council by two Labour Party councillors, Mohammed Shafiq and Zafar Iqbal, and one Liberal Democrat councillor, Riaz Ahmed.

Election	Councillor	Councillor	Councillor
2004	Diloar J. Ali (Lib Dem)	Ghazanfer Khaliq (Lab)	Riaz Ahmed (Lib Dem)
2006	Mohammed Shafiq (Lab)	Ghazanfer Khaliq (Lab)	Riaz Ahmed (Lib Dem)
2007	Mohammed Shafiq (Lab)	Ghazanfer Khaliq (Lab)	Riaz Ahmed (Lib Dem)
2008	Mohammed Shafiq (Lab)	Ghazanfer Khaliq (Lab)	Riaz Ahmed (Lib Dem)
2010	Mohammed Shafiq (Lab)	Ghazanfer Khaliq (Lab)	Riaz Ahmed (Lib Dem)
2011	Mohammed Shafiq (Lab)	Ghazanfer Khaliq (Lab)	Riaz Ahmed (Lib Dem)
2012	Mohammed Shafiq (Lab)	Ghazanfer Khaliq (Lab)	Faisal Khan (Respect)
October 2013	Mohammed Shafiq (Lab)	Ghazanfer Khaliq (Lab)	Faisal Khan (Ind)
2014	Mohammed Shafiq (Lab)	Ghazanfer Khaliq (Lab)	Faisal Khan (Ind)
March 2015	Mohammed Shafiq (Lab)	Ghazanfer Khaliq (Lab)	Faisal Khan (Respect)
May 2015	Mohammed Shafiq (Lab)	Zafar Iqbal (Lab)	Faisal Khan (Respect)
2016	Mohammed Shafiq (Lab)	Zafar Iqbal (Lab)	Riaz Ahmed (Lib Dem)

indicates seat up for re-election. indicates councillor defection.

== See also ==
- Listed buildings in Bradford (Bradford Moor Ward)
