= Odeon Leeds-Bradford =

Multiplex cinema in Thornbury, West Yorkshire, England

Coordinates: 53.800°N 1.702°W

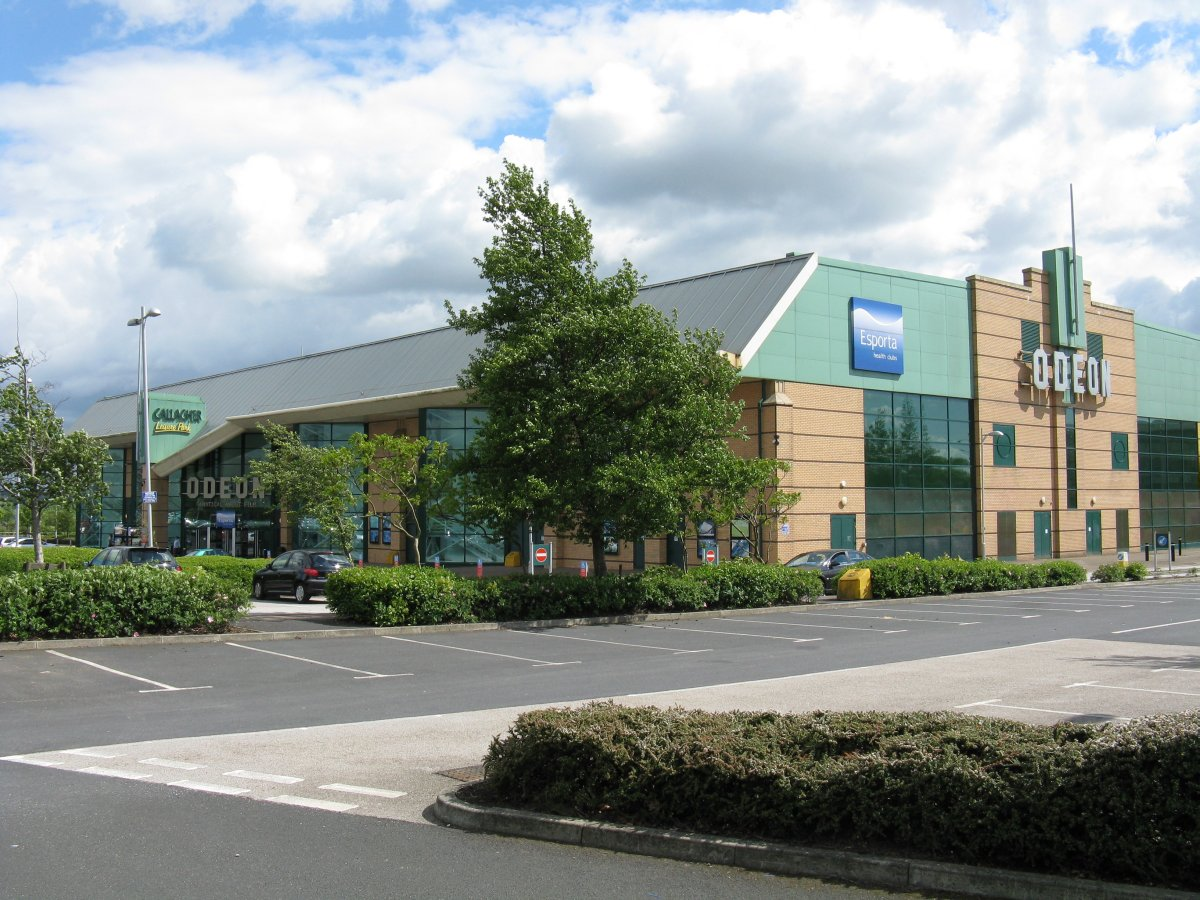
Odeon Leeds-Bradford

Odeon Leeds-Bradford is a multiplex cinema at Gallagher Leisure Park, Thornbury, West Yorkshire, between the cities of Leeds and Bradford in England.

It has 13 auditoria, ranging from 126 to 442 seats. All screens have Dolby Digital sound, and the two largest screens have DTS digital surround sound. In 2011 Odeon Cinemas had all 13 screens converted to digital using NEC digital cinema projectors, Doremi Servers and Unique System's Rosetta Bridge Theatre Management System. Seven of the screens are equipped for 3D projection with the RealD Cinema system.

Gallagher Group developed the Leisure Park at the end of the 1990s and contracted a major cinema chain to operate the multiplex. That chain withdrew before the cinema was completed, so Odeon Cinemas took over. The cinema opened on 6 July 2000, showing Stuart Little. Odeon had closed the Bradford Odeon in June 2000 and closed the Odeon Cinema Leeds in 2001.

In September 2017 the cinema underwent a major refit converting the cinema to Odeon Leeds-Bradford Luxe. This included the installation of Recliner chairs into every screen, refits to the foyer and toilets and the installation of a new food and drink retail counter as well as the introduction of a bar area installed into former unused space.
