= Emma Sharp =

British racewalker

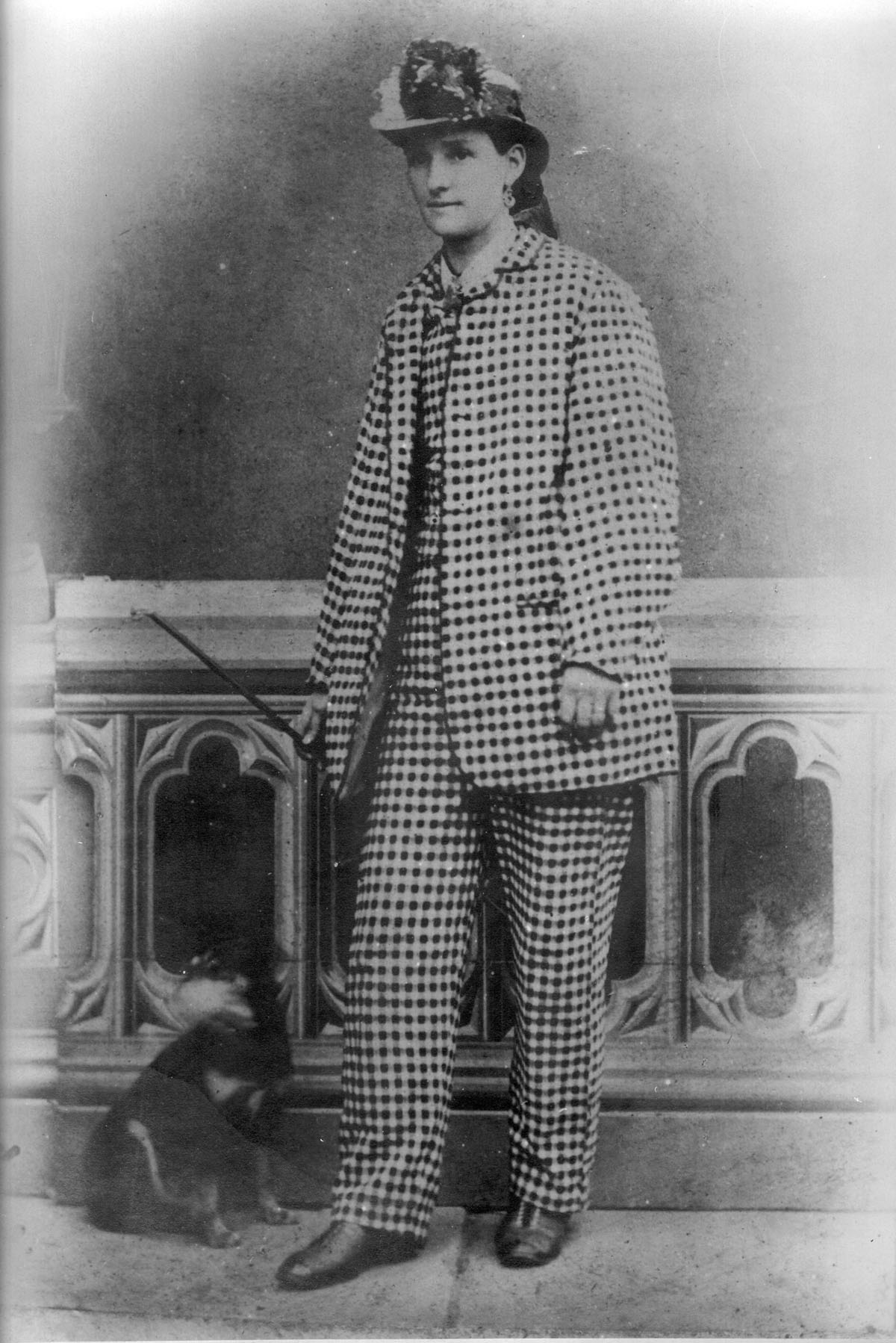
- Sharp in the attire she wore for the 1,000 mile walk
- Born: 1832; Bradford, England
- Died: 1920 (aged 87–88)
- Occupations: Pedestrianism and business

Emma Sharp (1832–1920) was an English athlete famous for her feat of pedestrianism completing a 1,000-mile walk in 1,000 hours, the event first completed by Robert Barclay Allardice in 1809. She is thought to be the first woman to complete the challenge, which lasted from 17 September to 29 October 1864. This 'arduous task' was reported in the newspapers of the day, in which she was described as having a medium build but an active frame, dressed in male clothing with the exception of her straw hat which was adorned with 'feminine ornaments'.

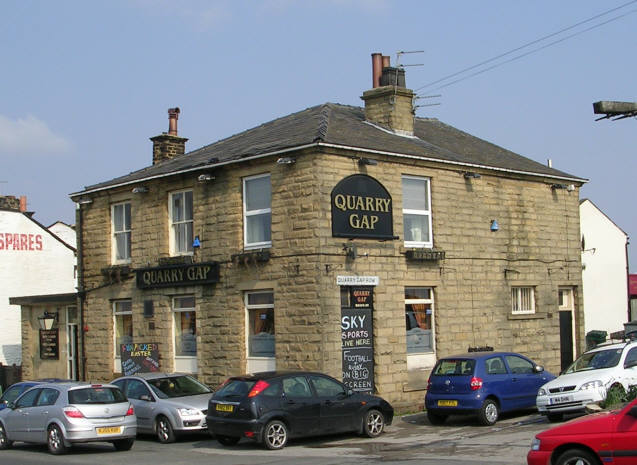
Quarry Gap pub – Dick Lane

She rested in the Quarry Gap pub, in Bradford, UK, in between walking approximately two mile stints every 90 minutes and completing 14,600 laps of 120 yards over the course of 1,000 hours. It is reported that her food was drugged and people attempted to trip her to prevent her from finishing, for the last two days she carried a pistol to protect herself. At the end of the walk the weather was extremely wet. The event was heavily wagered upon both in Leeds and provincial towns.

Sharp is reported to have used the proceeds of the walk, which exceeded £500, to set up a rug making business in Perseverance works in Laisterdyke, and to have had a life in business after the event.

Her journey was covered by Horrible Histories and broadcast on children's BBC (CBBC).

== Family ==
She was married to mechanic John Sharp. Her granddaughter Ann Land retained her walking stick as a memento. Her great great granddaughter Kathy Nicol was interviewed on the subject of the 1,000 mile walk in 2009. A distant relative, Val Moran, planned to match the achievement around Lennox Gardens, Adelaide Australia in 2009.
