= Laisterdyke Leadership Academy =

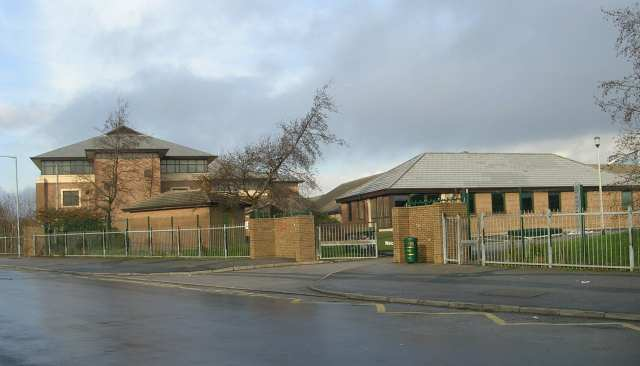

Location
- Thornbury Road; Bradford, West Yorkshire, BD3 8HE; England; 53°47′47″N 1°42′53″W

Information
- Type: Academy
- Local authority: City of Bradford
- Trust: Star Academies
- Department for Education URN: 142681 Tables
- Ofsted: Reports
- Principal: Hafeez Khan
- Gender: Co-educational
- Age: 11 to 18
- Enrolment: 1,094
- Website: http://www.laisterdykeleadershipacademy.com/

Laisterdyke Leadership Academy is a co-educational secondary school and sixth form located in Bradford, West Yorkshire, England.

== History ==
Following the re-organisation of education in the local education authority (LEA) in September 1999 the school changed from a middle school for pupils aged 8 to 13 to its current designation. In September 2002, Laisterdyke High School admitted its first intake of sixth form students and became an 11 to 18 school.

The school previously gained Business and Enterprise College status and was renamed Laisterdyke Business and Enterprise College. In April 2016 the school was converted to academy status and was renamed Laisterdyke Leadership Academy. The school is now part of Star Academies.

== Facilities ==
As part of its upgrade and building development, the school has provided ICT facilities for pupils, staff and surrounding schools. Since the switch from a middle to secondary school, Laisterdyke has added a sports hall, a second dining hall, new classrooms, including an English teaching block, a worship room for pupils and teachers, a Post-16 area and three new labs as well as a new main reception.In 2019 the school decided to abolish the Post 16 department and remove the 16 to 18 students as a result peaceful protests were led by students. However, there decision stayed and the 2019 6 forum student were the last ever to study there.

== Achievements ==
The school has won a Schools Drug Prevention Charter Award for its efforts in anti-drug education icarried out jointly with local units of the Rotary Club and the Soroptimists Club of Great Britain, as well as with the Bradford Bulls rugby club. For three years, the college has also run a literacy project known as Leap into Books. This has involved more than 400 children from local primary schools over the three years, as well as Laisterdyke students.
