= Robert Barclay Allardice =

Scottish walker (1779–1854)

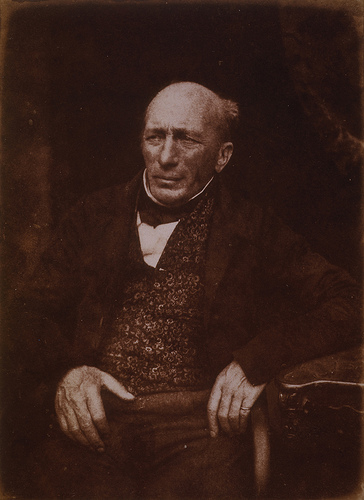
Photograph of Allardyce by Hill & Adamson

Robert Barclay Allardice of Ury (25 August 1779 – 1 May 1854), better known as Captain Barclay, was a Scottish walker of the early 19th century, known as the Celebrated Pedestrian. His most famous feat was walking 1,000 miles in 1,000 hours for 1,000 guineas in 1809. He is considered the father of the 19th-century sport of pedestrianism, a precursor to racewalking. He should not be confused with his father, who had assumed the name Robert Barclay Allardice and undertook the first redevelopment of the town of Stonehaven.

== Family ==
Robert Barclay Allardice was a member of an ancient Scottish family (see Clan Barclay) and the great-great-grandson of Robert Barclay, 2nd of Ury (1648–1690), who in 1678 published a noted Apology (i.e. defence) of the Quaker faith. The family that founded Barclays Bank was descended from this 2nd Laird.

Captain Barclay's father was Robert Barclay, 5th of Ury (1732–1797), MP for Kincardineshire from 1788. The MP was descended via his mother, Une, daughter of Ewen Cameron of Lochiel from Clan Cameron. The 5th laird's first wife (and cousin) was Lucy, daughter of David Barclay of Cheapside, a wealthy London merchant. She died in childbirth, leaving a daughter, also Lucy, who married Samuel Galton Jr. of the Lunar Society.

Robert Senior remarried many years later, in 1776, Sarah Ann Allardice, a descendant of Robert II of Scotland and of the Earls of Airth, Menteith and Strathearn. In recognition of the nobility of his wife's family Robert Barclay thenceforth took the surname of Allardice. Robert Barclay Allardice, the subject of this article, was born the year after the marriage. Several brothers and sisters followed.

Several of the Barclay family were noted for unusual strength. The first Laird of Ury was reputed one of the strongest men in the country at the time of the English Civil War, and Robert Barclay Allardice senior was himself a noted pedestrian, who once walked 510 miles (820 km) from Ury to London in 10 days.

Captain Barclay made his home at Fritwell Manor in Oxfordshire.

== Feats of pedestrianism ==
- In 1801 Captain Barclay walked 110 miles (177 km) in 19 hr 27 min in a muddy park
- In 1802 Barclay walked 64 miles (103 km) in 10 hours
- In 1805 Barclay walked 72 miles (116 km) between breakfast and dinner
- In 1806 Barclay walked 100 miles (161 km) over bad roads in 19 hours
- In 1807 Barclay walked 78 miles (125 km) on hilly roads in 14 hours

== The thousand-hour walk ==
Captain Barclay's most famous exploit took place between 1 June and 12 July 1809 at Newmarket, during which he walked 1 mile (1.6 km) in each of 1,000 successive hours to win an initial wager of 1,000 guineas.

The enterprise quite caught the public imagination. The Times, which carried little general interest news, printed this report alongside an account of the campaigns of Marshal Soult in the Peninsular War (14 July):

The gentleman on Wednesday completed his arduous pedestrian undertaking, to walk a thousand miles in a thousand successive hours, at the rate of a mile in each and every hour. He had until four o'clock P.M. to finish his task; but he performed his last mile in the quarter of an hour after three, with perfect ease and great spirit, amidst an immense concourse of spectators. The influx of company had so much increased on Sunday, that it was recommended that the ground should be roped in. To this, Captain Barclay at first objected; but the crowd became so great on Monday, and he had experienced so much interruption, that he was at last prevailed upon to allow this precaution to be taken. For the last two days he appeared in higher spirits, and performed his walk with apparently more ease, and in shorter time than he had done for some days before. With the change of the weather, he had thrown off his loose great coat, which he wore during the rainy period, and on Wednesday performed in a flannel jacket. He also put on shoes thicker than any which he had used in the earlier part of his performance. He said that during the first night after his walk he would have himself awoke twice or thrice, to avoid the danger of a too sudden transition from almost constant exertion to a state of long repose.

One hundred to one, and indeed any odds whatever, were offered on Wednesday; but so strong was the confidence in his success, that no bets could be obtained. The multitude of people who resorted to the scene of action, in the course of the concluding days, was unprecedented. Not a bed could be procured on Tuesday night at Newmarket, Cambridge, or any of the towns and villages in the vicinity, and every horse and every species of vehicle was engaged. Among the Nobility and Gentry who witnessed the conclusion of this extraordinary feat, were:—

The Dukes of Argyle and St. Alban's; Earls Grosvenor, Bessborough and Jersey; Lords Foley and Somerville; Sir John Lode, Sir F. Standish, &c. &c.

Capt Barclay had a large sum depending upon his undertaking. The aggregate of the bets is supposed to amount to £100,000.—He commenced his feat on the first of June.

During the 42 days of this exercise his time per mile increased from 14 m 54 s to 21 m 4 s and his weight dropped from 13 st 4 lb (84.5 kg)(186 lbs) to 11 st (70 kg)(154 lbs). If the report of the total wagers was accurate they were equivalent to some £5 million ($US 8 million) in modern terms.

The first woman to emulate his feat successfully was Emma Sharp.

== Financial backer and trainer of boxers ==
In addition to walking Captain Barclay was active in the financial backing and training of bare-knuckle fighters. The most celebrated fighters that he trained were Tom Molineaux and Tom Cribb, (Champion of England).

== Army career ==
Captain Barclay's rank was in the 23rd Regiment of Foot, which he joined in 1805. In 1809 he served as aide-de-camp to Alexander Gordon, 4th Duke of Gordon on the ill-fated Walcheren Campaign, starting out just 5 days after the completion of the 1,000-mile feat.

== Claims to titles ==
Captain Barclay claimed the Earldom of Airth, his lawyers claiming that this title could be inherited through the female line. The claim was rejected by the House of Lords in 1839. A similar claim to the Earldoms of Menteith and Strathearn was not pursued. A curious aside to the latter claim is that it would have implied that Captain Barclay was the rightful King of Scotland.

== Descent of the title ==
Captain Barclay died in 1854 from injuries from the kick of a horse. The only surviving child from his marriage was a daughter, Margaret, who had moved to America but eventually resettled in Great Britain and retired to Cornwall with her eldest son, also a Robert Barclay-Allardice (who later became Mayor of Lostwithiel between 1899-1901 and 1904-6). This Robert Barclay-Allardice married and had one daughter, Mary Graham Barclay-Allardice, whose descendants (through an only daughter, Margaret – the great-great granddaughter of Captain Barclay) live in Gloucestershire and Hampshire.

The Lairdship of Ury, heritable only through the male line, passed to a third cousin, Charles Barclay, who lived in Surrey.

== Bibliography ==
- Radford, Peter (2001). The Celebrated Captain Barclay: Sport, Money and Fame in Regency Britain. Headline. ISBN 978-0-7472-7222-9. 342pp.
- Walter Thom (1813). Pedestrianism; Or, An Account of the Performances of Celebrated Pedestrians During the Last and Present Century: With a Full Narrative of Captain Barclay's Public and Private Matches; and an Essay on Training. A. Brown, and F. Frost. 278pp.
- Harvey, Adrian (2004). The beginnings of a commercial sporting culture in Britain : 1793 - 1850 ([Online-Ausg.]. ed.). Burlington, VT: Ashgate. ISBN 9780754636434.
