= List of people from the City of Bradford =

This is a list of people from the City of Bradford, a metropolitan district in West Yorkshire, England. This list includes people from Bradford, and the wider metropolitan borough, and includes people from Keighley, Shipley, Bingley and Ilkley and other areas. This list is arranged alphabetically by surname:

Table of contents:

A B C D E F G H I J K L M N O P Q R S T U V W X Y Z

See also • References

== A ==
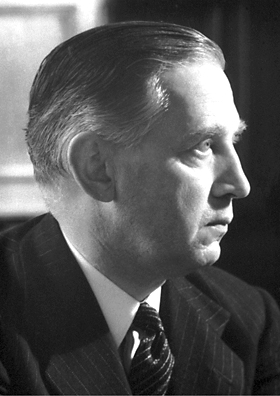
Sir Edward Appleton

- Steve Abbott – (born 28 July 1954) film producer and executive producer. His credits include A Fish Called Wanda, American Friends, Blame it on the Bellboy, Brassed Off and Fierce Creatures. Abbott was born in Bradford.
- Christa Ackroyd – (born 1957) television and radio presenter, born in Eccleshill.
- Richard Alexander – (born 1971) television presenter, producer & director, born in Wibsey.
- Eric Anderson, – (1915–1943) recipient of the Victoria Cross. Born in Fagley, Bradford.
- Natalie Anderson – (born 24 October 1981) English actress best known for her roles as Alicia Gallagher in the ITV soap opera Emmerdale and Stella Davenport in the medical drama The Royal, was born in Bradford.
- Sir Edward Appleton – (1892–1965) physicist and Nobel prizewinner, born in Bradford.
- Richard J. Appleton – (1856–1946) a camera manufacturer and film maker, Appleton devised a tri-partite apparatus which he called the Cieroscope, combining the functions of camera, printer and projector, first put into use in November 1896.
- Robert Appleyard (27 June 1924 – 17 March 2015) Yorkshire and England cricketer. He was one of the best English bowlers of the 1950s, a decade which saw England develop its strongest bowling attack of the twentieth century. Born in Bradford.
- Tasmin Archer – (born 1963) pop singer, born in Bradford.

== B ==
- David Bairstow – (1951–1998) was a cricketer, born in Bradford, who played for Yorkshire CCC and England. He also played football for Bradford City.

Sir Jacob Behrens, 1882

- Jonny Bairstow – (born 1989) cricketer, born in Bradford, who plays first-class cricket for Yorkshire CCC and England.
- Bruce Bannister – (born 14 April 1947) retired professional footballer who played for Bradford City FC. Bannister founded a successful sports clothing and footwear business, SportsShoes.com. Born in Bradford.
- Juliet Barker – (born 1958) British historian, specialising in the Middle Ages and literary biography.
- Linda Barker – (born 6 October 1961) English interior designer and television presenter. Educated at Bradford Girls' Grammar School.
- Wright Barker – (1863–1941) English painter, born in Great Horton, Bradford.
- Geoffrey Barraclough – (10 May 1908 – 26 December 1984) British historian, known as a medievalist and historian of Germany. Born in Bradford
- John Bateman – (born 30 September 1993) is an English professional rugby league footballer who plays as second-row, loose forward and centre for the Canberra Raiders in the NRL, and England and Great Britain at international level. Born in Bradford.
- Ivy Bean – (1905–2010) oldest Twitter user, one of the oldest Facebook users, and a centenarian
- Simon Beaufoy – (born 1967) Academy Award-winning screenwriter, born in Keighley.
- Sir Jacob Behrens – (1806–1889) Anglo-German textile merchant. He was a founder of the Bradford Chamber of Commerce in 1851.
- Gerard Benson – (1931–2014) originally from London, Bradford's first and only poet laureate. Gerard was a Quaker, a poet and a teacher. Lived in Manningham.
- David Berglas – (1926–2023) psychological magician, mentalist, and mnemonist.
- Sharon Beshenivsky – (1967–2005) police constable, born in Bradford, who was killed in the line of duty on Friday 18 November 2005.
- Tony Bevan – (born 1951) British painter. He studied at Bradford School of Art from 1968 to 1971, followed by Goldsmiths' College, London from 1971 to 1974, and the Slade School of Fine Art from 1974 to 1976. He was elected to the Royal Academy of Arts in London as an Academician in 2007. Born in Bradford.

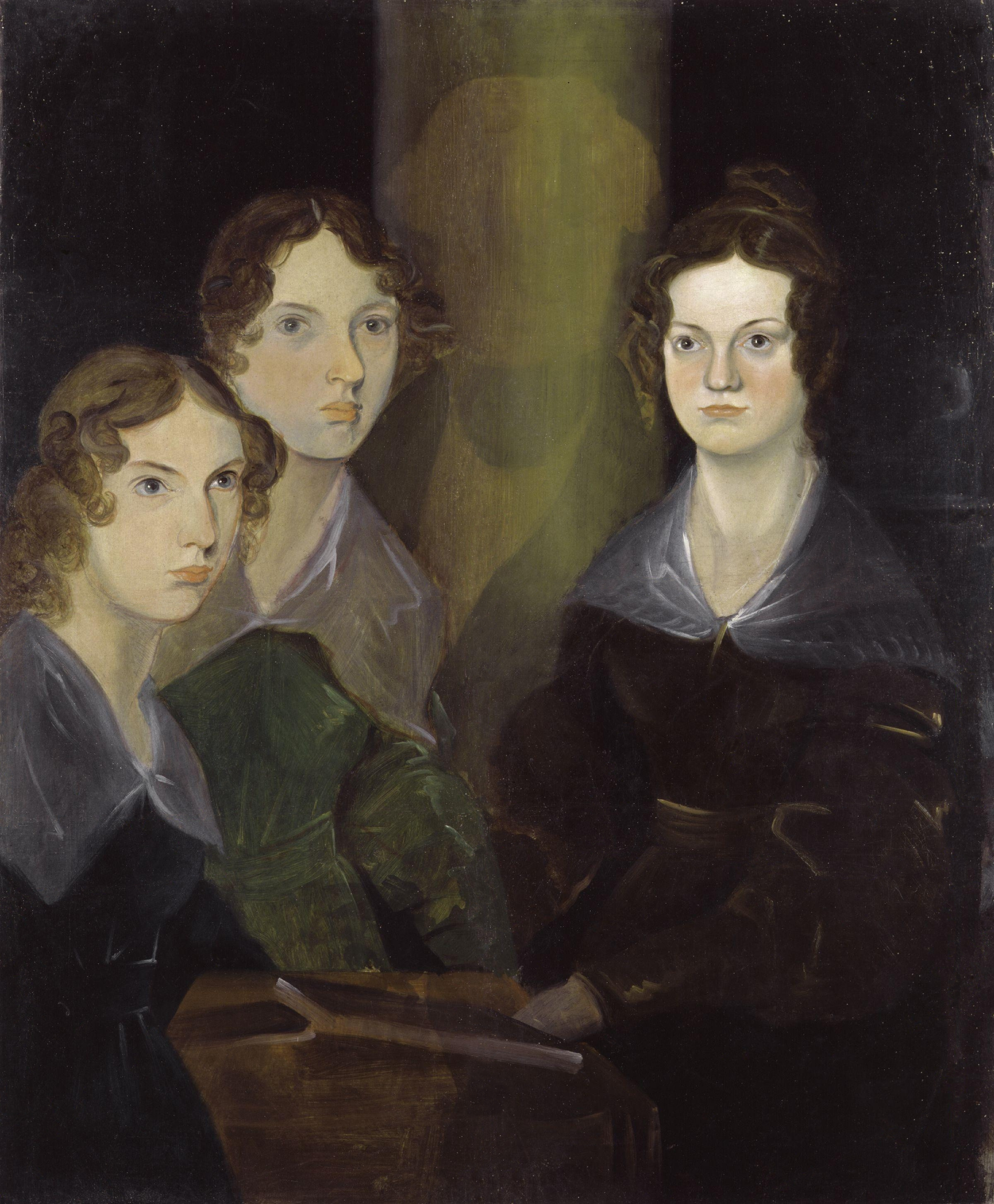
The three Brontë sisters, in an 1834 painting by their brother Patrick Branwell. From left to right: Anne, Emily and Charlotte. (Branwell used to be between Emily and Charlotte, but subsequently painted himself out.)

- Rodney Bewes – (1937–2017) English television actor and writer. Born in Bingley.
- William Binnie – (1867–1949) civil engineer educated at Bradford Grammar School.
- David Blamires – (born 16 March 1957) English Grammy award-winning musician, born in Bradford.
- Ernst Wilhelm Bohle – (1903–1960) was the leader of the Foreign Organization of the National Socialist German Workers' Party (NSDAP/AO) from 1933. Born in Bradford
- Tim Booth – (born 4 February 1960) English singer, dancer and actor best known as the lead singer from the band James. Born in Bradford.
- Aidy Boothroyd – (born 1971) football coach and manager, born in Baildon.
- Bill Bowes – (25 July 1908 – 4 September 1987) one of the best bowlers of the interwar period and, for a time, the most important force behind Yorkshire's then dominance of the County Championship. Lived in Menston.
- John Gerard Braine – (1922–1986) novelist, born in Bingley.
- Asa Briggs, Baron Briggs – (born 7 May 1921) English historian known for his work on the Victorian era.
- Anne Brontë – (1820–1849) novelist and poet, born in Thornton on the outskirts of Bradford.
- Charlotte Brontë – (1816–1855) novelist and poet, born in Thornton.
- Emily Brontë – (1818–1848) novelist and poet, born in Thornton.
- Patrick Branwell Brontë – (1817–1848) painter, writer and poet, born in Thornton.
- Alfred J. Brown – (1894–1969) travel writer, novelist (pseudonym: Julian Laverack) and poet.

== C ==
- Alastair Campbell – (born 1957) political aide and Labour Party strategist associated with Tony Blair. Born in Keighley.
- Bobby Campbell – (1956–2016) former Northern Irish footballer, played for Bradford City Football Club
- Horace James Cannon – (1895–1975) was awarded the George Cross. Date and place of the action: 26 January 1918 Spitalgate, Grantham, Lincolnshire. Born in Bradford.
- Maurice Carter (c. 1918 – 2011), New Zealand property developer and local politician born in Bradford.
- Barbara Castle, Baroness Castle of Blackburn – (1910–2002) British Labour Party politician. Her family lived in Bradford from when she was 12; she was educated at Bradford Girls' Grammar School.
- Dean Cavanagh – (born 1966) writer for screen, film and theatre. Born in Allerton.
- George William Chafer – (1894–1966) English recipient of the Victoria Cross. Born in Bradford.
- Kathleen Chambers – became the first female Lord Mayor of Bradford in 1945.
- Enzo Cilenti – (born 8 August 1974) English actor, educated at Bradford Grammar School. Born in Bradford.
- Helen Clare – (29 November 1916 – 15 September 2018) Singer on BBC Radio and with British dance bands in the 1930 and 1940s; born in Bradford, she also lived in Shipley when growing up.
- John Coates – (29 June 1865 – 16 August 1941) leading English tenor, who sang in opera and oratorio and on the concert platform. Born in Bradford.
- Harry Corbett – (1918–1989) puppeteer, born in Bradford. Known as the creator in 1948 of the long running 'Sooty' glove puppet character.
- Richard Corbett – (born 6 January 1955) Member of the European Parliament (MEP) for Yorkshire & Humber 1999–2009 and 2014–2020 and the last Leader of the European Parliamentary Labour Party (EPLP) 2017–2020, lived in Saltaire and then Wrose (Shipley).
- Tom Cleverley – (born 1989) footballer who was brought up in Bradford and started his career at Bradford City.
- Ian Clough – (1937–1970) mountaineer, born in Baildon, who was killed on an expedition to climb the south face of the Himalayan massif Annapurna.
- Albert Crewe – (1927–2009) American physicist born in Bradford, inventor of the modern scanning transmission electron microscope.
- Bryan R. Cullen – (born 1951) professor of molecular genetics and microbiology at Duke University Medical Center
- Joe Cullen – (born 1989) PDC professional darts player born in Bradford

== D ==
Frederick Delius

- Ann Daniels, British polar explorer
- Sir Benjamin Dawson, 1st Baronet (1878–1966) – chairman of Joseph Dawson Ltd., cashmere textile manufacturers.
- Kiki Dee – (born 1947) singer, born Pauline Matthews in Little Horton.
- Frederick Delius – (1862–1934) composer born in Bradford.
- Fabian Delph – (born 1989) footballer, born in Bradford, who plays as a midfielder for Everton and has represented his country at Senior level.
- Joolz Denby – (born 1955) poet, novelist and artist based in Bradford.
- A A Dhand – British Asian crime writer and pharmacist who grew up in Bradford.
- William Henry Drew – (1854–1933) textile worker, early trade unionist and one of the founders of the Independent Labour Party, who worked and died in Bradford.
- Andrea Dunbar – (1961–1990) Bradford born playwright best known for the autobiographical drama and film, Rita, Sue and Bob Too
- Richard Dunn – (born 1945) professional boxer; a former European, British and Commonwealth Heavyweight Champion who lived in Bradford.
- Dynamo – (Steven Frayne, born 1982) street magician and TV personality, born in Bradford.
- Sir Frank Watson Dyson – (1868–1939) astronomer Royal 1910–1933. Brought up in Bradford from an early age.

== E ==
- Adrian Edmondson – (born 24 January 1957) comedian, writer, director, actor, and musician. Born in Bradford.
- Friederich Wilhelm Eurich – (1867–1945) professor of forensic medicine and bacteriologist who worked and lived in Bradford and did much to conquer anthrax in the wool trade.
- Richard Eurich – (1903–1992) artist and landscape painter born in Bradford.

== F ==
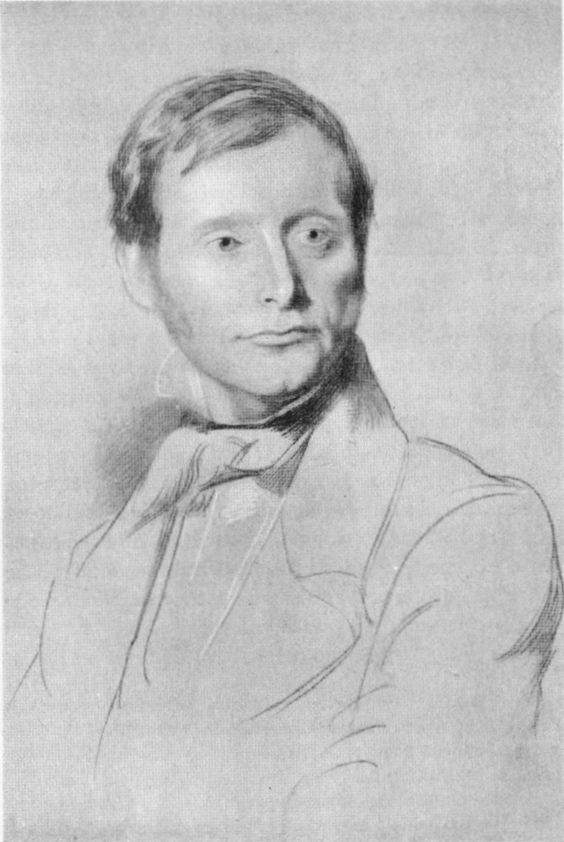
William Edward Forster

- Charles Edward Fairburn – (5 September 1887 – 12 October 1945) Chief Mechanical Engineer of the London, Midland and Scottish Railway. Born in Bradford
- Susan Fassbender – (1959– 1992) English singer, songwriter and musician. Born in Bradford.
- Antonio Fattorini (Tony) – watchmaker, jeweller, chess enthusiast, well known local sportsman, Olympic timekeeper and founder member of Bradford City Football Club.
- John Enrico Fattorini – (1878–1949) jeweller, entrepreneur, founder of the Bradford mail order firm Grattan.
- Wilfred Fienburgh – (1919–1958) British Labour Party politician. He was brought up in Bradford.
- John Foster (1798–1879) was the founder of Black Dyke Mills.
- Walter C. Foster – (1887–1929) artist who studied at the Royal College of Art. His work was exhibited at Cartwright Hall between 1911 and 1919. Born in Bingley.
- Alfred Fowler (22 March 1868 – 24 June 1940) was an English astronomer. Born in Wilsden.
- Samson Fox – (1838–1903) engineer, industrialist and philanthropist, born in Bowling, Bradford.
- Thomas Fairfax, 3rd Lord Fairfax of Cameron – "Black Tom" (1612–1671) general and parliamentary commander-in-chief during the civil war. Born at Denton Hall, Otley.
- Peter Firth – (born 1953) actor born in Bradford.
- William Edward Forster – (1818–1886) industrialist, philanthropist and Liberal Party statesman. MP for Bradford, he is commemorated by a statue, and Forster Square is named after him.
- Rodney Friend – (born 1940) violinist. He won a scholarship aged 12 to the Royal Academy of Music. In 1964 Friend became the youngest ever leader of the London Philharmonic Orchestra. Born in Bradford.

== G ==
- Kenneth Garside – (1913–1983) librarian, information theorist and World War II British Intelligence Corps officer. Born in Bradford.
- Gareth Gates – (born 1984) singer-songwriter born in Bradford.
- William Gay – (1814–1893) landscape gardener, surveyor and cemetery designer.
- Lisa Gormley – (born 1984) actress in Home and Away. Born in Bradford, moved to Australia at age 3.
- John William Gott – (1866–1922) from Bradford, last person in Britain to be tried for blasphemy.
- Harry Gration – (1950–2022) journalist and broadcaster based in Leeds. He is one of the main anchors for the BBC Yorkshire regional magazine programme Look North. Born in Bradford.
- Mason Greenwood (born 1 October 2001) is an English professional footballer who plays as a forward for Premier League club Manchester United and the England under-21 team.

== H ==
- Rory Haines – (born 22 June 1984) BAFTA nominated screenwriter and showrunner known for the TV series Informer. Born in Bradford.
- Bobby Ham – (born 29 March 1942) retired English professional footballer who played for Bradford City FC, Preston North End FC and Bradford Park Avenue. Born in Bradford.
- Des Hamilton (born 1976), retired professional footballer who played for Bradford City, scoring the club's first goal at Wembley, born in Bradford.
- John Lawrence Hammond – (18 July 1872 – 7 April 1949) British journalist and writer on social history and politics. Educated at Bradford Grammar School.
- James Robert Hanson – (born 9 November 1987) Retired English professional footballer who played for Bradford City. In 2013 he scored the goal that sent Bradford City to their first major cup final appearance since 1911. Hanson is Bradford City FC's third highest goalscorer of all time. Born in Bradford.
- Nanette Hanson – (1941–1967) teacher awarded the George Cross who was killed while protecting her pupils from a gunman at St John's RC High School in Dundee. Nanette was born in Bradford.
- Robert Hardy – (born 1980) bassist for the Glasgow-based band, Franz Ferdinand. He grew up in Wyke, Bradford.
- Barbara Jane Harrison – (1945–1968) British air stewardess who was awarded the George Cross for heroism, and is one of only two women to be awarded the medal for gallantry in peacetime, the other being Nanette Hanson. Barbara was born in Bradford.
- Robert Heaton – (1961–2004) drummer for the Bradford band, New Model Army.
- John Helm – (born 1942) British sports commentator. Born in Baildon.
- John Hendrie – (born 1963) Scottish former professional association footballer who played for Bradford City FC in the 1980s. Lives in Menston.
- Georgie Henley – (born 1995) actress, born in Ilkley. Best known for her portrayal of Lucy Pevensie in The Chronicles of Narnia film series.

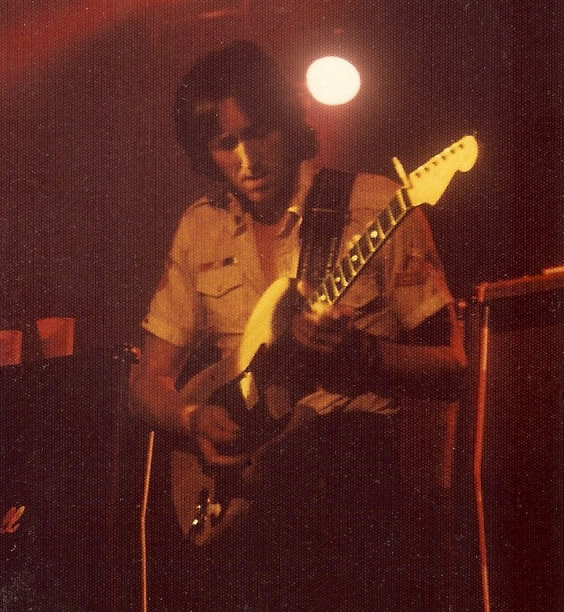
Allan Holdsworth

- Francis Bernard Heptonstall – (19 October 1925 – 27 July 2018) better known by the stage name Bernard Hepton, was an English theatre director and actor. Born in Bradford.
- Fanny Hertz – (1830 – 13 March 1908) was an educationalist who lived in Bradford for several decades.
- James Hill – (1 August 1919 – 7 October 1994) Academy Award-winning British film and television director, screenwriter and producer. Born in Eldwick.
- Michael Hirst (born 21 September 1952) is an English screenwriter and producer, best known for his films Elizabeth (1998) and Elizabeth: The Golden Age (2007), as well as the Emmy Award-winning television series The Tudors and Vikings. Born in Bradford.

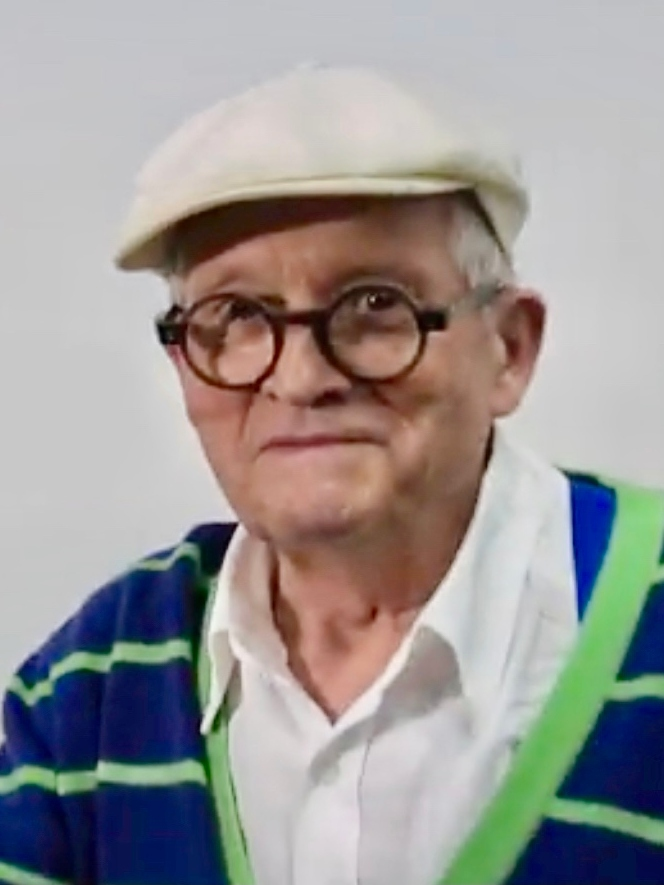
David Hockney

- David Hockney – ( 9 July 1937 - 11 June 2026) was a British painter, draughtsman, printmaker, stage designer and photographer, who was born in Bradford.
- Allan Holdsworth – (6 August 1946 – 15 April 2017) British guitarist and composer. He released twelve studio albums as a solo artist and played a variety of musical styles spanning a period of more than four decades. Born in Bradford.
- Professor Alan Howard (b. 1968). British geographer and official biographer of "American Pie" singer-songwriter Don McLean. Born at St. Luke's and lived in Allerton.
- Fred Hoyle – (1915–2001) astronomer and mathematician known for the steady state theory of creation. Born in Gilstead, Bingley.
- Matthew Hoyle – British motorcycle racer who has competed in the Red Bull MotoGP Rookies Cup and the 125cc World Championship. He won the British 125cc Championship in 2008.
- Paul Hudson – (born 1971) meteorologist and television weather presenter for BBC Yorkshire. He was born in Keighley.
- Mathew Hughes (1822–1882) English recipient of the Victoria Cross. Hughes was born in Bradford.
- John Hustler – (1715–1790) Quaker wool-stapler in Bradford, who was largely responsible, at the start of the Industrial Revolution, for transforming Bradford from a village to prosperous industrial town.

== J ==
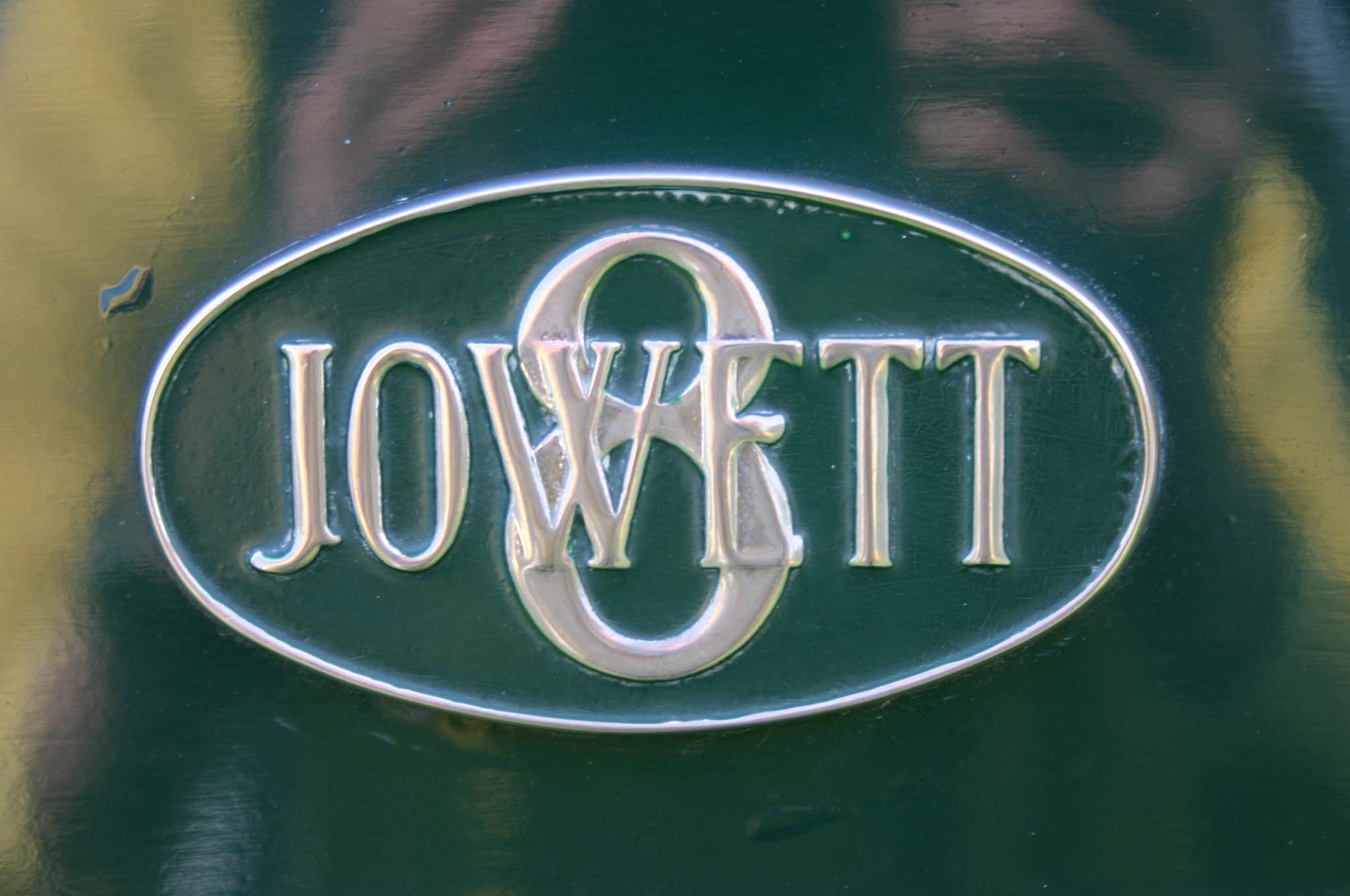
Jowett Cars Eight badge

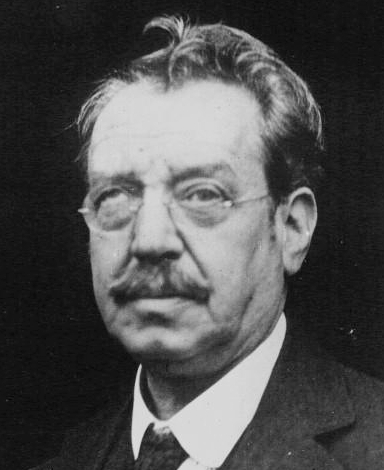
Frederick William Jowett

- Mick Jackson b.1950, bassist with the band Love Affair
- Peter Jackson – (born 1961) football manager and former footballer, he was Bradford City FC's youngest ever captain, he lifted the 3rd division championship trophy on the day of the Bradford Fire disaster in 1985. He was born in Bradford.
- William Jackson – (1815–1866) organist and composer. He was organist of St. John's Church at Bradford and was conductor of Bradford Choral Union, and chorus master of Bradford Festivals.
- Wayne Jacobs – (born 1969) English football coach and former professional player who founded the Bradford charity 'One in a Million', helping disadvantaged children in the city.
- Paul Jewell – (born 1964) football manager and former player, he took Bradford City AFC into the premier League in 1999. He also played 269 games for the club. Lives in Menston.
- Joe Johnson – (born 1952) former professional snooker player, born in Bradford. He is best known as the surprise winner of the 1986 World Championship.
- Peter B. Johnson – (1925–2016) correspondent for Reuters and BBC.
- Benjamin Jowett – (1877–1963) co-founder of the Bradford-based car manufacturer, Jowett Cars Ltd.
- Frederick William Jowett – (1864–1944) British Labour politician, born in Bradford.
- William Jowett – (1880–1965) co-founder of the Bradford-based car manufacturer, Jowett Cars Ltd.

== K ==
- Aabid Khan – Islamic terrorist propagandist
- Omar Khan – entrepreneur best known for the Indian restaurant chain of the same name and is the former owner of the Bradford Bulls. Khan has also been noted for his community and philanthropic work in his home city of Bradford.
- Edd Kimber – (born 1985) winner of The Great British Bake Off series 1 and author of 8 cookbooks
- Ken Kitson – Actor appeared in the Sweeney & Minder
- Eric Knight – (1897–1943) author who created the fictional collie Lassie, born in Menston.

== L ==
- Jim Laker – (1922–1986) Surrey and England cricketer, born in Frizinghall.
- Arthur V Lamb – co-founder of the Bradford-based car manufacturer, Jowett Cars Ltd.
- Wilfred Lawson (1900–1966)-born Wilfred Worsnop in Cleckheaton.
- Malcolm Richard Laycock – (1 November 1938 – 8 November 2009) British radio presenter and producer. Born in Keighley.
- George Layton – (born George Lowy, 1943) actor, director, screenwriter and author, born in Bradford.
- Peter Layton – (born 1938) glass artist and author, brought up in Bradford and is a co-founder of the Contemporary Glass Society.
- Rudi Leavor – (31 May 1926 – 27 July 2021) Was President and Chairman of the Bradford Tree of Life Synagogue. In the spring of 2013, aged 86, he secured funding for urgent repairs to the Grade II listed 1881 built Synagogue, with the help of the local Muslim Community through the Bradford Council for Mosques and other businesses and groups in the area. Lived in Bradford.
- Rachel Leskovac – (born 5 June 1976) Olivier award-nominated British actress. Rachel was born in Bradford.
- Samuel Lister, 1st Baron Masham – (1815–1906) English inventor and industrialist, notable for inventing the Lister nip comb. Born in Calverley Old Hall near Bradford.

== M ==
- James Joseph Magennis – (27 October 1919 – 12 February 1986) Belfast born recipient of the Victoria Cross. Lived in Bradford from 1955 onwards.
- Zayn Malik – (born 12 January 1993) Singer-songwriter and former member of UK boy band, One Direction.
- Aasif Hakim Mandviwala – (born 5 March 1966) known professionally as Aasif Mandvi is an Indian-American actor and comedian. Brought up in Bradford.
- Mick Manning – (born 1959) British artist and creator of children's books, born in Haworth.
- Barrie Maskell – F3 racing driver born in scholemoor (1938–2014)
- Peter Marks – (born 1949) English businessman, and the former Chief Executive of the member-owned retailer The Co-operative Group.
- Thomas Harold Broadbent Maufe – (6 May 1898 – 28 March 1942) English recipient of the Victoria Cross. Born in Ilkley.
- Sir Douglas Mawson – (1882–1958) Antarctic explorer and geologist, born in Shipley.
- Stuart McCall – (born 1964) football manager and former midfielder for Bradford City A.F.C. and Scotland.
- Harry McEvoy – (16 August 1902 – 3 November 1984) British industrialist and food manufacturer. He was born in Bradford, and educated at Bradford Grammar School.
- Anthony McGrath – (born 1975) born in Bradford and is a first-class cricketer for Yorkshire CCC and England.
- Chantel McGregor – (born 1986) British blues rock guitarist and singer-songwriter. She attended Leeds College of Music where she achieved a number of awards, including the Leeds College of Music Prize for Outstanding Musicianship. McGregor was born in Bradford.
- Yvonne McGregor – (born 9 April 1961) English former professional cyclist. She was made an MBE for services to cycling in the 2002 New Year Honours. Yvonne was born in Bradford.
- Margaret McMillan – (1860–1931) Christian Socialist, working in Bradford, who agitated for reforms to improve the health of young children.
- Sophie McShera – actress, played Daisy in Downton Abbey. Born in Bradford.
- Samuel Meekosha – (1893–1950) English recipient of the Victoria Cross. Brought up in Bradford.
- Geoff Mellor – (1920–99) English writer and showbusiness historian. Born and lived in Bradford.
- Edward Mercer – (1857–1922) Archdeacon of Macclesfield and Bishop of Tasmania.
- Olivia Messer (Olive) – (1928–2011) first Jewish woman to become a Lord Mayor of Bradford. During the mid-1980s and at the time of the Bradford City fire disaster, Mayor Messer was key to the laying down of a fund which would benefit the victims and their families.
- Jennifer Metcalfe – (born 1983) actress, most notable for her role as Mercedes McQueen in Hollyoaks, born in Bradford.
  Lord Mayor Jacob Moser, 1910
- Gertie Millar (later Countess of Dudley) (21 February 1879 – 25 April 1952) was an English actress and singer of the early 20th century, known for her performances in Edwardian musical comedies, born in Bradford.
- Robert Milligan – (10 October 1786 – 1 July 1862) English Liberal Party politician and the first mayor of Bradford.
- Austin Mitchell – (born 1934) MP for Great Grimsby, born in Baildon.
- Sir Henry Mitchell – (1824–1898) founder of Bradford Technical School, Mayor and first Freeman of the city. Born in Esholt.
- Captain Sir Thomas Moore (30 April 1920 – 2 February 2021), popularly known as "Captain Tom", was a British Army officer and centenarian, known for his achievements raising money for charity in the run-up to his 100th birthday during the COVID-19 pandemic. Born in Keighley.
- Adrian Moorhouse – (born 1964) former swimmer and Olympic gold medal winner, born in Bradford.
- Sir Kenneth Morrison – (20 October 1931 – 1 February 2017) Life President and former chairman of Wm Morrison Supermarkets plc, born in Bradford.
- Florence Moser – (1856–1921) established the 'City Guild of Help' in the town, a form of organised help for the poor and distressed of Bradford. Florence also ran an establishment called 'the Nest' for mothers to leave their babies and young children for the day. Florence was a philanthropist.
- Jacob Moser – (1839–1922) Lord Mayor and chief magistrate of Bradford. Alongside his work in his textile export business, Jacob was a founder of the Bradford Charity Organisation Society and the City Guild of Help.
- Roger Mosey – (born 1958) British broadcasting executive, born in Bradford.

== N ==
- William Napier – (1828–1908) English recipient of the Victoria Cross. Born in Keighley.
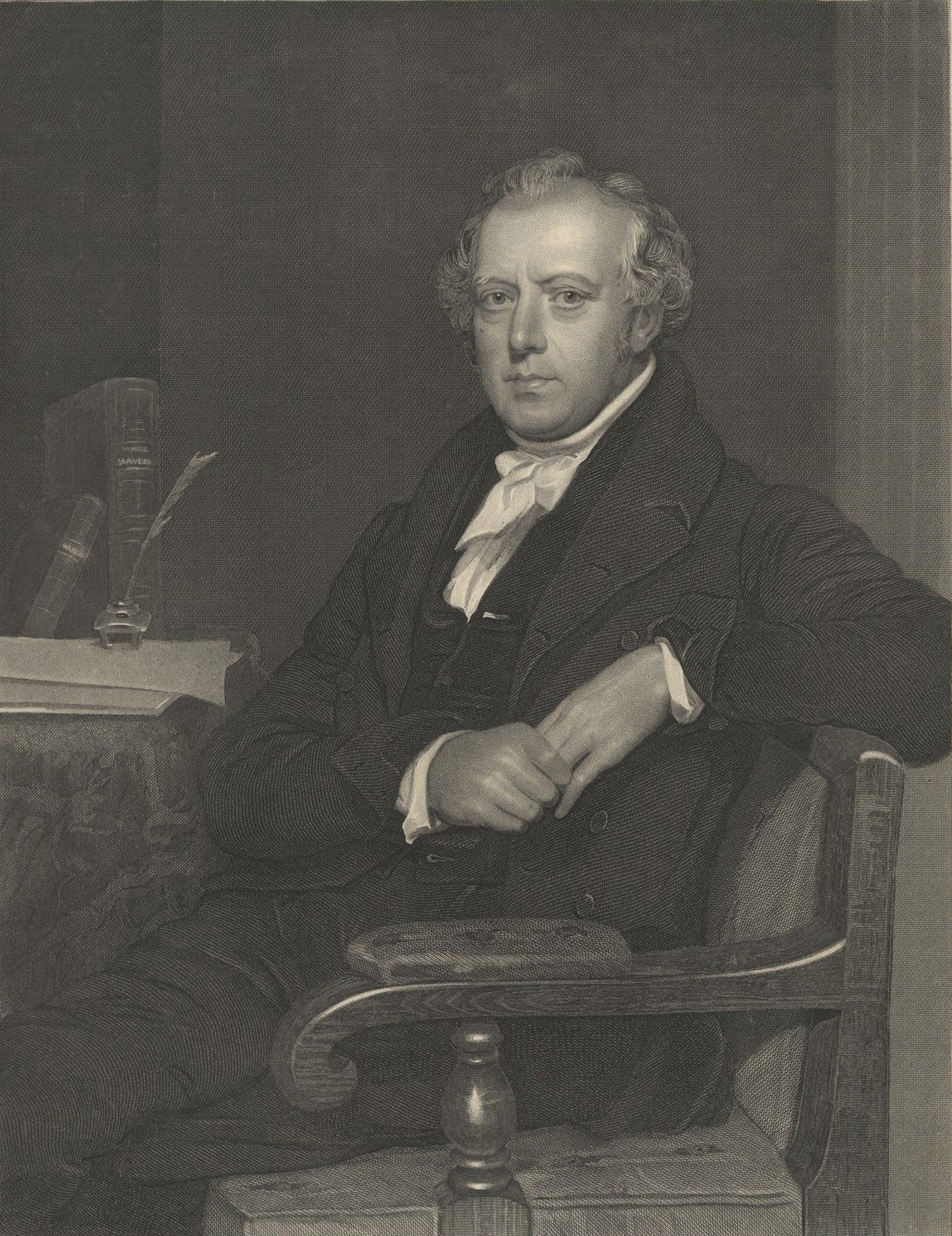
  Richard Oastler
- Frank Newbould – (24 September 1887 – 24 December 1951) was an English poster artist, known for his travel posters and Second World War posters for the War Office. Born in Bradford.
- Brian Noble – (born 1961) former professional rugby league footballer who played for and coached Bradford Bulls and captained and coached the Great Britain squad.
- Chris Norman (born 1950 in Redcar) rock singer and guitarist who was a founding member of the Bradford glam rock band, Smokie.

== O ==
- Richard Oastler – born in Leeds (1789–1861) English labour reformer and abolitionist, who is commemorated for his work fighting for the rights of working children by a statue in Northgate, Bradford.
- Ian Ormondroyd, born 1964, footballer who played for Bradford City, as well as Thackley, born in Bradford.
- Frank O'Rourke (footballer) – (1878–1954) Scottish footballer who played for Bradford City and Scotland. He held the club's goalscoring record for 69 years until Bobby Campbell broke it in October 1984.

== P ==
- Megan Parkinson (born 1996) actress and writer. Best known as Sam Murgatroyd in Ackley Bridge. Born in Silsden, Bradford
- Pat Paterson (born Eliza Paterson; 10 April 1910 – 24 August 1978) was an English film actress. Born in Bradford.
- Diana Patrick – (1878–1964), novelist and poet, born in Bradford.
- Heather Peace – (born 1975) actress and musician, born in Bradford.
- Lloyd Pearson – (1897–1966) actor, born in Bradford.
- Edward Peel 1943--(actor) appeared in the Sweeney/Minder
- Louisa Pesel (1870–1947) was born in Bradford, the daughter of Bradford textile merchant Frederick Robert Pesel and his wife, Isabella. She was educated at Bradford Girls Grammar School. Pesel was a teacher of the art of embroidery.
- Edward Petherbridge – (born 1936) English actor, writer and artist. Born in Bradford.
- Gloria De Piero – (born 21 December 1972) British Labour Party politician, journalist and TV presenter who became known for her work at GMTV. In 2010, she was returned to Parliament as MP for Ashfield. Born in Bradford.
- Albert Pierrepoint – (1905–1992) executioner, born in Clayton.
- Steve Pinnell – drummer with the rock band Smokie.
- Ces Podd – (born 1952) retired international footballer from Saint Kitts and Nevis who started his professional career playing for Bradford City FC, with whom he made a record 565 appearances over 14 years.
- Wilhelm Norbert Pollack – (1868–1916) chairman of Bradford City FC through its most successful period and did much to keep the club solvent through the early years of the first world war. Pollack of German descent also ran a successful textile business in the city. Lived in Bradford.
- Nima Poovaya-Smith – curator, art historian and writer.
- Andrew-Lee Potts – (born 1979) actor, born in Bradford.
- Sarah-Jane Potts – (born 1976) actress, born in Bradford.
- Duncan Preston – (born 1946) actor probably best known for his appearances in television productions written by Victoria Wood. He was born in Eccleshill, Bradford.
- Antony Price – (born 1945) London fashion designer. Born in Keighley.
- Karl Pryce (born 1986), Rugby League player from Bradford Bulls, born in Bradford.
- Leon Pryce (born 1981), Rugby League player from Bradford Bulls, born in Bradford.
- J.B. Priestley – (1894–1984) novelist, playwright and broadcaster, born in Bradford.

== R ==
- Euan Rabagliati – (1892–1978) pilot, racecar driver and was later recruited by MI6 during World War II serving as head for the Netherlands and Denmark. He shot down the first German plane in World War I. Born in Bradford.
- Arthur Raistrick – (1896–1991) British geologist, archaeologist, academic, and writer. He was born in Saltaire, Shipley.
- Anita Rani – (born Ahita Rahi Nazran; 1977 in Bradford) English radio and television presenter and journalist.
- Adil Rashid – (born 1988) cricketer, born in Bradford, who plays for Yorkshire CCC and for England.
- Berthold Reif – (1862–1937) born in, Butschowitz, Czechoslovakia, said to have had the "Spice of Adventure", the last of the Jewish wool merchants to establish a textile export house in the city.
- Michael Rennie – (1909–1971) film, television, and stage actor, perhaps best known for his starring role as the space visitor Klaatu in the 1951 classic science fiction film The Day the Earth Stood Still. He was born in Idle.
- Dean Richards – (1974–2011) professional footballer who was born in Bradford. He played for Bradford City, Wolverhampton Wanderers, Southampton, Tottenham Hotspur and England U21.
- Tony Richardson – born in Shipley (1928–1991) theatre and film director and producer, who won two Oscars for his film, Tom Jones. He was born in Shipley.
- Geoffrey Richmond – (born 1940 or 1941) chairman of Bradford City AFC from 1994 to 2002, the most successful era for the club since before the First World War. He was instrumental in developing Valley Parade into a modern all seater stadium.
- Sam Riley – (born 8 January 1980) English actor and singer. Born in Menston.
- William Riley – (1866–1961) English novelist. He was born in Laisterdyke, Bradford.
- Sir Henry William Ripley, 1st Baronet – (23 April 1813 – 9 November 1882) British businessman, philanthropist and politician.
- Gladys Roberts (c. 1887/1888–1975), Suffragette, born in Bradford.
- Vinette Robinson – (born 1981) actress, born in Bradford.
- Sir William Rothenstein – (1872–1945) English painter, draughtsman and writer on art, born in Bradford.
- David Roper actor, b.1944
- Simon Rouse – (b.1951)actor
- Verity Rushworth – (born 1985) actress, born in Bradford, who is best known for her role as Donna Windsor-Dingle in the ITV1 soap Emmerdale.
- Albert Rutherston – (1881–1953) born in Bradford, and was a painter of figures and landscapes, book illustrator and designer of posters and stage sets.

== S ==
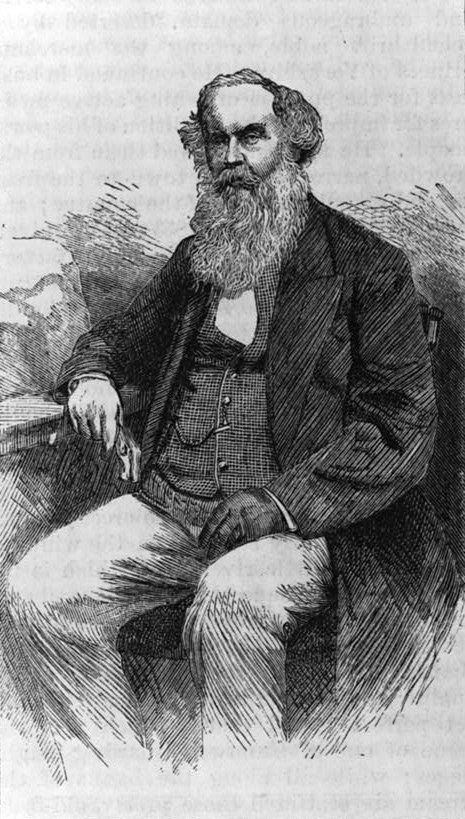
Sir Titus Salt

- Sir Titus Salt, 1st Baronet – (1803–1876) manufacturer, politician and philanthropist in Bradford.
- Leslie Sands – (1921–2001) actor
- Danny Sapko – (b.1993) musician and YouTuber.
- Boris Schapiro – (22 August 1909 – 1 December 2002) British international bridge player. He was a Grandmaster of the World Bridge Federation, and the only player to have won both the Bermuda Bowl (the world championship for teams) and the World Senior Pairs championship.
- George Adolphus Schott – (1868–1937) mathematician, born in Bradford. He is best known for developing the full theory of radiation from electrons travelling at close to the speed of light.
- Alfred Angas Scott – (1875–1923) motorcycle designer, inventor and founder of the Scott Motorcycle Company. Born in Bradford.
- Charles Semon – (1814–1877) became the first foreign and Jewish mayor of Bradford in 1864, and was instrumental in forming The Jewish Association of Bradford in 1873.
- Carl Serrant, born 1975, footballer
- Len Shackleton – (1922–2000) footballer, born in Bradford. Known as the Clown Prince of Football, he is generally regarded as one of English football's finest ever entertainers.
- William Shackleton – (1872–1933) painter of subject pictures and landscapes. Born in Bradford. Studied at Bradford Grammar School and Bradford Technical College and was awarded a Royal Exhibition to the Royal College of Art in 1893.
- Abraham Sharp – (1653–1742) mathematician and astronomer, born in Horton Hall, Little Horton. Calculated pi to 72 places of decimals.
- John Sharp – (1643–1714) born in Bradford and became the Archbishop of York.
- Professor David Sharpe – founded the Bradford Burns Unit after he received many of the burns victims from the Bradford Fire Disaster in 1985.
- Harold Watkins Shaw – (1911–1996) musicologist and educator best known for his critical edition of Handel's Messiah. He was born in Bradford.

Mayor Charles Semon, 1864

- James Shaw – (1826–1892) bellfounder, whose company 'James Shaw Son & Co, Bradford' (1848-c1913) became, during the 1880s, the largest manufacturer of musical handbells in the world. They also caste tower bells and manufactured clocks.
- Ernest Leopold Sichel – (1862–1941) born in Bradford and was a painter, sculptor and silversmith, who exhibited at the Royal Academy.
- Alan Silson – rock musician who grew up in Bradford and was a founder member of the Bradford band Smokie.
- Jonathan Silver – (1949–1997) entrepreneur, born in Bradford, who was instrumental in bringing Salts Mill back to life.
- Teddy Sinclair (née Cappuccini; born 15 August 1986), is an English singer, songwriter and actress. Born in Bradford.
- Jacob Smillie (born 16 September 1998), is an English rugby union & rugby league player and American football player. Born in Bradford.
- Harvey Smith – (born 1938) former British show jumping champion, born in Bingley.
- Alan Smithson – (1936–2010) Bishop of Jarrow from 1990 to 2001. He was educated at Bradford Grammar School. Born in Bradford.
- Pete Spencer – drummer and founder member of the Bradford band Smokie.
- Jimmy Speirs – (1886–1917) Scottish footballer who scored the winning goal for Bradford City FC in the 1911 FA cup final. He was killed during the Battle of Passchendaele in the First World War.
- Edward Spurr – (1907–1998) inventor who was brought up in Eccleshill. He designed a powerboat engine with Lawrence of Arabia, worked on the Dambusters’ bouncing bomb and Frank Whittle's jet engine.
- Melissa Steel (born 1993), singer.
- Norman Stevens – (1937–1988) artist born in Bradford, he was made an Associate of the Royal Academy in 1983 and then a Royal Academician in 1987.
- Joseph Strauss – (1845–1922) was born in Germany, but lived in Bradford where he became the first Rabbi at the Bradford Reform Synagogue in 1873. He was appointed lecturer in Hebrew and Oriental languages at the Airedale Independent College, Bradford in 1876.
- Mollie Sugden – (1922–2009) comedy actress, best known for playing Mrs Slocombe in Are You Being Served?. Born in Keighley.

== T ==
- Mary Tamm – (22 March 1950 – 26 July 2012) British actress, born in Bradford.
- James Tavernier – (born 31 October 1991) English footballer who plays as a right-back for Scottish Championship club Rangers.
- Benson Taylor – (born 1983) born in Bradford and is a Film & TV composer.
- Charlotte Thompson – (1843–1898) born in Bradford and emigrated to the U.S. as a child where she became an actress
- Alan Titchmarsh – (born 1949) gardener, broadcaster and novelist. Born in Ilkley.
- Nick Toczek – (born 1950) writer and poet, born in Shipley.
- Jack Toll – (1914–1972) footballer, with Bridlington Town and Burnley.
- Jack Tordoff – Chairman of the Bradford-based car dealership JCT600. Born in Bradford.
- Bob Torrance – (died 1917) Scottish footballer and member of the 1911 Bradford City FC cup winning side. He was killed in action during the First World War.
- John Turner (1800–1883), ran a successful draper's shop next for the former Old Bowling Green Inn on the corner of Bridge Street and Great Horton Road. This is where he first showed symptoms of the miserliness which later made him notorious – and very rich.
- Professor Robert Turner – (1923–1990) pathologist who came to Bradford from Belfast, and pioneered the use of chemotherapy in the treatment of cancer at the Bradford Royal Infirmary.
- Stephanie Turner born in Bradford 1944 is an actress known for her role in Juliet Bravo and as the wife of George Carter (Dennis Waterman) in The Sweeney

== U ==
- Jacob Unna – (1800–1881) born in Hamburg, but became one of Bradford's leading industrialists and a founder of the Bradford Chamber of Commerce in 1851.
- Terry Uttley – rock musician who attended St. Bede's Grammar School as a boy, and became a founder member of the Bradford band, Smokie.

== V ==
- Bobby Vanzie – (born 15 August 1975) former English professional boxer who won the British lightweight title, and Commonwealth lightweight title. Vanzie defended his British lightweight title successfully twice, winning a British Lonsdale Belt outright. Born in Bradford.
- Julia Varley, (born 1871 in Bradford, Yorkshire, England; died 1952 in Yorkshire) was an English trade unionist and suffragette.
- John Verity – (born 1949) English Blues Rock guitarist. He formed the John Verity Band, and also played with the band Argent from 1973 to 1976. Born in Bradford.
- Alberta Vickridge – (1890–1963) poet, won a Bard's Crown and Bardic Chair at an Eisteddfod in 1924 for her extended poem, the Forsaken Princess. Born in Bradford.
- Gillian Vogelsang-Eastwood (born 1950) – a Dutch textile historian. Grew up in Bradford.

== W ==
The fourth photograph, Fairy Offering Posy of Harebells to Elsie Wright

- Abe Waddington – (1893–1959) professional cricketer, born in Clayton. He played cricket for Yorkshire and England.
- Scott Waites – (born 17 February 1977 in Bradford, Yorkshire) English professional darts player and is a former BDO World Darts Champion having won the 2016 and 2013 tournaments.
- Harold Walden – (10 October 1887 – 2 December 1955) English amateur football player who competed in the 1912 Summer Olympics. He won a gold medal and is the record Olympic goalscorer for the Great Britain football team.
- Kimberley Walsh – (born 1981) born in Bradford and is a singer with the pop group, Girls Aloud.
- Sally Walsh, born 1979, actress starred in Emmerdale, born in Bradford.
- Timothy West – (1934–2024) film, stage and television actor, Brass. He also played Sir Thomas Beecham in Beecham TV drama, born in Bradford.
- Marjorie Olive Whitaker (1895–1976), better known under her pseudonym Malachi Whitaker, was an English writer. Born in Bradford.
- Frank Whitcombe – (1913–1958) Welsh rugby union, and rugby league footballer of the 1930s and 1940s
- Frank Whitcombe Jr – (1936–2009) rugby union footballer of the 1950s, 1960s and 1970s
- Martin Whitcombe – (born 1961) English rugby union footballer
- Billie Whitelaw – (1932–2014) English actress of both stage and film. She was educated at Thornton Grammar School.
- Richard Whiteley – (1943–2005) television presenter remembered as the original host of the game show, Countdown. He was born in Bradford.
- George Whyte-Watson – (1908–1974) senior consultant surgeon at Bradford Royal Infirmary for nearly 30 years. He was instrumental in getting self-examination included as part of the procedure for detecting breast cancer.
- Sir Alan Wilson – professor, mathematician, geographer, entrepreneur, and social scientist, who co-founded GMAP (Geographical Modelling and Planning), was the vice-chancellor of the University of Leeds.
- Maurice Wilson – (21 April 1898 – 1934) British soldier, mystic, mountaineer and aviator who is known for his ill-fated attempt to climb Mount Everest alone in 1934. Born in Bradford.
- Ricky Wilson – (born 1978) lead singer with Leeds band, Kaiser Chiefs. He was born in Keighley.
- Henry Winkelmann – (1860–1931) photographer who emigrated to New Zealand, born at 8 Melbourne Place. Winkelmann's glass-plate negatives of early New Zealand were inscribed on the UNESCO Memory of the World Aotearoa New Zealand Ngā Mahara o te Ao register in 2023.
- Ron Wing – (1927–2005) leading pharmacist who launched Ibuprofen and was instrumental in providing new treatments for epilepsy. He studied as an apprentice at Bradford Technical College from 1942 to 1947.
- Junior Witter – (born 1974) Bradford's first ever World Boxing Champion. He is the former British Welterweight champion and former WBC World Light-Welterweight champion, and has been a European, British and Commonwealth Light-Welterweight champion. Born in Bradford.
- Humbert Wolfe – (1885–1940) Italian-born English poet, man of letters and civil servant. He was brought up in Bradford and was a pupil at Bradford Grammar School.
- Sir Walter Womersley – (1878–1961) Minister of Pensions in World War II. Born in Bradford.
- David Wootton – (born 1950) born in Bradford and was a pupil at Bradford Grammar School. He was the 684th Lord Mayor of London, from 2011 to 2012 and is the Alderman of the Ward of Aldersgate.
- Elsie Wright – (1901–1988) whose photographs of the Cottingley Fairies were endorsed authentic by Sir Arthur Conan Doyle, was a student of Bradford Art College. Elsie was born in Cottingley.
- Joseph Wright – (31 October 1855 – 27 February 1930) English philologist who rose from humble origins to become Professor of Comparative Philology at Oxford University.
- Tony Wright – (born 1968) born in Bradford and is a rock singer with the band, Terrorvision.
