= Timeline of Bradford =

Timeline of Bradford, West Yorkshire, England

Coordinates: 53.8°N 1.75206°W

The following is a timeline of the history of the city of Bradford, West Yorkshire, England.

== Prior to 19th century ==
- 1251 – Market active.
- 1294
  - Bradford fair active.
  - Henry de Lacy, Earl of Lincoln granted a weekly market on Thursdays.
- 1458 – Oldest parts of Bradford Cathedral completed.
- 1548 – Bradford Grammar School founded.
- 1642 – Attempted siege of town by Royalists.
- 1663 – Free Grammar School incorporated.
- 1760 – Bradford Club (business club) formed (approximate date).
- 1773 – Piece Hall built.
- 1774
  - Bradford Canal completed.
  - Subscription library established.
- 1784 – Airedale College founded.
- 1788 – Bowling Iron Works in business.
- 1791 – Low Moor Ironworks established near town.

== 19th century ==
=== 1800–1849 ===
- 1801 – Population: 13,264.
- 1816 – 21 April: Charlotte Brontë, novelist and poet, born in Thornton on the outskirts of Bradford.
- 1817 – 26 June: Branwell Brontë, painter, writer and poet born in Thornton.
- 1818 – 30 July: Emily Brontë, novelist and poet, born in Thornton.
- 1820 – 17 January: Anne Brontë, novelist and poet, born in Thornton
- 1821
  - Bradford Gaslight Company and Bradford Musical Friendly Society founded.
  - George Ripley & Son dyeworks in business near town, in Bowling.
- 1822 – April: Labour unrest.
- 1824 – Market-place opens.
- 1825 – Labour strike.
- 1830
  - Exchange buildings open.
  - Bradford Grammar School rebuilt.
- 1831 – Population: 23,223.
- 1832
  - Bradford becomes a parliamentary borough.
  - Bradford Mechanics' Institute established.
- 1834 – Bradford Observer newspaper begins publication.
- 1836 – Sir Titus Salt develops the alpaca manufacture.
- 1838
  - Jacob Behrens moves to Bradford, opening a factory in Thornton Road.
  - Lister Mills founded in Manningham.
- 1839 – Philosophical Society established.
- 1841 – Population: 34,560.
- 1844 – Bradford Moor Barracks completed
- 1846 – 1 July: Leeds and Bradford Railway begins operating.
- 1847 – Bradford municipal borough charter granted, uniting townships of Bowling, Bradford, Horton, Manningham.
- 1848
  - Bradford Borough Police established (did not become City Police until 1897).
  - Titus Salt becomes mayor.

=== 1850–1899 ===
- 1850 – Bradford Exchange railway station opened.
- 1851 – Bradford Chamber of Commerce founded.
- 1853
  - St George's Hall (auditorium) and Peel Park opened.
  - Salts Mill built near town, in Saltaire.
- 1855 – Bradford Advertiser newspaper begins publication.
- 1856
  - Bradford Festival Choral Society established.
  - Henry Brown becomes mayor.
- 1858
  - October: 1858 Bradford sweets poisoning.
  - Bradford Review newspaper begins publication.
- 1859 – Isaac Wright becomes mayor.
- 1860 – 2nd Yorkshire (West Riding) Artillery Volunteer Corps formed.
- 1862 – Frederick Delius, CH, composer, born in Bradford.
- 1863 – Original Bradford Rugby Club founded by Oates Ingham, owner of a Dye works in Thornton Road.
- 1864
  - All-Saints' Church consecrated.
  - Textile exporter Charles Semon becomes the first foreign-born and Jewish mayor of Bradford.
- 1865
  - Holy Trinity Church built.
  - Springfield Soap Works in business.
- 1866 – Construction of Ripley Ville "model village" commenced.
- 1867 – Wool Exchange building constructed.
- 1868 – Bradford Daily Telegraph newspaper begins publication.
- 1871
  - Bradford Free Library established.
  - Population: 145,830 (municipal borough).
- 1872
  - 29 January: William Rothenstein, painter, draughtsman and author, born in Bradford.
  - December: St Bartholomew's Church in Ripley Ville consecrated.
- 1873 – Bradford Town Hall and Mechanics' Institute building constructed.
- 1874 – Friederich Wilhelm Eurich, a professor of forensic medicine and bacteriologist who does much to conquer the disease of anthrax in the wool trade, moves to Bradford.
- 1875
  - Lister Park opens.
  - Bradford Naturalists' Society founded.
  - Bradford Grammar School for Girls founded.
- 1877 – Briggs Priestley becomes mayor.
- 1878
  - Bradford Historical and Antiquarian Society founded.
  - Angus Holden becomes mayor.
  - Horton Park opens.
- 1879 – Art Gallery and Museum established in Darley Street.
- 1880
  - Bowling Park opens.
  - Swan Arcade built.
- 1881
  - Bradford Reform Synagogue is opened.
  - Population: 183,032 (municipal borough).
- 1882
  - Bradford Technical College established.
  - Bradford Photographic Society and Bradford Microscopical Society founded.
- 1884 – Bradford Moor Park opens.
- 1885 – Harold Park and Wibsey park open.
- 1886 – Valley Parade Stadium opens.
- 1887 – Post-Office established in Forster Square.
- 1888 – United Yorkshire Independent College formed.
- 1890 – December: Manningham Mills labour strike begins.
- 1891
  - Conditioning House established.
  - April: Labour unrest.
  - Population: 265,728.
- 1892 – Edward Appleton, physicist and Nobel prizewinner who discovers the ionosphere, born in Bradford
- 1893 – Independent Labour Party founded.
- 1894 – 13 September: J. B. Priestley, OM, novelist, playwright and broadcaster born in Bradford.
- 1895 – Bradford Rugby Club is one of 22 clubs to secede from Rugby Football Union to form Northern Rugby Union (later Rugby Football League)
- 1896 – Manningham F.C. become the first champions on the newly formed Northern Rugby Football Union.
- 1897
  - Bradford attains city status.
  - Bradford Dyers' Association founded.
  - First electric tram service runs on 30 July to Bolton Junction.
  - Bradford power station (an electricity generating station) commissioned.

== 20th century ==
=== 1900–1949 ===
- 1901 – Population: 279,767.
- 1903 – Bradford City Football Club formed.
- 1904
  - Cartwright Hall opened.
  - Bradford Exhibition held.
  - Jowett Motor Manufacturing Company in business.
- 1906 – Bradford RLFC reach Challenge Cup Final for first time, beating Salford RLFC 5–0 at Headingley Stadium.
- 1907
  - 15 April: Bradford Rugby Club splits ("The Great Betrayal"): Bradford Park Avenue Association Football Club and Bradford Northern Northern Rugby Football Union (league) are created.
  - 28 October: First organised British school meal service for all pupils, a dinner of scotch barley broth and fruit tart, served to pupils at Green Lane Primary School in Manningham, by headmaster Jonathan Priestley (father of J. B. Priestley).
- 1908
  - Bradford City Football Club are promoted to the First Tier of the English Football League as Champions.
  - The Scott Motorcycle Company founded.
- 1909
  - Trial of May Wilson (also known as Clement Mitchell), a deserter from the Seaforth Highlanders, who appeared in court dressed as a woman, since she had been living as one since she left the army
- 1910
  - Jacob Moser becomes Lord Mayor of Bradford and Chief Magistrate.
  - Picturedrome opens.
- 1911
  - 26 April: Bradford City Football Club win the FA Cup (in a replay in Manchester). This is the first time a new trophy, made by Fattorini and Sons of Bradford, is awarded.
  - 20 June: Trolleybuses in Bradford officially begin operation.
- 1914 – Bradford Alhambra theatre and Birch Lane Cinema open.
- 1915 – Fred Hoyle, astronomer and mathematician, born in Bingley.
- 1916
  - 1 July: An estimated 1,394 young men from Bradford and District (The Bradford Pals, the 16th and 18th Battalions of the Prince of Wales's Own West Yorkshire Regiment) leave their trenches in Northern France to advance across No Man's Land, in the first hour of the first day of the Battle of the Somme.
  - 21–24 August: Low Moor Explosion: A series of explosions at a munitions factory kills 40 people and injures over 100.
- 1919 – The Diocese of Bradford is founded and the Church of Saint Peter is elevated to cathedral status.
- 1923 – Coronet Picture House opens.
- 1929
  - Bradford Playhouse Company formed.
  - Bradford City Football Club are promoted to the second tier of English Football as Champions.
- 1930 – New Victoria Cinema opens.
- 1931 – Leeds and Bradford Municipal Aerodrome opens.
- 1933 – Bradford Northern sign a ten-year lease on former quary and household waste site, beginning construction of Odsal Stadium the largest British stadium other than Wembley Stadium.
- 1937 – 9 July: David Hockney, CH, RA, painter, draughtsman, printmaker, stage designer and photographer, born in Bradford
- 1939
  - Carlton Hostel building bought and funded by both Bradford's Jewish community and non-Jews, as part of the Kindertransport scheme, to house German Jewish refugee children throughout the years of the Second World War.
  - The Challenge Cup semi-final between Halifax RLFC, and Leeds RLFC held at Odsal Stadium. Record-breaking 64,453 people see Halifax win.
- 1944 – Bradford Northern win Challenge Cup beating Wigan RLFC over two legs (Wigan 0–3 Bradford Northern at Central Park and Bradford Northern 5–0 Wigan at Odsal Stadium).
- 1945 – Bradford Northern again reach Challenge Cup Final but are beaten over two legs by Huddersfield RLFC (Huddersfield 7–4 Bradford Northern at Fartown Ground and Bradford Northern 5–6 Huddersfield at Odsal Stadium.
- 1947 – Bradford Northern beat Leeds RLFC 8–4 in Challenge Cup Final at Wembley Stadium.
- 1948 – Bradford Northern reach final of Challenge Cup, but fail to keep hold of the trophy losing to Wigan RLFC 8–3 at Wembley Stadium.
- 1949 – Bradford Northern reach Challenge Cup Final for the third year running, beating Halifax RLFC 12–0 at Wembley Stadium.

=== 1950–1999 ===
- 1954 – Odsal Stadium hosts the replay of the Challenge Cup final. A record-breaking crowd of 102,569 (official but estimates put number at over 120,000)) see Warrington RLFC defeat Halifax RLFC 8–4.
- 1961 – Morrisons open their first supermarket, 'Victoria' in Girlington.
- 1963 – Bradford Northern goes out of business.
- 1964 – Bradford Northern reformed and accepted back into Rugby Football League.
- 1966 – University of Bradford chartered.
- 1972 – 26 March: Trolleybuses in Bradford cease operation, the last system in the UK.
- 1973 – Bradford Exchange railway station closed.
- 1974 – City of Bradford local government district created, combining Bingley, Bradford, Denholme, Haworth, Ilkley, Keighley, Shipley, Silsden.
- 1982 – Bradford and Ilkley Community College, and Peace Action Group formed.
- 1983 – National Science and Media Museum opens as The National Museum of Photography, Film & Television.
- 1985
  - 11 May: Bradford City stadium fire.
  - Mohammed Ajeeb becomes Lord Mayor.
  - Bradford City Football Club are promoted to the second tier of English football (later called the Championship) as Champions.
- 1987 – Jonathan Silver buys Salts Mill as a commercial, retail and cultural venue and opens the 1853 Gallery here.
- 1992 – Pictureville Cinema opens.
- 1993 – Bradford Animation Festival begins.
- 1994 – Railways to Bradford electrified.
- 1995
  - Bradford International Film Festival begins.
  - Bradford Northern changes name to Bradford Bulls with advent of Super League.
  - June: Manningham riot.
- 1996
  - Bradford City Football Club make their first ever appearance at Wembley Stadium when winning the 3rd tier (now called the 1st division) playoff final.
  - Bradford Bulls return to Wembley Stadium, losing the Challenge Cup Final again St. Helens RLFC 40–32. Robbie Paul became the first man to score a hat trick at Wembley and then won the Lance Todd Trophy.
- 1997 – Bradford Bulls win their first Super League title, including a record-breaking 20 straight victories, and are beaten Challenge Cup finalists.
- 1998 – Infest (festival) begins.
- 1999
  - Bradford City Football Club are promoted to the Premier League.
  - Super League record attendance is beaten with 24,020 watching Bradford Bulls beat Leeds Rhinos 19–18 at Odsal Stadium.
  - A further Super League record is broken as 50,717 see St. Helens RLFC defeat Bradford Bulls 8–6 at Old Trafford Stadium.
- 2000 – Bradford Bulls win Challenge Cup for first time in over 50 years, beating Leeds Rhinos 24–18 at Murrayfield Stadium in Edinburgh (due to rebuilding work at Wembley Stadium).

== 21st century ==
- 2001
  - Saltaire village becomes a UNESCO World Heritage Site.
  - April: Bradford Bulls are beaten finalists in Challenge Cup, losing 13 – 6 to St. Helens RLFC at Twickenham Stadium.
  - May: Bradford Bulls player Henry Paul sets a new world record for consecutive goal kicks (35).
  - July: Ethnic unrest.
  - October: After finishing as Minor Premiers, Bradford Bulls become Premiers, defeating Wigan Warriors 37–6 at Old Trafford.
  - Population: 467,665 (City of Bradford metropolitan district).
- 2002 – Bradford Bulls become World Club Challenge champions, defeating Newcastle Knights 41–26 at Alfred McAlpine Stadium.
- 2003
  - Saltaire Festival begins in Shipley.
  - Bradford Bulls have most successful season in the Super League history by all possible trophies at once. They win Challenge Cup by defeating Leeds Rhinos 22 – 20 at Cardiff's Millennium Stadium; are named Minor Premiers; and win the Grand Final beating Wigan Warriors 25 – 12 at Old Trafford. Thanks to the Challenge Cup win, they become the first team to win the cup in three different countries and at three different national stadia.
- 2004 – Bradford Bulls become World Club Challenge champions, defeating the Penrith Panthers 22–4 at Alfred McAlpine Stadium.
- 2005 – Bradford Bulls become the first team to win the Super League Grand Final from third in the league, beating the Leeds Rhinos 15 – 6 at Old Trafford.
- 2006
  - Born in Bradford health study begins.
  - February: Bradford Bulls win the World Club Challenge for the third time by defeating Wests Tigers 30–10 at Alfred McAlpine Stadium.
- 2008 – Al Mahdi Mosque inaugurated.
- 2009 – Bradford becomes the world's first UNESCO City of Film.
- 2011 – Population: 522,452
- 2012
  - Bradford City Park opens.
  - British Wool Marketing Board building constructed.
- 2013
  - Bradford City Football Club reach the League Cup Final. The first fourth-tier club ever, to reach a major Wembley Cup final.
  - Bradford City Football Club is promoted to League One by winning the Wembley League Two playoff final.
- 2014 – The Bradford College David Hockney building opens its doors.
- 2015 – The Broadway Shopping Mall opens.
- 2016 – Sunbridge Wells Underground leisure and retail facility opens.
- 2025 – Bradford is the 2025 UK City of Culture.

== See also ==
- History of Bradford
- List of Lord Mayors of Bradford
- List of people from Bradford
- Grade I listed buildings in Bradford
- City of Bradford
- Timelines of other cities in Yorkshire and the Humber: Hull, Sheffield, York

== Bibliography ==
=== Published in 19th century ===
==== 1800s–1840s ====
- Bigland, John (1812), "Bradford", Yorkshire, Beauties of England and Wales, vol. 16, London: J. Harris, hdl:2027/hvd.hxjf83
- Dugdale, James (1819), "Yorkshire: Bradford", New British Traveller, vol. 4, London: J. Robins and Co.
- "Bradford". History, Directory & Gazetteer, of the County of York. Vol. 1. Leeds: E. Baines. 1822.
- "Yorkshire: Bradford and Neighborhood". Pigot & Co.'s National Commercial Directory for 1828-9. London: James Pigot. 1828.
- Brewster, David, ed. (1830). "Bradford". Edinburgh Encyclopædia. Edinburgh: William Blackwood.
- Tymms, Samuel (1837). "Yorkshire: West Riding". Northern Circuit. The Family Topographer: Being a Compendious Account of the ... Counties of England. Vol. 6. London: J.B. Nichols and Son. OCLC 2127940.
- "Bradford", History, Gazetteer, and Directory, of the West-Riding of Yorkshire, Sheffield: William White, 1837
- James, John (1841), History and Topography of Bradford, London: Longman, Brown, Green, and Longmans
- Lewis, Samuel (1848), "Bradford", Topographical Dictionary of England (7th ed.), London: S. Lewis and Co.

==== 1850s–1890s ====
- Schroder, Henry (1852). "Bradford". Annals of Yorkshire. Leeds: George Crosby.
- Collinson, Edward (1854). "Historic Sketch of the Town of Bradford". History of the Worsted Trade, and Historic Sketch of Bradford. London: J. Watson.
- Measom, George Samuel (1861), "Bradford", Official Illustrated Guide to the Great Northern Railway, London: Griffin, Bohn, OCLC 12433505
- White's Bradford Directory. 1861.
- "Bradford", Black's Picturesque Guide to Yorkshire (2nd ed.), Edinburgh: Adam and Charles Black, 1862
- Jone's Mercantile Bradford Directory. 1863.
- Knight, Charles, ed. (1867). "Bradford". Geography. English Cyclopaedia. London: Bradbury, Evans, & Co.
- Townsend, George Henry (1867), "Bradford", Manual of Dates (2nd ed.), London: Frederick Warne & Co.
- Round about Bradford. 1876.
- Bevan, G. Phillips (1877). "Bradford". Tourist's Guide to the West Riding of Yorkshire. London: Edward Stanford.
- "Bradford Section". Commercial Directory and Shippers' Guide (11th ed.). Liverpool: R.E. Fulton & Co. 1879.
- Cudworth, William (1881), Historical Notes on the Bradford Corporation, Bradford: T. Brear
- Anderson, John Parker (1881), "Yorkshire: Bradford", Book of British Topography: a Classified Catalogue of the Topographical Works in the Library of the British Museum Relating to Great Britain and Ireland, London: W. Satchell
- Cudworth, William (1891), Histories of Bolton and Bowling (Townships of Bradford), Bradford: T. Brear and Co., OL 23605612M
- Gray, Johnnie (1891), "Bradford", Through Airedale from Goole to Malham, Leeds: Walker & Laycock
- Post Office Bradford Directory. 1891.
- "Bradford". Official Guide to the Midland Railway. London: Cassell and Company. 1894.
- Dolman, Frederick (1895), "Bradford", Municipalities at work: the municipal policy of six great towns and its influence on their social welfare, London: Methuen & Co., OCLC 8429493
- Baddeley, Mountford John Byrde (1897). "Bradford". Yorkshire (Part 2): West and Part of North Ridings. Thorough Guides (3rd ed.). London: Dulau & Co.
- Gross, Charles (1897). "Bradford". Bibliography of British Municipal History. New York: Longmans, Green, and Co.
- Fletcher, J. S. (1899), "Bradford", Picturesque History of Yorkshire, vol. 1, London: J.M. Dent

=== Published in 20th century ===
- "Bradford". Chambers's Encyclopaedia. 1901.
- Fortescue, G. K., ed. (1902). "Bradford". Subject Index of the Modern Works Added to the Library of the British Museum in the Years 1881–1900. London. pp. 6 v. hdl:2027/uc1.b5107011.
- "Bradford". Handbook for Yorkshire (4th ed.). London: Edward Stanford. 1904.
- Bartholomew, J. G. (1904), "Bradford", Survey Gazetteer of the British Isles, London: G. Newnes
- Donald, Robert, ed. (1908). "Bradford". Municipal Year Book of the United Kingdom for 1908. London: Edward Lloyd. hdl:2027/nyp.33433081995593.
- "Bradford", Great Britain, Baedeker's Great Britain (7th ed.), Leipzig: Karl Baedeker, 1910, hdl:2027/mdp.39015010546516
- "Bradford (Yorkshire)" . Encyclopædia Britannica. Vol. 4 (11th ed.). 1910. pp. 370–371.
- Vincent, Benjamin (1910), "Bradford", Haydn's Dictionary of Dates (25th ed.), London: Ward, Lock & Co.
- Kelly's Bradford Directory. 1917.
- Muirhead, Findlay, ed. (1920). "Bradford". England. Blue Guides. London: Macmillan.
- Mortimore, M. J. (1969). "Landownership and Urban Growth in Bradford and Its Environs in the West Riding Conurbation, 1850–1950". Transactions of the Institute of British Geographers (46): 105–119. doi:10.2307/621411. JSTOR 621411.
- Blackwell, Ronald (1987). "The Low Moor Explosion". Bradford Antiquary. 3. Bradford Historical and Antiquarian Society.
- Bishop, Anne (1989), "Cartwright Memorial Hall and the Great Bradford Exhibition of 1904", Bradford Antiquary, vol. 4, Bradford Historical and Antiquarian Society
- Russell, David (1989). "Provincial Concerts in England, 1865–1914: A Case-Study of Bradford". Journal of the Royal Musical Association. 114 (1): 43–55. doi:10.1093/jrma/114.1.43. JSTOR 766377.
- Koditschek, Theodore (1990). Class Formation and Urban Industrial Society: Bradford, 1750–1850. Cambridge University Press. ISBN 978-0-521-32771-8.
