= Unna (disambiguation) =

Unna is a town that is the seat of the Unna district.

Unna may also refer to:

== People ==
- Henry of Unna, proctor of the University of Paris in the 14th century
- Jacob Unna (1800–1881), born in Hamburg, of German Jewish descent
- Moshe Unna (1902–1989), Israeli politician
- Paul Gerson Unna (1850–1929), German physician
- Warren Unna (1923–2017), American journalist

== Other uses ==
- Unna (district), a district in the state of North Rhine-Westphalia, Germany
- Unna, a captive orca
- Unna, a long scarf worn by South Asians
- Unna boot, a special gauze bandage
- Unna, a word in Indigenous Australian lexicology meaning "ain't it?"
