= Rudi Leavor =

Jewish community leader (1926–2021)

Rudi Leavor, BEM (31 May 1926 – 27 July 2021) was a Jewish community leader in Bradford, West Yorkshire. He was born in Berlin, Brandenburg, Prussia, Germany. Leavor, along with his parents and sister, left Nazi Germany for Bradford in 1937, when he was 11, all were refugees. He attended Bradford Grammar School, and later Leeds University where he trained to become a dentist. He later had a successful dental practice based in Heckmondwike, West Yorkshire.

Other German Jewish refugees came to Bradford in 1939 as part of a Kindertransport scheme based at the Carlton Hostel in Manningham.

Leavor became President and Chairman of the Bradford Reform Synagogue in 1975, and represented the Bradford Jewish community at civic events in Bradford and further afield. At the age of 86, with the financial assistance of the local Muslim community, he was involved in restoration work on the Grade II listed Bradford Reform Synagogue.

Jani Rashid joined the Synagogue council in January 2015; the council is involved with the administration and operation of the Synagogue. This appointment is thought to be the first for a Muslim. Leavor, Rashid and Zulfi Karim representing the Bradford Council of Mosques worked to strengthen social bonds between the Jewish, Muslim and other communities and faiths in the City of Bradford.

In 2017 Rudi Leavor was awarded the British Empire Medal in the Queen's Birthday's Honours List, for his work with the local Jewish community and in interfaith and community relations.

His death was announced on 27 July 2021.
