= Robert Ashforth =

English rugby union player

Robert Ashforth (born 1 May 1976 (age 48)) is a retired professional rugby player, he had three Cambridge rugby blues, and was an England Rugby player at U16, U18, Colts & Students. He was educated at Bradford Grammar School and Cambridge University. He played for London Irish to the end of the 2001 season, having previously been at Bedford Blues. He has three children.
