= Steve Abbott (film producer) =

British film producer

- Born: July 28, 1954 (age 71); Bradford, West Yorkshire, England
- Education: University of Cambridge
- Occupation: Film producer

Steve Abbott (born 28 July 1954) is a British film producer best known for A Fish Called Wanda, Brassed Off, Fierce Creatures and his affiliation with the Monty Python troupe. Films he has produced have been awarded an Oscar, a Cesar, and several BAFTA awards. He was the Chairman of Bradford UNESCO City of Film.

== Early life and education ==
Steve Abbott grew up in Barkerend Road in the city of Bradford, Yorkshire. He had a scholarship to the Bradford Grammar School, then took his first degree in mathematics at Cambridge with a full grant scholarship. He was an open scholar in Mathematics at the University of Cambridge.

Abbott worked in Baird's factory for ten months, which manufactured televisions. While in Cambridge, he fell in love with cinema and foreign films. In 1976, upon his roommate's suggestion to work as an accountant, Abbott moved to London for a professional qualification in Price Waterhouse. Choosing between a position at Paramount Pictures and EMI Records, Abbott heard about a job at George Harrison's Handmade Films, founded to rescue Monty Python's Life of Brian. Steve Abbott was a big fan of Monty Python troupe and took the job. 18 months later he became the Python's manager.

== Career ==
Steve Abbott started working with Monty Python while he was at Handmade Films in 1979, primarily as their accountant. That same year Steve Abbott became Monty Python's manager with his business partner Anne James. He founded Prominent Features and Prominent Television with John Cleese, Terry Gilliam, Eric Idle, Terry Jones and Michael Palin in 1985.

Under Prominent Features, Steve Abbott produced A Fish Called Wanda, Brassed Off, American Friends, Blame It on the Bellboy and Fierce Creatures. He kept an office at Universal in Los Angeles for over 10 years.

Abbott was the executive producer for Prominent Television's travel series with Michael Palin, and Michael's four-part travel series on BBC1. He has been working with Michael Palin for over 40 years. Abbott arranged the acquisition for Palin's book "Erebus: The Story of a Ship" by Susan Sandon from Cornerstone and Nigel Wilcockson from Random House Books. The book details the story of HMS Erebus and the marine exploration of the Royal Navy in the 19th century.

Steve Abbott is a member of Academy of Motion Picture Arts and Sciences, BAFTA, and the European Film Academy. Steve Abbott was the chair for regional film agency Screen Yorkshire for 9 years.

== Bradford City of Film ==
In 2007, Steve Abbott was appointed as the chair of the world's first UNESCO City of Film committee.

James Bridge, head of the National Commission for UNESCO, said Abbott's work advising cities worldwide, including Qingdao in China, had made Bradford a Best Practice model, “bringing jobs and investment to the city and, most importantly, pride and self belief.” He added: “Being the world’s first City of Film is part of Bradford’s identity. Out there in UNESCO there are 180 Creative Cities, all talking about Bradford.”

He was honoured a "Brafta" award at a civic reception for his work in making Bradford the first City of Film in the world.

The Lord Mayor of Bradford Councillor Doreen Lee, who presented Mr Abbott with his "Brafta" award, said: “This city is famous for producing stars and you’re up there with the best. We are extremely proud of you.” After 10 years as the chair leading successful bids for Bradford City of Film, Abbott resigned from the chairman position, in his words, to make way for "new, younger, more diverse blood".

== Recognition ==
In 1998, Abbott was given an Honorary Doctor of Letters from the University of Bradford. He was also awarded an Honorary Fellow from the Bradford College on 5 December 2012.

== Personal life ==
Steve Abbott is a long-time cricket fan. An NME journalist quoted that Steve Abbott is known for his amazing hair. He has 2 children and 3 step-children including the entrepreneur Harry Cheslaw.
