= Jacob Unna =

British businessman

Jacob Unna (1800 – 1881), was born in Hamburg, of German Jewish descent. Unna was a leading industrialist in Bradford and a leading figure in establishing the town's worsted trade. He was Jacob Behrens' right-hand man, and was instrumental in building Behrens's business into one of the great Bradford textile export houses.

Unna was one of the founders of the Bradford Chamber of Commerce in 1851. He was also a promoter of the establishment of the Bradford District Bank.

Unna was a leading figure in Bradford's Jewish community, laying the foundation stone of the Bradford Reform Synagogue in 1880.

Unna was a philanthropist and promoted the building of the Bradford Eye and Ear Hospital.

Jacob Unna died in 1881. The local paper, the Bradford Observer wrote this obituary on Saturday, 8 January 1881 which stated:

In 1844, two years before any railway was opened to Bradford. Messrs. S.L. Behrens and Co. finally removed their Leeds business to Bradford, since which period up to the year 1870 Mr Unna represented them here as head of the concern. It was largely due to the energy, the keen insight into foreign requirements, and the general business capacity of German gentlemen like Mr Unna that Bradford owed that development of the worsted trade which resulted in its assuming such a position of importance in the commercial history of the world. In private life he was the embodiment of undemonstrative goodness. It is not for us to tell of the good deeds he has done in an unobtrusive manner. Few men of his means have probably given away so much in this way, and with so much discretion."
