= John Venimore Godwin =

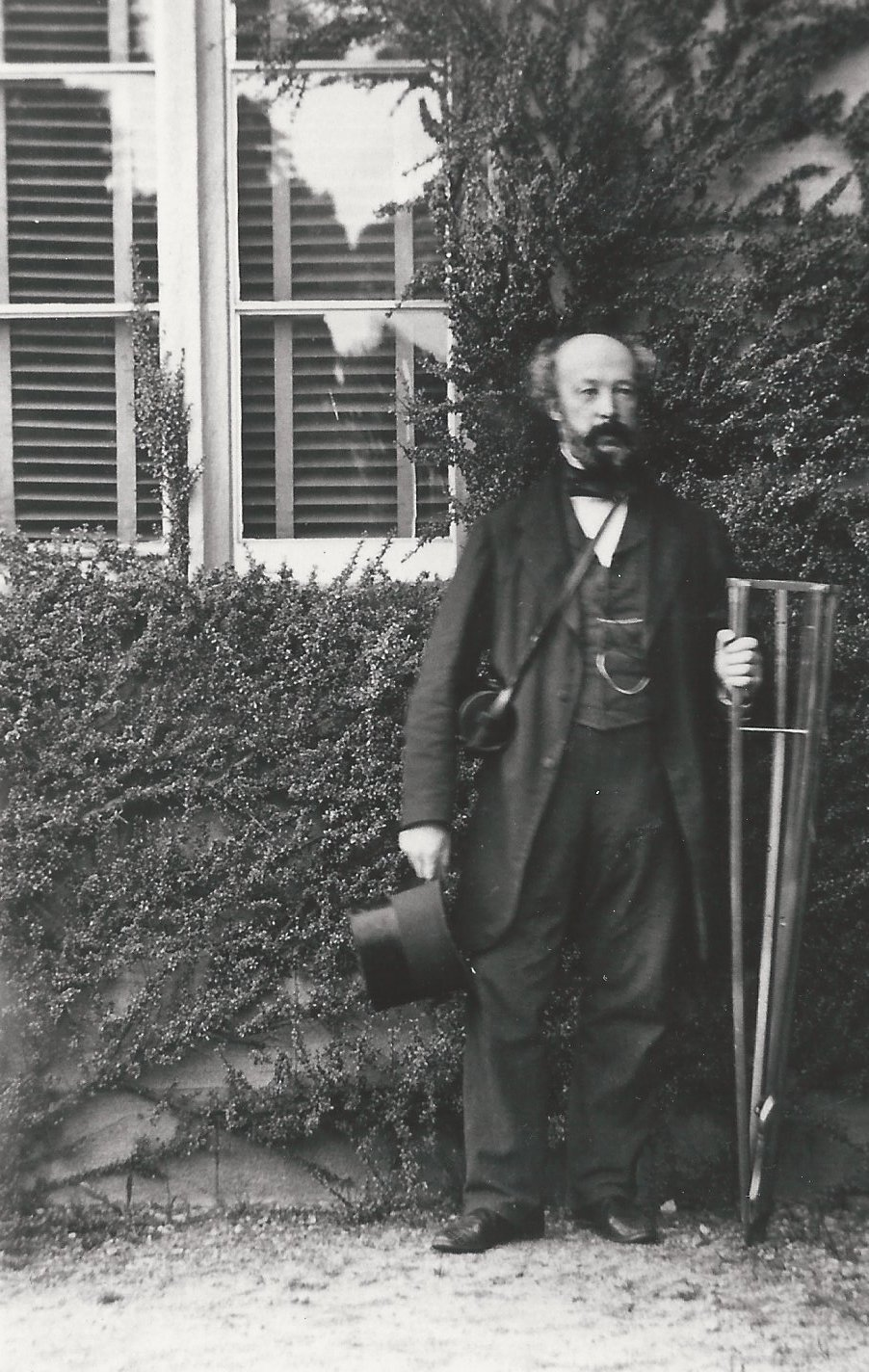
John Venimore Godwin was an early photographer

John Venimore Godwin was an early photographer and Mayor of Bradford in 1865-1866.

== Life ==
Godwin was born on 23 December 1814 in Dartmouth. He was the son of the Reverend Benjamin Godwin and his wife, Elizabeth. His father was the Baptist minister in Dartmouth, but he shortly moved to Great Missenden.

Godwin married Rachel and they had ten children. They lived in the 1847 rebuilt Micklefield House in Rawdon before moving to Crowtrees House. Godwin also owned the nearby Crow Trees Inn. He died at his home in Crowtrees on 20 January 1898 aged 83.

== Legacy ==
John asked his father in 1832 when they were living in Oxford to write about his life. Over the next 18 years his father wrote over fifty letters which he gave to his son on his son's birthday 23 December 1855. These letters provided him and historians with an insight into the Baptists and the abolitionists.

Business people in Yorkshire were concerned by the competition created by the French woollen industry. In 1876 the Chambers of Commerce nominated Godwin and Henry Illingworth to investigate the French. Illingworth took the lead and he went on to chair Bradford Chamber of Commerce.

Godwin was elected Mayor of Bradford in 1865 taking over from Charles Semon.

== Legacy ==
The A6181 (Godwin Street) in Bradford is named after John Venimore Godwin. Godwin's son John A. Godwin was the first Lord Mayor of Bradford in 1907.
