= Leonard Daniels =

English painter (1909-1998)

- Born: 28 November 1909; London, UK
- Died: 24 February 1998 (aged 88); Winchester, UK
- Education: Regent Street Polytechnic; Royal College of Art
- Known for: Painting

Leonard Daniels (28 November 1909 – 24 February 1998) was a British artist, teacher and administrator.

== Biography ==
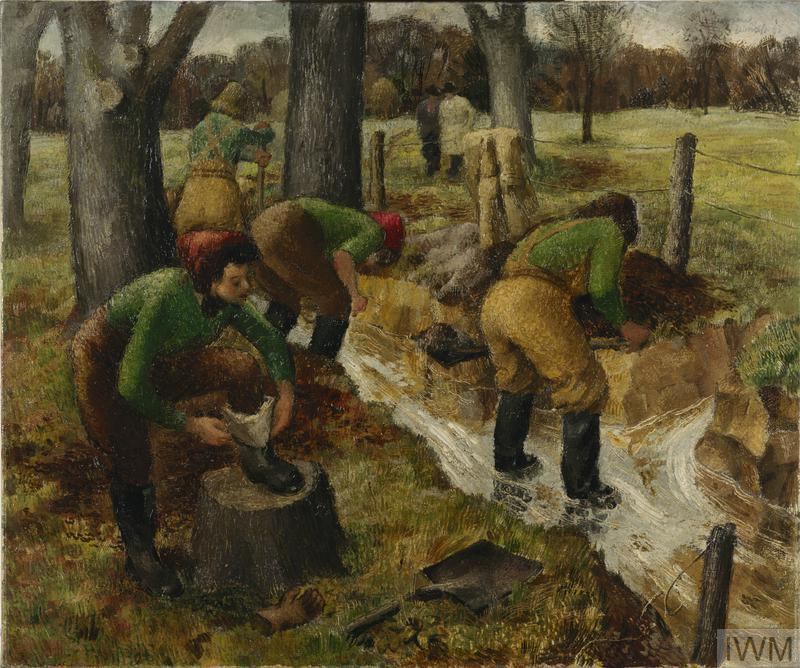
Women's Land Army Ditching (1943) (Art.IWM ART LD 2979)

Daniels was born in London and was educated at Holloway School and studied art at the Regent Street Polytechnic and attended the Royal College of Art, RCA, between 1929 and 1932. Daniels won a prize for his portrait painting in 1932 and when he graduated from the RCA he taught at the Clayesmore School in Dorset. In 1936 he moved to Taunton's School in Southampton. During World War Two, Daniels taught at the Southampton School of Art. After the school received a direct hit during a day-time air raid, which killed many staff and students, it was evacuated to Winchester. Daniels was instrumental in organising the move. Daniels was a keen sportsman, but in April 1942 a fencing accident meant he temporarily lost the use of his left arm and leg and he spent over a month in hospital. The accident also meant he was deemed unfit for military service and in 1943 he was appointed Head of the Printing School at the Leeds College of Art. During the war, Daniels spent time observing the work of the Women's Land Army and submitted several watercolours of their activities to the War Artists' Advisory Committee, who purchased a number of them.

In 1948, Daniels was appointed principal of the Camberwell School of Arts and Crafts. At Camberwell he recruited Gilbert Spencer, who had previously taught Daniels at the RCA. Daniels became Camberwell's longest serving principal and was responsible for recruiting several leading artists to teach, part-time, at the college. These included Edward Ardizzone, Claude Rogers, Victor Passmore, William Coldstream and Richard Eurich. Daniels, supported by a Leverhulme bursary, spent time at the British School of Rome in 1957. Daniels was active in the National Society of Art Education and in 1965 he was elected President of the Society. Daniels retired from Camberwell in 1975, but continued to paint and, on occasion, teach part-time. Daniels died in 1998, shortly before a retrospective exhibition of his work opened at Winchester Cathedral.
