= Wilhelm Norbert Pollack =

Wilhelm Norbert Pollack (1868–1916) was born in Straichingen in what is now Baden-Württemberg, Germany before moving with his family to Bradford, England, where there was a substantial German community working in the local textile industry.

An Anglo-German textile merchant who became Chairman of Bradford City Football Club, Pollack was Chairman through the club's most successful period which included the winning of the FA Cup in 1911 and also helped the club stay solvent through the early years of the First World War.

Pollack married the sister of Antonio Fattorini of the jewellery and trophy making company in 1896, he also became the Italian Consular Agent for Bradford and a Conservative councillor for the Heaton ward.
