= Richard Eurich =

English painter

Richard Ernst Eurich OBE RA
- Born: Richard Ernst Eurich; 14 March 1903; Bradford, Yorkshire, England
- Died: 6 June 1992 (aged 89); Southampton, Hampshire, England
- Education: Bradford School for Arts and Crafts; Slade School of Fine Art
- Known for: Painter

Richard Ernst Eurich, OBE, RA (14 March 1903 – 6 June 1992) was an English painter who worked as a war artist to the Admiralty in the Second World War and was also known for his panoramic seascapes and narrative paintings. These were often invested with a sense of mystery and wonder which have tended to set him apart from mainstream development of art in the twentieth century.

== Biography ==
=== Early life ===
Richard Eurich was born in Bradford. He was the second of five children born to Dr Friederich Wilhelm Eurich, a professor of forensic medicine and a bacteriologist known for his research into the disease anthrax. Richard was sent to St George's School, Harpenden at the age of ten and then attended Bradford Grammar School from 1918 till 1921. He then studied at Bradford School for Arts and Crafts in 1922 and continued his training at the Slade School of Art under Professor Henry Tonks until 1926.

Whilst still a student, Eurich met Sir Edward Marsh a great patron of the arts. He took Eurich under his wing and together with Eric Gill was instrumental in arranging Eurich's first one-man show at the Goupil Gallery in 1929. This exhibition consisted entirely of painstaking pencil drawings. At the opening, Eurich met the artist Christopher Wood who advised him to "paint what you love and damn all fashions that come and go" which advice Eurich took to heart. Marsh also introduced Eurich's work to the Redfern Gallery, run by Rex Nan Kivell. Eurich had a show there in 1933 which was so successful that the Redfern offered him a contract to act as his London dealer. His association with the gallery lasted for twenty-five years and he had a further fifteen exhibitions there. Eurich spent the early part of the 1930s living in small fishing ports on the south coast of England and in 1934 he settled in Hythe, Hampshire. Hythe, and the nearby Southampton Water, became regular subjects of his paintings.

=== World War Two ===
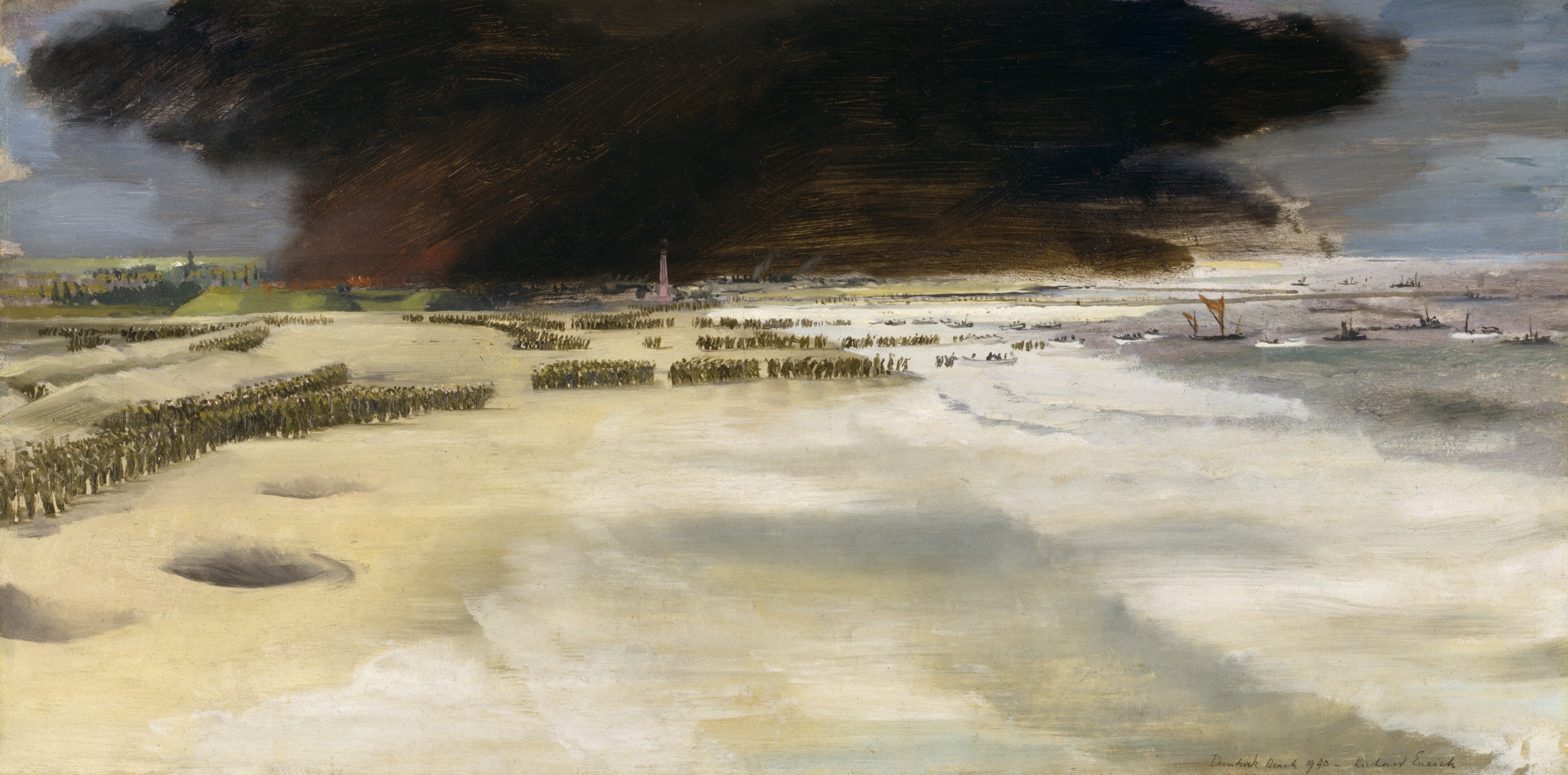
Dunkirk Beaches, 1940 (Art.IWMART LD 2277)

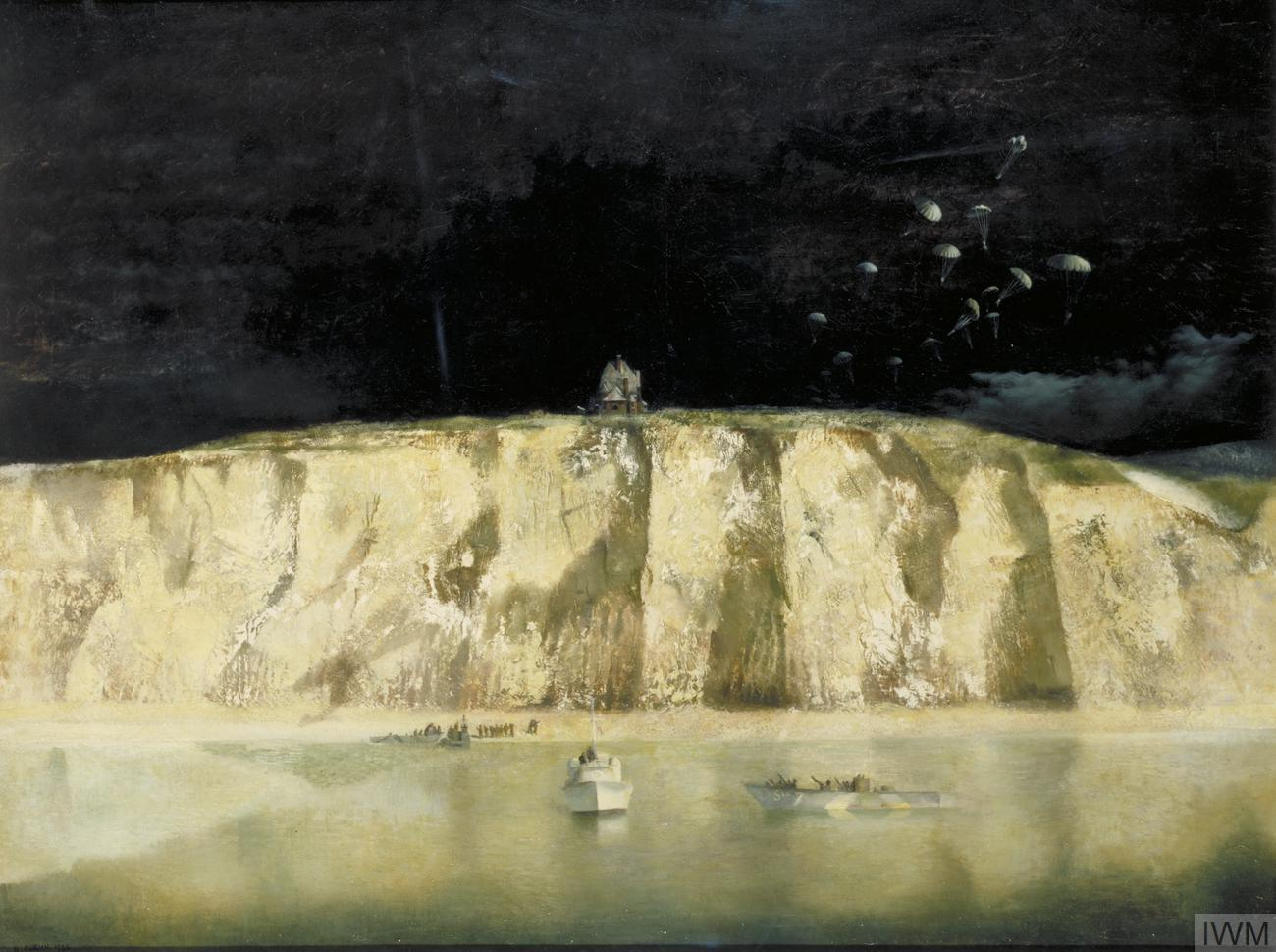
The Raid on the Bruneval Radio-location Station, 1942

In June 1940 Eurich wrote to the War Artists' Advisory Committee, WAAC, suggesting the withdrawal from Dunkirk as a subject, as he had previously painted in the port at Dunkirk. Although WAAC had already commissioned a large painting from Charles Cundall on the withdrawal, they agreed to Eurich's suggestion. His panoramic painting of the Dunkirk beaches made his name overnight when it was shown at the National Gallery in August 1940, alongside Cundall's treatment of the same subject.

After completing his Dunkirk painting and a number of other short-term commissions for WAAC, Eurich was given a full-time commission to paint Admiralty subjects. This commission lasted from 1941 to 1945 during which time he painted, sometimes, epic reconstructions of battle scenes, depictions of survival stories and also simpler paintings of ships and boats. Some of these works were based on locations and vessels Eurich was familiar with, such as his paintings of British fishing boats and of naval actions off the south coast of England. To ensure accuracy, Eurich made several trips on destroyers patrolling the Straits of Dover during the war. Other paintings were based on photographs and eyewitness accounts and some were wholly works of imagination. This last category included Survivors From a Torpedoed Ship showing exhausted men clinging to the upturned hull of their lifeboat. Although the painting was greatly praised, by Winston Churchill among others, WAAC quickly withdrew it from public display fearing it would adversely affect recruitment to the Merchant Navy. Eurich painted reconstructions of British Commando raids on Vaagso, Bruneval and Dieppe. For the Dieppe raid, Eurich was given access to the operations room for the attack and listened to the British radio communications as events developed. During the war, Eurich also painted scenes representing the D-Day landings, the Battle of Salerno, the wreck of the Tirpitz and air attacks on a convoy. In total during the war, Eurich completed some 34 oil paintings and one drawing for WAAC.

Eurich first had a picture exhibited at the Royal Academy in 1937. In 1942 he was elected an Associate member and became a full Academician in 1953. Eurich became a member of the New English Art Club in 1943 and was an honorary member of the Royal Society of Marine Artists.

=== Commissions and teaching ===
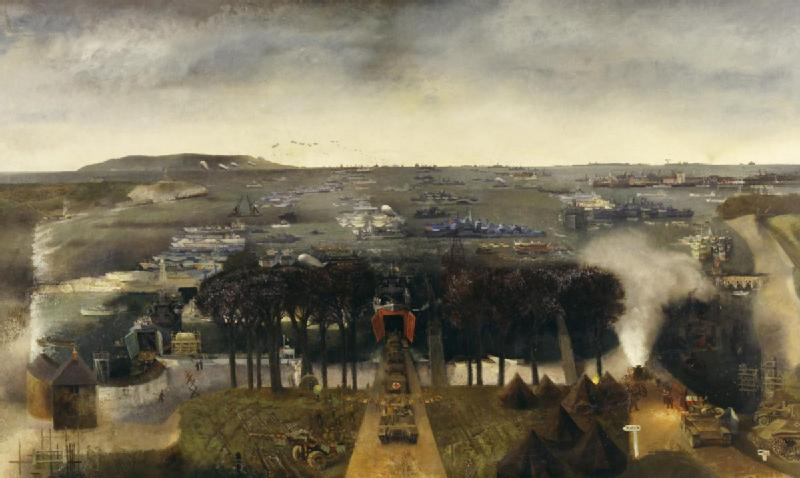
Preparations for D-day

Following the War, when it was difficult to make a living as a painter, Eurich accepted a range of commissions. Amongst these was one from Evelyn Waugh to depict the interior of a Dakota aircraft about to crash (called The Pleasures of Travel, 1951), which he painted in 1953. Also in 1953 he painted the Queen's Coronation for an illustrated newspaper. Then in 1956 came the Rededication of Rouen Cathedral.

From 1958 to 1965 he did a series for the Shell Shilling Guides of various counties. The Esso Oil Refinery at Fawley in Hampshire was close to where he lived and in 1960 he painted a picture of "The Seven Sisters", the name given to a group of pressurised spheres.

In 1968 he painted the large diptych depicting Whitby Harbour and Chatsworth House for the Teaching Hospital in Sheffield. Unfortunately this is not on show at present as the building was redesigned and there is no space for them. This is the only work he ever did in acrylic as it was deemed less reflective than oil paint.

From 1949 till 1968 Richard taught part-time at Camberwell School of Art under Leonard Daniels. From 1969 until 1971 he taught part-time at the Royal Academy Schools.

=== Later life ===
In 1958 Eurich wrote an as yet unpublished autobiographical fragment called "As the Twig is Bent" which records his early life until the end of his student days.

After World War Two, the Redfern only exhibited abstract art so Eurich started a five-year association with Arthur Tooth and Sons, but from 1973 he began to exhibit at the Fine Art Society who championed his work for the rest of his life.

In 1951 and 1980 there were retrospective exhibitions organised by the Bradford Art Galleries. The second of these toured to Southampton, London and Glasgow. In 1981 he won the first Hunting Art Prize for oil painting with his picture "Weymouth Bay 1980". In 1981 he was given an OBE and in 1989 an Hon D Litt from Bradford University. In 1991 the Imperial War Museum, assisted by the Fine Art Society, put on a retrospective exhibition which, although he was ill, Eurich managed to attend.

== Family and friends ==
In 1934 Eurich married Mavis Pope, a teacher at Southlands Training College in Wimbledon and the daughter of a Methodist minister. The couple set up home in the New Forest where Mavis' parents were and they had four children. Crispin, the eldest (b. 1935) became a successful photographer but he died of a brain tumour in 1976 at the age of 40. Joanna died in infancy in 1945. Caroline (b. 1942) and Philippa (b. 1947) survive.

Eurich was a shy man but formed several lasting friendships. John Bickerdike, the sculptor, introduced him to African sculpture when he was a student in London, and Eurich and Bickerdike remained good friends in later life. Eurich was greatly influenced by Sidney Schiff, who wrote under the name Stephen Hudson, and many of his letters to him are in the Tate Archive. He had a long correspondence with the artist Edward Wadsworth. Later on, Bernard Dunstan, who also taught at Camberwell, and his wife Diana Armfield were among the few with whom Eurich kept in regular touch.
