= Harry McEvoy =

British industrialist and food manufacturer (1902–1984)

Harry McEvoy (16 August 1902 – 3 November 1984) was a British industrialist and food manufacturer. He was born in Bradford, West Yorkshire and educated at Bradford Grammar School before heading to America to study for a business degree at Columbia University. At the end of his studies he became a salesman for a small cereal company in Battle Creek, Michigan run by Will Keith Kellogg. Such was his success that he was promoted and given the task of returning to his native England in order to put the Kellogg Company well and truly on the map there. By 1938 he had established a large factory in Stretford, Greater Manchester, which is still a major force in cereal production today.
