= American Friends =

- Directed by: Tristram Powell
- Written by: Michael Palin; Tristram Powell
- Produced by: Steve Abbott; Patrick Cassavetti
- Starring: Michael Palin; Connie Booth; Trini Alvarado
- Cinematography: Philip Bonham-Carter
- Edited by: George Akers
- Music by: Georges Delerue
- Production companies: Prominent Features; British Screen Productions; BBC
- Distributed by: Palace Pictures
- Release dates: 22 March 1991 (UK); 21 November 1991 (Australia); April 1993 (US)
- Running time: 95 minutes
- Country: United Kingdom
- Language: English
- Budget: £2.5 million
- Box office: $23,034 (US) £141,096 (UK)

American Friends is a 1991 British film starring Michael Palin. Co-written by Palin and director Tristram Powell, the plot is based on a real-life incident involving Palin's great-grandfather, Edward Palin.

== Plot ==
Palin plays Francis Ashby, a senior Oxford professor on holiday in the Swiss Alps in 1861. There he meets the American Caroline Hartley (Connie Booth) and her 18-year-old ward Elinor (Trini Alvarado). Ashby is drawn to them both, particularly Elinor, but is rather surprised when they arrive in Oxford and rent a house. Women are not allowed in the college, nor are fellows allowed to marry, which puts him in an embarrassing situation. Ashby's rival for the post of college president, Oliver Syme (Alfred Molina), takes full advantage of this to try to discredit Ashby.

== Cast ==
- Michael Palin as Rev. Francis Ashby
- Trini Alvarado as Elinor Hartley
- Connie Booth as Caroline Hartley
- Alfred Molina as Oliver Syme
- Bryan Pringle as Haskell
- Fred Pearson as Hapgood
- Susan Denaker as Mrs. Cantrell
- Jonathan Firth as Cable
- Ian Dunn as Gowers
- Robert Eddison as William Granger Rushden
- David Calder as Pollitt
- Simon Jones as Anderson
- Charles McKeown as Maynard
- Roger Lloyd-Pack as Dr. Butler
- John Nettleton as Rev. Groves
- Alun Armstrong as Dr. Victor Weeks
- Sheila Reid as Mrs. Weeks
- Edward Rawle-Hicks as John Weeks
- Markus Gehrig as Swiss Guide
- Jo Stone-Fewings as Undergraduate
- Jimmy Jewel as Ashby Senior
- Wensley Pithey as Cave
- Arthur Howard as Voe
- Charles Simon as Canon Harper
- Adrian Gannon as Extra

== Awards ==
The film won the Writers' Guild of Great Britain Award for Best Screenplay, recognizing co-writers Michael Palin and Tristram Powell.

== Music ==
Composed by Georges Delerue, the film's music score was recorded with a full symphony orchestra. It was one of Delerue's final soundtracks, recorded approximately eighteen months before his death.

The music remained unreleased for over two decades until it was issued on CD by Music Box Records in 2013, with a digital version following in 2026.
