= Jack Toll =

English footballer

Personal information
- Full name: John Patrick Toll
- Date of birth: 7 December 1914
- Place of birth: Bradford, England
- Date of death: 1972 (aged 57–58)
- Height: 5 ft 10 in (1.78 m)
- Position: Inside forward

Senior career*
Years	Team	Apps	(Gls)
- Bridlington Town
1936–1938	Burnley	20	(9)
Total		20	(9)
- * Club domestic league appearances and goals

John Patrick Toll (7 December 1914 – 1972) was an English professional footballer who played as an inside forward.
