= Jacob Smillie =

British athlete (born 1998)

Personal information
- Full name: Jacob Smillie
- Born: 16 September 1998 (age 27) Bradford, West Yorkshire, England
- Height: 5 ft 8 in (173 cm)
- Weight: 14 st 2 lb (90 kg)

Playing information

Rugby league
- Position: Wing
Club
Years	Team	Pld	T	G	FG	P
2019–20	Halifax	1	0	0	0	0
2020–21	Swinton Lions
	Total	1	0	0	0	0

Rugby union
Representative
Years	Team	Pld	T	G	FG	P
2019	Jamaica	1	0	0	0
- Source: As of 25 January 2021

Jacob Smillie (born 16 September 1998) is a British-born Multi Sport Professional Athlete, starting his Playing career as a duel code rugby union & rugby league player, before transitioning to American football.

== Playing career ==
=== Rugby Union ===
Smillie was born in Bradford, West Yorkshire and played rugby union for Doncaster Knights Academy side in 2018 and 2019.

In March 2019 on the basis of his appearances for the Knights Academy side he was selected to play for the Jamaican national team in the 2019 Rugby Americas North Championship against Bermuda. Coming on as a substitute Smillie could not help as the Crocs lost 43–14 to Bermuda.

=== Rugby League ===
Smillie began his Rugby journey at the age of 18 where he joined Leeds City college Rugby League team, and also played rugby league at amateur level for Bradford-based Wibsey Warriors. In 2019 he signed as a professional for Halifax. After a number of appearances for the reserves, including scoring a length-of-the-pitch try against Keighley Cougars reserves which caught the attention of former rugby league winger Martin Offiah, Smillie made his first team debut in the 1895 Cup second-round game against Sheffield Eagles.

At the end of the season with Halifax, Smillie joined home town club Bradford Bulls for 2020. He made hit first senior team appearance in a Pre season friendly against Hunslet R.L.F.C., and also featured in numerous reserve games.

With the 2020 rugby league season at all levels badly affected by the COVID-19 pandemic, the season was cut short, but in July 2020 he was signed by Swinton Lions ahead of the 2021 Championship season.

In 2021 Smillie decided to leave professional rugby as he was invited to pursue a career in the NFL, through the NFL International Combine.

=== American Football ===
In October 2021 Smillie was invited along with 52 other athletes from around the world to take part in the NFL's International Combine at Tottenham stadium, trying out for a spot on the NFL's International Player Pathway Program as a running back. He was one of the 12 selected from the UK, and the only member from West Yorkshire to be selected. He got the 4th fastest time overall in the 40 Yard dash.

Despite not being selected to the International Player Pathway Program and not allocated to one of the 32 NFL teams, Smillie was invited to the 2022 Canadian Football League Global Combine. This made him eligible for the 2022 CFL global draft.

After spending time with European League of Football Franchise Stuttgart Surge at their Mini Camps, Smillie signed his first professional American Football contract as he decided to sign with Silesia Rebels for the 2022 season, who play in the Polish Football League. He played as a running back.

In 2024 Smillie joined German team Braunschweig New Yorker Lions in the German Football League.
