= Charles Semon =

Charles Joseph Semon (1812–1877) was born in Danzig in 1812 of German Jewish descent. He came to Bradford, England, in the middle of the 19th century and soon built up one of the most important textile export houses in the town. His expertise was not only running a successful textile export business but also as a leading light in Bradford's municipal affairs, charities and education.

Mayor Charles Semon, 1864

== Chamber of Commerce ==
Semon was an active member of the Bradford Chamber of Commerce from its foundation and was Vice President in 1871. It was on his initiative that the Chamber of Commerce made representations to the Government of the day for the conclusion of a commercial treaty with Romania which brought great benefit to the textile industry of the town and to Romania.

== Mayor ==
Semon was the first foreign as well as the first Jewish Mayor of Bradford, elected in 1864, he served until John Venimore Godwin took over the following year. Semon also served with distinction on the municipal council for a number of years. He was made Justice of the Peace and Deputy Lieutenant of the West Riding of Yorkshire.

== Philanthropy ==
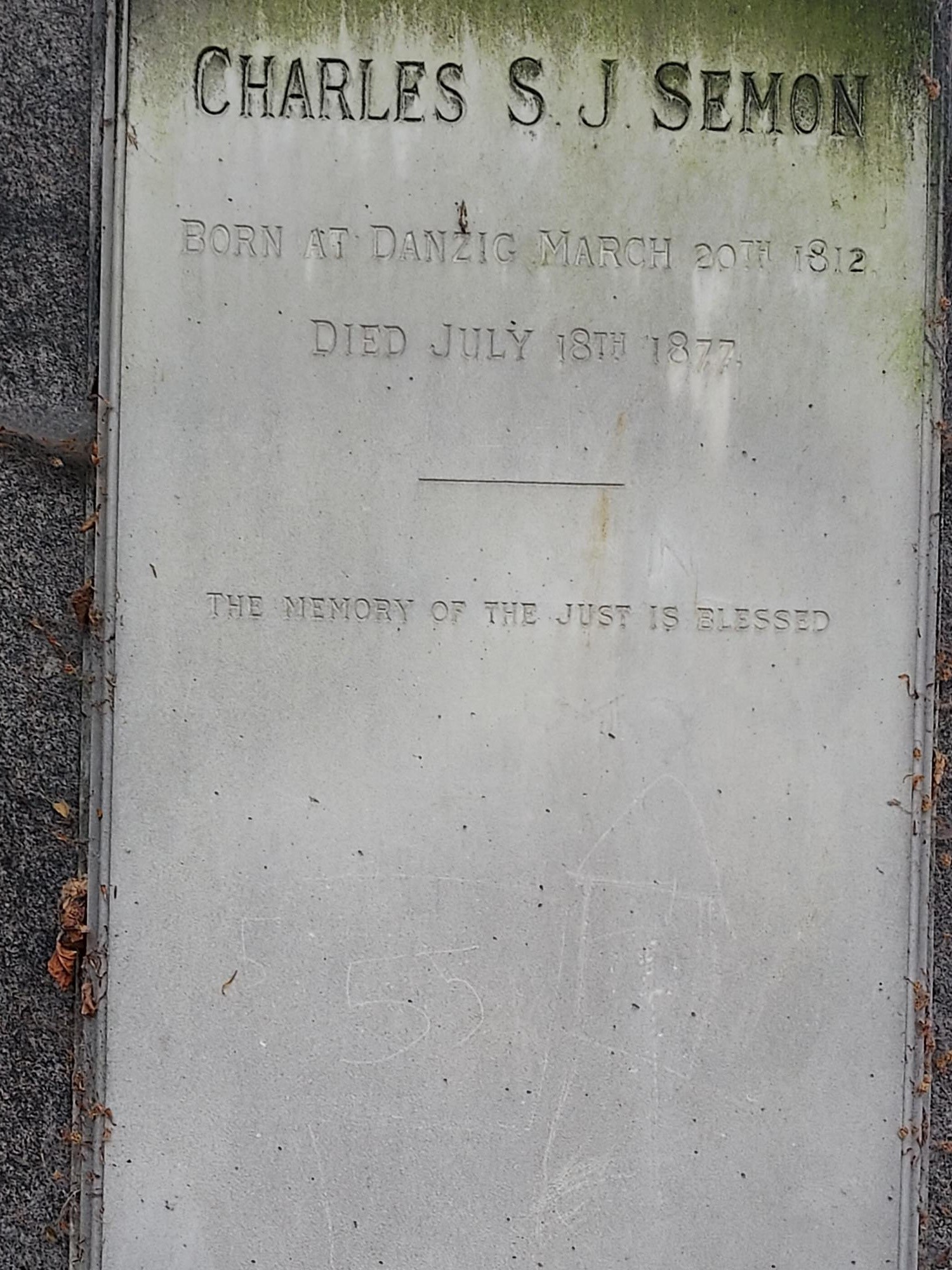

Charles Semon, a major philanthropist, paid for and built a convalescent home in Ilkley on the Yorkshire Moors in 1874. He handed it over to Bradford Corporation in 1876 with an endowment for its upkeep. Charles Joseph Semon died in Switzerland in 1877. He was buried in Bradford. In his will he bequeathed £35,000 for the benefit of educational institutions in Bradford.
