= Friederich Wilhelm Eurich =

German bacteriologist

- Born: 1867; Chemnitz, Saxony
- Died: 1945

Dr. Friederich Eurich (1867–1945) was a German bacteriologist.

== Early life and education ==
He was born in Chemnitz, Saxony of German Jewish descent, he came to England at the age of seven. His father moved to the branch of a German yarn firm in Little Germany, Bradford, where there was a substantial German community. Friederich was educated at Bradford Grammar School and trained at Edinburgh, graduating MD in 1897. He set up a general practice in Bradford in 1896 and held a Saturday morning surgery, free of charge, at Bradford Royal Infirmary.

== Career ==
Cutaneous anthrax (wool sorter's disease) had become a serious problem in the woollen mills of Bradford, the use of alpaca and mohair from Central Asia was the source of the disease. To counter the problem, Bradford Council established a Pathological and Bacteriological Laboratory and Eurich was appointed bacteriologist.

The laboratory was originally located in the Technical College but in 1905 the Bradford Anthrax Investigation Board relocated the laboratory to Morley Street, where Eurich became the bacteriologist to the board. With Eurich's expertise in the field of bacteriology, and putting his own health at great risk while investigating the disease, the Board instituted other medical measures against anthrax and, in 1918, built a Wool Disinfecting Station in Liverpool.

The investigative nature of his work as a bacteriologist encouraged him to apply for the post of Professor of Forensic Medicine at Leeds Medical School in 1908. The year’s work involved 40 lectures, all in the autumn term, and acting as internal examiner twice a year. For this he received an honorarium of £38 p.a. until he retired from the post in 1932. He was a popular teacher, achieved outstanding results, which he put down to the intrinsic allure of the subject - the glamour of the detective story.

== Death and recognition ==
On Friederich Eurich's death in February 1945, the Yorkshire Observer recorded that he "did so much to conquer the disease of anthrax and his contributions in the cause of medicine were so outstanding."
