= Jacob Moser =

Jacob Moser (28 November 1839 – 1922) was a businessman, philanthropist and, later, councillor, who made his home in Bradford and became a leading participant in the civic life of the city.

Lord Mayor Jacob Moser, 1910

== Life ==
Moser was of German Jewish descent and was born at Kappeln, Duchy of Schleswig, which was then part of Denmark. As a young man he spent some years in Hamburg and in Paris, and came to Bradford in 1863. During his first nine years there, he worked for firms such as W. Herels, Jonas Simonson and Co., and Hirsch, Pinner and Co. In 1872 he became a partner, and eventually the main figure, in the firm of Edelstein, Moser and Co., which developed into one of the great Bradford textile export houses.

Moser retired from the woollen trade in 1902 and then alongside his wife Florence devoted the next 20 years to supporting civic life in Bradford and education and health causes in particular in the UK and abroad.

Jacob Moser was a philanthropist, and it is estimated that throughout his life he gave £750,000 to various causes and charities. Alongside his work in his textile export business, Jacob was a founder of the Bradford Charity Organisation Society and the City Guild of Help. He was involved in founding Bradford Technical School in 1882. He served on the board of the Infirmary from 1883 and gave £5000 to a fund to build a new hospital. In 1898 he provided £10,000 as a benevolent fund for the old and infirm of the city. He supported the local Children's Hospital and gave 12,000 books to Bradford Central Library.

He joined Bradford Council as an independent member for Manningham in 1896. He served Heaton from 1901 to 1904, and in 1909 was elected unopposed in the Little Horton ward. In 1910 Jacob Moser was Lord Mayor of Bradford and Chief Magistrate. Moser was a founder of the Bradford Reform Synagogue. He was also an advocate of the formation of the Jewish State of Israel.

The following tribute was paid by a Bradford newspaper to the memory of Jacob Moser, "He was a foreigner, but he made himself one of ourselves, he was of the Jewish persuasion, but his heart was big beyond all religion in the common cause of humanity".

Moser also financially supported the establishment and development of the Herzl Hebrew High School (Gymnasium) in Tel Aviv and Bezalel School of Art and Crafts in Jerusalem, and provided financial assistance to the Hebrew Gymnasium in Jerusalem. These educational institutions continue to play a significant role in contemporary Israeli education and culture. In 1907 he gave 80,000 Marks to the Herzl Hebrew Gymnasium and 10,000 Marks, to be paid in annual instalments of 1,000 Marks, to the Bezalel School of Arts and Crafts in Jerusalem.

Moser also made a significant financial contribution to the expansion of a hospital and, together with his brother Emil, the installation of a modern water supply (waterworks) in his hometown of Kappeln which was completed in 1910. He donated 10,000 Marks to the hospital and alongside Emil 67,000 Marks for the waterworks which covered more than half of the investment cost.

There are two streets named after Moser in Bradford and one in Tel Aviv: Moser Avenue and Moser Crescent are on the Swain House Estate in North Bradford, which was constructed during the inter war years; while Ya’akov Mozer St. (Jacob Moser St.) is situated off the David Yellin St. in the centre of Tel Aviv, very close to the present location of the Herzl Hebrew Gymnasium.
