= Fattorini & Sons =

British jeweller

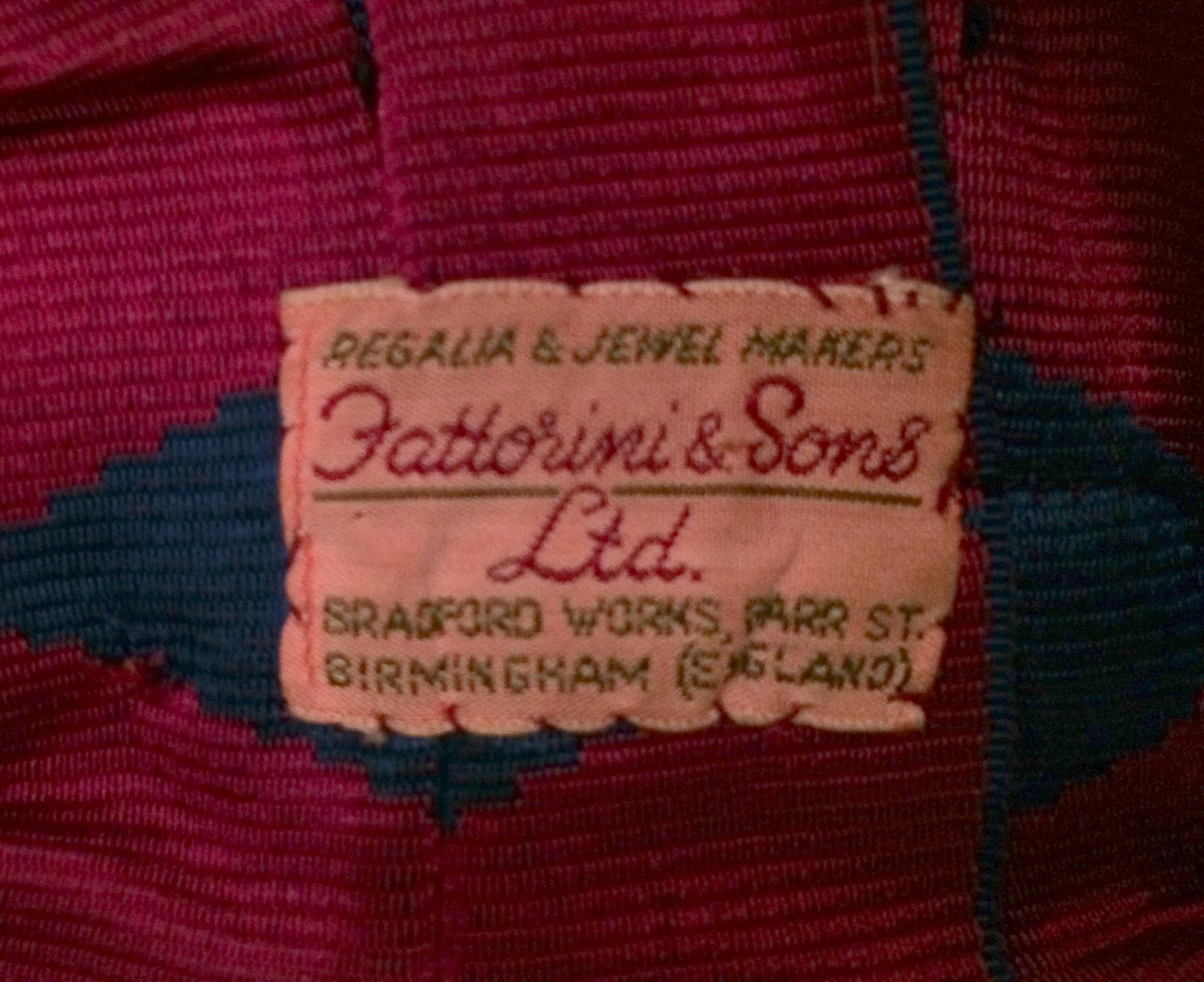
Fattorini & Sons manufacturer's label on a Masonic Royal Arch sash.

Fattorini & Sons Ltd was a jewellery business established by a family of Italian immigrants who arrived in the British city of Leeds, in Yorkshire, England in the early 19th century. Antonio Fattorini opened a shop in Harrogate to take advantage of seasonal trade in Harrogate in 1831, this business is today owned and run by descendants of the founders. In the 1850s, he opened a shop in Bradford with two of his sons. In 1883, the firm made the first ever chess clock comprising two linked pendulum clocks.

== Trophy work ==
By the 1920s, the company was making sports trophies and medals for the local and then national markets. They made such famous trophies as the FA Cup and the Rugby League Challenge Cup - both in use to this day. Fattorini and Sons also marketed sewing machines manufactured by Varley. Thomas Fattorini Ltd, emblematic jewellers, still manufacture specialist bespoke sports trophies, awards and medals today.

== Masonic regalia ==
For many years Fattorini and Sons were a prominent manufacturer of regalia for use in the different Orders of Freemasonry. Their factories and retail outlets in Yorkshire and Birmingham provided a regional competitor to the well-known London based regalia manufacturing companies. Many items of masonic regalia manufactured by Fattorini and Sons remain in current use, and bear the company's "signature-style" label.

The North Wales Society of Architects' Presidential Chain of Office was designed in 1954 by Fattorini and Sons of hallmarked sterling silver finished in polished hard gold plate and vitreous enamelled in three colours.

== Manningham Rugby Club and Bradford City Football Club ==
The family became heavily involved with Manningham Rugby Club in Bradford. Indeed, Tony Fattorini represented Manningham when the club became part of the breakaway from Rugby Union in 1895 which resulted in the birth of what we know today as the Rugby league. Manningham were the new game's first champions in 1896. After a period of decline Manningham changed games and became the football club Bradford City in 1903. Once again the Fattorinis were at the forefront of the switch to football, they also designed and made the FA cup which Bradford City won in 1911.

== Today ==
Fattorini & Sons was sold to Thomas Fattorini Ltd in 1984. Thomas Fattorini Ltd and Fattorini & Sons were friendly rivals for many years, both businesses being owned and managed by descendants of Antonio Fattorini. Thomas Fattorini Ltd is still trading, and is located in the Birmingham Jewellery quarter, where it is managed by the 6th generation of the Fattorini family. The Harrogate jewellery shop is owned and run by the Tindalls, descendants via the female line.
