= Jacob Behrens =

Anglo–German textile merchant

Sir Jacob Behrens
- Born: Jacob Behrens; 20 November 1806; Bad Pyrmont, Germany
- Died: 22 April 1889 (aged 82); Torquay, England
- Known for: Textile merchant Educator; Philanthropist

Sir Jacob Behrens (20 November 1806 – 22 April 1889) was an Anglo–German textile merchant. His company, Sir Jacob Behrens & Son Ltd., was established in 1834 and still operates today. Behrens was Jewish and was a prominent member of the Anglo-Jewish Association.

== Biography ==
=== Early life ===
Born in Bad Pyrmont, Germany, into a family of merchants, Sir Jacob Behrens settled in Leeds in 1834, establishing his business there. He then moved to Bradford in 1838, opening a factory in Thornton Road.

=== The businessman ===
Behrens helped to establish the Bradford chamber of commerce. Behrens was knighted by Queen Victoria in 1882 for his work in strengthening trade relations between Britain and France.

=== The educator ===
Behrens helped to reorganise Bradford Grammar School in 1871, and he helped establish the Great Horton Road Technical College in 1882.

=== The philanthropist ===
Behrens was a prominent member of the Bradford Philosophical Society, and founded the Eye and Ear Hospital in Bradford.
