= Bradford Synagogue =

Synagogue in Bradford, West Yorkshire, England

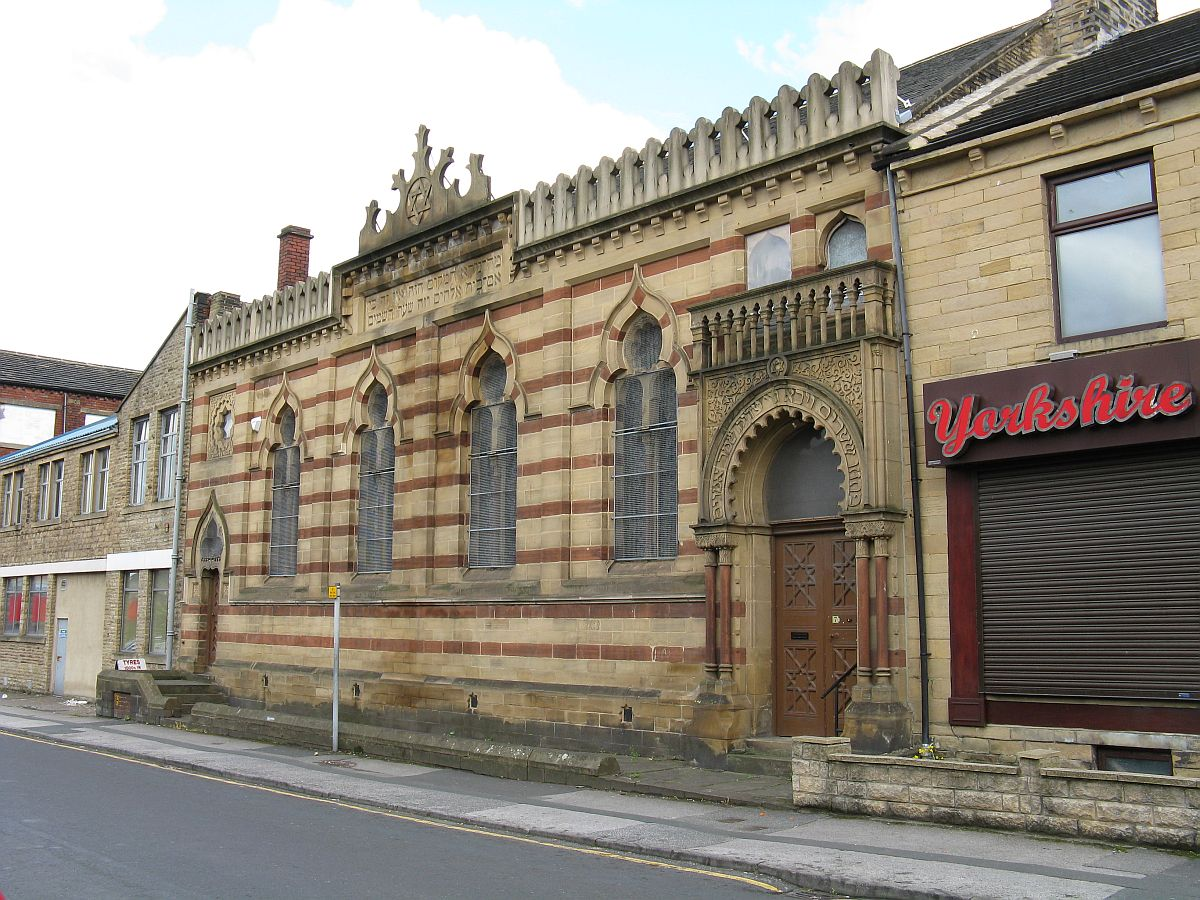
- The synagogue in 1990

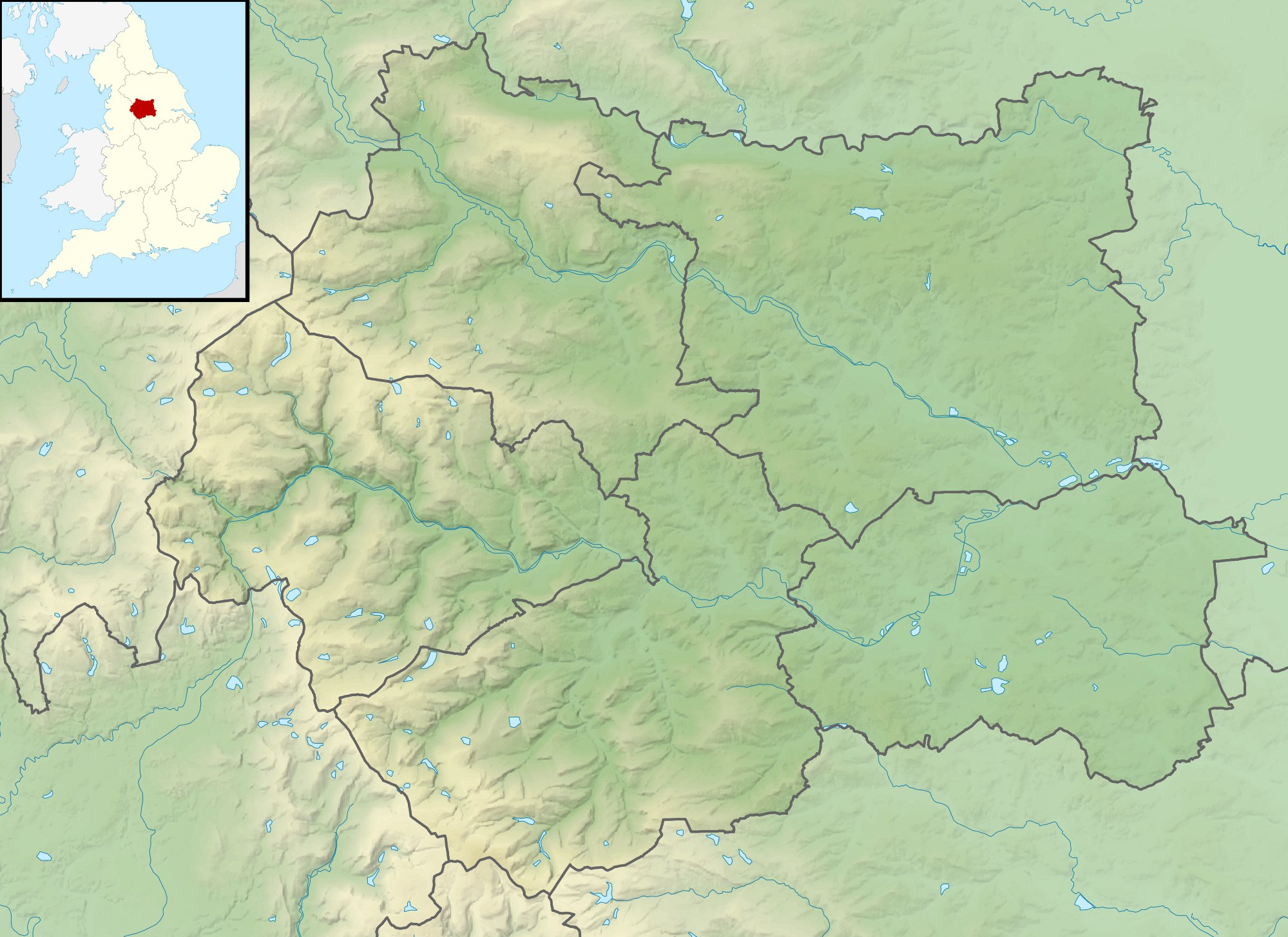
- Location of the synagogue in West Yorkshire

Religion
- Affiliation: Reform Judaism
- Ecclesiastical or organizational status: Synagogue
- Status: Active

Location
- Location: 7a Bowland Street, Bradford, West Yorkshire, England BD1 3BW
- Country: United Kingdom
- Interactive map of Bradford Synagogue
- Coordinates: 53°48′04″N 1°45′45″W

Architecture
- Architects: Francis and Thomas Healey
- Type: Synagogue architecture
- Style: Moorish Revival
- Established: 1873 (as a congregation)
- Completed: 1881
- Materials: Ashlar stone; slate

Website
- bradfordsynagogue.co.uk

Listed Building – Grade II*
- Official name: Bradford Synagogue (Reform)
- Type: Listed building
- Designated: 6 December 1989
- Reference no.: 1227613

The Bradford Synagogue, officially Bradford Reform Synagogue, is a Reform Jewish congregation and synagogue, located at 7 Bowland Street in Bradford, West Yorkshire, England, in the United Kingdom. Established as a congregation in 1873, the synagogue building was completed in 1881. The synagogue building was listed as a Grade II* building in 1989.

The congregation is affiliated with the Movement for Reform Judaism. The congregation was founded as the Jewish Association, and then changed its name to the Bradford Congregation of British & Foreign Jews until the 1950s. Since 2018, it has also been called the Bradford Tree of Life Synagogue. The congregation uses the synagogue for Shabbat and major festivals although the community is small and has been in decline for some years. Friday night dinners are held as well as a communal seder for Passover.

== History ==
German-born Jews played an important role in the development of the local woollen trade and Jewish merchants from central Europe took advantage of the climate of economic and political freedom in Bradford.

The Bradford Synagogue is the third Reform synagogue established in the United Kingdom, and is the second oldest surviving Reform synagogue in the United Kingdom. Its establishment predated the building of an Orthodox synagogue in the town. The foundation stone was laid in 1880 and the community was founded by one of the first Reform rabbis in Britain, Rabbi Dr Joseph Strauss. Construction was completed in 1881.

Aged 28 and with a Rabbinic diploma, Strauss was appointed as the first rabbi in Bradford in 1873, and was welcomed by the community at a general meeting on 31 October of that year. Rabbi Strauss led the community from 1873 to 1922.

The decline of the local Jewish community meant that the synagogue faced financial difficulties and a meeting was held in June 2009 where the community agreed to the sale of its building as “a very last resort”. Subsequent to this meeting funding was secured that enabled the community to continue using the current building. This was supported by the local Muslim community.

== Architecture ==
The synagogue building was listed as a Grade II* building in 1989. Architecturally, Bradford is a very rare and well-preserved, small-scale, provincial synagogue built in "Oriental" style. It is perhaps the most notable example in British synagogue architecture of the 19th-century fashion for "Orientalism" – both inside and out.

== Notable members ==
- Jacob Moser (1839–1922), congregation founder, philanthropist, and mayor of Bradford

== See also ==
- History of the Jews in England
- List of Jewish communities in the United Kingdom
- List of synagogues in the United Kingdom
