= Bradford Grammar School =

Independent school in Bradford, West Yorkshire, England

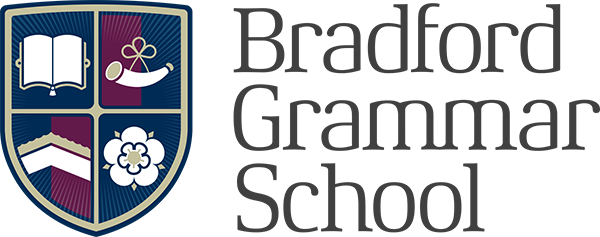

Location
- A650 Keighley Road; Bradford, West Yorkshire, BD9 4JP; England
- 53.81455°N 1.76981°W

Information
- Type: Private day school Grammar school
- Motto: Latin: hoc age (Do this)
- Established: 1548; 478 years ago
- Headmaster: Simon Hinchliffe
- Gender: Co-educational
- Age: 4 to 18
- Enrolment: 1122
- Colours: Navy & Burgundy
- Co-education since: 1999
- Website: bradfordgrammar.com

Bradford Grammar School (BGS) is a co-educational private day school located in Frizinghall, Bradford, West Yorkshire, England. Entrance is by examination. Sixth form admission is based on GCSE results. The school gives means-tested bursaries to help with fees. Like many other independent schools, BGS also offers a small number of scholarships based on academic achievement.

== History ==
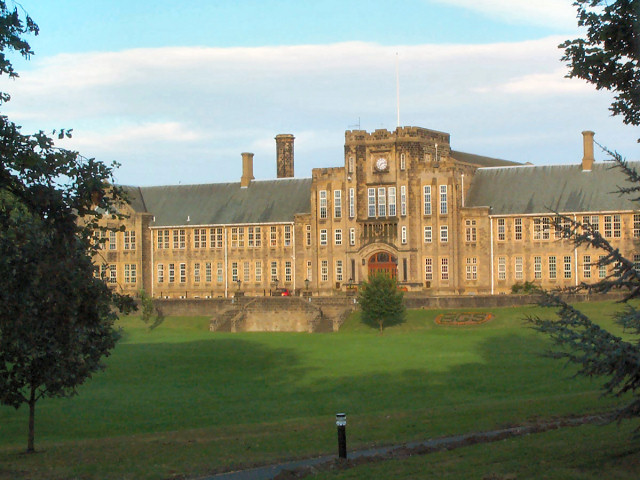
Bradford Grammar School

The school was founded in 1548 and granted its Charter by King Charles II in 1662. The Reverend William Hulton Keeling became the headmaster in 1871. He had transformed the grammar school in Northampton, and here he did the same, joining forces with the merchant Jacob Behrens, Bradford Observer editor William Byles and Vincent William Ryan Vicar of Bradford. The school was considered as good as the best public schools in 1895 and Keeling died in 1916 having been given the Freedom of the City. His daughter Dorothy Keeling ran The Bradford Guild of Help and transformed voluntary work in the UK.

Until 1975, the school was a direct grant grammar school, and when this scheme was abolished, it chose to become independent. The school motto is Latin: Hoc Age ('Do This').

=== Second World War ===
The new school building in Frizinghall was actually completed in 1939; however, the start of the Second World War prevented the building from being opened as a school. During the war, the main school building was used as a Primary Training Centre, and there is still evidence of this around the building. During this time, many BGS pupils were evacuated to Settle, and returned when the building was released from army occupation and completed. Inside the school, there is a large memorial to the former pupils who died in the war.

=== Frizinghall railway station ===
Frizinghall railway station closed in 1965 and remained closed for 22 years. During this time, staff and pupils at the school campaigned to get the station reopened. In the end, it was due to the efforts of an English teacher, Robin Sisson, that the station was reopened as a halt.

== Education ==
31 courses are offered for A-Levels, and 97% of sixth-form pupils went on to study further education or deferred a year.

== Sport ==
The school has a rowing club, which is affiliated to British Rowing, with a boat code of BRG.

== Alumni ==
- John Sharp (1645–1714), Archbishop of York
- Abraham Sharp (1653–1742), mathematician and scientific instrument maker
- David Hartley (1705–1757), philosopher and physician
- John William Whittaker (1790–1854), clergyman
- Louis Addin Kershaw (1845–1899), Chief justice
- Frederick Delius (1862–1934), composer
- Ernest Leopold Sichel (1862–1941), artist
- Sir Charles Harris (1864–1943), civil servant
- Henry de Beltgens Gibbins (1865–1907), economic historian
- John Coates (1865–1941), singer
- William Binnie (1867–1949), civil engineer
- Sir Frank Watson Dyson (1868–1939), Astronomer Royal
- Charles Wilson(1869–1959), physicist
- John Lawrence Hammond (1872–1949), historian and journalist
- Sir William Rothenstein (1872–1945), artist
- Henry Ernest Stapleton (1878–1962), chemist, numismatist
- Herbert William Parke (1903–1986), classicist and librarian
- Christopher Lintrup Paus
- Albert Rutherston (1881–1953), painter and illustrator
- Humbert Wolfe (1885–1930), poet and civil servant
- Charles Fairburn (1887–1945), railway engineer
- Eric Craven Gregory (1887–1959), benefactor of the arts
- John Rawlings Rees (1890–1969), psychiatrist
- Sir Mortimer Wheeler (1890–1976), archaeologist and broadcaster
- Herman Shaw (1892–1950), geophysicist and Director of the Science Museum in London
- Arthur Raistrick (1896–1991), civil engineer, industrial archaeologist and pacifist
- Harry McEvoy (1902–1984), breakfast cereal manufacturer
- Richard Eurich (1903–1992), painter
- H. L. A. Hart (1907–1992), legal philosopher
- Geoffrey Barraclough (1908–1984), historian
- William Henry Walsh (1913–1986), philosopher
- Kenneth Garside (1913–1983), Academic Librarian and Military Intelligence Officer
- Michael Wharton (1913–2006), columnist Peter Simple
- Alan Bullock (1914–2004), a.k.a. Baron Bullock of Leafield, historian
- Denis Healey, Baron Healey (1917–2015), Chancellor of the Exchequer
- Ken Morrison (1931–2017), Executive Chairman of Morrisons
- Alan Smithson (1936–2010), bishop of Jarrow
- David Hockney (1937-2026), artist
- Duncan Kirkbride Nichol, chief executive of NHS, 1985 -1993
- David Miliband (born 1965), former Secretary of State for Foreign and Commonwealth Affairs
- Malcolm Laycock (1938–2009), radio presenter and producer
- Vivian Nutton (born 1943), classicist and medical historian
- Paul Slack (born 1943), historian
- Michael Jack (born 1946), politician
- Jonathan Silver (1949–1997), entrepreneur and art gallery owner
- Colin Lawson (born 1949) clarinetist, academic and Director of the Royal College of Music
- Nick Toczek (born 1950), writer and performer
- Victoria Braithwaite (1967–2019), animal behaviour scientist
- Boris Rankov (born 1954), Professor of Roman History at Royal Holloway, University of London; 6-time Boat Race winner with Oxford
- John Bainbridge Webster (born 1955), Chair of Systematic Theology at King's College, University of Aberdeen
- Alastair Campbell (born 1957), journalist, former Downing Street Press Secretary (1997–2000) and the first Downing Street Director of Communications (2000–2005)
- David Wootton (born 1958), Lord Mayor of London
- Roger Mosey (born 1958), Master of Selwyn College, Cambridge
- John Mann, (born 1960), Member of Parliament for Bassetlaw
- Steven Wells (1960–2009) Ranting poet, punk journalist, novelist, comedy writer for On The Hour.
- Ashley Metcalfe (born 1963), former Yorkshire County Cricket Club cricketer
- Andrew Jones (born 1963), Member of Parliament for Harrogate and Knaresborough
- Adrian Moorhouse (born 1964), Olympic gold medallist swimmer
- Richard Nerurkar, (born 1964), marathon and 10,000 metres runner
- Geraint Rees, (born 1967) scientist
- Enzo Cilenti, (born 1974) actor
- Robert Ashforth, (born 1976) professional rugby union player (Fly half)
- Jon Sen, (born 1974) TV producer, Executive Producer EastEnders
- Dan Scarbrough (born 1978), England rugby union player (Full back / Wing)
- Robert Hardy (born 1980), bassist of Franz Ferdinand
- Charlie Hodgson (born 1980), England rugby union player (Fly half)
- John Hollingworth (born 1981), English actor
- Benson Taylor (born 1983), film composer
- Uzair Mahomed (born 1987), cricketer
- Alistair Brownlee (born 1988) British triathlete; brother of Jonathan Brownlee
- Jonathan Brownlee (born 1990) British triathlete; brother of Alistair Brownlee.
- Yuan Yang (born 1990) Member of Parliament for Earley and Woodley
- Georgie Henley (born 1995), actress
- Will Luxton (born 2003), cricketer

== See also ==
- Listed buildings in Bradford (Manningham Ward)
