= Jos Vantyler =

Irish actor

- Vantyler at 2022, Bafta Awards
- Born: County Mayo, Ireland
- Occupation: Actor

Jos Vantyler is an Irish stage and screen actor known for his work in classical theatre, including productions at Shakespeare’s Globe and The Old Vic.

== Early life ==
Vantyler was born in County Mayo, Ireland, where he lived until the age of six.

== Career ==
It was announced by Deadline Hollywood on April 10th 2024 that Jos Vantyler and Niamh McCormack would both star in a new Action Series Drama ‘Cold Mind‘.

In 2025, Vantyler portrayed Feste in Twelfth Night or What You Will at Shakespeare’s Globe. His performance received critical acclaim, with reviewers praising his musicality, comic timing, and portrayal of the character’s underlying melancholy. Critics described his interpretation as perceptive and emotionally nuanced, and several reviews identified his Feste as a standout performance in the production.

In 2023 he starred in the film Brunswick Street, playing Jack Campbell.

Vantyler starred in The Fir Tree at Shakespeares Globe in 2022 directed by Michelle Terry the Globes Artistic Director. The production was well received. It was an adaptation for stage by Hannah Khalil of Hans Christian Andersen's fairy tale.

In 2021/2022 he played Philip in Peggy For You at Hampstead Theatre opposite Tamsin Greig directed by Richard Wilson. The play received critical acclaim, "I have to say this was one of the best nights I’ve ever spent in the theatre. In fact, it was one of the best nights of my life." wrote Lloyd Evans of The Spectator "Richard Wilson's artful, rewarding revival. Resonant and amusing" Dominic Maxwell The Times.

In 2022 he joined the regular cast of the sixth series Believe It alongside Richard Wilson, Ian McKellen and Stephen Mangan on BBC Radio 4.

He appeared with David Tennant in 2022 in BBC Radio 4's critically acclaimed Macbeth.

He played Anselmus in The Second Maiden's Tragedy at the newly refurbished Hackney Empire for which he received critical praise. He played King Philip V1 of France in The Lion in Winter for Fairbanks Theaters with Chicago director Don Morrelli.

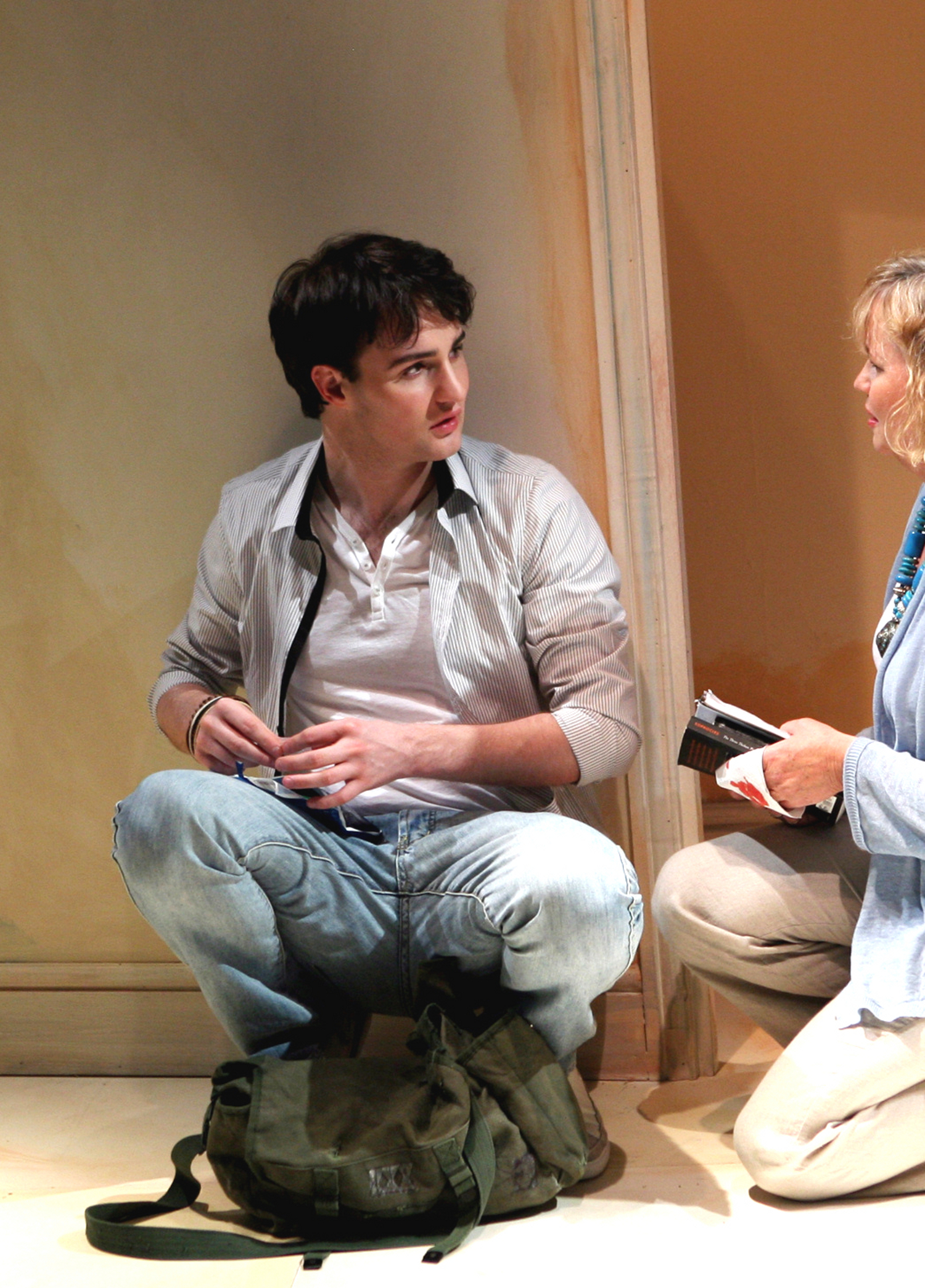
Vantyler in Prophecy

He appeared in the controversial play Prophecy by New York City playwright Karen Malpede. Although certain press branded the play as a disturbing piece, Vantyler's portrayal of a young soldier suffering from extreme PTSD received acclaim and resulted in Vantyler being nominated for a Critics Choice Award – Best Actor for his performance. The press described Vantyler as "a young exciting actor with distinctive looks and a powerful presence". In preparation for the role, Vantyler researched the condition at a military hospital in Scotland. It had transferred from New York to London and later back to Broadway. Vantyler did not resume his role in the new revised Broadway production.

He played the lead opposite Academy Award Nominee Susannah York in The Tennessee Williams Season for The Hampstead New End Theatre. Owing to sell-out audiences from its opening night and positive reviews from the press, the show transferred to another sellout run at the Hackney Empire. Vantyler and York went on to become close friends.

He played Tom Sawyer in the National Tour in James Graham's play Huck, a stage adaptation of the Mark Twain classic, Huckleberry Finn. He garnered critical praise and was named "The Mercurial Jos Vantyler" by Time Out and received the Offie for Best Male Performance.

Harold Brighouse wrote The Game in 1914, and it was performed that same year; it was not performed again until 2010 by Northern Broadsides. Directed by and starring Barrie Rutter. Vantyler played Rutter's son, Leo Whitworth. Both he and the production received critical praise.

== Shakespeare ==
In 2018 he was the first actor ever to play the roles of both Don Armado and his page Moth at the same time in Shakespeare's Globe's production of Love's Labour's Lost at the Sam Wanamaker Playhouse under the direction of Nick Bagnall. Bagnall's idea of having him play both characters resulted in Vantyler playing most of his scenes, by himself and to himself. The Independent wrote "Much less conventionally, Vantyler plays both himself and, switching from hissing Hispanic to yapping Northern, his own diminutive page ("my tender juvenile"), Moth. The resulting schizoid conversations and the solicitous care for Moth’s person are a blissfully crackpot fancy" and "Jos Vantyler is inspired as Don Armado, hilariously capturing the mangled verbal extravagance of this Spanish grandee". That same year he played Gerald in Two Noble Kinsmen also at Shakespeare's Globe, directed by Barrie Rutter. This rarely performed piece was part of Michelle Terry's first season as artistic director.

In September 2013, Sir Jonathan Miller directed the Gala Performance of William Shakespeare's King Lear at The Old Vic in London. Vantyler played Oswald opposite, Joss Ackland as King Lear, Michael York, Tony Robinson, Greta Scacchi, Honeysuckle Weeks, John Nettles, Robert Young, Tony Britton, Shaun Dooley, Barrie Rutter and Felicity Dean.

Sir Jonathan Miller's 2015 "revelatory" 5 star production of King Lear again saw Vantyler in the role of Oswald for Miller, this time opposite Barrie Rutter as Lear. Vantyler was highly praised for his comedy in the role of Oswald. Standard Magazine wrote "Jos Vantyler shimmered and glowered as a camp, dastardly Oswald and his death scene was truly gripping... you could tell he was a Miller choice". Others went on to add "Jos Vantyler gives a scene stealer of a performance as Oswald, up front but perfectly controlled, making a real person of someone who could easily be just a cypher". WhatsOnStage wrote "Jos Vantyler turns Oswald into a classy comic turn"

"There were many outstanding performances including Jos Vantyler who played the comedic role of Abraham Slender and had the audience in fits of laughter with almost every speech he made" and "Poor Slender, for example, beautifully played by Jos Vantyler, captures our hearts" describe his performance as Slender in The Merry Wives of Windsor in Northern Broadsides' anniversary production of the play.

== New Writing ==
Emmy Award winning writer Ron Hutchinson's play, Dead On Her Feet is set in the American Great Depression. The action takes place during a Dance Marathon contest. Vantyler stars as Mel Carney the Dance Marathon promoter, the protagonist of the piece, directed by Barry Kyle, Honorary Associate Director of the Royal Shakespeare Company. Critics praised Vantyler as a "tour-de-force", Howard Loxton of The British Theatre Guide noted that Vantyler gave a "stunning performance" continuing with "The promoter may be an exploitive conman but the actor is charismatically watchable. He gives the man a capacity to charm as well as making him ruthless, yet his face is a mask, and it is not painted on". Bella Todd of Time Out offered that "Jos Vantyler's sensuous-lipped, sinister-eyed Master of Ceremonies ... conjures romance, rivalry and crises from thin air". Vantyler received the 2012 Offie for Best Male Performance and the Theatre Choice Awards for Outstanding Performance In a New Play.

In 2015, Vantyler played the intelligence officer and Foreign Office official Guy Burgess in the television series The Secret Files.

Working again to great success on the world premier of Flying Into Daylight for Belfast writer Ron Hutchinson and Live Theatre Artistic Director, Max Roberts with writer, Hutchinson, making his directorial debut. The play was a two hander and told the story of Virginia (Summer Strallen) and her journey of self-discovery through finding herself obsessed with the Tango. Jos played tango teacher Marco as well as every other male role in the play. The press said of his performance "Best Actor goes to Jos Vantyler for his versatile performance in Flying into Daylight." He received The Journal Culture Award for Best Actor.

In 2016, in the Film Short, Tango Down, by Emmy Award winning writer Ron Hutchinson, Vanyler played the lead Tim. The downtrodden finance who turns to murder to save his upcoming wedding.

Political playwright Shaun McCarthy wrote Circus Britannica, "captivating and unusual, new play creates a disturbing world". The play explored immigration and xenophobia set within the British Circus. Vantyler played Stevie, the young protagonist if the piece. The character Stevie was a trapeze artist, and so Vantyler had special coaching and choreography on trapeze from Britain's oldest professional woman aerialist Helen McCall. Whats On Stage said of Vantyler "Jos was born to play that role" and gives "an outstanding performance".

== Musical Theatre ==
Chitty Chitty Bang Bang (musical) written by Richard and Robert Sherman with book by Jeremy Sams was revived by director James Brining and multi Olivier Award winning choreographer Stephen Mear in 2016, Vantyler took over the role of The Childcatcher He is one of the youngest actors to ever play the part. The Bristol Post wrote "the scariest villain of all time is The Child Catcher (Jos Vantyler), and he was no less frightening on the stage than he was on the big screen, so be prepared for those fears to be reignited." "the show's limelight is overwhelmingly pilfered by Jos Vantyler's malevolent Childcatcher, performing a less snivelly but equally intimidating interpretation of Robert Helpmann's original villain. Preceded [sic] onto the stage by his own silhouette, Vantyler's scourge of childhood happiness induces boot quaking from adults and children alike, making his fellow villains seem mildly mediocre by comparison." Edinburgh Guide. "The Childcatcher has to be most people worst nightmares, everyone remembers that character as a child. To bring that to life on stage and be absolutely terrifying is a challenge, one that Jos Vantyler nails. He was the perfect Villain, the children around me (and possibly even myself...) were shivering in their seats whenever he came on. A performance I shall remember for a long time!"

During the 2018–19 season, Vantyler played the part of Ms Gulch/The Wicked Witch of the West in The Wizard of Oz at the Birmingham Repertory Theatre, directed by Liam Steel.
