= Iwakura Mission =

1871 to 1873 Japanese diplomatic voyage

Iwakura Mission (岩倉使節団)
- Leaders of the Iwakura Mission photographed in London in 1872. L-R: Kido Takayoshi, Yamaguchi Masuka, Iwakura Tomomi, Itō Hirobumi, Ōkubo Toshimichi
- Ambassador: Iwakura Tomomi

Under the Tokugawa Shogunate, Japan had previously dispatched a series of diplomatic mission to the United States in 1860 and Europe in 1862 and 1863. Building upon these earlier expeditions, the newly established Meiji government organized the Iwakura Mission or Iwakura Embassy (岩倉使節団, Iwakura Shisetsudan) to advance its modernization efforts. From 1871 to 1873, approximately 50 government officials traveled to the United States, the United Kingdom, France, Germany, and several other Western countries.

During this time, many Japanese officials expressed concerns regarding Japan's economic and political relations with Western powers, particularly the unequal treaties. The Meiji government organized the Iwakura Mission to study the political, military, economic, and educational institutions of the United States and Europe. The mission aimed to gather information that could contribute to Japan's modernization, support efforts to revise existing treaties, and strengthen its diplomatic standing internationally.

The aim of the mission was distinguish into three areas: to gain recognition for the imperial dynasty under the Emperor Meiji; to renegotiate the unequal treaties with the Western powers; and to make a study of modern industrial, political, military and educational systems and structures in the United States and Europe.

The Iwakura Mission was first advocated by Guido Verbeck, a Dutch-American missionary and advisor to the Meiji government who came to Japan in 1859. In 1869, Verbeck submitted a proposal titled Brief Sketch to the government official Okuma Shigenobu, recommending that Japan send a delegation to the United States and Europe to study Western political, economic, and educational institutions firsthand. His proposal outlined potential objectives and areas of study for the delegation. In 1871, Verbeck discussed the propose with Iwakura Tomomi, who subsequently led the mission. Verbeck remained involved in an advisory capacity during its planning.

== Participants ==
The Mission was named after its leader, Iwakura Tomomi, who served as ambassador extraordinary and plenipotentiary. He was accompanied by four vice-ambassadors: Ōkubo Toshimichi, Kido Takayoshi, Itō Hirobumi, and Yamaguchi Naoyoshi. Kume Kunitake served as the mission's secretary and official chronicler, documenting the delegation's travels and observations. His account was published in 1878 as a five-volume work titled Tokumei Zenken Taishi Bei-Ō Kairan Jikki (特命全権大使米欧回覧実記). The publication recorded the delegation's observations of political institutions, industrial development, education, and social conditions in the United States and Europe, providing information relevant to Japan's modernization efforts during the Meiji period.

==== Kido Takayoshi ====
Kido Takayoshi (1833-1877) was born in the Choshu Domain. He grew up studying swordsmanship and Western military science, and believed that removing the Tokugawa shogunate was necessary in modernizing of Japan. Before his involvement in the Iwakura Mission, he served as a samurai and a special police officer.

In 1871, he participated in the Iwakura Mission. This mission reinforced his belief that Japan was not yet prepared to compete with Western powers and needed to prioritize domestic modernization before evolving internationally. After returning, he left the mission to focus on Japan's internal developments rather than supporting its foreign expansion agenda.

==== Okubo Toshimichi ====
Okubo Toshimichi (1830-1878) was a samurai and Meiji politician. The majority of his work revolved around implementing shogunate political reforms and influencing a government that reflecting an authoritarian regime.

Okubo worked to revise the Unequal Treaties of 1858 and joined the Iwakura Mission where he worked with Otto von Bismarck, the chancellor of Germany, who advised Okubo to concentrate Japan's attention toward developing its military power.

==== Itō Hirobumi ====
Itō Hirobumi (1841-1909) was the student of Yoshida Shōin, an educator who inspired the Meiji Restoration. Itō was of a few of Yoshida's students who served as a vice-ambassador for the Iwakura Mission under Iwakura Tomomi. Itō's main contribution to the mission was his help in educational reforms.

=== Students of the Mission ===
Administrators and scholars which totaled 48 people and 53 students and attendants were also part of the mission and outward voyage to Yokohama. Several of the students were left behind to complete their education in the foreign countries, including five young women who stayed in the United States to study, including the then 6-year old Tsuda Umeko, who after returning to Japan in 1882, founded the Joshi Eigaku Juku (present day Tsuda University) in 1900, Nagai Shigeko, later Baroness Uryū Shigeko, as well as Sutematsu, later Princess Ōyama Sutematsu.

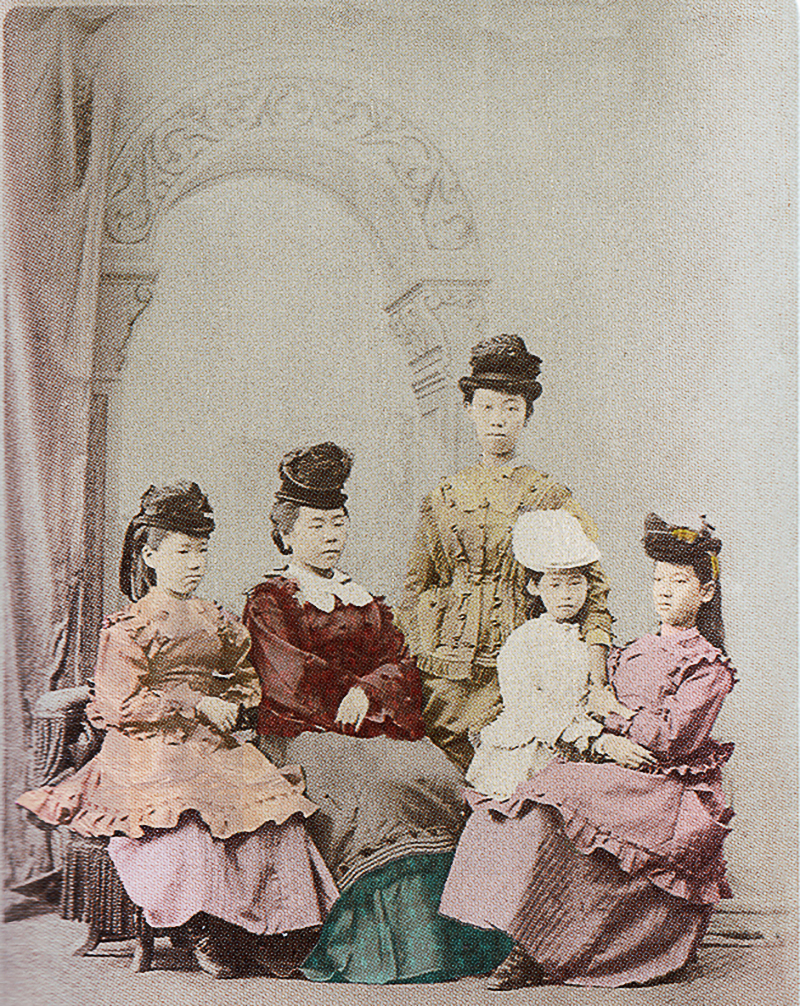
Students of the Iwakura Mission, from the left, Nagai Shigeko (10), Ueda Teiko (16), Yoshimasu Ryōko (16), Tsuda Ume (9) and Yamakawa Sutematsu (12)

- Kaneko Kentarō, a student, was left in the U.S. In 1890 he was introduced to Theodore Roosevelt in which they became friends and their relationship resulted later in Roosevelt's mediation at the end of the Russo-Japanese War and the Treaty of Portsmouth.
- Makino Nobuaki, also a student, was to remark in his memoirs: "Together with the abolition of the han system, dispatching the Iwakura Mission to America and Europe must be cited as the most important events that built the foundation of our state after the Restoration."
- Nakae Chōmin, who was a member of the mission staff and the Ministry of Justice, stayed in France to study the French legal system with the radical republican Emile Acollas. Later he became a journalist, thinker and translator and introduced French thinkers like Jean-Jacques Rousseau to Japan.

== Itinerary ==
=== United States ===
In December of 1871, the Iwakura Mission began its voyage from Yokohama to the United States, arriving on January of 1872 in San Francisco, California. An expedition of 100 Japanese leaders, government officials, and students set sail for the West, on the SS America (1869), bound for San Francisco. Upon arrival, the group travelled by train via Salt Lake City and Chicago, eventually reaching Washington, D.C., on 29 February. The mission was to investigate Western nations to understand their socio-economic, political, and economic developments. Japan, like many other nations, was on the precipice of change. Industrialization ushered in technological innovation. It was a period of modernity that Japan embraced. The mission lasted seven months, prolonged by struggles with President Ulysses S. Grant and Secretary of State Hamilton Fish regarding amending the treaties. Unsuccessful in their attempts to renegotiate the existing unequal treaties, the party eventually set sail for the United Kingdom in August 1872.

Members of the Iwakura Mission were keenly interested in observing schools and learning more about educational policy. Tours to schools, universities and industrial locations in Boston, New York and Washington, D.C., were made as a result.

=== United Kingdom ===
On 17 August 1872 the Iwakura Mission arrived at Liverpool on the Cunard steamer Olympus. Traveling to London via Manchester, the party spent much of late August and early September in and around the capital, inspecting political, academic and military institutions, visiting the British Museum, travelling on the newly constructed London Underground and attending musical concerts at the Royal Albert Hall. After visits to the Royal dockyards at Portsmouth and a day visit to Brighton, the mission split into smaller groups to visit, among other places, Blair Atholl in the Highlands of Scotland, Edinburgh, the Yorkshire Dales and the industrial centers of Manchester, Glasgow, Edinburgh, Newcastle upon Tyne and Bradford.

Iwakura Tomomi led the Manchester-Liverpool delegation. A visit that culminated on 7 October in a civic reception and banquet where toasts highlighted the leading role of the region in world manufacturing, technology and municipal administration. In Glasgow, as guests of Lord Blantyre, the delegation stayed at Erskine House and were given tours of shipbuilding and steel fabrication facilities on banks of the River Clyde.

In Newcastle upon Tyne the group arrived on 21 October, staying in the Royal Station Hotel where they met the industrialist Sir William Armstrong. It had been ten years since the Bakufu mission had visited the town, but as a direct result of the visit significant new export orders were obtained for ships and armaments from Tyneside factories.

The gentlemen were attired in ordinary morning costume and except for their complexion and the oriental cast of their features, they could scarcely be distinguished from their English companions.

— Newcastle Daily Chronicle, 23 October 1872

They visited the Elswick Engine and Ordnance Works with Captain Andrew Noble and George Rendell, inspected the hydraulic engines and the boring and turning departments and examined the construction of Armstrong and Gatling guns. They also visited the Gosforth Colliery, descending into the mine itself. Further visits were made to Bolckow and the Vaughan Iron Works in Middlesbrough and iron-ore mines in Cleveland. The Newcastle and Gateshead Chamber of Commerce arranged a river trip on the Tyne, taking in the High Level Bridge, the Tharsis Sulphur and Copper Company Hebburn and the Jarrow Chemical Works.

From Newcastle upon Tyne the group travelled to Yorkshire, visiting the open countryside and Bolton Abbey prior to inspecting textile manufacturing facilities at Salts Mill in Saltaire and Dean Clough Mill in Halifax. Accompanied by the British Envoy to Japan, Sir Harry Smith Parkes, the group toured not only manufacturing facilities but also villages, schools, almshouses, hospitals and parks, which had been provided by Sir Titus Salt and Sir John Crossley for their workers.

On 28 October 1872, members of the Iwakura Mission arrived in Sheffield, England for four days where they stayed at Banner Cross Hall, a historic house owned by George Wilson, a managing director of Charles Cammell and Company, an iron, railway, and manufacturing firm. During this mission, they visited factories and attended various workshops where they gathered information specifically about the institutions and cultural foundations that supported their industrial development.

A visit to Chatsworth House on 30 October was followed by visits to Burton-upon-Trent, Birmingham, Worcester, Stoke on Trent and Chester.

The delegation was presented at an official audience with Queen Victoria at Windsor Castle on 5 December 1872. Another audience with the Prince of Wales took place at Sandringham on 9 December. The party finally left for France on 16 December.

=== Continental Europe, and return voyage to Japan ===
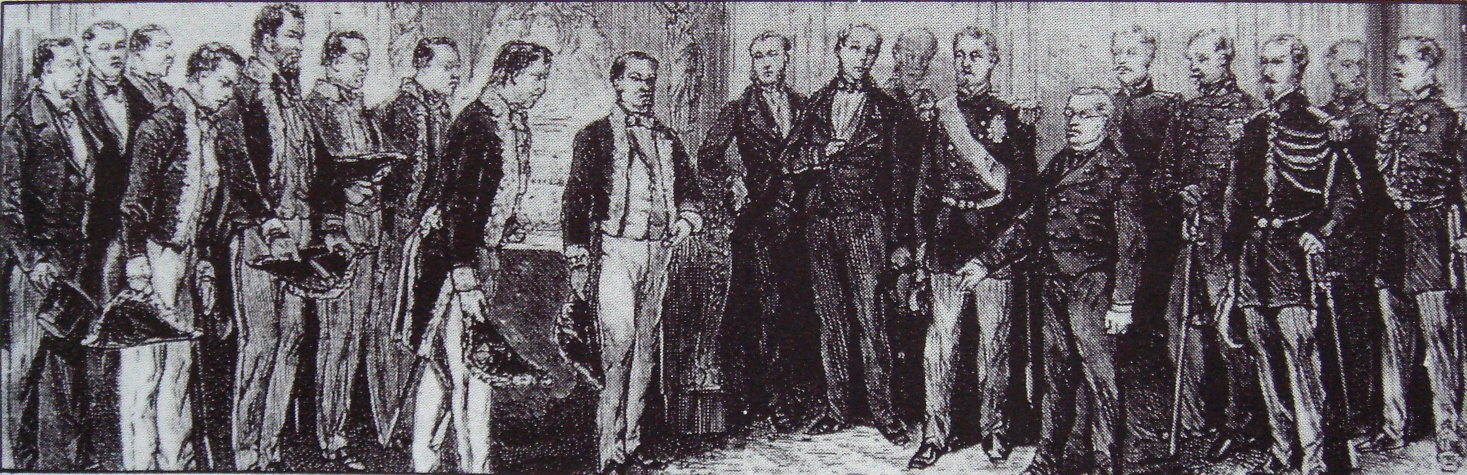
The Iwakura Mission visiting the French President Thiers on 26 December 1872.

France, Belgium, the Netherlands, Prussia, Denmark, Sweden, Austria, Italy, and Switzerland were all visited by the mission during the first half of 1873. On the return journey, Egypt, Aden, Ceylon, Singapore, Saigon, Hong Kong, and Shanghai were also stopping points en route, although visits in were short. The mission on September of 1873, almost two years after first setting out.

== Purpose and Results ==
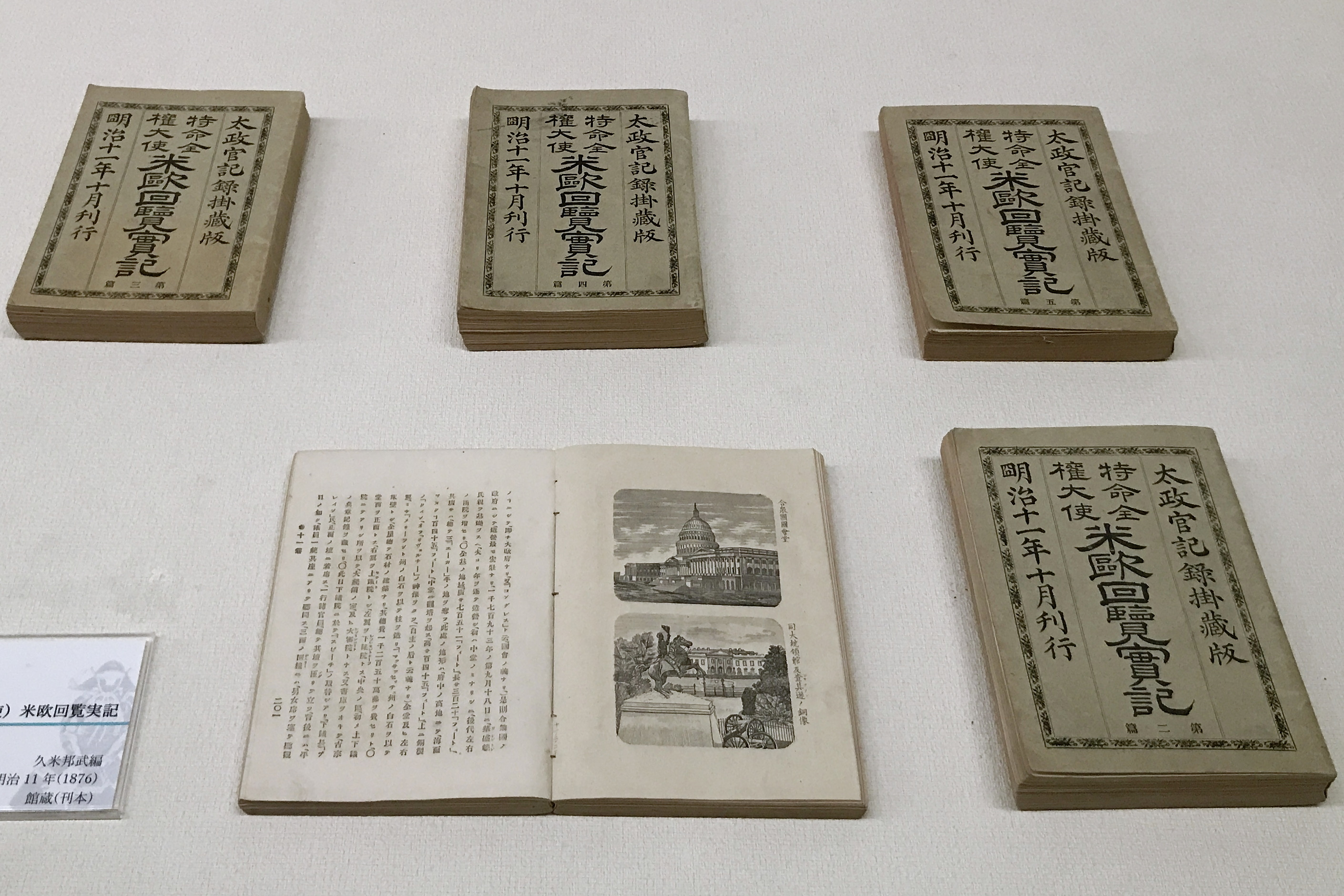
The book with the results of the mission in a museum

Of the initial goals of the mission the aim of revision of the unequal treaties was not achieved, prolonging the mission by almost four months, but also impressing the importance of the second goal on its members. The attempts to negotiate new treaties under better conditions with the foreign governments led to criticism of the mission that members were attempting to go beyond the mandate set by the Japanese government. Members of the mission were nonetheless favorably impressed by industrial modernization seen in America and Europe and the experience of the tour provided them a strong impetus to lead similar modernization initiatives on their return.

== Commemoration events ==
- In late 1990's a special celebration marked the 125th anniversary of the mission's visit to the north-west of England. Led by the Centre for Japanese Studies at the University of Manchester in collaboration with the Osaka Chamber of Commerce, a delegation of over 70 leading industrialists visited the Manchester Region. A Civic Banquet was held in Manchester Town Hall replicating the 1872 Reception. The Lord Mayor attended and received Ambassadors together with a citation from the Japanese Foreign Minister. A Civic Plaque commemorating the anniversary of the Iwakura Mission to Manchester was also inaugurated at the site of the original Manchester Town Hall.
- On 24 April 2023, Senior business leaders and political figures from the UK and Japan attended the Japan-UK Symposium, celebrating the 150 years of the Iwakura Mission at Japan House London in Kensington High Street, organised by the Institute of Directors’ Japan Business Group in partnership with the Embassy of Japan, the Department of International Trade, Japan Chamber of Commerce and Industries (JCCI), Japan External Trade Organisation (JETRO), Japan Society, Japan Exchange Group (JPX), Shimadzu UK Ltd and others. Speakers include The Rt Hon Nigel Huddleston MP, Minister of State for International Trade; The Rt Hon Greg Clark, MP Trade Envoy to Japan; The Rt Hon Anne-Marie Trevelyan MP, Minister of State in the Foreign, Commonwealth & Development Office; Hon. Rajesh Agrawal, Deputy Mayor of London for Business; and His Excellency Hajime Hayashi, Ambassador Extraordinary and Plenipotentiary of Japan to the UK.

== See also ==
- Bernardo the Japanese, the first Japanese to visit Europe, in 1553
- Tenshō embassy, first Japanese embassy to visit Europe, in 1582
- Hasekura Tsunenaga, a Japanese emissary who led the Keichō Embassy (慶長使節) to Europe between 1613 and 1620
- Grand Embassy of Peter I, an inspiration for the Iwakura Mission
- Japanese Embassy to the United States, in 1860
- First Japanese Embassy to Europe (1862)

== General references ==
- The official report of the Mission compiled by Kume was published in 1878, entitled Tokumei Zenken Taishi Bei-O Kairan Jikki (特命全権大使米歐回覧実記). It is available in English as: Healey, Graham and Tsuzuki Chushichi, eds, A True Account of the Ambassador Extraordinary & Plenipotentiary's Journey of Observation Through the United States of America and Europe, ISBN 4-901617-00-1.
- The Iwakura Mission in Britain, 1872 London School of Economics STICERD discussion paper IS/98/349 (March 1998)
- Nish, Ian. (1998) The Iwakura Mission to America and Europe: A New Assessment. Richmond, Surrey: Japan Library. ISBN 9781873410844; ISBN 0415471796; OCLC 40410662
- Jansen, Marius B. (2002). The Making of Modern Japan. Harvard University Press. ISBN 0-6740-0334-9.
- Japan and the North West of England: A Special Publication to mark the 125th anniversary of the Iwakura Mission, edited by Geoffrey Broad, published by the Greater Manchester Centre for Japanese Studies (September 1997) ISBN 1-900748-00-2.
