= Jonathan Silver =

English entrepreneur (1949–1997)

- Born: 21 October 1949; Bradford, England
- Died: 25 September 1997 (aged 47); Wetherby, England
- Occupation: Businessman
- Known for: Salts Mill restoration
- Spouse: Margaret Jackson (m. 1972)
- Children: 2

Jonathan Silver (21 October 1949 – 25 September 1997) was a British entrepreneur from Bradford, Yorkshire, England; he was responsible for the restoration of Salts Mill as a thriving cultural, retail, and commercial centre.

== Background ==
Silver was born in Bradford on 21 October 1949, to a family of German Jewish descent. He was a pupil at Bradford Grammar School where he at first did not shine academically but enjoyed working on the school's magazine. His interest in David Hockney's talent as an artist began to blossom and after they met at Silver's father's burger bar, Hockney agreed to design a cover for the school magazine. Silver then studied Art History and Textiles at Leeds University.

While a student Silver exhibited entrepreneurial skills and spent his school lunch breaks at the local auction rooms buying and selling furniture. By 1979 he owned 13 menswear shops across the country as well as a clothing factory, Noble Crest, and a shop called Art and Furniture in Manchester. In 1979 he sold his Jonathan Silver chain to the John Michael Group; he sold or closed most of his other businesses and began a partnership with his friend and supplier Sir Ernest Hall.

== Dean Clough ==
In 1983 Hall and Silver bought Dean Clough, a huge former carpet factory in Halifax, West Yorkshire; they began to regenerate it. They contributed equal shares, but the two men had very different business styles and Hall bought Silver out the next year. According to Hall, Silver's main contribution at Dean Clough was opening and running a very successful bar called Crossley's, but Silver felt that he had contributed much more than that. Although they did not continue to work together, Hall and Silver remained close friends.

Prior to buying Dean Clough, Hall and Silver bought C&J Hursts in Huddersfield, England.

== Salts Mill ==
After leaving Dean Clough and his sale proceeds, Silver travelled the world with his wife, Maggie, and their two young daughters. Upon returning to England, Silver, looking for a new challenge, bought Salts Mill in 1987. The mill was in a dilapidated state however Silver could see the building's potential, and transformed it into retail and commercial units as well as an art gallery.

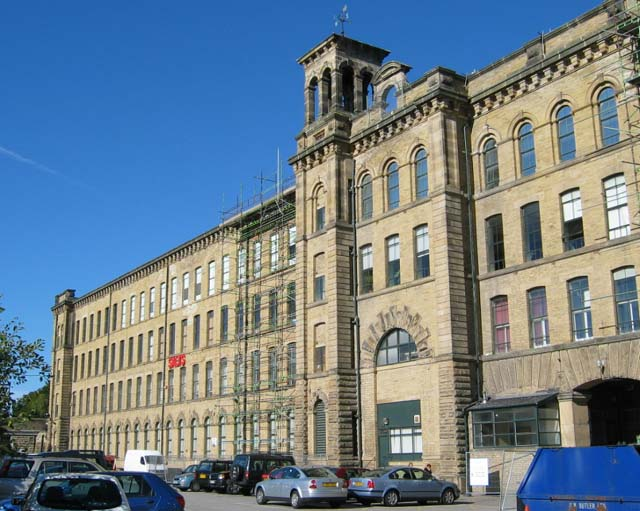
Salts Mill, Saltaire

After Silver bought it among the first events he held were performances by IOU Theatre during the first Bradford Festival. He ran the bar during the festival and came up with the idea of creating a gallery which was devoted to David Hockney. He created the 1853 gallery involving himself in the construction. There have been many theatrical and musical performances since, in various parts of the mill, with Northern Broadsides notably making Salts Mill one of their touring venues. The mill has also housed a number of shops, run by the mill and by independent operators and several businesses, most notably Pace plc.

The work done by Silver in bringing Salts Mill back to life played a part in Saltaire village becoming a UNESCO World Heritage Site in December 2001.

== Personal life ==
In 1972, Silver married Maggie Jackson, and they had two daughters, Zoë and Davina. He was an atheist.

Silver died from cancer at his home in Wetherby on 25 September 1997, aged 47.

== Sources ==
- Biscoe, Stephen (3 September 2003). "Happy birthday for a great survivor". Yorkshire Post. Archived from the original on 6 March 2016.
