= Thalia Campbell =

British anti-nuclear weapon campaigner (born 1937)

- Born: Thalia Delphine Childs; 24 August 1937 (age 89); Torquay, England
- Education: University of Aberystwyth
- Occupations: Art teacher; banner maker
- Known for: Long-serving member of the Greenham Common Women's Peace Camp
- Spouse: Ian Campbell

Thalia Delphine Campbell (née Childs; born 24 August 1937) is a retired teacher and lecturer, and an activist who was one of the founders of the Greenham Common Women's Peace Camp, where she was the chief banner maker. She produced over 250 banners, many of which were hung on the fences of the RAF Greenham Common base which hosted American cruise missiles.

== Early life and education ==
Campbell was born in Torquay, England on 24 August 1937. Her father had a tailor's shop on the town's seafront. With socialist parents, she became politically aware from a young age, influenced particularly by her grandmother, a theosophist, who had witnessed the suffragettes clashing with the police in London in the early 20th century. She took a two-year teacher-training course at Matlock College in Matlock, Derbyshire, and became a primary school teacher. She married Ian Campbell and they had four children in the 1960s, towards the end of that decade moving to Wales. Between 1973 and 1976, she studied art at the University of Aberystwyth, eventually becoming an extramural lecturer.

== Activism ==
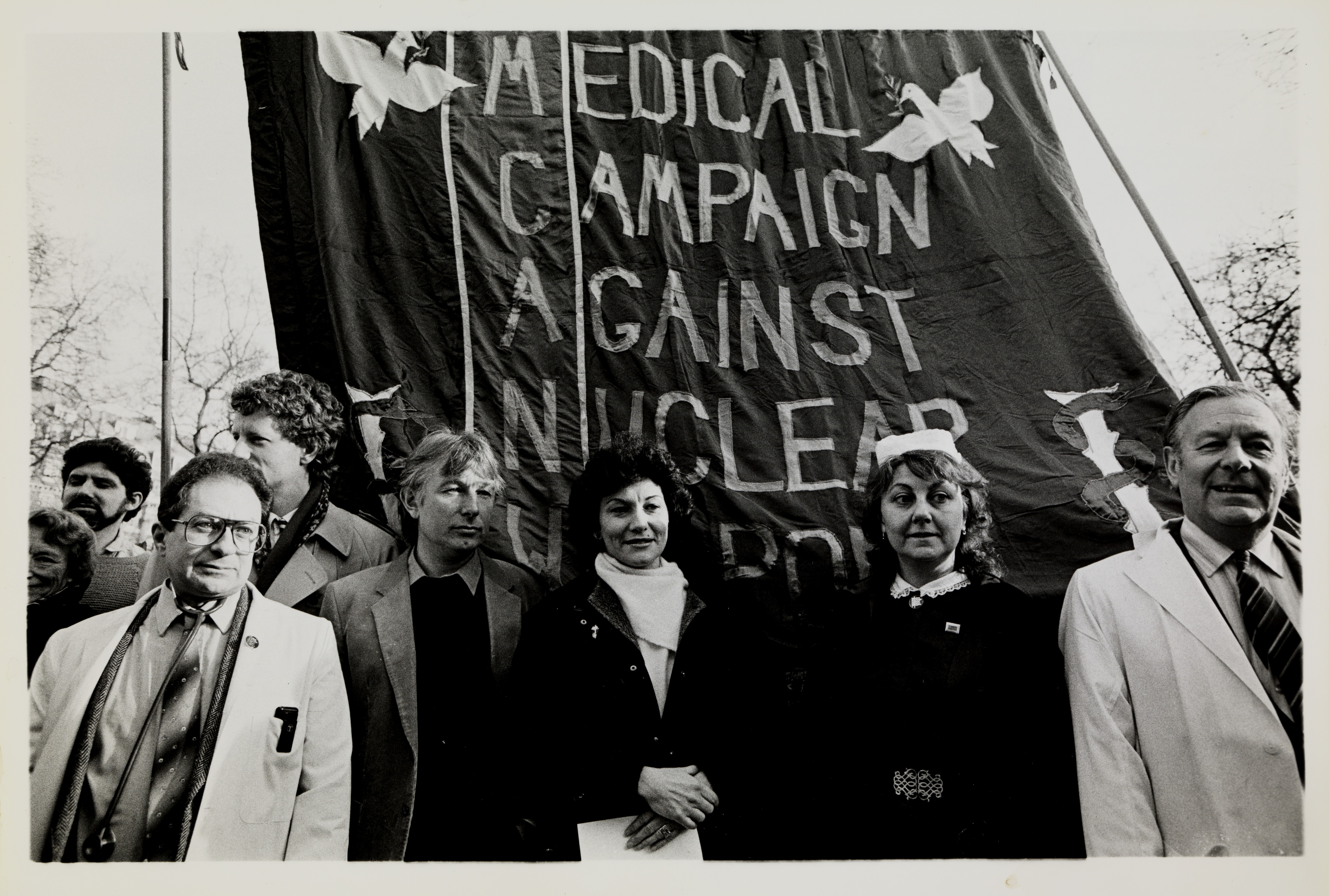
A Medical Campaign Against Nuclear Weapons banner designed by Campbell

In 1981, Campbell was one of the founders of the Greenham Common Women's Peace Camp. She was a member of Women for Life on Earth, an anti-nuclear, Welsh women's peace movement opposed to the dumping of nuclear waste in Wales. The group was originally founded in early 1981 by Ann Pettitt and a group of friends, including Karmen Cutler, Liney Seward and Lynne Whittemore. A June 1981 Campaign for Nuclear Disarmament demonstration at RAF Brawdy, which had become a US listening post, was addressed solely by men, prompting Pettitt to get on the stage to make an impromptu speech. This was followed by the organisation of a women's peace march involving walking 120 miles from Cardiff to RAF Greenham Common between 27 August and 5 September 1981. Once there, many women decided to stay. Campbell quickly became well known for making banners to display on the military base's perimeter fence. The first banner she made for the camp embroidered all the names of the marchers, as well as others who had provided support. This is believed to be the only complete record of those who participated in the march.

The media caught up with the marchers as they crossed the Severn Bridge. The fact that mainly women were marching became the main issue as far as the press was concerned. According to Campbell, journalists asked challenging questions while telling their photographers to lie on the ground "to take photographs of four teenage girls' legs and knickers". She decided then to make banners in order to "kill them with beauty". After arrival at Greenham, banners soon became a way for the women to translate their thoughts into an immediate message.

Women for Life on Earth had already created a few banners but they lacked the impact that Campbell thought was necessary. The very first was made in Whittemore's garden with an old sheet. The second, made by Campbell and a group of teenage girls during the march, also used an old sheet, held in place by bamboo sticks. This was designed to be carried at the end of the march to explain to delayed drivers why they were being held up. Soon after arriving at Greenham the marchers decided to set up a permanent camp there and after a time Campbell went back to Wales and began to make banners. The first involved annoying her son by using his satin bedspread. She decided on a historical reference. Across the bedspread she stitched "Women's Struggle Won The Vote, Use it For Disarmament". She considered that reference to the suffragettes was very apt as they had been vilified in the press in the same way the Greenham women were now being criticised, as "bad mothers". Every time she travelled back to Greenham Common with new banners, they would be tied to the fence surrounding the base.

Campbell formed a makeshift factory to make banners in her own home. Lacking a sewing machine, she used to farm out work to willing neighbours. The banners had to be strong to withstand the wind and rain and to fulfil multiple uses. They were often attached to the perimeter fence but were also used as blankets for babies, etc. Each was double sewn, something she learnt from her husband who had been in the navy and had sewn sails. She made postcards of some of the banners to sell to visitors and offset some of her costs. Later, her activities grew into a business together with her husband, in which they produced banners for trade unions and local labour parties, which led to accusations that she was commercialising Greenham. Both had been artists before doing this work. They were able to identify companies that would let them have end-of-roll fabrics to incorporate into the banners. Use of colours was carefully planned to ensure that the banners would be readable from a distance.

One of her most recognised banners was called Greenham Common Women's Peace Camp. It depicted the Greenham women's methods of resistance: among which were wire cutters for breaking the fence; a group of women holding hands suggestive of the "Embrace the Base" protest to circle the perimeter fence, and the radical symbol of peace embodied by doves and the peace sign. Recognition of her work spread outside the UK. Art students chose to do theses on peace camp banners and she was invited to many countries. Consequently, much of her work is also spread across the globe. She and her son have attempted to catalogue the banners she worked on but have not found them all. However, many of her banners can now be found in the Peace Museum at Saltaire in West Yorkshire and others at the National Museum Cardiff.
