= Felicity Dean =

British actress

- Dean in 2017
- Born: 24 January 1959 (age 67); Westminster, London, England
- Occupation: Actress
- Years active: 1977-2023

Felicity Jane Dean (born 24 January 1959) is a British actress, who is critically acclaimed for her extensive work in film and on stage, including works with, The Royal Shakespeare Company, Al Pacino, HBO, Sir Jonathan Miller and Joseph Losey.

== Early life ==
Dean was born at St George's Hospital at Hyde Park Corner, London in 1959. She attended the Hurst Lodge School in Sunningdale England. She left the school winning the 'De Valois Prize' for Drama.

== Career ==
=== Film ===
Her film career began when she was cast as Lady Jane Grey in the 1977 feature film The Prince and the Pauper opposite Mark Lester, Oliver Reed, Raquel Welch and Charlton Heston. In 1978 she was labelled "One of the 10 Women to Watch" in that year by Cosmopolitan magazine, and appeared in the rarely seen comedy film Son of Hitler, opposite Bud Cort and Peter Cushing. In 1979 she was cast in the role of Caroline in the Mike Leigh film Who's Who. Dean played the role of Dawn Meadows in Joseph Losey's 1985 feature film Steaming opposite Vanessa Redgrave, Sarah Miles and Diana Dors. She also appeared that same year in Water, directed by Dick Clement. She played Sarah opposite Michael Caine, Billy Connolly and Leonard Rossiter.

In 1985 Dean played Betsy in the Hugh Hudson film Revolution opposite Al Pacino and Donald Sutherland. She has continued to work with Pacino on his own personal projects.

In 1987 Dean played Cynthia Goodburn in The Whistle Blower, again opposite Michael Caine alongside Nigel Havers.

In 2011 Dean played the role of Jacqui in The Wedding Video directed by Nigel Cole opposite Harriet Walter, Rufus Hound and Robert Webb.

=== Stage ===
Dean has had an extensive stage career. In 1982 she auditioned for the Royal Shakespeare Company and originated the role of Annie in Good by C. P. Taylor. This production transferred to London's West End and then to Broadway.

Other stage work has included An Honourable Trade directed by Mike Bradwell for the Royal Court Theatre, Olivia in Twelfth Night for Nancy Meckler, for the Royal Shakespeare Company, Bianca in The Taming of the Shrew directed by Jonathan Miller, Julietta in Hyde Park, and Caroline in The Churchill Play, both for Barry Kyle.

In 1994, Dean played Imogen in Wicked Old Men for director Jude Kelly at the West Yorkshire Playhouse. Dean played Fanny Wilton in the Richard Eyre production of John Gabriel Borkman at The National Theatre in 1996 opposite Paul Scofield, Eileen Atkins and Vanessa Redgrave. Dean received critical acclaim for this role. John Gross of The Sunday Telegraph wrote "Felicity Dean is particularly impressive as Erhart's soignee friend Mrs Wilton". The Spectator added: "Felicity Dean also gives a powerful star turn as Fanny Wilton"

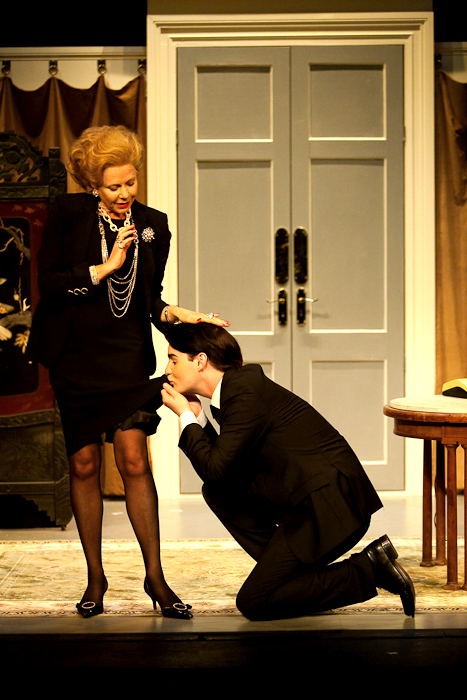
Felicity Dean with Jos Vantyler in Swimming at The Ritz, 2010

In 1998, Dean took the role of Masha in Three Sisters at Birmingham Rep under the direction of Bill Bryden, opposite Charles Dance. For this Dean was nominated for The Critics Guild Award for Best Actress. Charles Spencer of The Daily Telegraph wrote of her performance "Among a fine cast Felicity Dean is outstanding, playing Masha with the lazy grace of an indulged cat. To see this poised woman reduced to untrammelled desperation when her lover leaves is deeply upsetting..."

In 2002 she also received critical acclaim for her roles in The Coast of Utopia directed by Trevor Nunn again at the National Theatre. 2003 saw her again under the direction of Barry Kyle, this time at Shakespeare's Globe as Regan in King Lear. Charles Spencer of The Daily Telegraph said that "Felicity Dean doesn't confine herself merely to capturing Regan's spite. She brings a great blast of sexuality to the stage, presenting a woman who is clearly turned on by evil. The effect is both thrilling and profoundly discomforting."

In 2007 she played the role of Dona Elvira in Don Juan, directed by Neil Bartlett at the Lyric Hammersmith. David Giles cast her in 2009 in Underfoot in Showbusiness, a fast-paced comedy from New York writer Charles Leipart. Giles cast her again in 2009 as Pamela Harriman in another Charles Leipart play, Swimming at The Ritz, based around the life of Harriman in which Dean played opposite Jos Vantyler. After Giles' death in early 2010, the production was revived, due to its initial success, this time under the direction of Roland Jaquarello.

In September 2013, Sir Jonathan Miller directed the Gala Performance of William Shakespeare's King Lear at The Old Vic in London. Dean played Goneril opposite Joss Ackland as King Lear, Michael York, Tony Robinson, Greta Scacchi, Honeysuckle Weeks, John Nettles, Robert Young, Tony Britton, Shaun Dooley, Barrie Rutter and Jos Vantyler.

In 2014, Dean played the lead role in The Long Road South alongside Michael Brandon, a play by Paul Minx. The press said of Dean's performance: "Felicity Dean's Carol Ann marks the play's standout performance as she quakes about the stage in sliver heels, brimming with morose longing."

=== Television ===
In 1977, she played a significant guest role as Sara Seaford in the second episode of the first season of the hard-hitting police drama The Professionals, entitled 'The Female Factor' (by Brian Clemens) starring opposite Gordon Jackson, Martin Shaw and Lewis Collins. English novelist Rebecca West, perhaps best known for her reports on the Nuremberg Trials, personally picked Dean to play Laura Bowen, the heroine of her novel The Birds Fall Down in a five-part BBC adaptation produced by Jonathan Powell in 1978. Critically acclaimed, this led to Dean going on to play many parts on television including Guinevere in The Legend of King Arthur for the BBC in 1978, Belinda Harlowe in The Far Pavilions opposite Ben Cross and Rupert Everett in 1984, and the Lynda La Plante series Trial & Retribution in 1999. She appeared in Midsomer Murders “Dead Man’s Eleven” (1999) as Tara Cavendish.

Dean went on to play Mrs Clay in Persuasion, directed by Roger Michell. She appeared in The Last of the Blonde Bombshells with Judi Dench and Ian Holm, again written by Alan Plater (2000). She acted in Midsomer Murders “Dance with the Dead” (2006) as Frances Kirby. Also as Dido in Stuart: A Life Backwards in 2007, and as Elaine in the series Talk to Me with Max Beesley in 2007.

She has also appeared in many popular television programmes between 1990 and 2009, including Stay Lucky, Midsomer Murders, Peak Practice, Casualty, New Tricks, Rosemary & Thyme, Die Kinder, Van der Valk, The Inspector Alleyn Mysteries, Kavanagh QC, Wycliffe, Hetty Wainthropp Investigates, Lovejoy, Doctors, and Murder in Suburbia.

In 2017, she played the aged Queen Elizabeth I in the docu-drama Elizabeth I narrated by Drs Susannah Lipscombe and Dan Jones. In 2018, Dean portrayed Princess Margaret, Countess of Snowdon at The Park Theatre in A Princess Undone. In February 2022, Dean made another appearance in an episode of the BBC soap opera Doctors as Barbara Hopkins.
