= Hurst Lodge School =

Independent school in England

Coordinates: 51.388°N 0.671°W

Location
- Yateley Hall, Firgrove Road; Yateley, Hampshire, GU46 6HJ; England

Information
- Type: Private school
- Established: 1945
- Founder: Dorice Stainer
- Specialist: performing arts
- Headmistress: Victoria Smit
- Staff: 30 full-time, 20 part-time
- Gender: Co-educational
- Age: 3 to 18
- Enrolment: 250
- Houses: Stainer, Scott, Randall, Eden
- Website: https://www.hurstlodgeschool.co.uk/

Hurst Lodge School, established in 1945, is a private school originally based in Ascot, Berkshire, England, for girls and boys aged three to eighteen, with about 250 children of all ages. The school is now located in Yateley.

== Overview ==
Hurst Lodge School, originally established in 1945 is located at Yateley Hall in Hampshire. The school moved to the Blackwater, Hampshire site, following a merger with Hawley Place school in 2018. The school was known as HawleyHurst between 2018 and 2020, In 2020, however, the merged school closed. A new school then opened and renamed Hurst Lodge school, returning to the same ethos and with the same leadership team as Hurst Lodge School that was based in Ascot Berkshire.

In September 2021, the whole school relocated to a new permanent base, Yateley Hall in Hampshire.

== History ==
Miss Dorice Stainer, of Hurst Lodge, founded the school in the aftermath of the Second World War as a course of "Dancing Classes". A sister of the film star Leslie Howard, and also of Irene Howard, the London casting director of Metro-Goldwyn-Mayer, in the 1920s Stainer had been a partner in 'The Misses Stainer and Sinclair, Dancing Teachers', of 39, Onslow Square, South Kensington, London S.W.7, and after 1928 had continued the business alone at the same address. Immediately before the War, she had been a travelling dance teacher based in Ascot, teaching classes at Camberley, Godalming, Guildford, Sunningdale, Virginia Water, and a variety of schools around England.

The actress Juliet Stevenson, a pupil of Miss Stainer's at Hurst Lodge in the 1960s, has described her as "a progressively educational woman who had been a prima ballerina and who believed the arts were fundamental to a child's education".

According to an article in The Times published in 1986, when Sarah Ferguson, future Duchess of York, was about to leave the school in 1977, she observed a tradition by diving into the swimming pool naked at midnight on the eve of her last day. The Duchess paid an official visit to her old school on 13 March 1989. In 1992, writing of Sarah Ferguson's time at Hurst Lodge, the journalist Valerie Grove called it "an expensive boarding school that turned out jolly Chalet Girls with lots of bounce but not too many O-levels". In that year's school performance tables, the proportion of girls sitting GCSEs who gained five passes at grades A to C was given as 50%, by comparison with 98% for Wycombe Abbey and 97% for the Dame Alice Harpur School. In 1998 only four pupils were entered for two or more A-levels, but their examination results were slightly better than the average for schools in the Royal Borough of Windsor and Maidenhead. In 1999, the school entered only one pupil for A-Levels, but as the result of her excellent results it appeared in the list of Top Independent Schools published in The Times on 25 November.

In 2001 The Daily Telegraph reported that Hurst Lodge was the third most expensive prep school in Great Britain, coming just after Colet Court, the junior school of St Paul's, and the Dragon School, Oxford, but before Horris Hill, Papplewick, St John's Beaumont, Cheam and Ludgrove, all eight of which then charged more than £13,000 a year.

In early 2018, Hurst Lodge merged with Hawley Place, under the name HawleyHurst, on a site in Blackwater, Hampshire. At the same time as the merger, the school was given a warning from the Department of Education, lifted the next year. In 2020 the HawleyHurst name was changed and the school reverted to its original name, Hurst Lodge.

== Inspections ==
As HawleyHurst, the school's most recent inspection by the Independent Schools Inspectorate was in 2019.

The inspection found that attainment at GCSE and A level was higher than in state schools, but that "The school does not meet all of the required standards in the schedule to the Education (Independent School Standards) Regulations 2014, and relevant requirements of the statutory framework for the Early Years Foundation Stage".

== Headmistresses ==
- 1945– c. 1970: Dorice Stainer
- 1973: D. A. Carter
- 1974– c. 1980: Celia Merrick
- 1987: A. M. Smit
- 2006–2011: Victoria Smit
- 2011–2012: Kate Leiper
- 2012–present: Victoria Smit (again)

== Notable former pupils ==
- Felicity Dean, actress
- Emma Forbes, television and radio presenter
- Jenna Randall, Commonwealth Games silver medallist in synchronised swimming
- Juliet Stevenson, actress
- Belinda Stewart-Wilson, actress
- Sarah Ferguson
- Ellie Bamber, actress
- Kerry Ingram, actress
