= Saltaire Festival =

Festival in Bradford, West Yorkshire, England

Coordinates: 53.83717°N 1.79026°W

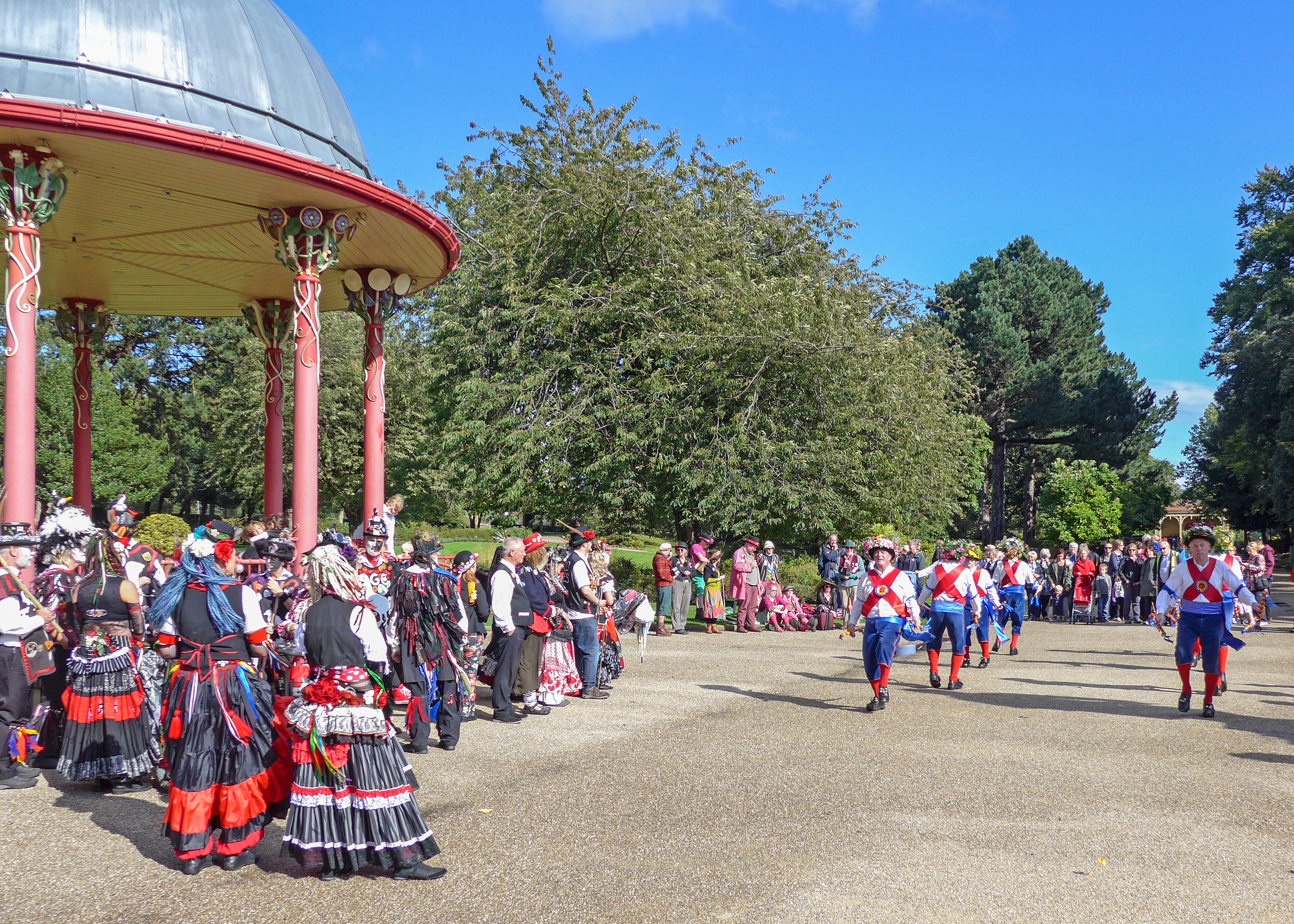
Saltaire Festival

Saltaire Festival occurs each September in the village of Saltaire, a World Heritage Site in the Metropolitan District of Bradford, West Yorkshire.

The Festival was founded in 2003 to celebrate 200 years since the birth of Titus Salt and the 150th anniversary of the date that he founded Saltaire. It now occurs every year for 10 days in September, attracting some 30,000 people to celebrate the local community and its heritage through the arts. Events include family and children's activities, live music, markets, drama and spoken word performances, exhibitions, and food and drink.

It is self-funding and not-for-profit, run by a registered charity staffed by a small team of local volunteers.
