= Peace Museum =

Museum in Saltaire, England

The Peace Museum
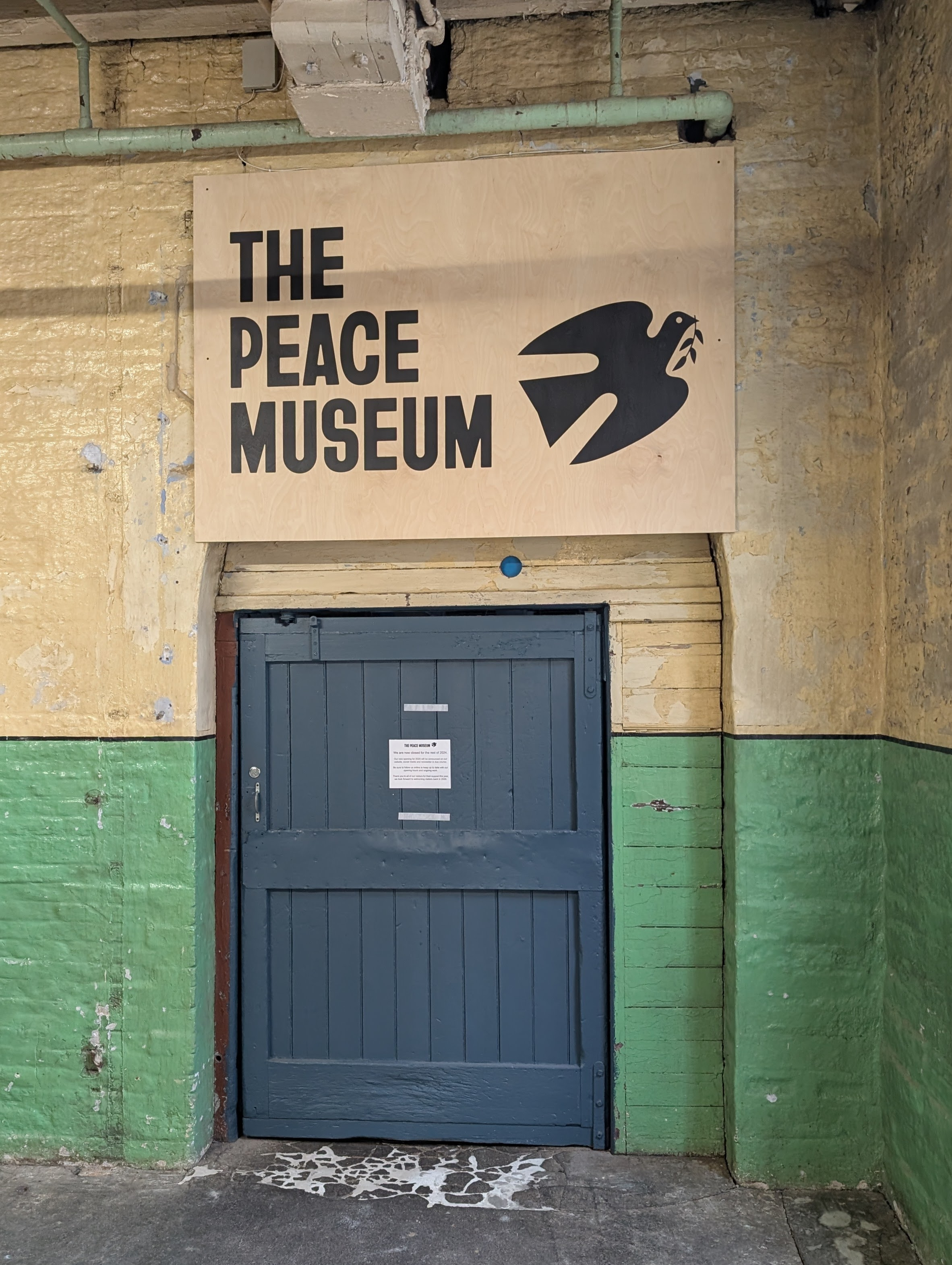
- Entrance to The Peace Museum at Salts Mill
- Established: 1994
- Location: Salt's Mill, Saltaire, Bradford
- Coordinates: 53°50′20″N 1°47′16″W
- Accreditation: Arts Council England (AN:1778)
- Collection size: 16,000 exhibits
- Website: peacemuseum.org.uk

The Peace Museum in Saltaire, West Yorkshire is the only museum in the UK dedicated to the history and stories of peace, peacemakers and the peace movement.

The initial idea of creating a peace museum arose in the mid-1980s from Gerald Drewett of the Give Peace a Chance Trust. In 1990 this was carried forward when Shireen Shah, an MA student at Bradford University’s Peace Studies Department, wrote a dissertation proposing a ‘Museum for Peace’. Two years on, the International Network of Museums for Peace held its first conference at the University of Bradford in 1992, during which it was proposed that a Peace Museum be established in Bradford. A committee was established to seek finance and general support for the idea. Initially called ‘The National Peace Museum Project’, the museum was established in 1994 through a five-year grant from the Joseph Rowntree Charitable Foundation and operated from a temporary site in Bradford in the Wool Exchange. In 1998 the museum moved to the top floor of 10 Piece Hall Yard, in Bradford city centre.

The museum has a varied temporary exhibition programme, hosting several exhibitions and displays throughout the year. Past exhibitions have included 'A force for peace? The History of European Cooperation' (ended 2016) exploring the peace history behind the European Union, 'Challenging the Fabric of Society' showcasing the protest banners that are part of its textile collection (until March 2017), and 'Remembering the Kindertransport' to commemorate Holocaust Memorial Day (until April 2017).

The museum closed its Piece Hall Yard site in 2020 and reopened at Salts Mill, Saltaire, in August 2024. The museum's artifacts had been stored in the basement of Salts Mill in the interim. Between August and November 2026 the museum was fitted with heating and air conditioning. The museum held its reopening celebrations on 14 November 2026.
