= The Whistle Blower =

1986 British film by Simon Langton

- Directed by: Simon Langton
- Written by: John Hale (book); Julian Bond
- Produced by: Geoffrey Reeve
- Starring: Michael Caine; James Fox; Nigel Havers; Felicity Dean; John Gielgud; Kenneth Colley; Gordon Jackson; Alan Kershaw; Barry Foster
- Cinematography: Fred Tammes
- Edited by: Bob Morgan
- Music by: John Scott
- Distributed by: Rank Film Distributors
- Release dates: December 1986 (UK); 10 July 1987 (U.S.)
- Running time: 100 minutes
- Country: United Kingdom
- Language: English
- Box office: $1,500,000

The Whistle Blower is a 1986 British spy thriller film directed by Simon Langton and starring Michael Caine, James Fox, Nigel Havers, Felicity Dean, John Gielgud, Kenneth Colley, Gordon Jackson (in his final film appearance), David Langton, and Barry Foster. It is based on the 1984 novel of the same name by John Hale.

== Plot ==
Frank (Caine) is a retired British naval officer, now runs a small business. His bright but naive and idealistic son, Bob (Nigel Havers), works as a linguist at GCHQ, the top secret British intelligence listening station, translating intercepted conversations from behind the Iron Curtain.

The film opens with footage of the Remembrance Day parade in Whitehall in the present (c. 1985), attended by the Queen Elizabeth II, and shows Frank in the crowd, wearing medals, then moves to Bob's flat some months earlier, when Bob tells his father of an upheaval at GCHQ, where there is evidence of a Soviet mole, and security is encouraging staff to report on one another, as the leak must be found before their American counterparts find out about it. He tells him that he's planning to leave and marry Cynthia Goodburn (Felicity Dean) who has a young daughter. Frank isn't pleased. The scene cuts to a room in British Intelligence, where Bruce (Gordon Jackson) and another are recording their conversation. Frank is warned by an old Navy chum Greig (Barry Foster), who's now with MI6, that his business could be ruined by any indiscretion on his son's part.

At their next meeting, which is being secretly monitored, Bob tells his father he is about to reveal what he knows about illegal operations conducted by his department, and after some soul-searching, contacts investigative reporter Bill Pickett (Kenneth Colley). Shortly afterward, Frank is informed that Bob has died in a rooftop fall, perhaps suicide, but a verdict of accidental death is recorded. Back at Bob's flat, Frank is confronted by Pickett, but refuses to comment. In the pocket of his son's jacket are a couple of newspaper clippings — one tells how Cynthia's husband, who ostensibly committed suicide, was a colleague of the convicted spy Dodgson. The other is about the death of Kedge, Dodgson's friend, who fell under a train.

Frank has a meeting with Pickett, who is subsequently killed in an elaborately staged traffic accident. Pickett was on his way to East Grinstead, having organised a rendezvous with Bob's contact and Frank. At Bob's funeral, Frank is approached by Bob's friend and fellow British intelligence linguist Mark. Frank learns from Mark that it was his Navy friend Greig who quizzed him about Bob's loyalty. Frank gets Greig drunk and extracts from him the confession that he was at Bob's flat the night of his death, but did not kill him — his job was only to leave the door open for the strongarm boys. He also reveals the name of the mole as Sir Adrian Chapple.

Leaving Greig in his drunken stupor, Frank is picked up by British Intelligence and driven to a country house, where he is confronted by Secretary to the Cabinet (David Langton) and Lord (James Fox). They explain to him that his son was out of control, and was killed to protect a plan to mislead the Americans as to the extent of the depth of Russian intelligence's operatives inside British operations, in the hope that they could continue to gain intelligence from the CIA. They have left Chapple in place until they can assess the extent of the damage caused. They advise Frank that should he go public with any of this information, he or Cynthia and her daughter would be the next to suffer.

The film returns to the present, and the Remembrance Day parade. Frank fronts up to Chapple's Whitehall residence, and being mistaken for a collector for charity, is admitted inside. After being confronted with the facts, Chapple admits to spying for Russia. Frank orders him to write a full confession, which he does, but as Frank is reading it, Chapple produces a gun and demands its return. Frank grabs the gun, which goes off, killing Chapple. Leaving his signed confession, seemingly a suicide note, Frank returns to the parade, joining the marchers.

== Cast ==
- Michael Caine - Frank Jones
- James Fox - Lord
- Nigel Havers - Robert Arthur Jones, only referred to as "Bob"
- John Gielgud - Sir Adrian Chapple, permanent secretary, Ministry of Defence
- Felicity Dean - Cynthia Goodburn
- Barry Foster - Charles Greig
- Gordon Jackson - Bruce
- Kenneth Colley - Bill Pickett
- David Langton - Secretary to the Cabinet
- Dinah Stabb - Rose
- James Simmons - Mark, Robert's friend and fellow linguist
- Katherine Reeve - Tiffany Goodburn, Cynthia's daughter
- Bill Wallis - Ramsay Charles Dodgson, convicted spy
- Trevor Cooper - Inspector Bourne
- Peter Miles - Stephen Kedge, friend of spy Dodgson
- David Shaughnessy - Medical officer
- Patrick Holt - Irate driver

== Production ==
The film was largely shot on location in Cheltenham, Gloucestershire, home of GCHQ, which forms the premise of the film. Cheltenham Racecourse, Cheltenham Spa station, Cheltenham Cemetery and the Promenade feature in the film (Bob is interred in the former location). The London 'tube' murder scene was actually filmed on British Rail's Waterloo & City Line (which at the time did not run on Saturday afternoons or Sundays so was an accessible location for filming).

== Response ==
Though it was given a limited release, the film opened to positive reviews. On the review aggregator website Rotten Tomatoes, 90% of 10 critics' reviews are positive, with an average rating of 7.6/10.

== Home media ==
The film was released in Australia on DVD (PAL) by Flashback Entertainment.
