= The Second Maiden's Tragedy =

1611 play probably by Thomas Middleton

George Buc's license at the end of the manuscript. It reads "This second Maydens tragedy (for it hath no name inscribed) may with the reformations now be acted publikely."

The Second Maiden's Tragedy is a Jacobean play that survives only in manuscript. It was written in 1611, and performed in the same year by the King's Men. The manuscript was acquired but never printed by the publisher Humphrey Moseley after the closure of the theatres in 1642. In 1807, the manuscript was acquired by the British Museum. Victorian poet and critic, Algernon Swinburne, was the first to attribute this work to Thomas Middleton; this judgement has since been joined by most editors and scholars. The play has received few modern revivals. It was the opening production at the newly refurbished Hackney Empire studio in 2006 starring Alexander Fiske-Harrison and Jos Vantyler.

== Title ==
The play's original title is unknown. The manuscript bears no title, and the censor, George Buc, added a note beginning "This second Maiden's Tragedy (for it hath no name inscribed)...". Buc was possibly comparing the play to Beaumont and Fletcher's The Maid's Tragedy. Buc's comment confused a seventeenth-century owner of the manuscript, Humphrey Moseley, who listed the play in the Stationers' Register as The Maid's Tragedy, 2nd Part. Buc's title has stuck and the play is usually referred to as The Second Maiden's Tragedy.

However, two recent editors of the play have preferred to retitle it. In his anthology Four Jacobean Sex Tragedies, Martin Wiggins argues that since the word "second" refers to the play, not to a character (there is no "second maiden"), Buc was actually calling the play The Maiden's Tragedy. In Thomas Middleton: The Collected Works, Julia Briggs goes further: pointing out that the word "maiden" never appears in the play, she retitles it The Lady's Tragedy, after the unnamed female protagonist.

Briggs was anticipated by the 1994 Hen and Chicken production in Bristol, which also used The Lady's Tragedy. Other theatrical productions have also retitled the play. For example, in 1984, the first, modern professional production at London's Upstream Theatre called it The Tyrant's Tragedy, after the play's primary protagonist. The play has similarly been known in the past as simply The Tyrant, identifying it as being a lost play by Philip Massinger of the same title.

== Authorship ==
The back page of the manuscript, featuring a title and three authorship attributions by its later owners. The names of Thomas Goffe and George Chapman are heavily crossed out, the words "by Will Shakespeare" less heavily so.

=== Thomas Middleton ===
The play's authorship is also contested. On the manuscript, three crossed-out attributions in seventeenth century hands attribute it first to Thomas Goffe, then to William Shakespeare, and then to George Chapman. Today, however, the scholarly consensus is that the true author was Thomas Middleton, as indicated by linguistic analysis, and by its similarity with other Middleton plays. It was first published under Middleton's name in Martin Wiggins's anthology Four Jacobean Sex Tragedies (1998), and subsequently in the 2007 Collected Works of Middleton.

=== Shakespeare and Cardenio ===
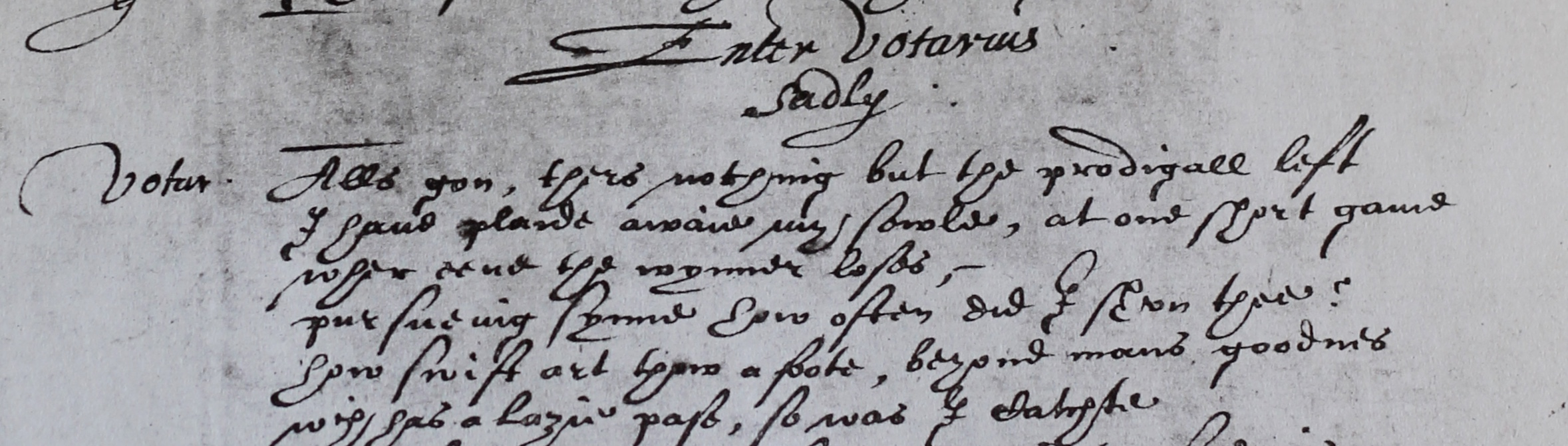
Act II, scene ii, "Enter Votarius sadly. VOTARIUS All's gone; there's nothing but the prodigal left: I have played away my soul at one short game Where e'en the winner loses. Pursuing sin, how often did I shun thee! How swift art thou afoot, beyond man's goodness, Which has a lazy pace! So was I catched."

Professional handwriting expert Charles Hamilton claimed in a 1994 book that the manuscript of The Second Maiden's Tragedy is in fact the lost Shakespearean play Cardenio and indeed that the handwriting is Shakespeare's. Scholars have given little consideration to this idea, agreeing with the Middleton attribution. The play does appear to draw on elements of Don Quixote, as Cardenio is assumed to have done. Julia Briggs points out that as "Shakespeare's Cardenio" the play received greater awareness and acquired new theatrical life, with several productions in the 1990s.

Although The Second Maiden’s Tragedy has been generally credited to Middleton, there is evidence that Shakespeare could have contributed to the play. When examining the manuscript, there are slips of paper that were added to the prompt book, which shows revisions or notes. These slips of paper have been examined and it is quite certain that Middleton did not write these revisions, as they do not resemble his handwriting. However, the notes resemble the handwriting assumed to be Shakespeare's. It is also possible that Shakespeare could have written these notes because at the time the play was to be produced, Shakespeare was still in the King's Court, and could have been working on the play and had influence. Therefore, despite the consensus that Shakespeare is not responsible for the writing of The Second Maiden’s Tragedy, it is quite possible that Shakespeare was involved in its production and revision.

== Plot vs. sub-plot ==
The Second Maiden's Tragedy contains both a plot and a subplot, and they share similar and different characteristics. The plot and subplot are connected to each other only loosely, in that the main plot's protagonist, Govianus, is the brother of Anselmus, one of the primary characters in the subplot. Thematically, however, there are more interesting connections at work. The purpose behind having a plot and a subplot is to have two stories that magnify the "fundamental contrasts inherent in the material". The inspiration behind the subplot comes from Miguel de Cervantes's Don Quixote. From Cervantes's text, Middleton wrote a similar story and created a different resolution to the subplot. There are similarities and differences between the two.

=== Similarities ===
Both stories revolve around the women of the stories and the conflicts they face when it comes to love. Within the plot, the Lady is to be married to Govianus, but the Tyrant constantly pursues her. Within the subplot, the Wife is married to Anselmus, and a man who is not her husband also pursues her. In each plot, both women must choose whether to remain faithful to their husbands, or whether to give in to lust, and this is where the two plots diverge.

=== Differences ===
The first difference is that the two women are faced with a test, which leads to two different outcomes. This test is used to understand whether or not both the Lady and the Wife will remain faithful to Govianus and Anselmus. The Lady passes the test and because she does, she is given peace and salvation for her decision. The Wife fails to remain faithful and she faces corrosive conflict; because of her decision, the Wife is constantly in conflict with her own guilty conscience. The plot contains a "blameless protagonist whose wholly undeserved catastrophe is caused by the persecution of a villain and is treated as triumphant martyrdom". The Lady, after her death, is declared a martyr and is further glorified by those who surround her, especially Govianus. Govianus states, "Come thow delitious treasure of mankinde to him that knowes what vertuous woman is" as a way of honoring the Lady one final time. He refers to her as a woman of virtue, even though she commits suicide. Her body is "placed on a throne and crowned, before it solemnly bourne back into her tomb". The Lady's death is one of honor and a death that benefits other people. Within the subplot, the protagonist is faced with immense feelings of guilt. These feelings result in her ultimate surrender, which is exposed through her choice of suicide. The Wife's death is described as a reckless display of despair, and she is not given the honor that the Lady received. Instead, she "has dragged her husband and her lover down with her to degradation and death". The Wife ruins the esteem of both her husband and her lover and leaves a mark on their reputation forever. After her death, Anselmus states, “"The serpents wisdome is in weemens lust" because he believes that the devil takes part in all that the Wife goes through in the story.

== Major themes ==
Throughout The Second Maiden's Tragedy there are many prominent themes. Necrophilia was brought up when the Tyrant wanted to have sex with the dead body of the Lady whom he was trying to preserve, this could be viewed as attachment. The Tyrant was fascinated with the Lady's beauty and after she killed herself to escape his grasp this was the only way he could feel satisfied. She would not grant him access to her body throughout the first act of the play when the Tyrant asked her to marry him. By refusing the requests of his authority she was then placed under house arrest only furthering tensions between the Tyrant and the Lady. The Tyrant also made attempts to take the Lady to bed with him which were unsuccessful. This fascination would lead to his death at the end of the play. The Lady shows great sense of pride in upholding her morals throughout the play. "The Lady resists temptation […] the Lady is free from taint […] and the Lady meets her death with noble conviction." This is holding herself to a high standard which in turn makes her body more desirable by the Tyrant. The Female corpse can be seen as a prominent theme in The Second Maiden's Tragedy because it was the center of attention after the Lady's death.

Face Painting could be seen as a sense of life because the Tyrant uses face paint so the corpse of the Lady would seem more alive. This relates back to his original plan of using the body for necrophilia, as he was trying to make the body lifelike again. The female body could be seen as an erotic figure because sexual attractiveness and deadness can become indistinguishable." This scene in the play could have been used to spark voyeuristic interests from the audience. Using the female body as an object of infatuation would allow the Tyrants ambitions to be shown after the climax of the play. There are also underlying influences of face painting, as the strategic use of face painting was popular during the Renaissance. T.W. Craik comments that face painting often is used to signify moral corruption. This is significant because The Second Maiden’s Tragedy can be viewed as a commentary on the political life. During the time that the play was written, it was believed that the court of James I was "very much in need of moral cleansing". Therefore, the presence of face painting in The Second Maiden’s Tragedy exemplifies the sin and corruption of James I. Furthermore, the poisoned lips which lead to the Tyrant's death is also significant. It was well known that in the Jacobean era, makeup was in fact poisonous. The use of Lady's lips poisoning the Tyrant can be seen to draw attention to sexual corruption.This also relates to the belief that those in power were corrupted during the time of The Second Maiden’s Tragedy.

The female body of the Wife also caused problems within the play and controversially led to the climax of the play. The Wife kills Votarius after he tried seducing her after he fell in love with her unexpectedly. Anselmus was pleased to see her faithfulness so he killed Leonella who accused the Wife of being unfaithful. However, this action causes the Wife's death in a sword fight between Anselmus and Bellarius. Female action sparked men's motives to be brought forth which caused this bloody scene. Loyalty and trust are also important because many relationships throughout the play were questioned just like Anselmus' wife. Votarius' wife had proven her love for him and Anselmus showed doubts about his wife's. This sent the characters into disarray when Votarius actually fell in love with Anselmus' wife who had shown her nonexistent loyalty to Anselmus. This loyalty stunt could be seen as ironic to the genre of the play which is a tragedy. This play "concerns characters who are fundamentally blind, who fail to understand the world in which they live, who insist on undoing themselves." However, in this instance the action and feeling of falling in love could not be undone and it turns into disastrous consequences. Chaste within this text is symbolic because the female body is seen as an idol and being unfaithful outside of the marriage would be a big deal. For the male characters in the text such as the Tyrant having sex with multiple people wasn't a problem because he had a lot of power. If a woman did this there could be varying consequences though because of their husbands. Another thing that is interesting is the disconnection between body and spirit. When the Lady died it was clear that her corpse was without spirit since her spirit sought after the rescue of the maternal body from the Tyrant. It can be argued that "the figure of the Lady is divided into three personae that are ultimately irreconcilable." These can be classified as her living body, her desecrated corpse, and her sainted spirit. Each of these played a role in deceiving the Tyrant and making him look like a bad character. Even though the play may demonize the Tyrant as a monster, the presumed forces of virtue ultimately prove complicit in his transgression." These can all be interrelated in The Second Maiden’s Tragedy as the play had many connecting events and themes.

== Major influences ==
There are many cultural and political components that influenced Second Maiden’s Tragedy. A ruler who is after a pure, beautiful, woman was a very popular theme and used often during this time

=== Sophronia ===
The story of a Christian martyr named Sophronia can be viewed as an influence to the plot line of The Second Maiden's Tragedy. She can be seen as an influence due to her similarity to Lady, who kills herself after the Tyrant orders guards to take her and bring her to him. Sophronia also commits suicide, stabbing herself, when an emperor, Maxentius, sends messengers.This influence is plausible because the story and events of Sophronia's death was well known during the time period that the play was written.

=== Religious Influences ===
The death of the character Lady in The Second Maiden's Tragedy can be seen as a parallel to the death and Resurrection of Christ. Similar to the women who visited the tomb of Jesus and could not find his body in the tomb, Govianus goes to visit the tomb of Lady and finds her body gone. An angel tells the women that Jesus is "not here", and the spirit of Lady tells Govianus "I am not here."

=== Talmudic legend and Herod ===
There is a specific reference to a Talmudic legend in The Second Maiden’s Tragedy named Mariamme, which can be seen as a direct influence in the play. It appears in ib. Iii 115–120,"I once read of a Herod, whose affection/pursued a virgin's love, as I did thine, who for the hate she owed him killed himself, as thou too rashly didst, without all pity “. The woman, Mariamne commits suicide, throwing herself off a roof, in order to save herself from marrying Herod, who killed everyone else in her family. This is similar to The Second Maiden’s Tragedy because the Lady kills herself in order to escape the Tyrant, and she has no other family besides her imprisoned father, Helvetius. After her suicide, her body is preserved using honey. This is clearly similar to the death of Lady and her preservation, as ordered by the Tyrant. Once the Tyrant discovers that Lady has killed herself, he is determined to still have her as her wife, and orders an artist to paint her face with makeup so she can appear alive and have sex with the body. The explicit reference shows both the time period in which The Second Maiden’s Tragedy was written in and also shows how outside cultural knowledge influenced the events and plot of the play

== Characters ==
- The Tyrant, the usurping king
- Govianus, the deposed king
- Memphonius, Sophonirus, Helvetius, nobles
- The Lady, daughter to Helvetius, afterwards her spirit
- Votarius, friend to Anselmus
- Anselmus, brother to Govianus
- The Wife to Anselmus
- Leonella, her waiting-woman
- Bellarius, lover to Leonella

== Synopsis ==
The Second Maiden's Tragedy is centered on four main characters: Govianus, the virtuous king of the story, his fiancée who is referred to as the Lady, Govianus' brother Anselmus, and his wife who is referred to as the Wife.

ACT ONE

- The Tyrant has deposed the rightful king Govianus and declares his intent to marry the Lady, Helvetius's daughter. The Tyrant banishes Govianus. Before Govianus is allowed to depart, however, he's forced to watch the Tyrant woo the Lady, so he can see truly everything he's lost. The Lady appears in black and says she can never bend her mind to love the Tyrant, since she's already in love with Govianus and will not give him up. Helvetius encourages the Lady to honor the Tyrant, but she kisses Govianus instead. The Tyrant revokes the banishment, since the Lady is set to depart with Govianus and he refuses to lose her. He's put under house arrest with Memphonius instead. The Lady is locked up too, within sight but out of reach of Govianus, to torment him. The Tyrant instructs Helvetius to move his daughter's heart.
- Anselmus, Govianus's brother, worries over his wife's fidelity with his friend Votarius. He asks Votarius to try to cuckold him in order settle his mind. Wife and Votarius talk about Anselmus, and Wife asks Votarius to help her cheer him up and return him from "the desolate path" because she misses him. Votarius tells Anselmo that his wife is chaste and loves him deeply. Anselmus refuses to believe this. Votarius tries again, this time actually hitting on Wife. In the process, he begins to fall in love with her a little and vows to go from hence and never see her more. She rebukes him, but then also begins to fall in love with him a little. Votarius departs. Wife calls Leonella, her companion, and tells her to never be away from her side, probably to help Wife keep herself in check. Leonella's lover, Bellarius, recognizes the departing Votarius as his enemy, and Leonella vows to let Votarius sleep with Wife so that Bellarius can have the pleasure of watching his enemy fall.

ACT TWO

- Lady and Govianus have befriended their guard, and as long as no one else is around, they have free access to each other and are happy. Helvetius comes to visit Lady and chastises her for her stubbornness and casts aspersions on her parentage. As she remains steadfast, he relents and commends her for her constancy, blesses her, and wishes her joy in Govianus. He then encourages her to take the Tyrant as her lover instead. Govianus enters and shoots at Helvetius, missing him on purpose. He berates Helvetius for forgetting his fatherly bonds and duties. Helvetius recalls himself and apologizes, pledging himself to Govianus, the rightful king.
- Votarius rues his agreement to try Anselmus's wife, since it has led him astray and he is powerless to resist, though he recognizes his sin and error. They welcome Anselmus home, who seems to think he has found his wife and friend honest. Votarius wishes for a way out. Bellarius passes through, and Votarius vows to have him rid of the house. He tells Anselmus he suspects Bellarius of whoremongering, and Anselmus departs to slay him in the upstairs chamber. Bellarius jumps out a window to escape, and Votarius gives chase. Leonella protests that Bellarius is her husband and she would never allow him to sleep with the Wife, and offers instead to Anselmus proof that Votarius cuckolded him.
- Helvetius returns to the Tyrant to tell him Lady isn't coming, and moreover, that Tyrant is a bad man. Tyrant strips Helvetius of all his titles, and Sophonirus claims them, saying he knows a special charm of ten words that will bring Lady to the Tyrant's bed immediately, and offers to leave his own wife in pawn to prove it. Tyrant throws Helvetius in prison. Tyrant sends Sophonirus to Lady with a jewel, and instructions to have her carried away by force if necessary.

ACT THREE

- Sophonirus arrives from the Tyrant to speak with the Lady. Govianus stabs Sophonirus. With his dying breath, Sophonirus tells them that the house is surrounded with men who will break in and steal away the Lady by force. Lady begs Govianus to murder her instead of letting her be stolen and raped by the Tyrant. She prays first and then declares herself ready to die. Govianus protests, but she insists and servants come knocking for Sophonirus. He runs at her with his sword, but faints before he strikes her. She kills herself. Govianus stirs, discovers her body and the servants still knocking, and uses Sophonirus's body to barricade the door. As the door is forced open, they stab Sophonirus's body, taking it to be Govianus. Govianus tells the Tyrant's servants that Sophonirus was cause of the Lady's death, and they carry that story back to the Tyrant, secure in their knowledge that they have done a good turn in killing Sophonirus (who was of course already dead). They carry his body out.

ACT FOUR

- Wife and Votarius set up an encounter designed to make the husband Anselmus think that his wife is faithful forever. This will then allow them to carry on with each other ever after. They'll hide Anselmus in a closet and let him watch Wife turn down Votarius with anger, which will prove her fidelity and his friend's willingness to help. Wife then tells Leonella to hide a weapon in her chamber and to rush to Votarius and remind him to wear "privy armor" so that she can strike him without fear. Leonella relates the plan to Bellarius, who counsels her to forget to remind Votarius to wear the armor, and by that forgetting, Votarius will be actually stabbed and Bellarius will have his revenge. Further, he tells Leonella to poison the weapon so that there's no hope of Votarius escaping.
- The Tyrant is wound up over the news of Sophonirus's and the Lady's deaths. He tells Memphonius to order the execution of the messenger. He blames himself for the Lady's death and then orders Govianus's release. He asks for keys to the cathedral and a pickaxe so he can break open the Lady's tomb and hold her.
- The soldiers refuse to help the Tyrant open the tomb, so he takes the tools and does it himself. He then orders them to move the body out of the tomb. The Tyrant kisses the body and then meditates on her coldness and how he will possess her now in spite of everything. He orders the soldiers to carry her body to the palace where he can have it embalmed and preserved and shower it with riches.
- Govianus goes to visit the tomb. As he speaks to the body within, a voice says "I am not within". He questions it, and then in a flash of light, the tomb bursts open to reveal the ghost of the Lady, all in white, with a crucifix and jewels. Her spirit tells him her body has been taken by the Tyrant and her rest disturbed, and Govianus vows to set it right as she vanishes.

ACT FIVE

- Votarius hides Anselmus in a closet. Leonella and Wife stage a conversation for Anselmus's benefit about how Wife will kill herself if Votarius won't leave her alone. Votarius enters and Wife puts him off, then stabs him with the poisoned sword. He dies, and Anselmus leaps from the closet. Accusing Leonella of slandering her mistress, he stabs her. Bellarius enters and challenges Anselmus. Wife gets between them on purpose, and they both kill her by "running through the swords of Anselmus and Belarius to her death". They continue fighting and both wound each other. Anselmus dies first. Govianus arrives and Bellarius explains what has happened, and then dies. Anselmus revives, having heard the tale of his wife's wantonness, and curses his wife. He crawls away from her body and then dies for real.
- The Tyrant's servants bring in the body of the Lady in a chair, dressed all in black and covered in a pearl chain with a crucifix. Music plays while he makes obeisance to her. Govianus arrives in the guise of a painter hired to make the Lady's portrait. The Tyrant instructs him to paint her face so that she looks alive, and Govianus does so begrudgingly. Tyrant takes up the body and kisses it, and then feels ill, at which point Govianus throws off his disguise and says the paint is poisoned. The Lady's ghost appears, terrifying the Tyrant and comforting Govianus. She thanks Govianus for his actions and departs, apparently at rest. The other nobles arrive and Tyrant tells them to arrest Govianus, but they pledge their allegiance to him instead. The Tyrant dies. Govianus directs them to crown the Lady's body as his queen before returning her to her tomb, and the court files out.
