= Ernest Hall (businessman) =

English businessman and musician (1930–2024)

Sir Ernest Hall OBE
- Born: 19 March 1930; Bolton, Lancashire, England
- Died: 3 August 2024 (aged 94)
- Occupations: Businessman and musician
- Known for: Restoration of Dean Clough Mills
- Children: 5

Sir Ernest Hall OBE (19 March 1930 – 3 August 2024) was an English businessman, known for his restoration of Dean Clough Mills in Halifax. He was also a pianist and composer.

== Early life and education ==
Hall was born in Bolton, Lancashire on 19 March 1930. He was educated at Bolton College Grammar School and the Royal Manchester College of Music. This was followed by two years of National Service.

== Career ==
Hall made his first fortune in textiles. He then sold property through the Mountleigh Group. In 1983, Hall sold his company for £40 million. He led a consortium, in which he invested £20 million, that purchased a disused carpet mill complex, Dean Clough Mills, and converted it into an arts, business, design and education complex.

He was appointed an Officer of the Order of the British Empire (OBE) in the 1986 Birthday Honours and knighted in the 1993 Birthday Honours for services to Training and Enterprise.

== Music ==
Hall studied at the Royal Manchester College of Music between 1947 and 1951, performing Chopin's 12 Etudes Op 10 at the age of 19. His fellow students there included Martin Milner and later John Ogdon. It was Ogdon's superior virtuosity that discouraged Hall from becoming a professional musician. When he was 65 he recorded the three piano concertos of Bela Bartok with the Sinfonia of Leeds, following this with the complete piano works of Chopin (from aged 70). He gave a public performance of Busoni's Piano Concerto in March 2003 with the Sheffield Symphony Orchestra. Hall composed two piano sonatas.

He appeared as a castaway on the BBC Radio 4 programme Desert Island Discs on 26 April 1998, choosing Schubert's "Piano Trio in B Major", the collected works of William Blake, and a piano as his favourite record, book and luxury item respectively, and appeared on the Radio 3 programme Private Passions on 18 September 2005.

== Personal life ==
Hall had homes in Lanzarote and in France.

In 1951, Hall married firstly June Annable (died 1994), and had two sons and two daughters. He married secondly in 1975 Sarah Wellby, with whom he has a third son.

In 2009, he revealed that he was in a romantic relationship with his long-time friend, the cookery writer Prue Leith.

Hall died at home on 3 August 2024, at the age of 94.

== Autobiography ==
His autobiography, How to Be A Failure and Succeed, was published in 2008.

== Bibliography ==
- —— (2008). How to Be A Failure and Succeed. Book Guild Publishing. ISBN 978-1846241635.
