= Barrie Rutter =

English theatre director and actor (born 1946)

Barrie Rutter OBE
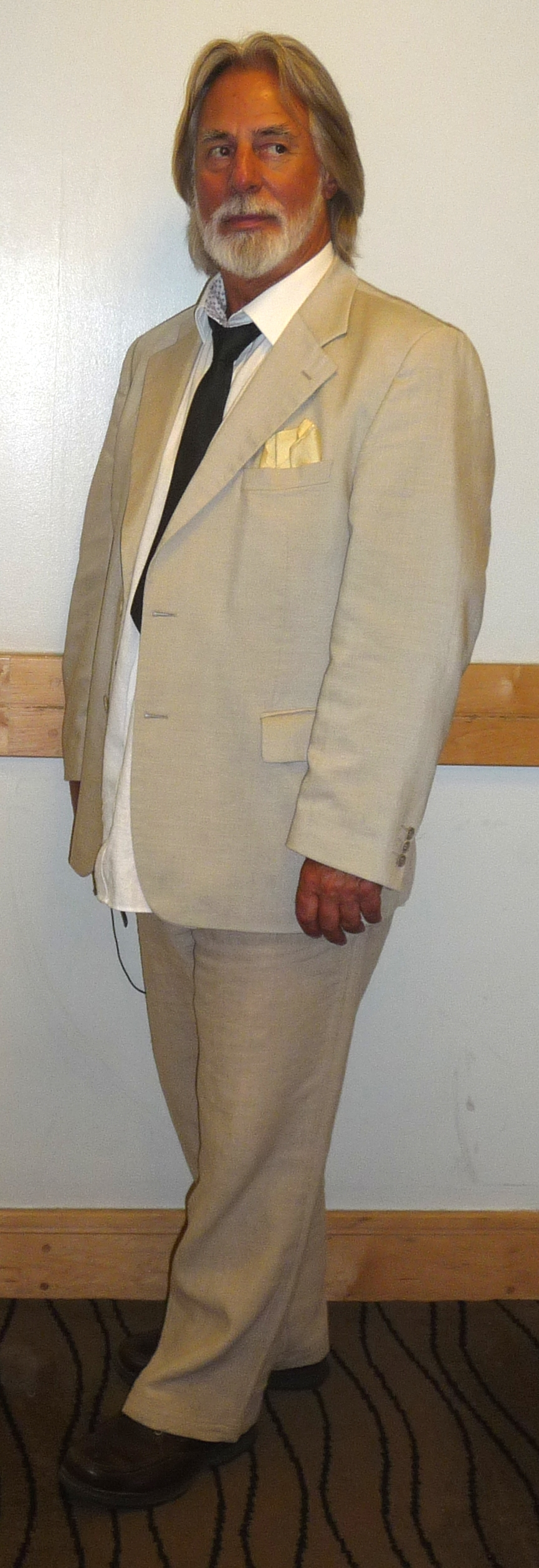
- Rutter in 2015
- Born: 12 December 1946 (age 79); Hull, East Riding of Yorkshire, England
- Occupations: Actor, theatre company director
- Years active: 1969–present

Barrie Thomas Rutter OBE (born 12 December 1946) is an English actor and the founder and former artistic director of the Northern Broadsides theatre company based in Dean Clough complex, Halifax, West Yorkshire, England.

== Biography ==
Rutter was born and brought up in Hull, East Riding of Yorkshire, England, attending Newton Hall, part of Greatfield High School.

He participated in school plays, joining the National Youth Theatre and at the age of 17 in 1964, he left Hull to live with his aunt in Kennington, London. He later studied at the Royal Scottish Academy of Music and Drama, but left early before finishing the course to go on a European tour with the NYT.

Rutter was passed over for the 1967 production of Peter Terson's football play Zigger Zagger, but Terson wrote a role for him in The Apprentices. He was with the Nottingham Playhouse in 1968, then freelanced until joining the Royal Shakespeare Company in 1975.

In the 1980s he performed in three adaptations by the poet Tony Harrison.

Rutter founded Northern Broadsides in 1992 and the company performs at its Halifax base and on tour. Rutter has played major parts in many of its productions.

He has appeared in many films and television programmes, including Countdown to War, Queenie's Castle, Minder ("The Beer Hunter"), and a regular role in the early 1980s ITV sitcom Astronauts and as armed robber Oakes in the 1979 film version of the BBC sitcom Porridge. He appeared in The Bill "Suspects" in 1992. He appeared in 5 episodes of the television series Fat Friends in 2004–05, playing Douglas Simpson.

In 2009 Rutter directed Lenny Henry in a production of Othello. He said of the decision to cast the comedian, "knives might be out at me or at Lenny. I don't care. This has come about from a completely genuine desire to do a piece of theatrical work. Bloody hell, how long has the Donmar had Hollywood stars going there for £200? He's six-foot five. He's beautifully black. And he's Othello."

After setting up the run of Othello in London, Rutter was invited to direct Richard III for the 'Vanemuine' Theatre Company in Tartu, Estonia. Though he suffered a heart attack, he completed the rehearsals for the first night at the Samadateater in Tartu on 17 October 2009. In the third quarter of 2010, Rutter also became a patron for the newly opened ALRA North.

In June 2016 Rutter was the subject of BBC Radio 4's Desert Island Discs. His eight musical choices were works by Frank Sinatra, Kay Starr, Elvis Presley, The Rolling Stones, César Franck, Eliza Carthy with Norma Waterson, Tina Turner and The Band. Tina Turner's Proud Mary was his track to "rescue from the waves". He declined to take The Bible but accepted the complete works of Shakespeare; his chosen book was a collection of Tony Harrison's poems and his luxury a pair of swimming flippers so that "at the first sign of madness" he could swim out to sea and battle with a shark. In the programme he discussed his childhood and family and professional life, including the loss of a son by cot death at 14 weeks.

In July 2017 Rutter announced that he would step down from the post of artistic director at Northern Broadsides in April 2018 after frustration at what he saw as inadequate Arts Council funding for the company.

His final production with the company was The Captive Queen, an adaptation of John Dryden's Aureng-zebe, at the Sam Wanamaker Playhouse in February and March 2018; as well as directing, he played the part of the emperor.

In April 2023 he performed a one-man one-night show titled Shakespeare's Royals in Halifax. He toured the same show in 2024 to venues including The Dukes in Lancaster, Stephen Joseph Theatre in Scarborough, and the Georgian Theatre Royal in Richmond, North Yorkshire. In October 2024 he had a role in long-running radio series The Archers.

== Personal life ==
He married American Carol Chillington in 1978, and moved near to Stratford-on-Avon when Chillington got a job at Warwick University. They have two daughters, and were divorced before 2009. Carol Chillington Rutter is Professor of Shakespeare and Performance Studies at Warwick and was director of the CAPITAL Centre from 2006 to 2011.

In January 2020 The Yorkshire Post said that Rutter had been diagnosed with throat cancer. By October 2020 he reported "Well, they don't call it the 'all-clear', they call it fully tested, but yes, I am back to normal" and was planning a performance of An Evening with Barrie Rutter at The Holbeck in Leeds.

== Awards and honours ==
In 2000 he won the title 'Creative Briton 2000', with a cheque for £100,000. He was nominated for it by, amongst others, John Prescott, then Deputy Prime Minister, who said "Barrie's northern accent, fast action, factory floor Shakespeare is as far from elitism as can be, though it has never, never dumbed Shakespeare down." In 2003 he received the Sam Wanamaker Award jointly with Stephen Unwin for their work promoting Shakespeare in the regions. In 2005 he received the honorary degree of Doctor of Letters from the University of Bradford, and in 2018 the same degree from Lancaster University.

Rutter was appointed Officer of the Order of the British Empire (OBE) in the 2015 New Year Honours for services to drama.
