= Salts Mill =

Former textile mill in Saltaire, England

Coordinates: 53.8388°N 1.7879°W

Salts Mill

View from the canal

An exhibition inside the former mill

Salts Mill (sometimes spelled Salt's Mill) is a former textile mill, now incorporating an art gallery, shops, restaurant, and spaces to rent in Saltaire, Bradford, West Yorkshire, England. It was commissioned and financed by Sir Titus Salt and opened in 1853. The construction involved multiple firms, including J and W Beanland, a respected Bradford building company known for their skilled craftsmanship. At that point, the mill was the largest industrial building in the world by total floor area. The present-day 1853 Gallery takes its name from that date. The mill has many paintings by local artist David Hockney on display.

The Mill and surrounding village of Saltaire was financed and built by the 19th century industrialist and philanthropist Sir Titus Salt after he observed other textile factories and was disappointed by the working conditions he saw there. At the time mill working conditions were commonly poor, with most workers suffering disease, low wages and labour exploitation. Dangerous machinery and long hours, sometimes exceeding 16 hour working days, resulted in frequent accidents. Titus Salt acknowledged this and built a factory and surrounding village with which he intended to improve the working conditions for his employees. It is a grade II* listed building. The mill closed in 1986 and the following year it was sold to Jonathan Silver, who began a long renovation scheme.

== Spelling ==
The spellings Salts Mill and Salt's Mill (that is, with and without an apostrophe) are both commonly used. The former is used consistently by the Salts Mill website, the Saltaire Village website, and Visit Bradford from the official Bradford Tourist Information service. Both versions are used in the UNESCO World Heritage documentation.

== Peace Museum ==
Bradford's Peace Museum moved to the third floor of the mill in August 2024. The move was paid for by the Bradford 2025 City of Culture fund and the national lottery.

== See also ==
- Grade II* listed buildings in Bradford
- Listed buildings in Saltaire
- Bliss Tweed Mill
- Lister Mills
- The Trackers of Oxyrhynchus
