= Northern Broadsides =

Northern Broadsides is a theatre company formed in 1992 and based at Dean Clough Mill in Halifax, West Yorkshire, England. It was founded by Barrie Rutter, who was its artistic director until resigning in 2018, followed by Conrad Nelson who was interim for one year and then Laurie Sansom. The company performs in Halifax and on tour, a mix of Shakespeare, new writing and classic works all performed in a characteristic Northern Voice. Barrie Rutter described the company's style as "Northern voices, doing classical work in non-velvet spaces".

In 2012 the ‘Northern Broadsides – 20 years' exhibition opened, celebrating the work of the company through the production photography of Nobby Clark who has worked with Northern Broadsides since its beginnings in 1992. The exhibition ran in Dean Clough's Crossley gallery from 26 May till 16 September.

In July 2017 Rutter announced that he would step down from the post of artistic director in April 2018 after frustration at what he saw as inadequate Arts Council funding for the company. His final production with the company was The Captive Queen, an adaptation of John Dryden's Aureng-zebe, at the Sam Wanamaker Playhouse in February and March 2018; as well as directing, he played the part of the emperor.

Conrad Nelson resigned as artistic director with effect from 31 March 2019, to be replaced by Laurie Sansom. Kay Packwood then became the new executive director.

The company's 2020 tour of J. M. Barrie's Quality Street was cut short by the COVID-19 pandemic after performances at four venues including The Viaduct, Halifax, and The Lowry, Salford.. In 2022, Northern Broadsides' 30th anniversary production was a tour of As You Like It by William Shakespeare with 12 actors. Quality Street toured again, with a new cast, in 2023.

In Spring 2026, the company toured a small-scale studio production of Crime and Punishment by Dostoevsky, performed by just 3 actors.
