= Dean Clough =

Repurposed factory buildings in Halifax, England

Coordinates: 53.728°N 1.862°W

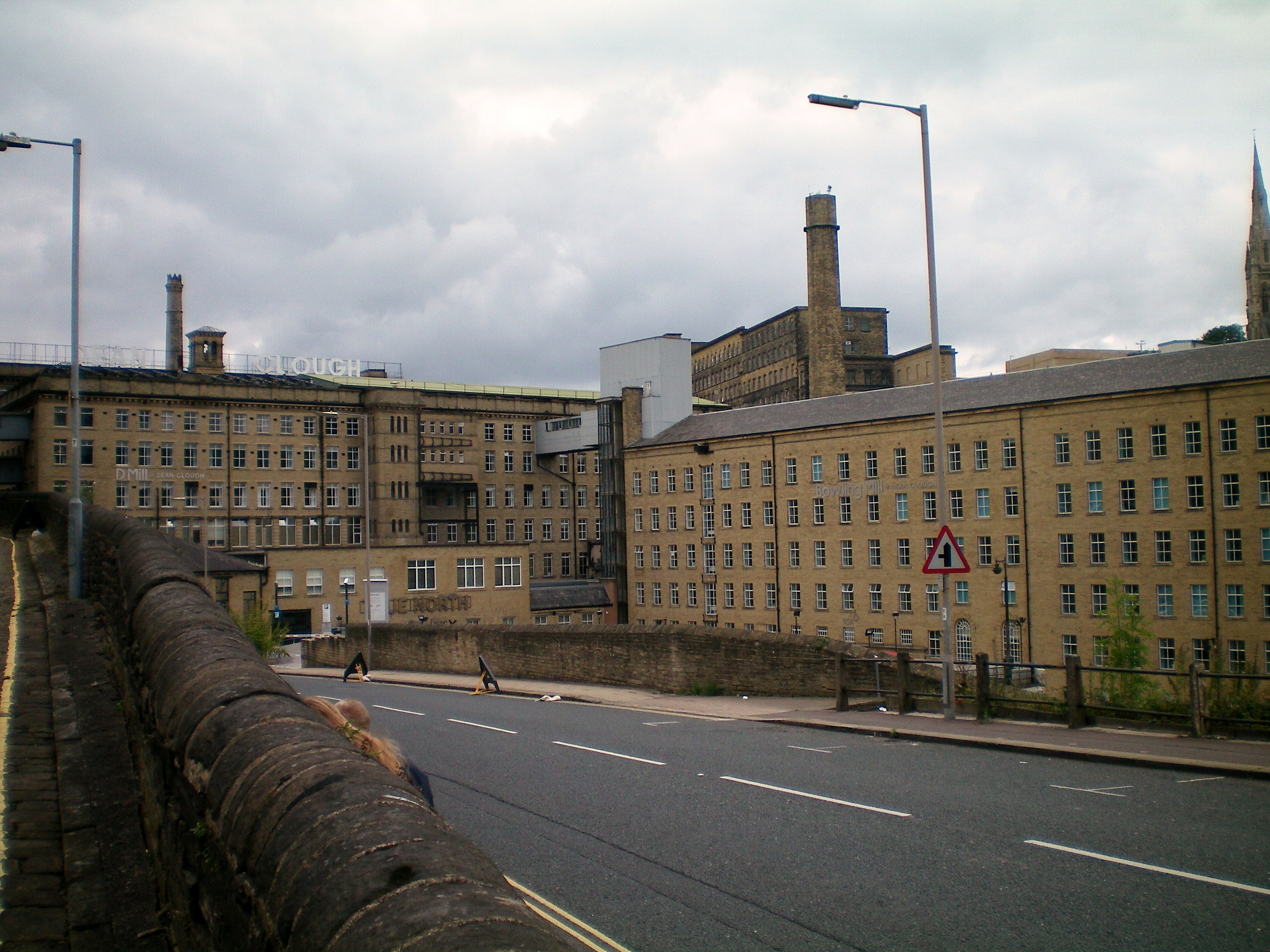
Dean Clough

Dean Clough in Halifax, Calderdale, West Yorkshire, England, is a group of large factory buildings built in the 1840s–60s for Crossley's Carpets, becoming one of the world's largest carpet factories (half a mile long with 1,250,000 square feet (116,000 m^{2}) of floorspace). After years of declining production it closed in 1983, when it was bought by a consortium led by Sir Ernest Hall which developed the Grade II listed site for various commercial and cultural uses. It is now seen as a leading example of successful urban regeneration. Dean Clough is located on the north side of Halifax near the Victorian North Bridge and the modern flyover sections of the Burdock Way relief road system. The converted mills now house about 150 large and small businesses and arts venues including Crossley Gallery and several other art galleries and the Viaduct Theatre, home base for the Northern Broadsides theatre company. Phoenix Radio 96.7 FM has its studios in E Mill and Prestige Flowers has offices in G Mill.

== History ==
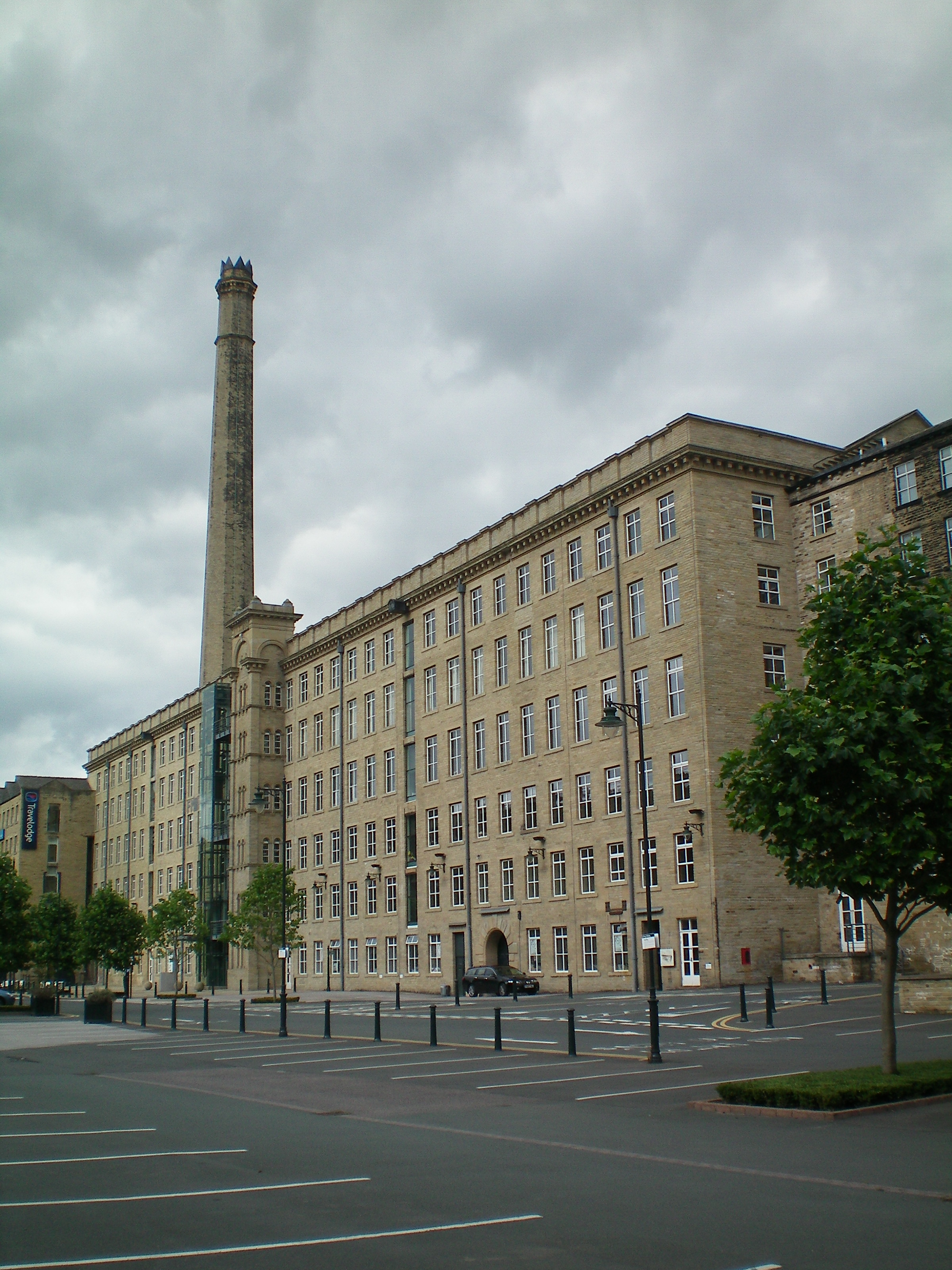

John Crossley, with his brother, Thomas, and James Travis first leased Dean Clough Mills in 1802. When this lease expired after twenty years John Crossley took on a new lease in his own name. After his death in 1837, at which time three hundred people were employed, his three sons, John, Joseph and Francis, continued the business as John Crossley and Sons. They formed a joint stock company in 1864, becoming one of the first limited liability companies in Britain. It was this company that built the very large mills on the site between 1841 and 1869, together with large sheds which have now been demolished. Around 1855 the alphabetical naming system was introduced for the mills. There were also other premises in Halifax, employing five thousand people by 1900. The company also operated at Kidderminster and had warehouses in London and Manchester. During the two world wars production changed from carpets to military supplies such as webbing, blankets and khaki yarn for uniforms. When Chairman Patrick Crossley retired in 1970 the company moved its headquarters to Kidderminster, and it was decided in 1982 to close the Dean Clough site. One of the Crossley family is still involved in carpet making on a much smaller scale at neighbouring Haley Hill.

Following the closure of the mills in 1983 the site was bought by a consortium led by chairman Sir Ernest Hall. As managing director, his son Jeremy, has gradually refurbished the buildings for office and cultural uses by a large number of companies.

Dean Clough played host to the launch of the Conservative Party manifesto for the 2017 General Election by then Prime Minister Theresa May, the site being situated in the Labour constituency of Halifax.

== Site ==
=== Mill buildings ===
There are a number of mill buildings, some very large, mostly named with letters of the alphabet. Most of them are in the bottom of the steep sided Hebble Valley but G Mill stands on the steep bank to the south of Dean Clough Road, reducing from nine storeys at the road to five at the top of the bank. The first mill built on the site by the Crossley family in 1841 was A mill, followed by six storey B Mill in 1844. They are likely to have originally contained spinning and some weaving equipment. The first weaving shed, Old Shed, was built in 1849. These were followed by C Mill in 1850, New Shed in 1853, E Mill in 1857, F Mill in 1858, G Mill in 1867, and H Mill in 1869. Other smaller buildings were also built on the site.

=== Transport infrastructure ===
The factory had railway sidings at North Bridge railway station close to the eastern end of the factory. This was connected by a viaduct to the Caldervale Line at the main Halifax railway station, and entered Old Lane Tunnel alongside the mills, to connect via the Queensbury Lines to Bradford and Keighley. Following the closure of that railway in 1955 and the demolition of North Bridge Station in 1960 Dean Clough relies on road transport on the A58, A629, A6036 and A646 roads. These roads are linked by the Burdock Way road system which was carved through Halifax in the early 1970s with high curving flyovers overlooking the mills.

== Redevelopment ==
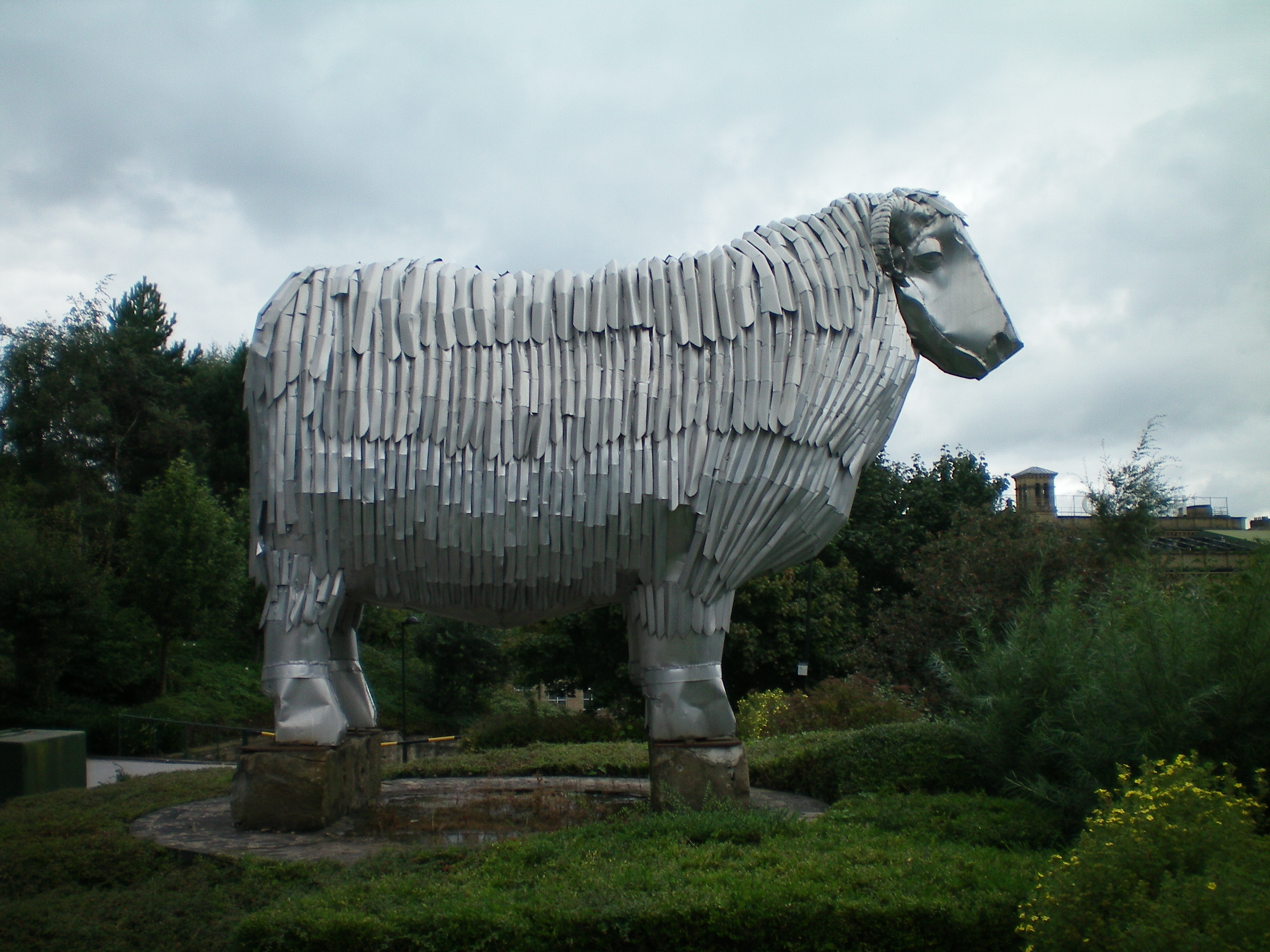
An aluminium sheep by artist Frank Darnley overlooks the mills, next to a similar sculpture representing a phoenix bird

Sir Ernest Hall and Jonathan Silver bought the site in equal shares in 1983 and opted to develop flexibly rather than to enmesh themselves in grant aided regeneration schemes; but the two men had very different styles of working and the partnership did not last. Within a year, Hall bought Silver's share from him, and Silver left; three years later he bought Salt's Mill and began regenerating that building in his own way.

The large sheds on the south western part of the site were demolished to open it up and provide car parking space. A Travelodge and an NHS facility now use buildings at the western end. The refurbishment of G Mill has been ongoing over twenty years, working floor by floor. Stone facades have been cleaned of the industrial blackening which affected all of the area's older buildings and exterior changes have been kept to a minimum, while interiors have been adapted to new uses. This has sometimes involved removing floors and cast iron pillars and installing lifts.

The mills now provide office space for some 150 companies, art galleries, restaurants and The Viaduct Theatre. A 35 feet (11 m) long model of the factory at 1:40 scale has been made out of Lego and is on display.

=== The Viaduct Theatre ===
The Viaduct Theatre is a 300-seater underground performance space. It has been the home base for the Northern Broadsides theatre company for more than 30 years, and also hosts visiting companies and community groups.

== See also ==
- Listed buildings in Halifax, West Yorkshire
