= 1869 Bradford by-election =

UK parliamentary by-election

The 1869 Bradford by-election was fought on 12 March 1869. The by-election was held due to the previously voided election of the incumbent Liberal MP, Henry William Ripley. In an all Liberal contest, it was won by the Liberal candidate Edward Miall.

Bradford by-election, 1869
Party	Candidate	Votes	%	±%
Liberal	Edward Miall	9,243	54.2	+22.6
Liberal	Matthew William Thompson	7,806	45.8	N/A
Majority		1,437	8.4	+6.3
Turnout		17,049	79.2	+14.7
Liberal hold		Swing		
