= John Hardy (MP for Bradford) =

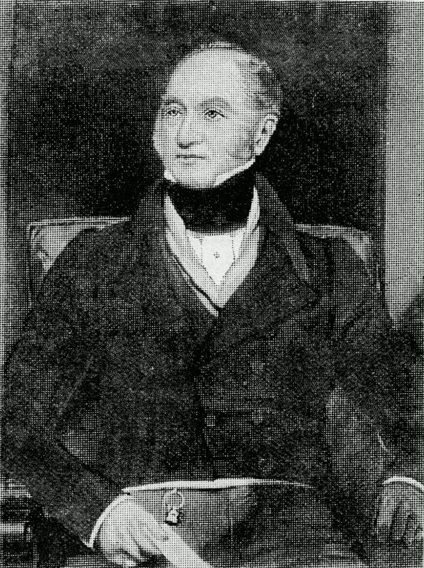
Engraving of John Hardy, after a portrait by Henry William Pickersgill

John Hardy (1773 – 29 September 1855) was an English barrister, ironmaster, and politician. He was a principal proprietor of the Low Moor ironworks, one of the largest ironworks in Yorkshire during the early nineteenth century, and represented Bradford in the House of Commons from 1832 to 1837 and from 1841 to 1847.

Originally trained as a lawyer, Hardy combined a legal career with industrial investment and public life. In Parliament he was active on questions of factory reform, the abolition of slavery, and electoral corruption, and took a constitutional position in favour of maintaining the Union with Ireland. Although he had earlier supported Catholic emancipation, he later opposed Daniel O'Connell on constitutional and parliamentary matters.

== Early life and education ==
His father, also named John (1745–1806), was an attorney at Horsforth and land steward to the Spencer-Stanhope family. He was among the original partners in the Low Moor ironworks, in which he made successful investments. Earlier generations of the family had also served as stewards and clerks to the Stanhope family of Horsforth.

Hardy was educated in Switzerland near Bienne. On his return to England, he studied for the Bar and became a pupil of the special pleader William Tidd. Fellow pupils included Lord Lyndhurst and Daniel O'Connell.

Although Hardy and O'Connell later differed politically, a memoir by Hardy's son records that O’Connell recalled their time together as pupils of Tidd.

Hardy resided at Old Manor Hall, Bradford, and later at Dunstall Hall.

== Career ==
Hardy was called to the Bar by the Middle Temple on 7 June 1799 and practised as a special pleader. He later served as Recorder of Leeds and was active on the Northern Circuit and at the West Riding Sessions.

He succeeded to his father's share in the Low Moor ironworks, one of the largest and most important ironworks in Yorkshire. Established in 1791 by a partnership including his father, John Hardy (1745–1806), the works were developed to exploit local deposits of high-quality ironstone and low-sulphur coal.

During the early nineteenth century Low Moor grew into a major industrial complex, producing both pig and wrought iron for domestic and international markets, including components for steam engines, structural ironwork, and munitions during the Napoleonic Wars. The enterprise remained in the hands of the founding families and expanded substantially in capital and output.

Through his share in the partnership Hardy became a man of considerable wealth, which underpinned his later political and philanthropic activities, while he remained connected to the management and development of the works during its period of expansion.

Following the Reform Act 1832, Hardy was elected Member of Parliament for Bradford, serving from 1832 to 1837. He was returned again in 1841 and sat until 1847.

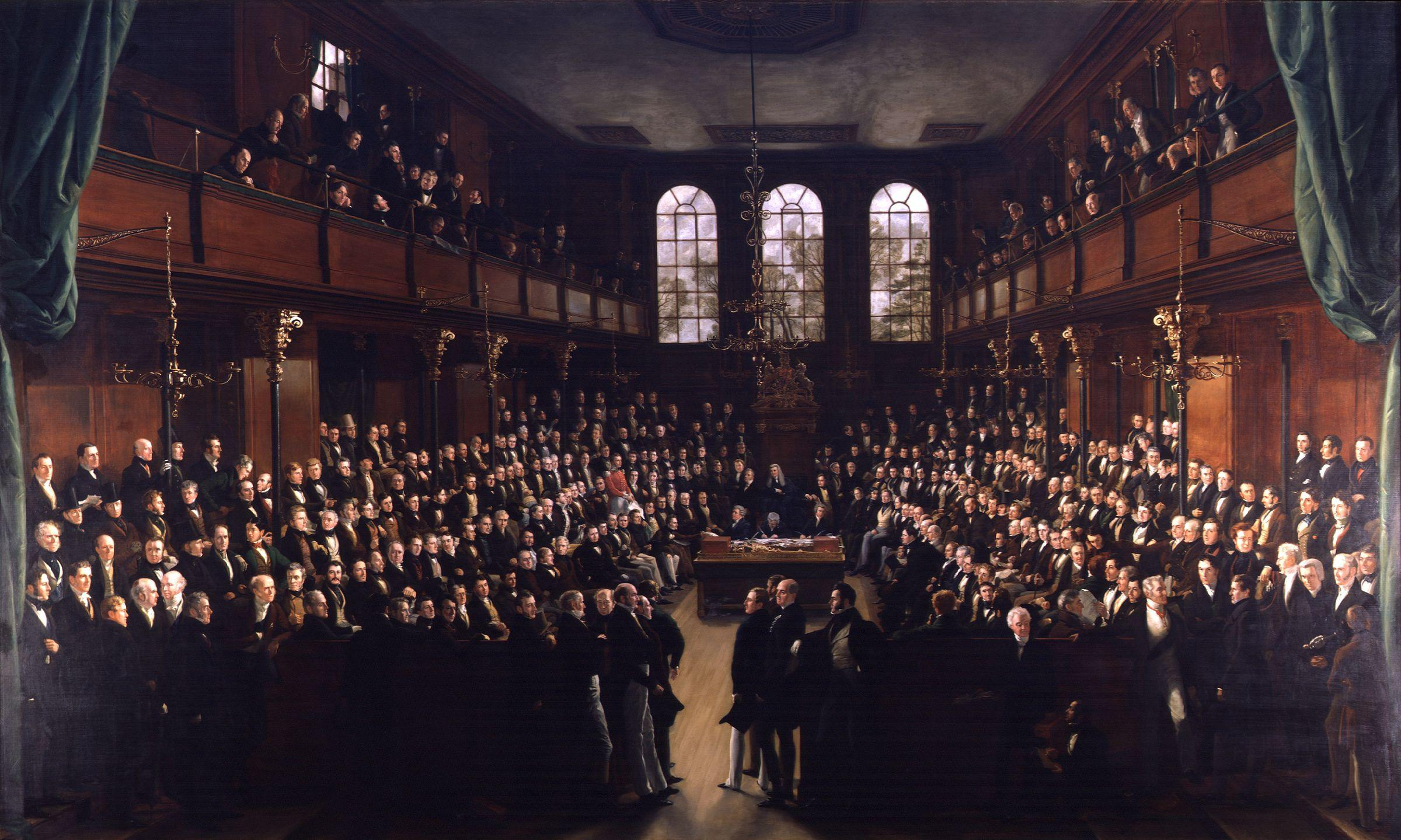
The House of Commons, 1833 by Sir George Hayter, painted 1833–1843. Hardy is among the Members depicted on the opposition benches on the right.

Hardy was one of the Members of Parliament included in Sir George Hayter's group portrait The House of Commons, 1833, a large-scale representation of the reformed House following the Reform Act 1832, now in the collection of the National Portrait Gallery, London.

In Parliament, Hardy took part in debates on factory reform. In February 1833 he presented a petition from Bradford, signed by 12,000 inhabitants, calling for the regulation and reduction of child labour in factories.

He was associated with the evangelical reformer William Wilberforce, who described him as one of his strongest supporters in Yorkshire. Hardy spoke in debates on the abolition of slavery and in July 1833 argued against prolonging the transition from slavery through apprenticeships, questioning entirely the justice of requiring freed people to compensate their former owners in this way.

Hardy had early in his career supported Catholic emancipation, a position associated with his defeat at Pontefract in 1826.

On constitutional matters, however, he opposed proposals for the repeal of the Union between Great Britain and Ireland. In a debate in 1834 he expressed scepticism about claims that repeal would resolve economic difficulties, arguing that many supporters misunderstood its effects and that the interests of England, Ireland, and Scotland should be treated as shared within a single political framework.

He was also active in efforts to address electoral corruption. In March 1834 he moved for leave to bring in a bill to consolidate and amend the laws relating to bribery and election practices.

Although Hardy had trained alongside Daniel O'Connell under William Tidd, the two later found themselves on opposing sides in Parliament. In 1836 Hardy brought forward proceedings concerning the Carlow election and O'Connell's role in arrangements connected with the return of Alexander Raphael. During these proceedings Hardy rejected allegations that he had himself been involved in bribery, describing them as unfounded.

== Personal life ==
In 1804 Hardy married Isabel, daughter and heiress of Richard Gathorne of Kirkby Lonsdale. They had twelve children, comprising three sons and nine daughters.

Their eldest son John served as a Conservative MP for the constituencies of Midhurst, Dartmouth and South Warwickshire and was created a Baronet in 1876; their second son Charles became managing partner of the Low Moor ironworks; and their third son Gathorne became a prominent Conservative politician and was created Earl of Cranbrook in 1892.

Hardy died at Dunstall Hall, Staffordshire, on 29 September 1855.

== See also ==
- Hardy Baronets, of Dunstall Hall
- Earl of Cranbrook

Parliament of the United Kingdom
New constituency	Member of Parliament for Bradford; 1832 – 1837; With: Ellis Cunliffe Lister	Succeeded by Ellis Cunliffe Lister; William Busfield
Preceded by Ellis Cunliffe Lister; William Busfield	Member of Parliament for Bradford; 1841 – 1847; With: William Cunliffe Lister 1841; William Busfield 1841–1847	Succeeded by William Busfield; Thomas Perronet Thompson
