= Robert Milligan (politician) =

British politician (1786–1862)

- Born: 10 October 1786; Dunnance, Balmaghie, Kirkcudbrightshire, Scotland
- Died: 1 July 1862 (aged 75); Acacia, Rawdon
- Occupations: Member of Parliament for Bradford, 1851–1857
- Spouse: Phoebe Briggs
- Parent(s): John Milligan and Elizabeth Charters

Robert Milligan (10 October 1786 – 1 July 1862) was a Liberal Party politician and the first mayor of Bradford.

He was elected unopposed as Member of Parliament (MP) for Bradford in West Yorkshire at a by-election in October 1851, and held the seat until the 1857 general election.

== Biography ==
Robert Milligan was born at Dunnance, Balmaghie, Kirkcudbrightshire, Scotland on 10 October 1786 to John Milligan (1740–1819). John Milligan was a tenant farmer who married his second wife Elizabeth Charters(1739–1831) in 1783. The couple had five children of which Robert was the second child.

Robert Milligan moved to Cross Hills in Craven in about 1802 as a "Travelling Scotchman" working as a door to door salesman. He married Phoebe Briggs (1796–1868) at Guiseley in 1818. They had no children but adopted Susan (1813–1886), the daughter of Robert's brother, John jnr. By 1810 he had opened a drapers shop in Westgate, Bradford eventually becoming a buyer for Leo Schuster & Co. of Manchester and through that job met Henry Forbes (1790–1870). Together they formed Milligan, Forbes & Co, Stuff Merchants that became synonymous with the stuff trade of Bradford and housed in an impressive new premises on Hall Ings, Bradford in 1853. The Milligan and Forbes Warehouse, now considered Bradford's first palazzo, has been the headquarters of the Telegraph and Argus since the 1920s.

By 1847, Robert Milligan's esteem had risen enough for him to become the town's first mayor and chairman of the new borough magistrates. He was later Liberal MP for the borough in three successive Parliaments from 1851–1857. Of a strongly liberal position, Milligan was sympathetic to the Chartists who were active in Bradford during his tenure as M.P. and held strong views on parliamentary reform. In 1833 he was one of the Bradford Anti-Slavery Society’s delegates to the Exeter Hall assembly which called for immediate and outright emancipation of slaves in the British colonies, and in 1835 he presided at a meeting to celebrate Benjamin Godwin’s abolitionist work.

== Death ==
Milligan died at his Acacia estate in Rawdon on 1 July 1862. He is buried under an impressive 20 feet (6.1 m) pillar in Undercliffe Cemetery, whose very existence is at least partly due to Milligan as a member of The Bradford Cemetery Company. The flattering inscription reads:

"In memory of Robert Milligan of Acacia Road, Rawdon. Born in Scotland he became a resident in Bradford in 1808. His talents and industry guided by integrity and honour raised him to high distinction as a merchant. He was the first Mayor of Bradford in 1847. He represented the town in two successive parliaments with fidelity and distinction. He was generous and warm hearted in his hospitalities, liberal in his support of religious and other benevolent institutions. He departed this life in faith and hope of the gospel July 1, 1862 aged 75."

Parliament of the United Kingdom
Preceded by Thomas Perronet Thompson and William Busfield	Member of Parliament for Bradford; 1851 – 1857; With: Thomas Perronet Thompson 1851–1852; Henry Wickham Wickham 1852–1857	Succeeded by Henry Wickham Wickham and Thomas Perronet Thompson
