= Liberation Society =

Organisation promoting separation of church and state in England

The Liberation Society was an organisation in Victorian England that campaigned for disestablishment of the Church of England. It was founded in 1844 by Edward Miall as the British Anti-State Church Association and was renamed in 1853 as the Society for the Liberation of Religion from State Patronage and Control, from which the shortened common name of Liberation Society derived.

== Background ==
Nonconformism – which included Baptists, Congregationalists, Unitarians, Wesleyans and other branches of Methodism – was a significant religious movement in mid-nineteenth century Britain. The UK census of 1851 reported that just under half the church-going population, which itself was around half of the total population, were Nonconformists. While no religious movement was able to grow its audience in proportion to the increase in population over the remainder of the century, it seems that the Nonconformists were more actively observant than their Church of England counterparts towards its end. Generally, those who followed the various Nonconformist sects tended to be supporters of the Liberal Party rather than its main opposition, the Conservatives. This cohesion, which increased with the left-ward movement of the Wesleyans as the century progressed, meant that they could play a major role in determining political outcomes, both as an influential block of opinion within the Liberal Party and more generally in the country as a whole.

The Nonconformist belief in freedom of conscience for individuals meant that they thought there should be no connection between the state and church because that would imply a corporate conscience. Among the theoretical objections to a church-state relationship was the possibility of conflicted loyalties in situations where the desire of the state differed from the conviction of the religion, potentially leading to extreme cases such as martyrdom. More specifically, while repeal of measures such as the Test Acts had done much to give Nonconformists freedom of worship they still felt the weight of what they considered to be inappropriate and discriminatory practices. These practices included compulsory local levies known as church rates that were imposed on people, regardless of their religious belief, for use by the Established Church of England for maintenance and running of their parish churches. Failure to pay, which happened as a form of protest, could lead to seizure of property and imprisonment.

The state attempted to address concerns by, for example, introducing civil marriage and public burial grounds that included areas that were not consecrated by the Established Church. Even so, and even as part of these measures, new slights and sectarian complications emerged. It was against this background of holding an influential position yet perceiving discrimination that Nonconformist protest in forms such as the Liberation Society took shape. (Note: Other groups that were formed to pursue the aim of disestablishment included the Evangelical Voluntary Church Association and the Religious Freedom Society, both established in 1839.)

== Formation ==
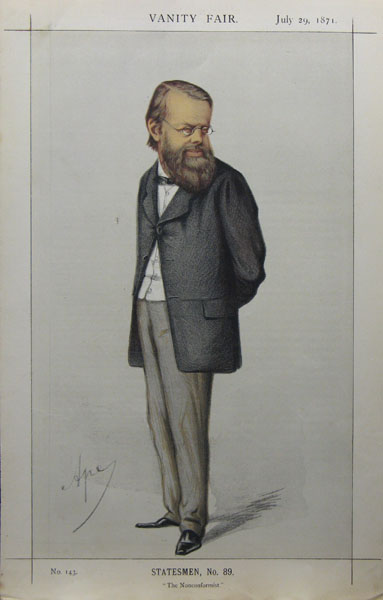
Edward Miall as caricatured by Ape (Carlo Pellegrini) in Vanity Fair, July 1871.

Edward Miall was a pastor at the Congregational chapel in Leicester who had been inspired by those who had been campaigning against church rates. The imprisonment in 1840 of one of his congregation for non-payment of church rates caused him to leave his ministry to become editor of the new Nonconformist weekly newspaper in 1841. With the additional impetus of controversy regarding discrimination in James Graham's 1843 proposals for changes to education provisions in the Factory Acts and the schism in the Church of Scotland, Miall formed the British Anti-State Church Association in 1844. The group was renamed in 1853 as the Liberation Society on the advice of the relatively moderate veteran campaigner, Edward Baines. The Liberation Society, says historian Richard Helmstadter, became "the most important political organisation of the Nonconformist community" almost from its foundation and until the death of Miall in 1881.

The Society campaigned on issues including church rates and discrimination both in cemeteries and the established universities, such as Cambridge and Oxford. At its heart, however, was a drive for disestablishment rather than mere removal of discriminatory practices. Miall's efforts relied heavily on political means to achieve religious ends, one outcome of which was that he was elected as a Member of Parliament for Rochdale in the 1852 general election, having first tried for election in 1845. (Note: Miall represented Rochdale in Parliament between 1852-57; he entered parliament again in 1869, when he was elected for Bradford in a by-election, and left it at the 1874 general election.)

The net of the Liberation Society spread wider, though. It encompassed disaffected groups such as the Chartists and Free Traders as well as militant Nonconformists. It was a temporary recourse even for some members of the Established Church, notably the High Church cleric Alexander Mackonochie, who wanted less interference from the state so that he could practice proscribed rituals. Some people, such as Richard Masheder, a Fellow of Magdalene College, Cambridge, noted that the movement had the potential to effect change well beyond religious affairs because of the symbiotic relationship between the Established Church and the upper levels of society, whereby each buttressed the position of the other. Disestablishment might remove the prop that legitimised the role of the aristocracy and indeed the monarchy itself. There was indeed a wave of support for a more democratic society at that time and Miall repeatedly attacked the mutuality of the relationship between church and the social elite, believing it to be a force for snobbery and a barrier to progress. He said

The upper ten thousand with very few exceptions regard connection with the authorised ecclesiastical institution of the kingdom as inseparable from their elevated position ... To belong to the church is to side with respectability; to dissent from it is to cast in your lot with the vulgar. Accordingly, Dissenters, simply as such, are esteemed inferior.

== Outcomes ==
Miall and his fellow Nonconformist Members of Parliament (MP) were not particularly effective in that venue. Miles Taylor says of those elected in 1852 - who included James Bell, William Biggs, Lawrence Heyworth and Apsley Pellatt - that they "were either almost completely silent, or became tongue-tied in the House of Commons when it came to taking the lead in church reform". Anglican spokesmen for the Liberation Society in Parliament included the Radicals William Clay, Thomas Duncombe, John Roebuck and John Trelawny. Their efforts were more evident and included Clay's 1854 attempt to introduce legislation to abolish church rates.

In the 1860s the Society concentrated much of its efforts in Wales, playing a leading role in several constituencies at the 1865 and 1868 general elections.

LAter, between 1871–73, Miall introduced three separate motions in parliament on the subject of disestablishment but he did not achieve his ultimate goal. He died in 1881. During his time, there were concessions gained as a part of deals to ensure that the Liberal Party had the support of the Liberation Society but the Party never became an organ of the Society, although it used the Society's organisational skills for its own purposes. Elisabeth Jay says that Miall's use of secular methods in pursuit of religious change "was perhaps the seed of failure for his great ambition, for the younger men whom he had stirred came to see social and political reform as ends in themselves."

The number of Nonconformists declined fairly uniformly across their various denominations soon after the 1906 general election, which has been described by Ian Machin as "the greatest nonconformist electoral victory" with nearly 200 of their brethren returned to Parliament. With this decline came an lessening of the demands for disestablishment.

Disestablishment of the Church of Ireland took place in 1871 and that of the Church in Wales occurred in 1920 but in neither case did it happen because of the efforts of the Liberation Society. The change had much to do with the fact that Roman Catholicism and Nonconformism, respectively, were clearly favoured by the majority of the population and also because of the effects of nationalism and linguistic variation. Separate campaigning movements emerged in those countries, distinct from the Liberation Society. The situation in Scotland was different again, with the movement losing momentum from around the mid-1880s despite a clear majority of the population not being aligned with the Church of Scotland.

== See also ==
- Secular state

== Sources ==
Bibliography

- "Masheder, Richard (MSDR843R)". A Cambridge Alumni Database. University of Cambridge.
- Helmstadter, Richard J. (1998) [1988], "The Non-Conformist Conscience", in Parsons, Gerald (ed.), Religion in Victorian Britain: Interpretations, Religion in Victorian Britain, vol. IV (Reprinted ed.), Manchester University Press, ISBN 978-0-71902-946-2
- Jay, Elisabeth (1983), The Evangelical and Oxford Movements, Cambridge University Press, ISBN 978-0-52128-669-5
- Jones, Ieuan Gwynedd (1961). "The Liberation Society and Welsh Politics, 1844 to 1868" (PDF). Welsh History Review. 1 (2): 193–224.
- Machin, Ian (2002) [1996], "Disestablishment and Democracy, c. 1840-1930", in Biagini, Eugenio F. (ed.), Citizenship and Community: Liberals, Radicals and Collective Identities in the British Isles, 1865-1931 (Revised ed.), Cambridge University Press, ISBN 978-0-52189-360-2
- Taylor, Miles (1995), The Decline of British Radicalism, 1847-1860, Clarendon Press, ISBN 978-0-19820-482-4
- Mackintosh, William H. (1972), Disestablishment and Liberation, Epworth Press
