= William Cunliffe Lister =

British Whig politician and barrister

Member of Parliament for Bradford
- In office 1 July 1841 – 12 August 1841 Serving with John Hardy
- Preceded by: Ellis Cunliffe Lister; William Busfield
- Succeeded by: John Hardy; William Busfield

Personal details
- Born: 13 December 1809 Addingham, Yorkshire, England
- Died: 12 August 1841 (aged 31)
- Party: Whig

William Cunliffe Lister (13 December 1809 – 12 August 1841) was a British Whig politician, and barrister.

Born in Addingham, Yorkshire, Lister was the son of Ellis Cunliffe Lister—who, between 1832 and 1841, was a Whig Member of Parliament (MP) for Bradford—and Mary née Kay.

First educated at Charterhouse School, in 1825 he was then admitted to Trinity College, Cambridge, graduating with a Bachelor of Arts in 1831, before being called to the bar at Lincoln's Inn in 1834.

He followed his father into politics, becoming a Whig MP for the same constituency when his father retired at the 1841 general election, but died, unmarried, just over a month later.

Parliament of the United Kingdom
Preceded by Ellis Cunliffe Lister; William Busfield	Member of Parliament for Bradford; Jul. 1841–Aug. 1841; With: John Hardy	Succeeded by John Hardy; William Busfield
