= William Edward Forster =

British politician and businessman (1818–1886)

The Right Honourable William Edward Forster FRS
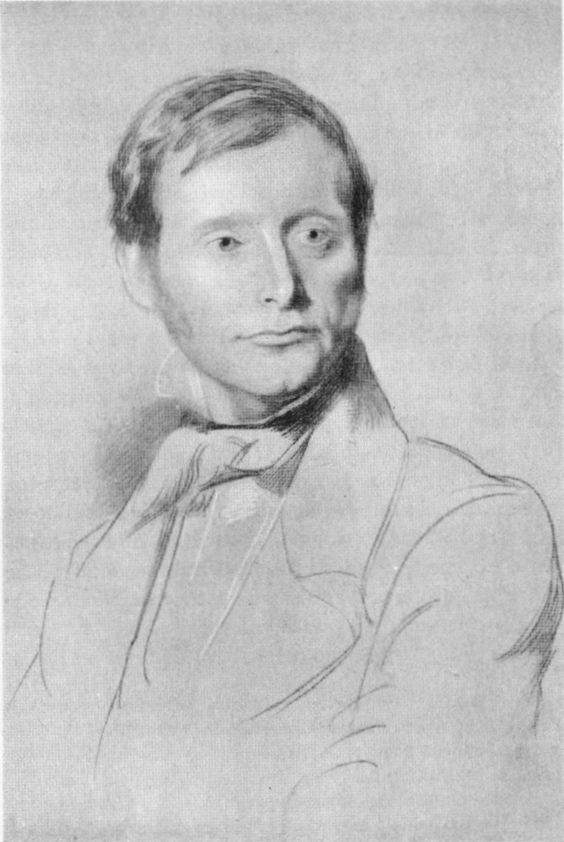
- William Edward Forster in 1851

Chief Secretary for Ireland
- In office 30 April 1880 – 6 May 1882
- Monarch: Victoria
- Prime Minister: William Ewart Gladstone
- Preceded by: James Lowther
- Succeeded by: Lord Frederick Cavendish

Personal details
- Born: 11 July 1818 Bradpole, Dorset
- Died: 5 April 1886 (aged 67)
- Party: Liberal
- Spouse: Jane Martha Arnold (m. 1850)
- Parent: William Forster (father)
- Relatives: Dr Thomas Arnold (father-in-law); Hugh Oakeley Arnold-Forster (nephew); Florence Arnold-Forster (niece); William Delafield Arnold (brother-in-law)

William Edward Forster, PC, FRS (11 July 1818 – 5 April 1886) was an English industrialist, philanthropist and Liberal Party statesman. As a minister in Gladstone's government, he steered through the Elementary Education Act 1870 which was the foundation of compulsory national free education for children in the UK. However his reputation was later greatly tarnished by his coercive policies as Chief Secretary for Ireland during the Land War. His purported advocacy of the Irish Constabulary's use of lethal force against the National Land League earned him the nickname Buckshot Forster from Irish nationalists.

== Early life ==
Born to William and Anna Forster, Quaker parents at Bradpole, near Bridport in Dorset, Forster was educated at the Quaker school at Tottenham, where his father's family had long been settled, and on leaving school he was put into business. He declined to enter a brewery and became involved in woollen manufacture in Burley-in-Wharfedale, Yorkshire. In 1850 he married Jane Martha, eldest daughter of Dr Thomas Arnold. She was not a Quaker and Forster was formally read out of meeting for marrying her, but the Friends who were commissioned to announce the sentence "shook hands and stayed to luncheon". Forster thereafter ranked himself as a member of the Church of England.

The Forsters had no natural children, but when Mrs Forster's brother, William Delafield Arnold, died in 1859, leaving four orphans, the Forsters adopted them as their own. One of the children was Hugh Oakeley Arnold-Forster, a Liberal Unionist member of parliament, who eventually became a member of Balfour's cabinet. Another was Florence Arnold-Forster, who started Limerick Lace and wrote a journal about family life and politics in the 1880s. The youngest child, Frances Egerton Arnold-Forster, compiled the first systematic study of English church dedications, published in 1899 as "Studies in English Church Dedications or England's Patron Saints".

William Forster became known as a practical philanthropist. In 1846–47, he accompanied his father to Ireland as distributor of the Friends' relief fund for the Great Irish Famine in Connemara, and the state of the country made a deep impression on him. He began to take an active part in public affairs by speaking and lecturing.

== Political career ==
In 1859, Forster stood as Liberal candidate for Leeds, but lost. He was highly esteemed in the West Riding, and in 1861 was returned unopposed for Bradford. He was returned again in 1865 (unopposed) and in 1868 (at the head of the poll). He took a prominent part in parliament in the debates on the American Civil War, and in 1865 was made Under-Secretary of State for the Colonies in Lord John Russell's ministry. It was then that he first became a prominent advocate of imperial federation. In 1866, his attitude on parliamentary reform attracted attention. He showed knowledge of the real condition of common people, and foreshadowed Radical legislation, heralding the start of a campaign of educational reform.

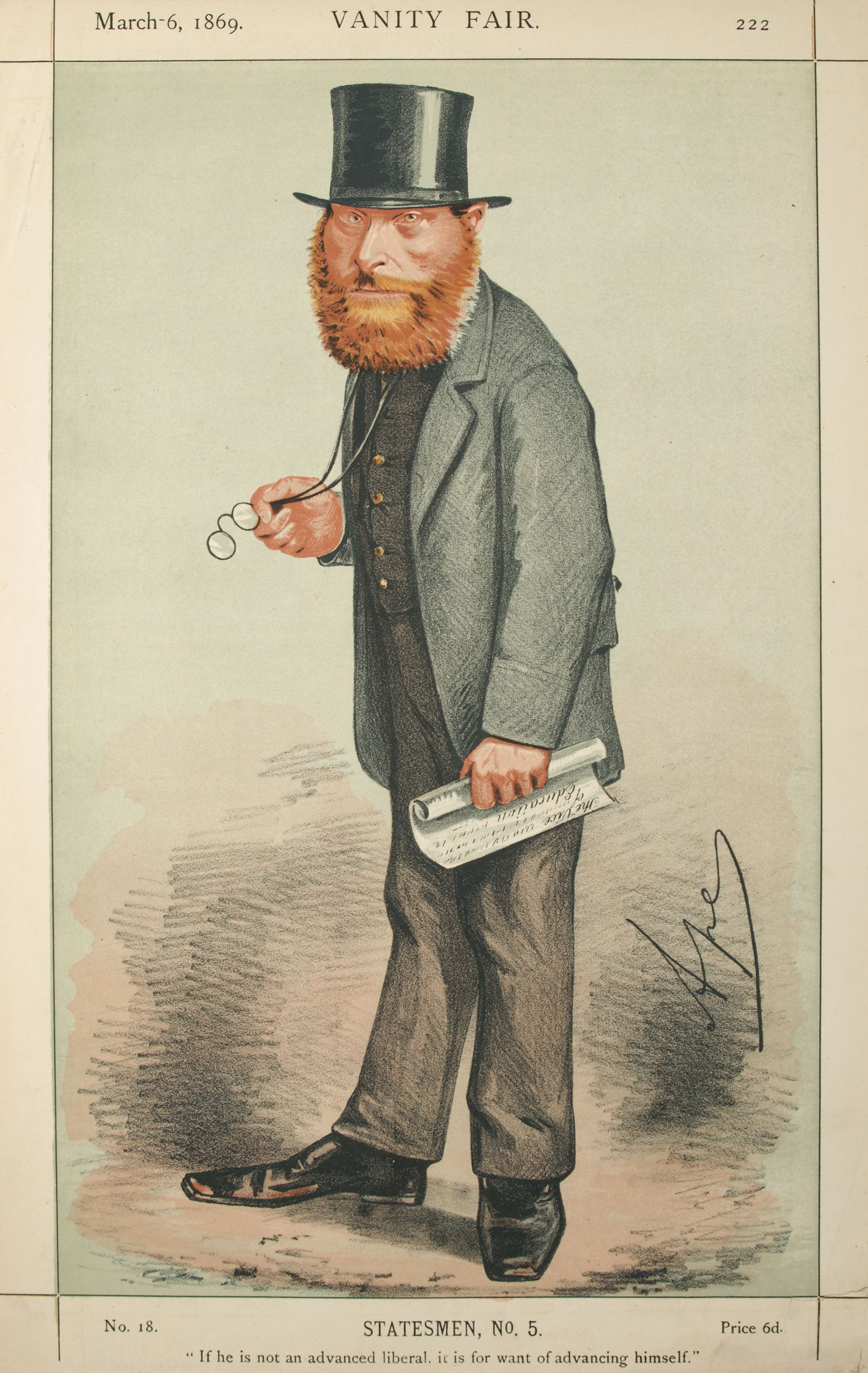
William Edward Forster caricatured by "Ape" in Vanity Fair, 1859

Directly after the Reform Bill had passed, Forster and Edward Cardwell brought in Education Bills in 1867 and 1868. In 1868, when the Liberal party returned to office, Forster was appointed Vice-president of the Council, with the duty of preparing a government measure for national education. The Elementary Education Bill was introduced on 17 February 1870 and school boards were set up with elected representatives (for example, Charles Reed in London) the same year where possible. The religious difficulty at once came to the front. The Manchester Education Union and the National Education League/Birmingham Education League had already formulated in the provinces the two opposing theories, the former standing for the preservation of denominational interests, the latter advocating secular rate-aided education as the only means of protecting Nonconformity against the Established Church.

The Dissenters were not satisfied with Forster's "conscience clause" as contained in the bill, and they regarded him, the ex-Quaker, as a deserter from their own side. They resented the "25th clause", permitting school boards to pay the fees of needy children at denominational schools out of the rates, as an insidious attack on their interests. By 14 March, at the second reading, the controversy had assumed threatening proportions; and George Dixon, the Liberal member for Birmingham and chairman of the National Education League, moved an amendment, the effect of which was to prohibit all religious education in board schools. The government made its rejection a question of confidence, and the amendment was withdrawn; but the result was the insertion of the Cowper-Temple clause (which prohibited the use of distinctive religious formularies in a rate-supported school) as a compromise before the bill passed. The bill of 1870, imperfect as it was, established at last some approach to a system of national education in England.

Forster's next important work was in passing the Ballot Act 1872. In 1874, he was again returned for Bradford. In 1875, when Gladstone "retired", Forster was strongly supported for the leadership of the Liberal party, but declined to be nominated. In the same year he was elected to the Royal Society, and made Lord Rector of Aberdeen University. In 1876, when the Eastern question was looming, he visited Serbia and Turkey, and his subsequent speeches on the subject were marked by moderation. On Gladstone's return to office in 1880, he was made Chief Secretary for Ireland. He carried the Compensation for Disturbance Bill through the Commons, only to see it thrown out in the Lords. On 24 January 1881, he introduced a Coercion Bill in the House of Commons, to deal with the growth of the Land League, and in the course of his speech declared it to be "the most painful duty" he had ever had to perform. The bill passed, among its provisions being one enabling the Irish government to arrest without trial persons "reasonably suspected" of crime and conspiracy. The Irish Party used every opportunity to oppose the act, and Forster was kept constantly on the move between Dublin and London, conducting his campaign and defending it in the House of Commons.

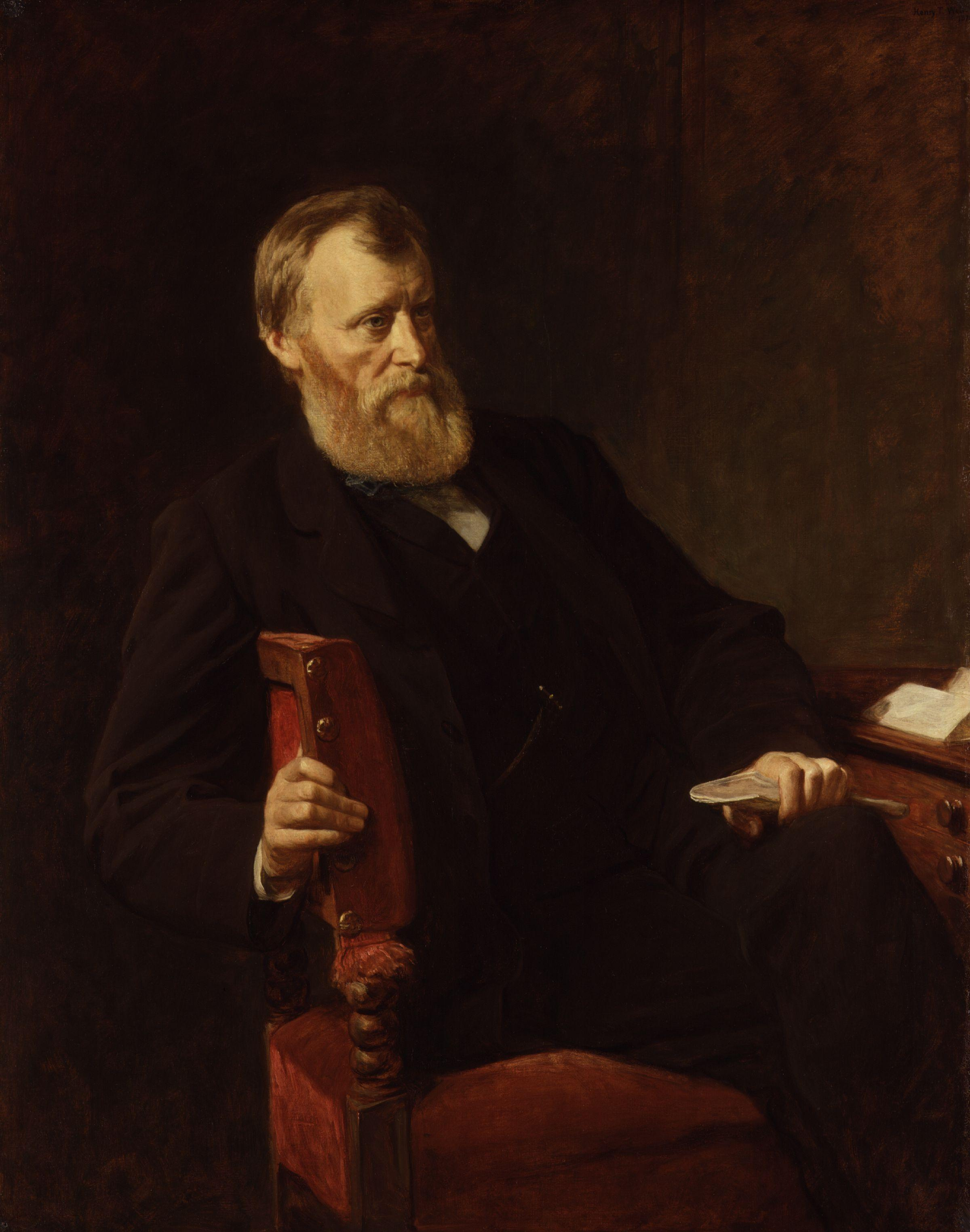
William Edward Forster by Henry Tanworth Wells

He was nicknamed "Buckshot" by the Nationalist press, on the supposition that he had ordered its use by the police when firing on a crowd. On 13 October 1881, Charles Stewart Parnell was arrested, and soon after the Land League was suppressed. From that time Forster's life was in danger, and he had to be escorted by mounted police in Dublin. In speeches given across Ireland in early 1882, Forster, while criticizing the populace for not helping the government, nonetheless pledged that it was the government's duty to protect them. The danger to his life became more apparent, and several plans to murder him were frustrated by the merest accidents. On 2 May 1882, Gladstone announced that the government intended to release Parnell and his fellow-prisoners from Kilmainham Gaol, and that both Lord Cowper-Temple and Forster had in consequence resigned; on the following Saturday, Forster's successor, Lord Frederick Cavendish, was murdered in Phoenix Park, Dublin. Still, Forster offered to return to Dublin temporarily as chief secretary, but the offer was declined. In the ensuing parliamentary session, he charged Parnell with conspiring in the murders, to be in turn denounced by Parnell.

During the remaining years of his life, Forster's political record covered various interesting subjects, but his efforts in Ireland threw them all into shadow. He was at variance with Gladstone's Liberalism, for example in policies towards Sudan and Transvaal. When the constituency of Bradford was divided into three, he was returned for the central division but did not take up his seat.

Forster died in London on 5 April 1886, on the eve of the introduction of the First Home Rule Bill, which he had opposed. His funeral took place at Westminster Abbey and his remains were returned to be buried near his home in Burley-in-Wharfedale.

== Grave and inscription ==
Forster's grave can be found in God's Acre Cemetery, Burley-in-Wharfedale. The inscription reads:

To the beloved memory
of
William Edward Forster
Born at Bradpole Dorset
July 11th 1818

Died in London
April 5th 1886

He represented the Borough of Bradford in Parliament during 25 years holding at various times the offices of Under Secretary for the Colonies Vice President of the Education Department and Chief Secretary for Ireland.

Eager in all things to promote the welfare of his countrymen, labouring especially for the national education and succeeding finally in extending it throughout the land, prompt and watchful with hereditary sympathy to defend the cause of weak or oppressed races

Striving with unwearied devotion & unfailing courage to give order and peace to Ireland. Ever upholding the ideal of an united realm in which the mother country and her colonies should be linked together in peaceful strength.

"After he had served his own generation by the will of God he fell on sleep."

After a funeral Service in Westminster Abbey his mortal remains were laid to rest here near his home in Wharfedale.

Let thy mercy O Lord be upon us according as we hope in thee
Psalm XXXIII v22

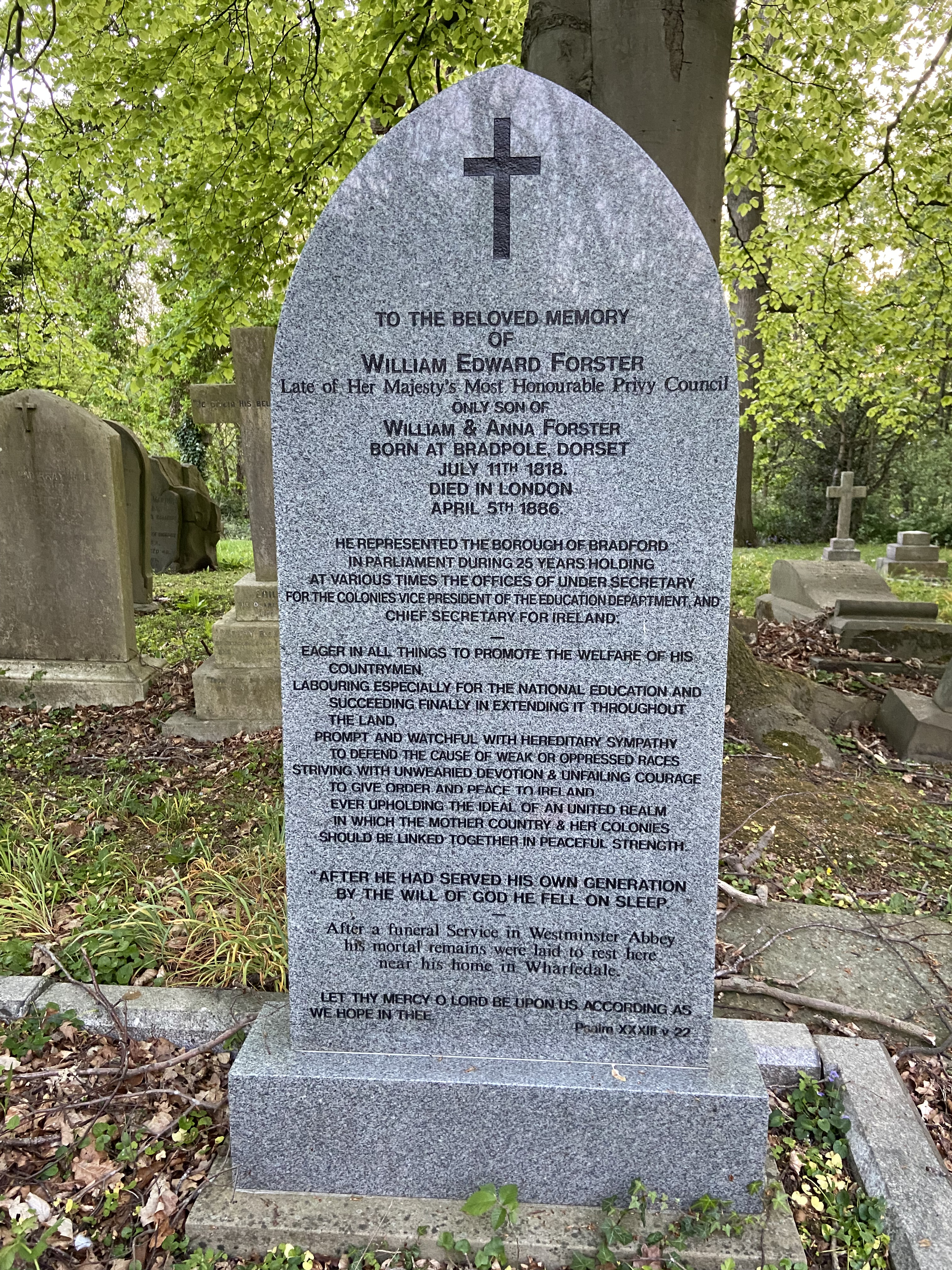
Gravestone of William Edward Forster in Burley-in-Wharfedale

== In popular culture ==
Forster is referred to as 'Buckshot' in the Irish folk song "Monto" made famous by The Dubliners and in Andy Irvine's song Forgotten Hero about Michael Davitt.

== Sources ==
- Leigh Rayment's Peerage Pages

== Memorial ==
There is a memorial to him in his home village of Bradpole.

Parliament of the United Kingdom
Preceded by Titus Salt; Henry Wickham Wickham	Member of Parliament for Bradford; 1861 – 1885; With: Henry Wickham Wickham 1861–1867; Matthew William Thompson 1867–1868; Henry Ripley 1868–1869; Edward Miall 1869–1874; Henry Ripley 1874–1880; Alfred Illingworth 1880–1885	Constituency abolished
New constituency	Member of Parliament for Bradford Central; 1885–1886	Succeeded by George Shaw-Lefevre
Political offices
Preceded by Chichester Parkinson-Fortescue	Under-Secretary of State for the Colonies; 1865–1866	Succeeded by Charles Adderley
Preceded by Lord Robert Montagu	Vice-President of the Committee on Education; 1868–1874	Succeeded by Viscount Sandon
Preceded by James Lowther	Chief Secretary for Ireland; 1880–1882	Succeeded by Lord Frederick Cavendish
Academic offices
Preceded by Thomas Henry Huxley	Rector of the University of Aberdeen; 1875–1878	Succeeded by The Earl of Rosebery

Catrgory:British industrialists
