= The Empress and the English Doctor =

2022 non-fiction book by journalist Lucy Ward

- Author: Lucy Ward
- Language: English
- Genre: History
- Publisher: Oneworld Publications
- Publication date: 2022
- Publication place: United Kingdom
- ISBN: 9780861545186

The Empress and the English Doctor: How Catherine the Great Defied a Deadly Virus is a 2022 non-fiction book by British journalist Lucy Ward.

Booklist included The Empress and the English Doctor book on their list of the "Top 10 Health & Wellness Books" of 2023.

== About the author ==
Ward grew up in Manchester and trained as a journalist with the Bradford Telegraph and Argus before moving to The Guardian. From 2010 to 2012, she and her family lived in Moscow.
