= Titus Salt =

English industrialist and politician (1803–1876)

Sir Titus Salt Bt
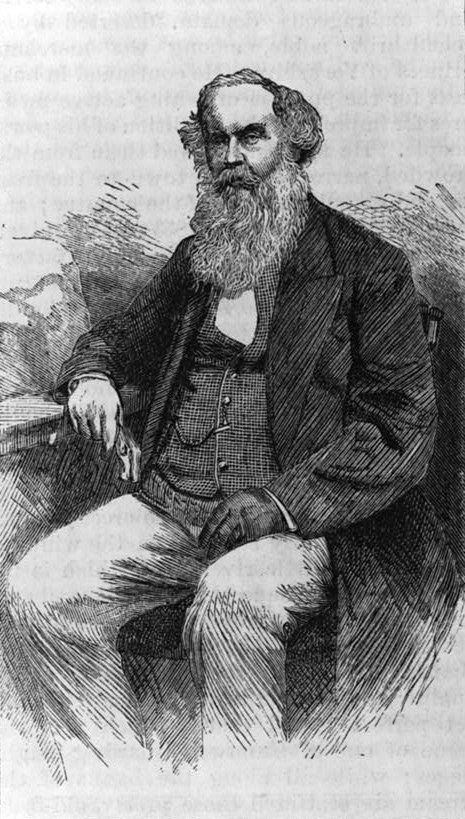
- Illustration of Salt, 1872

Member of Parliament for Bradford
- In office 19 May 1859 – 1 February 1861 Serving with Henry Wickham Wickham
- Preceded by: Thomas Perronet Thompson
- Succeeded by: William Edward Forster

Personal details
- Born: 20 September 1803 Morley, Yorkshire, England
- Died: 29 December 1876 (aged 73) Lightcliffe, Yorkshire, England
- Resting place: Saltaire Congregational Church
- Party: Liberal
- Spouse: Caroline Whitlam (m. 1830)
- Children: 11
- Education: Batley Grammar School
- Occupation: Manufacturer, politician
- Known for: Founding of Saltaire

Sir Titus Salt, 1st Baronet (20 September 1803 – 29 December 1876) was an English manufacturer, politician and philanthropist in Bradford, West Riding of Yorkshire, England, who is best known for having built Salt's Mill, a large textile mill, together with the attached village of Saltaire, West Yorkshire.

== Early life ==
Titus Salt was born in 1803 to Daniel Salt, a drysalter, and Grace Smithies, daughter of Isaac Smithies, of Old Manor House, Morley where the Salt family were to live. Titus attended a local dame school and then Batley Grammar School. In 1813, the Salt family moved to a farm at Crofton near Wakefield and Daniel became a sheep farmer. Titus attended “the day school connected with Salem Chapel” in Wakefield and later, the grammar school.

Titus made a long-standing friend at the day school - his teacher, Enoch Harrison. In 1853, Harrison was a guest at Salt's Mill's opening banquet on Salt's 50th birthday.

== Career ==
Salt's first job was as a wool-stapler in Wakefield but the family moved to Bradford in 1820, bringing that post to a close. Whilst father Daniel set up as a dealer in wool, Titus spent two years learning about textile manufacture at William Rouse and Sons before joining his father's company which traded in Russian Donskoi wool amongst others. Donskoi was widely used in the woollens trade but not in the manufacture of worsted cloth. Titus encouraged the Bradford spinners to use Donskoi in worsted manufacture, with no success. So father and son decided to utilise it themselves and set up as spinner and manufacturer. The experiment was a success.

Between 1833 and 1835, the Salt business changed significantly. Daniel retired; Titus's brother Edward joined; Titus struck out on his own; and the family partnership was dissolved.

During this same period, Titus embarked on experiments with alpaca wool from Peru. The first documentary record of Salt encountering the wool is in his Day Book. On 27 June 1835, Salt recorded one bag of “Peruvian wool”.

The story of Salt's discovery of the fibre is well known, not least because it was published by Charles Dickens in a slightly fictionalised form in the magazine Household Words. Salt came upon bales of alpaca wool in a warehouse in Liverpool and, after taking some samples away to experiment, came back and bought the consignment. According to Balgarnie, his friend and biographer, the tale is substantially true.

Though he was not the first in England to work with the fibre, he was the creator of the lustrous and subsequently fashionable cloth called 'alpaca'. It was this that transformed Salt from successful young businessman to the largest employer in Bradford.

Around 1850, he decided to build a mill large enough to consolidate his textile manufacture in one place. However, he "did not like to be a party to increasing that already over-crowded borough [Bradford]" and bought land three miles from Bradford, in Shipley, next to the River Aire, the Leeds and Liverpool Canal and the Midland Railway. In 1851, the construction of the factory began. Saltaire Mills, now known as Salt's Mill, opened with that grand banquet, on his 50th birthday, 20 September 1853. The construction of the village of Saltaire, with its houses, almshouses, shops, schools, an infirmary, a club and institute, baths and washhouses, started in the following year. In 1858–59, he built the congregational church, now Saltaire United Reformed Church, later donating land on which the Wesleyan chapel was built by public subscription in 1866–68.

Famously, he forbade 'beershops' in Saltaire, but the common supposition that he was teetotal himself is untrue.

Salt was a private man and left no written statement of his purposes in creating Saltaire, but he told Lord Harewood at the opening of Salt's Mill that he had built the place "to do good and to give his sons employment".

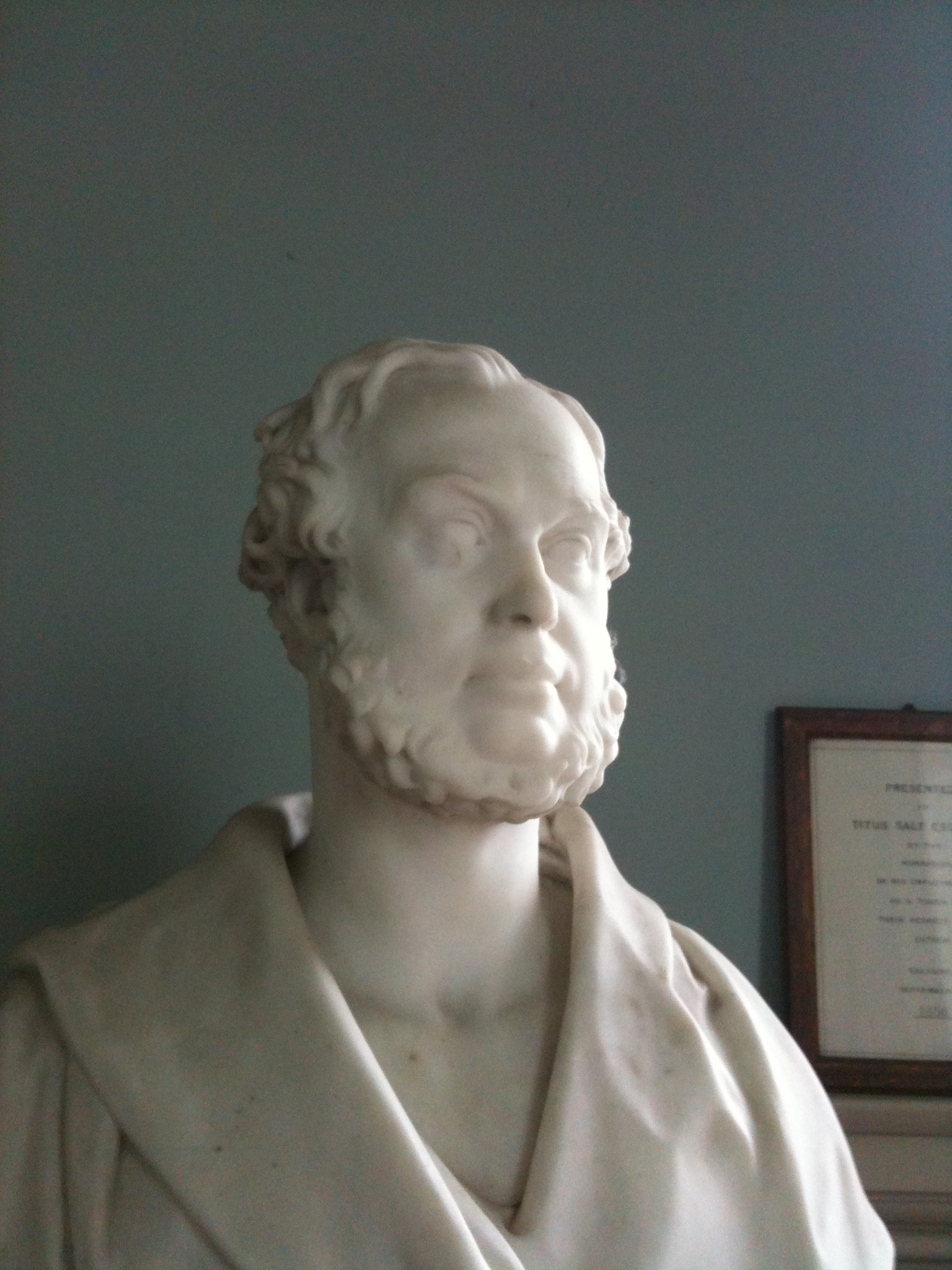
Bust of Titus Salt (not then a baronet) presented to him by his workforce in 1856 and now in Saltaire United Reformed Church.

In David James's assessment:

"Salt's motives in building Saltaire remain obscure. They seem to have been a mixture of sound economics, Christian duty, and a desire to have effective control over his workforce. There were economic reasons for moving out of Bradford, and the village did provide him with an amenable, handpicked workforce. Yet Salt was deeply religious and sincerely believed that, by creating an environment where people could lead healthy, virtuous, godly lives, he was doing God's work. Perhaps, also, diffident and inarticulate as he was, the village may have been a way of demonstrating the extent of his wealth and power. Lastly, he may also have seen it as a means of establishing an industrial dynasty to match the landed estates of his Bradford contemporaries. However, Saltaire provided no real solution to the relationship between employer and worker. Its small size, healthy site, and comparative isolation provided an escape rather than an answer to the problems of urban industrial society".

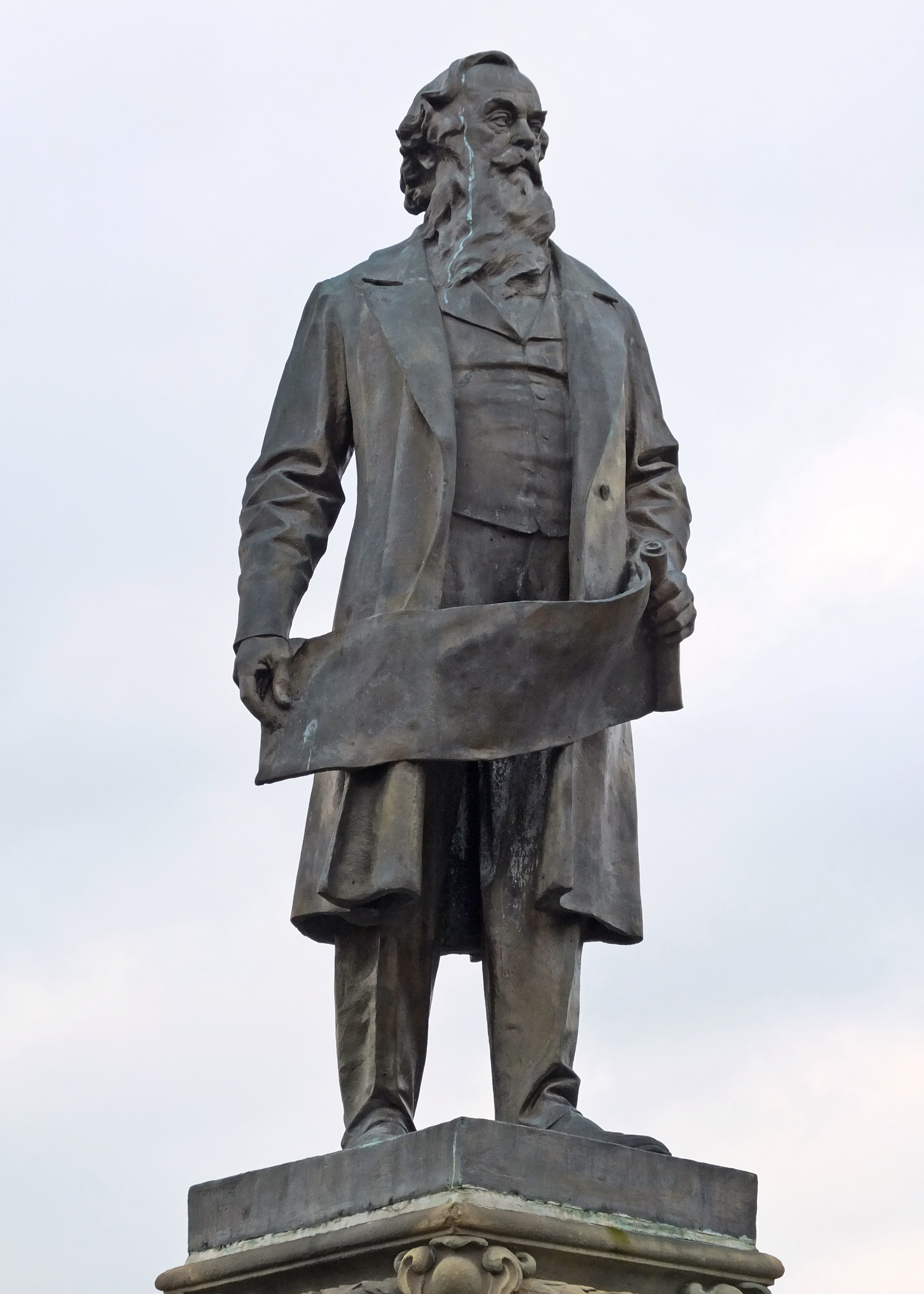
Titus Salt's statue in Roberts Park

Saltaire was named alongside Hyde, Egerton (then Turton), Tottington (Bury), Bollington, Holbeck (Leeds), Belper and Copley as an example of workers' colonies built by British rural factory owners in the Austrian economist Emil Sax's 1869 book Die Wohnungszustände der arbeitenden Classen und ihre Reform. Sax reported that "the employers' main motive for building dwellings for their workers" was to increase their productivity by shortening their walking commute, and construed the projects as "housing reform". In The Housing Question, Friedrich Engels objected to this view and explained that the colonies constituted a "cottage system" in which the employers doubled as landlords, and could thereby impose monopoly prices and prevent strikes with the threat of eviction. On these grounds, he commented, "for factory production in the rural districts expenditure on workers' dwellings was a necessary part of the total investment of capital, and a very profitable one, both directly and indirectly".

== Public life ==
Titus was a politically active and conscientious citizen, arguing for change and financially supporting it. In the 1830s, both Daniel and Titus were founders of the Bradford Reform Society. In 1838, he made a gift to the Bradford Mechanics Hall Building Fund, signalling his support for the education of working people and, in 1842, in response to pollution, he installed Rodda Smoke Burners in the chimneys of his mills. As mayor of Bradford, he tried to persuade the council to require all of the town's factory owners to install them, but he was unsuccessful.

He occupied many public positions. Before Bradford's incorporation as a borough, he was elected as Constable on two consecutive years. At incorporation in 1847, he was elected as a senior alderman. He became the second Mayor of Bradford, in office from 1848 to 1849, and was one of the first borough magistrates. In 1857, Salt was President of the Bradford Chamber of Commerce. Later, he was Deputy Lieutenant for the West Riding of Yorkshire and appointed to the Riding's Commission of the Peace.

From 1859 until he retired through ill health on 1 February 1861, Salt served as Liberal Member of Parliament for Bradford. At the 1859 hustings which would choose him as the party's candidate, Salt spoke of the political positions he had taken in his life: "Mr. Salt then came forward and said he had always been of the opinion that the intelligent working classes were entitled to the exercise of the franchise. He need not tell them that he had advocated all the great questions relating to the liberties of the people - amongst others, the Catholic Emancipation Bill, and the Repeal of the Corn Laws, which he supported from first to last. In fact, he had ever supported all measures for the extension of freedom, whether civil, commercial, or religious. He would, if returned to parliament, support Lord John Russell's Reform Bill, as a practical measure . He was an advocate of peace; of non-interference in European politics. He believed the ballot was necessary for the protection of the working classes who possessed votes."

After he agreed to exhibit at the 1867 Paris Exposition, Salt was awarded the French Légion d'honneur for his exemplary philanthropic approach to business in founding Saltaire. On 30 October 1869, he was created a Baronet, of Saltaire and Crow Nest in the County of York.

== Philanthropy ==
"One of the most celebrated traits of Sir Titus Salt was his philanthropy", say Barlo and Shaw. They list many of his gifts and estimate that the total value was "approx.£139,000". However, they warn that their list "should not be regarded as complete," and a new study has confirmed this caution. It identifies a total of 269 gifts with an original value of nearly £170,000 and says that “At today's prices, this represents more than £16,000,000”.

Most of Salts' gifts benefitted the Bradford area but Hull, Scarborough and Grimsby feature along with places many hundred miles from northern England. In 1867, Salt provided the funds to pay for the first Royal National Lifeboat Institution (RNLI) lifeboat to be stationed at Stromness, Orkney. The boat was duly named Saltaire.

Several gifts benefitted people from outside Britain. For example “sufferers of a fire in Hamburg” in 1842; “Hungarian refugees” in 1850; and the “sick and wounded of the armies of the two Nations engaged in war on the Continent” in 1870.

== Personal life and death ==
On 21 August 1830, Salt married Caroline, daughter of George Whitlam, of Great Grimsby. They had eleven children, six sons and five daughters. The children each have a street named after them in Saltaire.

- William Henry Salt born 5 December 1831
- George Salt born 22 April 1833
- Amelia Salt born 29 November 1835
- Edward Salt born 3 April 1837
- Herbert Salt born 17 April 1840
- Fanny Caroline Salt born 7 August 1841 died aged 19 on 4 August 1861
- Titus Salt, commonly known as Titus Salt Jr, born 28 August 1843
- Whitlam Salt born 20 October 1846 died 5 April 1851 aged 4
- Mary Salt born 30 April 1849 died 14 May 1851 aged 2
- Helen Salt born 19 June 1852
- Ada Salt born 18 November 1853

In 1876 Salt died at his home, Crow Nest, Lightcliffe, near Halifax. "Estimates vary, but the number of people lining the route [of the funeral cortege, from Lightcliffe to Bradford to Saltaire] probably exceeded 100,000."

Salt was buried at Saltaire Congregational Church as were his wife and many of his children.

== See also ==
- Joseph Rowntree (philanthropist)
- George Cadbury
- Lever Brothers

Parliament of the United Kingdom
Preceded by Thomas Perronet Thompson and Henry Wickham Wickham	Member of Parliament for Bradford; 1859–1861; With: Henry Wickham Wickham	Succeeded by William Edward Forster and Henry Wickham Wickham
Baronetage of the United Kingdom
New creation	Baronet (of Saltaire); 1869–1876	Succeeded by William Henry Salt
