= Ellis Cunliffe Lister =

English Liberal politician

Ellis Cunliffe Lister-Kay (12 May 1774 – 24 November 1853) was an English Liberal politician who sat in the House of Commons from 1832 to 1841.

== Life ==
He was born as Ellis Cunliffe, the son of John Cunliffe of the ancient, wealthy mill-owning Cunliffe family of Addingham. In 1809 his name was legally changed to Ellis Cunliffe-Lister under the will of his first wife's uncle, Samuel Lister. He built and leased four mills in Bradford, including Red Beck Mill at Shipley in 1817, and served as a J.P.

At the 1832 general election Lister was elected Member of Parliament for Bradford. He held the seat until 1841.

By 1837 Lister had erected Manningham Mill at Manningham, Bradford for his two sons, John and Samuel., and he took up residence there himself. In 1840 he and his fellow Bradford M.P. William Busfield attended the World Anti-Slavery Convention in London. In 1842 he changed his name again, this time to the triple-barrelled Ellis Cunliffe-Lister-Kay, under the will of his second wife's father, William Kay.

Lister married Ruth Myers Lister on 1 April 1795. In 1809, he married Mary Kay, daughter of William Kay, as his second wife. In 1844, he took Eliza Mellifont Talbot, daughter of Richard Talbot, as his third wife.

Parliament of the United Kingdom
New constituency	Member of Parliament for Bradford; 1832 – 1841; With: John Hardy to 1837; William Busfield 1837–1841	Succeeded by John Hardy; William Cunliffe Lister
