= Geoff Mellor =

English writer

Geoffrey James Mellor (1920–1999) was an English writer and show business historian known for his books and journalism about films, theatre, the music hall and comedians. He published his books alternately under the names Geoff Mellor and G. J. Mellor.

== Life and career ==
Mellor was from Bradford and his writing focused largely on the entertainment world of the local area. As a journalist he wrote mostly for the Bradford Telegraph & Argus and The Stage newspaper. He began writing about entertainment in 1961 and was regarded by the Telegraph and Argus as an expert in the field. The National Archives at Kew holds Mellor's working papers and research materials covering the years 1940–95. These include his extensive research in the history of music halls, cinema and theatre in Bradford and the North of England, among them proofs of his books and typescripts of unfinished books, programmes, handbills, news cuttings, photographs and postcards. The documents were salvaged from Mellor's house after his death and represent only a portion of his complete archive as many items were too badly damaged to be saved, while other material was scrapped and some sold to local dealers.

In They Made Us Laugh, his writing style is described thus:

As a Yorkshireman, Geoff Mellor has a forthright rather than an academic approach to his subject matter.

== Selected books ==
- Pom Poms and Ruffles (1966)
- Northern Music Hall (1970)
- Picture Pioneers (1971)
- Theatres of Bradford (1978)
- They Made Us Laugh (1982)
- Cinemas of Bradford (1983)
- Movie Makers and Picture Palaces (1996)

== Death and legacy ==
Mellor died on his way from his home in Langbar Avenue, Heaton, Bradford, to the Leeds City Varieties where he was due to review the Good Old Days. He collapsed in Lands Lane and was taken to Leeds General Infirmary where he died. In tribute, Telegraph & Argus columnist Mike Priestley, who had worked with Mellor, praised him for his "tremendous fund of knowledge of the world of theatre and early cinema".

Mellor lived alone and after his death, Bradford Council's social services searched his house for clues to trace members of his family.

In 2000 a film heritage guide to Bradford and surrounding areas written by Mellor was launched posthumously by actor Tom Courtenay.
