= Compensation for Disturbance Bill =

The Compensation for Disturbance Bill (Ireland - 1880), under pressure from John O'Connor Power, member for County Mayo, was introduced by Ireland's Chief Secretary, W.E. Forster, on 18 June 1880 as a temporary measure to deal with a deteriorating situation in Ireland brought about by the Irish famine and Land League agitation.

Sir Charles Russell made a reference to the Irish land question and the Bill in his speech at the Special Commission on Parnellism and Crime in early April 1889:

"That being the scheme which yesterday, in connection with the Compensation for Disturbance Bill, I pointed out to your Lordships was formally introduced in the House of Commons at the instance of the Land League by Mr O'Connor Power, then one of the members for Mayo, and the principle of which was afterwards adopted by the Government of the day and passed, by the second reading of the Compensation for Disturbance Bill through that House."

It empowered courts in certain cases to compensate a tenant upon eviction even if the eviction was for non-payment of rent, provided that the tenant could prove that inability to pay was a direct result of agricultural and economic depression.

The Bill was to apply to designated areas in the west and south of Ireland for a period of eighteen months only.

The Bill passed through the House of Commons of the United Kingdom but met with a devastating defeat (282 votes to 5) in the House of Lords.

Contemporary reports estimated that the House had rarely been so crowded as during the debate on this Bill which so deeply affected the landlord class. Joseph Chamberlain remarked "The Bill is rejected; the civil war has begun".

Rejection of the Bill resulted in an escalation of activities by the Land League.
