= Henry Wickham Wickham =

British politician

Henry Wickham Wickham (1800 – 23 September 1867) was a British Conservative party politician.

He was Member of Parliament (MP) for Bradford in West Yorkshire from 1852 until his death in 1867.

Parliament of the United Kingdom
Preceded by Thomas Perronet Thompson and Robert Milligan	Member of Parliament for Bradford; 1852 – 1867; With: Robert Milligan (1852–1857); Thomas Perronet Thompson (1857–1859); Titus Salt (1859–1861); William Edward Forster (1861–1867)	Succeeded by William Edward Forster and Matthew William Thompson
