= Milligan and Forbes Warehouse =

Office building in Bradford, West Yorkshire, England

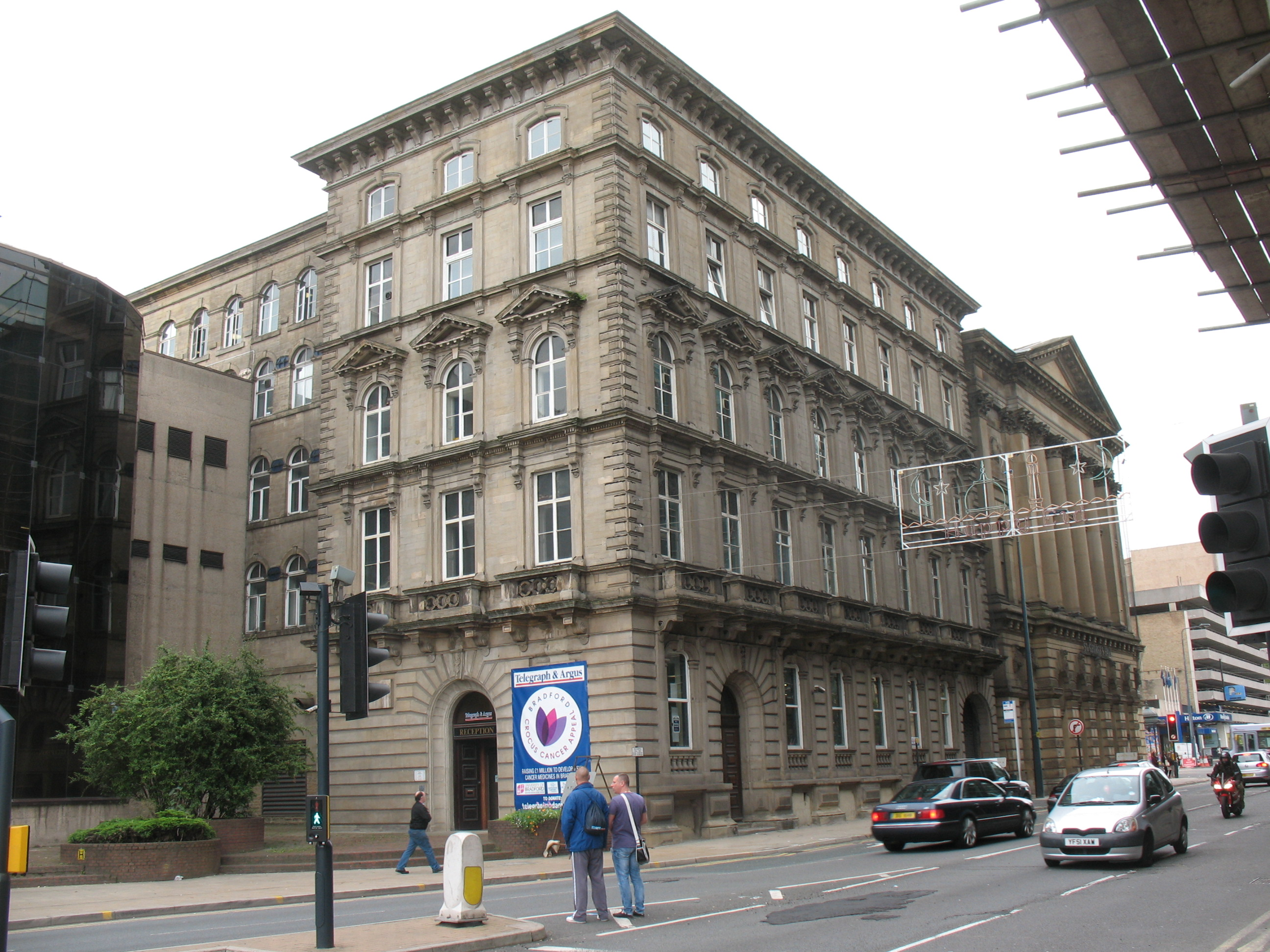
- Milligan and Forbes Warehouse, now the Telegraph and Argus headquarters on Hall Ings, Bradford.
- Interactive map of the Milligan and Forbes Warehouse area

General information
- Architectural style: Palazzo style
- Location: Bradford, United Kingdom
- Current tenants: Telegraph and Argus
- Named for: Milligan and Forbes
- Opened: 1853

Design and construction
- Designations: Grade II listed

The Milligan and Forbes Warehouse in Bradford, West Yorkshire, is a grade II listed building built as the eponymous stuff merchants' warehouse in the 19th century. It is considered the city's first building in the Palazzo style and was very influential on 19th-century Bradford architecture.

== History ==
Robert Milligan was born in Kirkcudbright, Dumfries and Galloway, on 10 October 1786. He settled in Bradford in about 1810 and established a drapers shop in Kirkgate, eventually beginning a career as a stuff merchant. He became head of the firm of Milligan, Forbes and Co, which became synonymous with the stuff trade in Bradford. Milligan was the first Mayor of Bradford (1847–48) and subsequently Liberal MP for the borough in three successive Parliaments between 1851 and 1857. His partner, London traveller Henry Forbes, was also mayor of Bradford in 1849–50.

The firm decided to build a new warehouse for home trade and a site was purchased on Hall Ings next to the soon to be built St George's Hall. Andrew and Delauney, who would later build impressive structures in Bradford's Little Germany district, were the architectural firm chosen to design the building. The style is similar and perhaps based on the warehouses created by Edward Walters in Manchester around this time. Both St George's Hall and Milligan and Forbes were completed in 1853, with the warehouse considered today as Bradford's first Palazzo building. It was intended to complement its neighbour and indeed it was described in the Imperial Gazetteer of England and Wales (published 1870–72) as "not much inferior to that pile in magnificence".

In the 1920s, Bradford's local newspaper company, the Telegraph and Argus, moved into the building and is still operating, on a massively reduced scale, from there today. Because of the increasing demands of newspaper production, a large extension was added to the original Victorian building, although it is now redundant. The Bradford architects Robinson Design Partnership designed the smoked-glass press hall, opened in 1981.

== See also ==
- Listed buildings in Bradford (City Ward)
