= Matthew William Thompson =

British railway director and Liberal Party politician

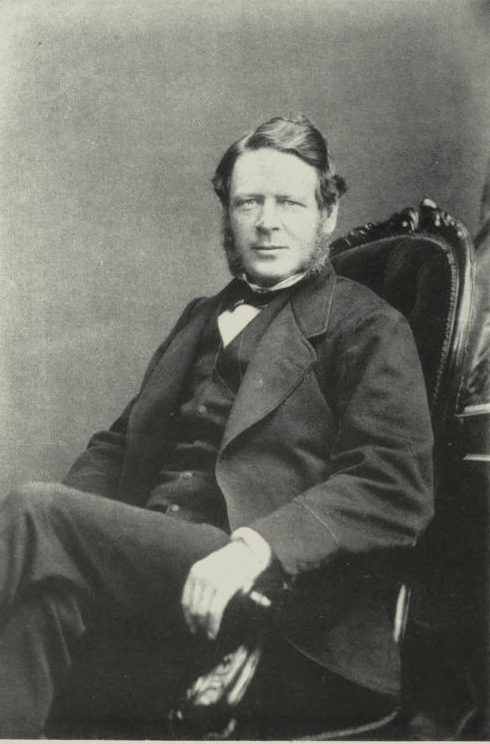
Matthew William Thompson, in the 1860s

Sir Matthew William Thompson, 1st Baronet (1 February 1820 – 1 December 1891) was a British railway director and Liberal Party politician.

He was elected as Member of Parliament (MP) for Bradford in West Yorkshire at a by-election in 1867, but did not contest the 1868 general election.

== Early life ==
Born at Manningham in the West Riding of Yorkshire, he was the son of Matthew Thompson of Manningham Lodge, Bradford, by Elizabeth Sarah, daughter of the Rev. William Atkinson of Thorparch. His father was co-owner, with his brother Benjamin, of Thompson's Mill on Sunbridge Road, Bradford, built 1803 by their uncle Benjamin Peile. It was later there where Titus Salt first went into business on his own account.

Thompson was educated at West Riding Proprietary School and Giggleswick School. He matriculated in 1840 at Trinity College, Cambridge, graduating B.A. in 1843 and M.A. in 1846. He was called to the bar at the Inner Temple in 1847, and for ten years practised as a conveyancing counsel.

Thompson retired from the bar in 1857 and returned to Bradford to help manage a family brewery. Shortly he became involved in municipal affairs, as a town councillor in 1858, an alderman in 1860, and mayor of Bradford in 1862. In 1865 he was elected a director of the Midland Railway.

== National politics ==
In 1867 Thompson was returned as a Liberal-Conservative Member of Parliament for Bradford, with William Edward Forster as his colleague. He was not a dedicated politician, and did not stand at the general election in 1868; but on the unseating of the conservative member, Henry William Ripley, in March 1869, he again contested the constituency, but was defeated. In 1871 and 1872 he was re-elected mayor of Bradford, and in October 1873 was publicly entertained and a presentation of plate made to him in recognition of his services.

== Later life ==
In 1879 Thompson became chairman of the Midland Railway company. He was also chairman of the Glasgow and South-Western Railway, and a director and some time chairman of the Forth Bridge railway company. The sanction of parliament for the erection of the Forth Bridge had been obtained in 1873, but the work was not begun till 1882, and the direction of the policy of the Midland Railway company was greatly influenced by Thompson. The shareholders of the Forth Bridge company were guaranteed 4% on their capital by the North British, Midland, Great Northern, and North-Eastern companies, and the work was completed in January 1890, and formally opened by the Prince of Wales on 4 March 1890. On this occasion a baronetcy was conferred upon Thompson, in recognition of the ability with which he had helped forward the undertaking.

Thompson resigned the chairmanship of the Midland Railway company in 1890, owing to failing health. He died at Guiseley on 1 December 1891, and was buried on 5 December in the churchyard, Guiseley.

== Family ==
Thompson married on 10 May 1843 Mary Anne Thompson, a first cousin, who survived him. She was the daughter of his uncle Benjamin Thompson, of Parkgate, Guiseley, who possessed the controlling influence in the Bradford Old Brewery (founded 1757): his wife was Elizabeth Whitaker, daughter of William Whitaker who was one of the brewery's partners.

The couple had three sons and two daughters. The children were:

- Sir Peile Thompson, 2nd Baronet (1844–1918)
- Reginald Thompson (1846–1932), army officer
- William Whittaker Thompson (1857–1920), barrister
- Eliza married 1871 the Rev. John Vowler Tanner.
- Bertha Mary (died 1915) married in 1894 Charles James Atkinson (1850–1917), of Bathwick Hill House and Cheltenham.

== Notes ==
Attribution

This article incorporates text from a publication now in the public domain: "Thompson, Matthew William". Dictionary of National Biography. London: Smith, Elder & Co. 1885–1900.

Parliament of the United Kingdom
Preceded by Henry Wickham Wickham and William Edward Forster	Member of Parliament for Bradford; 1867 – 1868; With: William Edward Forster	Succeeded by Henry Ripley and William Edward Forster
