= Telegraph & Argus =

Local newspaper in Bradford, England

Coordinates: 53°47′34″N 1°45′02″W

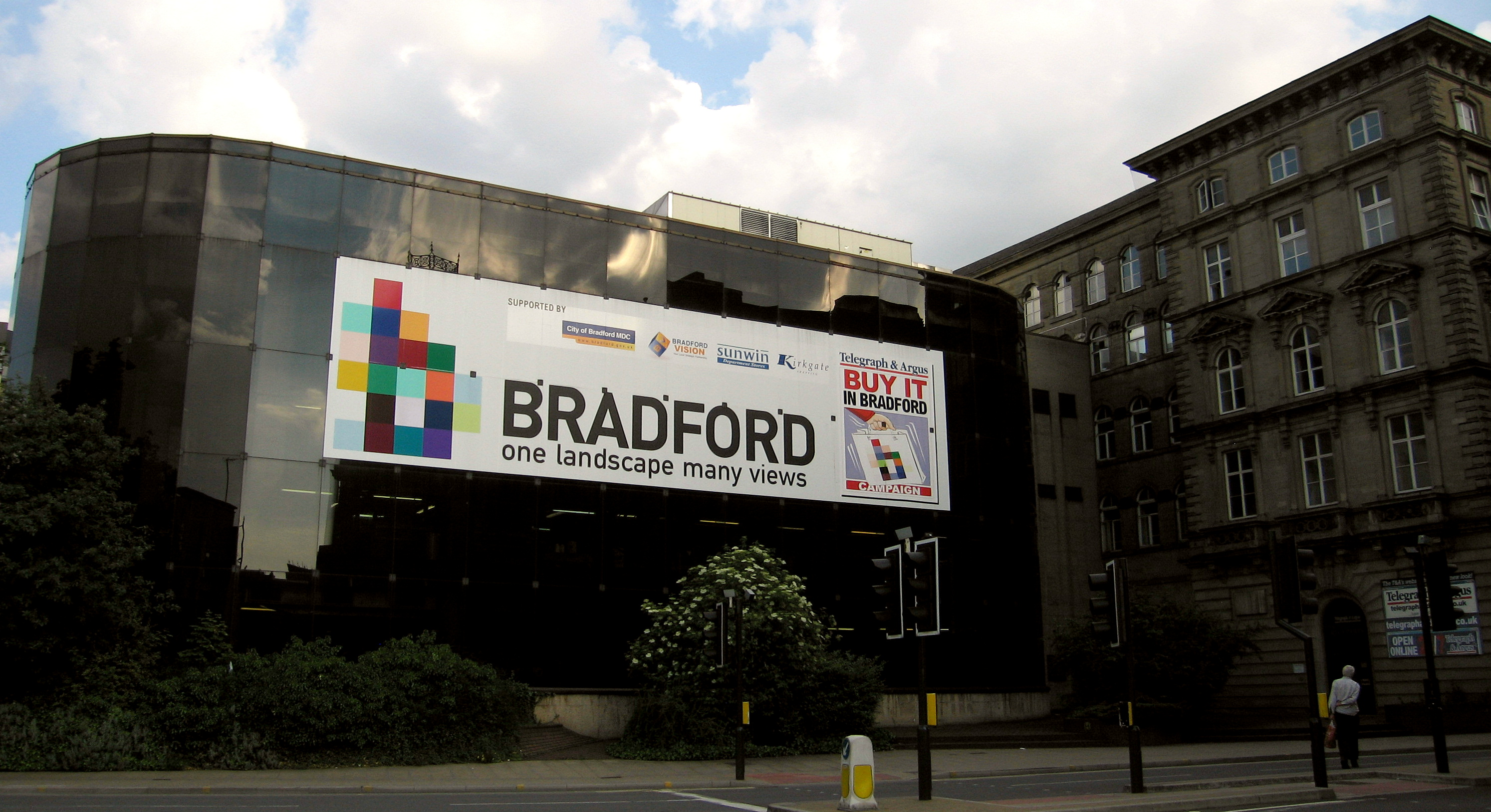
- T & A building, in 2009
- Type: Daily newspaper
- Format: Tabloid
- Owner: USA Today Co.
- Publisher: Newsquest
- Editor: Nigel Burton
- Founded: 1868
- Language: English
- Headquarters: Bradford
- Circulation: 3,732 (as of 2024)
- ISSN: 0307-3610
- Website: thetelegraphandargus.co.uk

The Telegraph & Argus is the daily newspaper for Bradford, West Yorkshire, England. It is published six times each week, from Monday to Saturday inclusive. The newspaper has offices in Newhall Way, Bradford, from where its journalists work. Locally, the paper is known as the T&A. It also breaks news 24/7 on its website.

== Overview ==
Founded in 1868, the paper was a broadsheet until 1989 when it became tabloid. It features a range of news, features, sport, lifestyle articles, classified advertising and special supplements.

The Telegraph & Argus is owned by Newsquest, the second largest publisher of regional newspapers in the United Kingdom, which is owned by the American media empire Gannett. Perry Austin-Clarke was editor from 1992 to 2017, making him the paper's longest-serving editor. As of 2017, the editor was Nigel Burton.

== History ==
=== Bradford Daily Telegraph ===
The Bradford Daily Telegraph was founded by a Scot, Thomas Shields (1832–1887). Upon his death, two of his siblings, Agnes Shields (1835–1920) and Archibald Barr Shields (1842–1905) assumed control. In 1898, Agnes and Archibald Shields sold The Telegraph to a newly formed entity, the Bradford and District Newspaper Company. The company's chairman was James Hill (1849–1936) — a successful wool merchant who would later be knighted and serve as the Liberal MP for Bradford Central. Meredith Thompson Whittaker (1841–1931), an experienced newspaper executive, was appointed managing director. Whittaker was a brother of Sir Thomas Palmer Whittaker (1850–1919), M.P. for Spen Valley. Other members of the board included Alfred Holden Illingworth (1869–1925) and his 1st cousin, Percy Holden Illingworth (1869–1915); David Wade (1846–1915); and Thomas Whiteley (1850–1923), great grandfather of John Richard Whiteley (1943–2005).

=== Argus Weekly and the Yorkshire Evening Argus ===
The Argus Weekly occupied Argus Chambers in the Britannia House building over a century ago. The Yorkshire Evening Argus and the Bradford Daily Telegraph newspapers later combined to form the Bradford Telegraph & Argus, which has occupied its present building, the former Milligan and Forbes Warehouse for some decades. "Bradford" was dropped from the title in the 1930s, when the paper's circulation area spread across much of West Yorkshire. At one time it had branch offices in nine towns across the region, as well as an office in Morecambe, the Lancashire coastal resort to which many Bradfordians went to retire. At its height the paper's daily sale exceeded 130,000. It is now about one tenth of that figure. Thirty-six years ago a new wing with a skin of dark glass was added to house the printing presses, and these machines can be seen through the windows from the street. However, they are no longer to be seen working, since the newspaper further reduced it economic connection with the city in November 2014 by moving its printing operation to Middlesbrough, in Teesside, while making its Bradford press room staff redundant. (Note: Information from staff of T&A.) Much of the newspaper's advertising content is now typeset in India.

There are plans to sell the building itself now that the presses have been sold off piecemeal. Thus it is no longer technically a Bradford newspaper.

=== 1936 Abdication Crisis ===
On 1 December 1936, it was reporter Ronald Harker from the Telegraph and Argus whose report on a speech by Bishop Alfred Blunt of Bradford casting oblique doubt on the piety of King Edward VIII, when referred to the Press Association, sparked the public controversy surrounding the Abdication Crisis. News of Bishop Blunt's doubts also provoked contrary opinions, such as those of Darlington clergyman the Rev. Robert Anderson Jardine, who subsequently conducted the wedding service of the Duke of Windsor and Wallis Warfield.

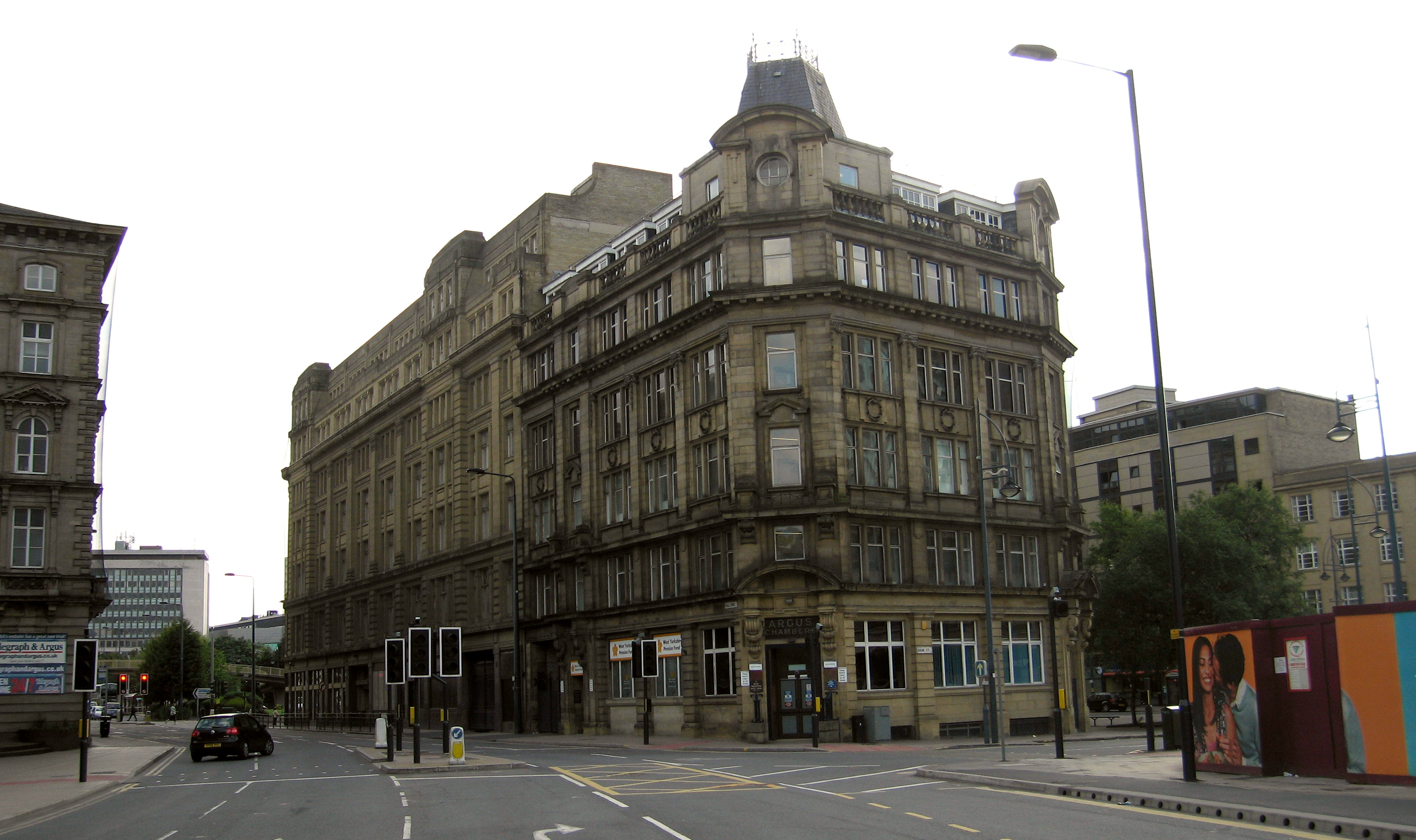
Street view from the north-east of the old Argus Weekly building, which is part of Britannia House

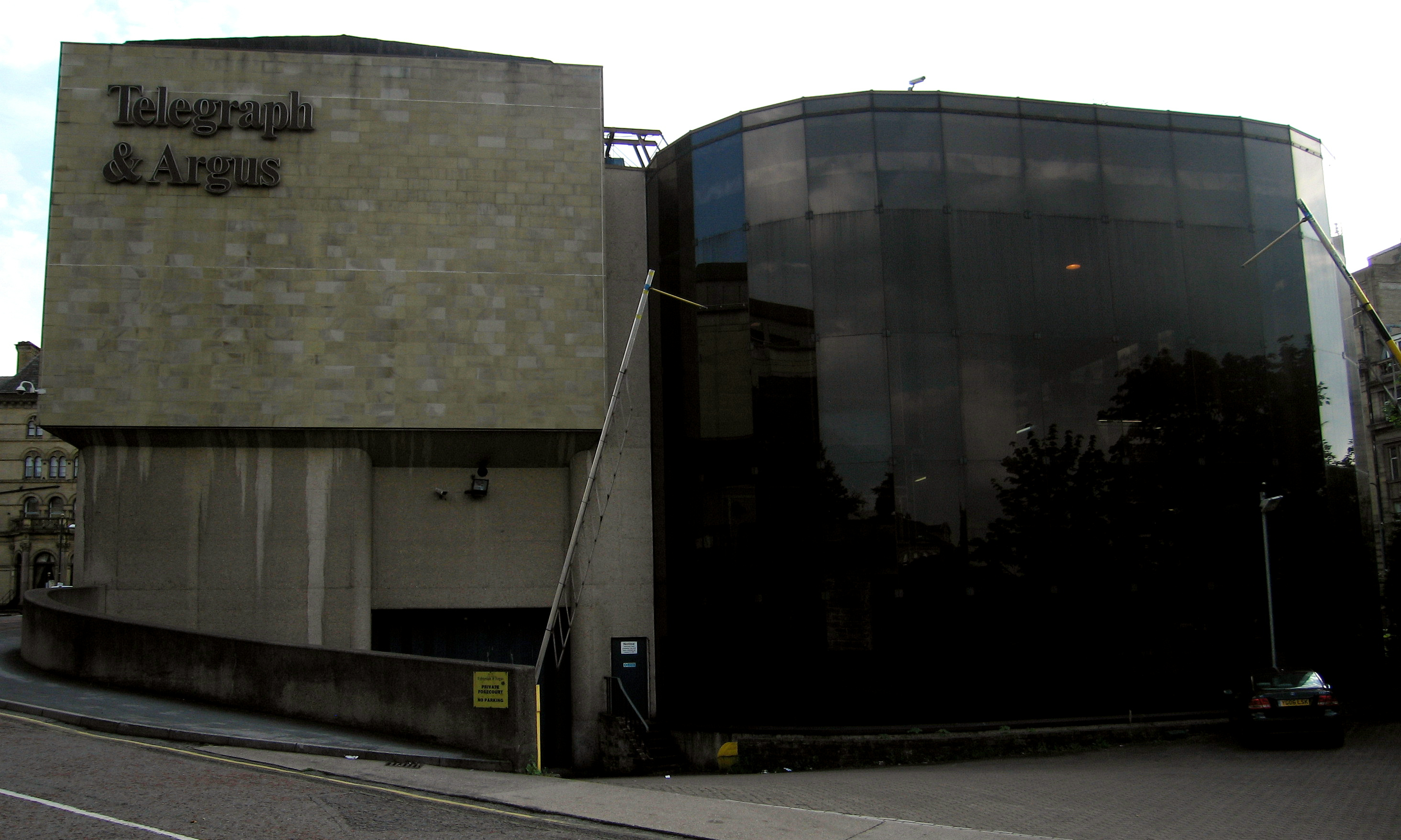
The now-disused T&A press hall, dating from the early 1980s

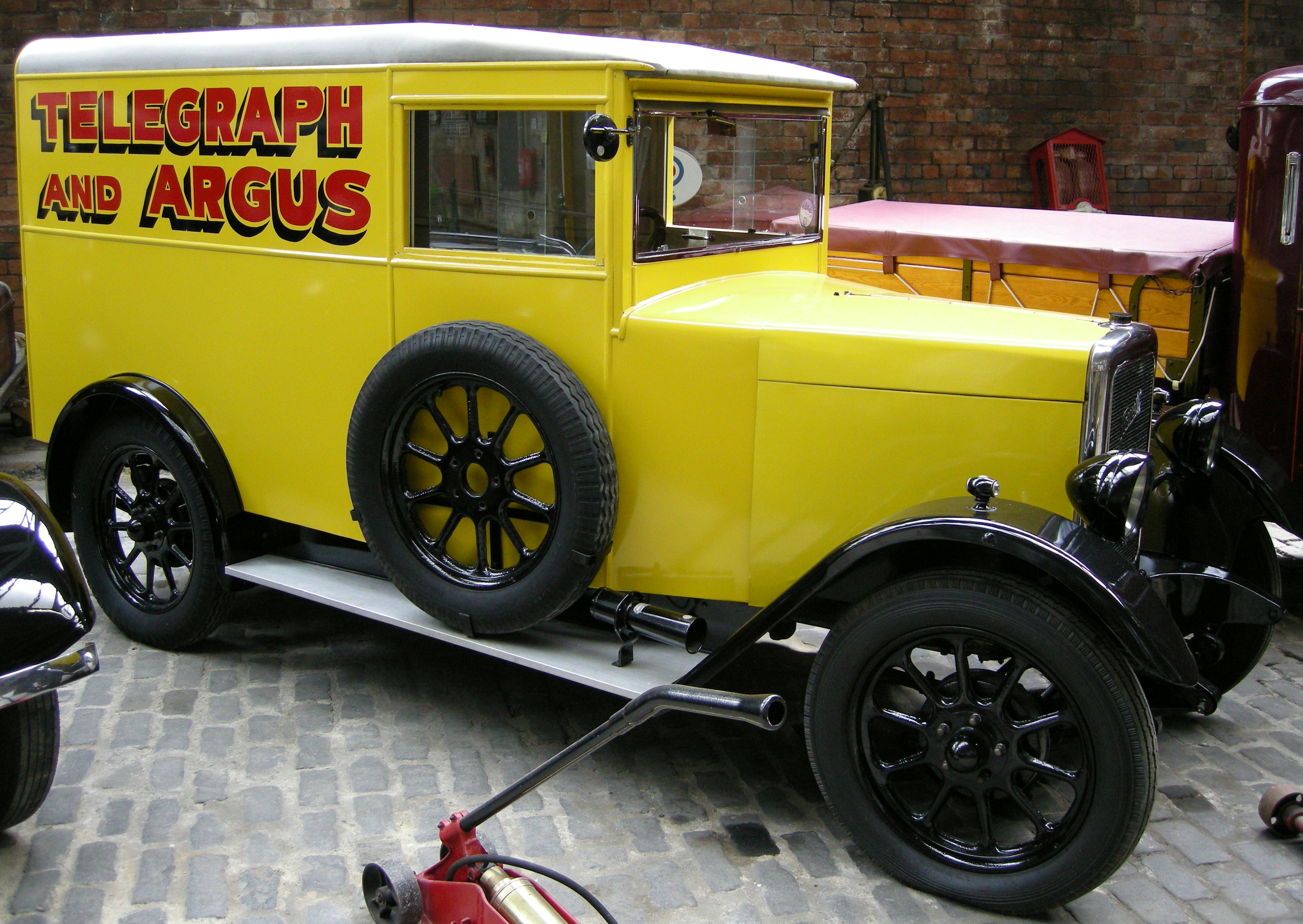
Mock-vintage T&A van

== Founding print manager ==
Jasper Patterson (1848–1927), founding compositor (print manager) for the Bradford Daily Telegraph (first printing was 16 July 1868), later, after Shields' death, left the Telegraph to found his own newspaper, the Bradford Daily Argus LCCN sn88-88279, which ran from 16 June 1892, to 15 July 1923.

== Former journalists ==
- David Barnett, journalist and author
- Lucy Ward, journalist and author
- Geoff Mellor (1920–99) Writer and showbusiness historian
- Celia Barlow, former BBC Assistant Intake Editor, former Labour MP Hove and Portslade.
- Ian Richard Hargreaves, CBE (born 1951), journalist with the Telegraph & Argus from 1974–1976

== Editors ==
1926: Bradford Daily Telegraph
- 1868–1892: William McKinlay (abt. 1841–1892)
- 1917–1918: Arthur Brown Kay (1884–1956)
- 1919–1920: Robert Garner (Abt. 1888–1958)
1926: Bradford Telegraph & Argus
- 1921–1936: William Fleming (died 1939)
1947: Telegraph & Argus
- 1936–1962: Oliffe Briant Stokes (1898–1971) (26 years)
- 1963–1967: Charles H. Leach
- 1967–1973: Peter Winston Harland (1934–2005)
- 1973–1984: Arnold Hadwin (1929–2011)
- 1984–1989: Terry Quinn (né Terence James Quinn; born 1951)
- 1989–1992: Mike Glover
- 1992–2017: Perry Austin-Clarke, the paper's longest-serving editor (25 years)
- 2017–Present: Nigel Burton

== See also ==
- Bishop Alfred Blunt § Speech and abdication crisis

== Bibliography ==
=== References ===
==== Secondary ====
- Audit Bureau of Circulations (17 February 2025). "Bradford – Telegraph & Argus". Archived from the original on 24 April 2025.

==== Tertiary ====
- "Hargreaves, Ian Richard". Who's Who 1997. Vol. 149. London: A & C Black. 1997. p. 845. ISBN 978-0-7136-4495-1 – via Internet Archive. ISBN 0-7136-4495-8, 978-0-7136-4495-1; OCLC 36267210 (all editions).
- Who Was Who in America – With World Notables. Vol. 25. New Providence, New Jersey: Marquis Who's Who. 2013–2014.

ISSN 0146-8081
ISBN 978-0-8379-0299-9 (27-Vol. set)
ISBN 978-0-8379-0296-8 (Vol. 25)
ISBN 978-0-8379-0297-5 (Index Vol.)
ISBN 978-0-8379-0298-2 (Vol. 25 & Index Vol.)

1. "Harland, Peter Winston. Marquis Who's Who. 1894. p. 99 – via Internet Archive (Kahle/Austin Foundation; Cal Poly Humboldt; withdrawn).

==== Primary ====
- Bradford Daily Telegraph (21 January 1892). "Death of Mr. W. McKinlay". Vol. 49 (24th year), no. 7295. p. 4 (column 4) – via Newspapers.com.
- Telegraph & Argus.
1. "Long Line of Editors Who Left Their Mark". 120 Year Anniversary Special. 3 August 1988. p. 5.
2. "We've lost a showbiz legend". 5 October 1999. Archived from the original on 25 July 2024.
3. Contact Page (blog). 2017.
4. Burton, Nigel (16 July 2018). A Dream Come True: How the T&A Began (blog). Archived from the original on 28 June 2022.
5. Journalists (blog). 2019.
6. Barnett, David (13 May 2021). "You Read It Here First!". Telegraph and Argus (blog ed.). Archived from the original on 29 October 2021.
7. Site Map (blog). 2025.
