= Bradford (constituency) =

Parliamentary constituency in the United Kingdom, 1832–1885

- Former borough constituency for the House of Commons
- County: West Riding of Yorkshire
- Major settlements: Bradford

1832–1885
- Seats: Two
- Created from: Yorkshire
- Replaced by: Bradford Central; Bradford East; Bradford West

Bradford was a parliamentary constituency in Bradford, in the West Riding of Yorkshire.

It returned two Members of Parliament (MPs) to the House of Commons of the Parliament of the United Kingdom from 1832 until it was abolished for the 1885 general election.

It was then split into three new constituencies: Bradford Central, Bradford East, and Bradford West.

== Boundaries ==
The constituency was based upon the town of Bradford, in the West Riding of Yorkshire. It was enfranchised as a two-member parliamentary borough from 1832. Before 1832 the area was only represented as part of the county constituency of Yorkshire. After 1832 the non-resident Forty Shilling Freeholders of the area continued to qualify for a county vote (initially in the West Riding of Yorkshire seat, and from 1865 in a division of the West Riding).

Bradford, as a new parliamentary borough, had no voters enfranchised under the ancient rights preserved by the Reform Act 1832. All voters qualified under the new uniform, borough householder franchise.

The area was incorporated as a municipal borough in 1847, covering the parishes of Bradford, Horton and Manningham. Bradford was expanded in 1882 to include Allerton, Bolton, Bowling, Heaton, Thornbury and Tyersall. However the parliamentary boundaries were not affected until the redistribution of 1885.

After the expanded borough was divided into three single member seats in 1885, Bradford became a county borough with the passing of the Local Government Act 1888. The county borough was granted city status by Letters Patent in 1897.

== Members of Parliament ==
Two MPs were elected at each general election. The table below shows the election years in which one or both of the MPs changed.

Election	First member	First party	Second member	Second party
1832	Ellis Cunliffe Lister	Whig	John Hardy	Whig
1835	Ellis Cunliffe Lister	Whig	John Hardy	Conservative
1837	Ellis Cunliffe Lister	Whig	William Busfield	Whig
1841	John Hardy	Conservative	William Cunliffe Lister	Whig
1841 by-election	John Hardy	Conservative	William Busfield	Whig
1847	Thomas Perronet Thompson	Radical	William Busfield	Whig
1851 by-election	Thomas Perronet Thompson	Radical	Robert Milligan	Whig
1852	Henry Wickham Wickham	Conservative	Robert Milligan	Whig
1857	Henry Wickham Wickham	Peelite	Thomas Perronet Thompson	Radical
1859	Henry Wickham Wickham	Liberal	Titus Salt	Liberal
1861 by-election	Henry Wickham Wickham	Liberal	William Edward Forster	Liberal
1867 by-election	Matthew William Thompson	Liberal	William Edward Forster	Liberal
1868	Henry Ripley	Liberal	William Edward Forster	Liberal
1869 by-election	Edward Miall	Liberal	William Edward Forster	Liberal
1874	Henry Ripley	Conservative	William Edward Forster	Liberal
1880	Alfred Illingworth	Liberal	William Edward Forster	Liberal
1885	constituency divided: see Bradford Central, Bradford East, and Bradford West			

== Elections ==
1830s – 1840s – 1850s – 1860s – 1870s – 1880s – References

=== Elections in the 1830s ===
1837 general election: Bradford
Party	Candidate	Votes	%	±%
Whig	Ellis Cunliffe Lister	635	30.5	−6.5
Whig	William Busfield	621	29.8	+5.2
Conservative	John Hardy	443	21.3	+2.1
Conservative	William Busfeild	383	18.4	−0.8
Majority		178	8.5	N/A
Turnout		1,060	78.7	−4.0
Registered electors		1,347		
Whig hold		Swing	−3.6	
Whig gain from Conservative		Swing	+2.3	

1835 general election: Bradford
Party	Candidate	Votes	%	±%
Conservative	John Hardy	611	38.4	+12.0
Whig	Ellis Cunliffe Lister	589	37.0	−5.7
Whig	George Hadfield	392	24.6	−6.3
Majority		219	13.8	N/A
Turnout		1,013	82.7	−2.2
Registered electors		1,225		
Conservative gain from Whig		Swing	+12.0	
Whig hold		Swing	−5.9	

1832 general election: Bradford
Party	Candidate	Votes	%	±%
Whig	Ellis Cunliffe Lister	650	42.7	N/A
Whig	John Hardy	471	30.9	N/A
Tory	George Banks (politician)	402	26.4	N/A
Majority		69	4.5	N/A
Turnout		967	84.9	N/A
Registered electors		1,139		
Whig win (new seat)				
Whig win (new seat)				

Back to Elections

=== Elections in the 1840s ===
1847 general election: Bradford
Party	Candidate	Votes	%	±%
Whig	William Busfeild	937	26.5	−37.3
Radical	Thomas Perronet Thompson	926	26.2	N/A
Conservative	Henry Wickham Wickham	860	24.3	+6.1
Conservative	Gathorne Hardy	812	23.0	+4.8
Turnout		1,768 (est)	84.9 (est)	+3.1
Registered electors		2,083		
Majority		77	2.2	
Whig hold		Swing	−24.1	
Majority		116	3.2	N/A
Radical gain from Conservative		Swing	N/A	

By-election, 16 September 1841: Bradford
Party	Candidate	Votes	%	±%
Whig	William Busfeild	526	50.2	−13.6
Conservative	William Wilberforce	522	49.8	+13.5
Majority		4	0.4	N/A
Turnout		1,048	75.0	−6.8
Registered electors		1,398		
Whig hold		Swing	−13.6	

- Caused by Lister's death

1841 general election: Bradford
Party	Candidate	Votes	%	±%
Conservative	John Hardy	612	36.3	−3.4
Whig	William Cunliffe Lister	540	32.0	+1.5
Whig	William Busfeild	536	31.8	+2.0
Majority		76	4.5	N/A
Turnout		1,144	81.8	+3.1
Registered electors		1,398		
Conservative gain from Whig		Swing	−3.5	
Whig hold		Swing	+1.6	

Back to Elections

=== Elections in the 1850s ===
1859 general election: Bradford
Party	Candidate	Votes	%	±%
Liberal	Henry Wickham Wickham	2,076	41.3	N/A
Liberal	Titus Salt	1,727	34.3	N/A
Conservative	Alfred Harris (banker)	1,229	24.4	N/A
Majority		498	9.9	N/A
Turnout		3,131 (est)	87.0 (est)	N/A
Registered electors		3,599		
Liberal hold		Swing	N/A	
Liberal hold		Swing	N/A	

1857 general election: Bradford
Party	Candidate	Votes	%	±%
Peelite	Henry Wickham Wickham	Unopposed		
Radical	Thomas Perronet Thompson	Unopposed		
Registered electors		3,279		
Peelite hold				
Radical gain from Whig				

1852 general election: Bradford
Party	Candidate	Votes	%	±%
Whig	Robert Milligan	1,266	35.4	+8.9
Conservative	Henry Wickham Wickham	1,159	32.4	−14.9
Radical	Thomas Perronet Thompson	1,153	32.2	+6.0
Turnout		1,789 (est)	66.7 (est)	−18.2
Registered electors		2,683		
Majority		107	3.0	+2.7
Whig hold		Swing	+8.2	
Majority		6	0.2	N/A
Conservative gain from Radical		Swing	−10.5	

By-election, 21 October 1851: Bradford
Party	Candidate	Votes	%	±%
Whig	Robert Milligan	Unopposed		
Whig hold				

- Caused by the death of Busfield.

Back to Elections

=== Elections in the 1860s ===
By-election, 12 Mar 1869: Bradford
Party	Candidate	Votes	%	±%
Liberal	Edward Miall	9,243	54.2	+22.6
Liberal	Matthew William Thompson	7,806	45.8	N/A
Majority		1,437	8.4	+6.3
Turnout		17,049	79.2	+14.7
Registered electors		21,518		
Liberal hold		Swing	N/A	

- Caused by Ripley's election at the 1868 general election being declared void.

By-election, 21 Dec 1868: Bradford
Party	Candidate	Votes	%	±%
Liberal	William Edward Forster	Unopposed		
Liberal hold				

- Caused by Forster's appointment as Vice-President of the Committee of the Privy Council for Education.

1868 general election: Bradford
Party	Candidate	Votes	%	±%
Liberal	William Edward Forster	9,646	34.7	N/A
Liberal	Henry Ripley	9,347	33.7	N/A
Liberal	Edward Miall	8,768	31.6	N/A
Majority		579	2.1	N/A
Turnout		13,881 (est)	64.5 (est)	N/A
Registered electors		21,518		
Liberal hold		Swing	N/A	
Liberal gain from Conservative		Swing	N/A	

By-election, 16 Oct 1867: Bradford
Party	Candidate	Votes	%	±%
Liberal	Matthew William Thompson	2,210	55.0	N/A
Liberal	Edward Miall	1,807	45.0	N/A
Majority		403	10.0	N/A
Turnout		4,017	77.4	N/A
Registered electors		5,189		
Liberal gain from Conservative		Swing	N/A	

- Caused by Wickham's death.

1865 general election: Bradford
Party	Candidate	Votes	%	±%
Liberal	William Edward Forster	Unopposed		
Conservative	Henry Wickham Wickham	Unopposed		
Registered electors		5,189		
Liberal hold				
Conservative gain from Liberal				

By-election, 11 Feb 1861: Bradford
Party	Candidate	Votes	%	±%
Liberal	William Edward Forster	Unopposed		
Liberal hold				

- Caused by Salt's resignation.

Back to Elections

=== Elections in the 1870s ===
1874 general election: Bradford
Party	Candidate	Votes	%	±%
Liberal	William Edward Forster	11,945	30.9	−3.8
Conservative	Henry Ripley	10,223	26.4	−7.3
Liberal	John Venimore Godwin	8,398	21.7	−9.9
Lib-Lab	James Hardaker	8,115	21.0	N/A
Turnout		19,341 (est)	79.5 (est)	+15.0
Registered electors		24,331		
Majority		1,722	4.5	+2.4
Liberal hold		Swing	−0.1	
Majority		1,825	4.7	N/A
Conservative gain from Liberal		Swing	+3.1	

Back to Elections

=== Elections in the 1880s ===
By-election, 8 May 1880: Bradford
Party	Candidate	Votes	%	±%
Liberal	William Edward Forster	Unopposed		
Liberal hold				

- Caused by Forster's appointment as Chief Secretary to the Lord Lieutenant of Ireland.

1880 general election: Bradford
Party	Candidate	Votes	%	±%
Liberal	William Edward Forster	14,245	39.4	+8.5
Liberal	Alfred Illingworth	12,922	35.7	+14.0
Conservative	Henry Ripley	9,018	24.9	−1.5
Majority		3,904	10.8	N/A
Turnout		23,263 (est)	86.0 (est)	+6.5
Registered electors		27,049		
Liberal hold		Swing	+4.6	
Liberal gain from Conservative		Swing	+7.4	

Back to Elections
