= William Tidd =

William Tidd (1760–1847) was a legal writer and lawyer who practiced as a special pleader.

== Life ==
William Tidd was the second son of Julius Tidd, a merchant of the London parish of St Andrew, Holborn. He was admitted to the society of the Inner Temple on 6 June 1782, and was called to the bar on 26 November 1813, after having practised as a special pleader for upwards of thirty years. Among his pupils he numbered three who became lord chancellors—Lyndhurst, Cottenham, and Campbell—and Lord Chief Justice Denman.

Tidd died on 14 February 1847 in Walcot Place, Lambeth, and was buried at Tillington in Sussex. By his wife Elizabeth he left ten children. She survived him a few months, dying on 21 October 1847. Tidd bequeathed the copyright of the "Practice" to Edward Hobson Vitruvius Lawes, serjeant-at-law.

== Works ==
Tidd mostly known for his "Practice of the Court of King's Bench" (London), the first part of which appeared in 1790 and the second in 1794. For a long period it was almost the sole authority for common-law practice. It went through nine editions, the latest appearing in 1828. Several supplements were also issued, which in 1837 were consolidated into one volume. The work was also extensively used in America, where an edition, with notes by Asa I. Fish, appeared in 1856. Tidd was favoured by the approbation of Uriah Heep:

'I am improving my legal knowledge, Master Copperfield,' said Uriah. 'I am going through Tidd's "Practice." Oh, what a writer Mr. Tidd is, Master Copperfield!' (David Copperfield, ch. xii.)

Besides the "Practice", Tidd was the author of:

- Law of Costs in Civil Actions, London, 1792; Dublin, 1793.
- Practical Forms and Entries of Proceedings in the Courts of King's Bench, Common Pleas, and Exchequer of Pleas, London, 1799; 8th ed. 1840.
- Forms of Proceedings in Replevin and Ejectment, London, 1804.
- Forms of Practical Proceedings in the Courts of King's Bench, Common Pleas, and Exchequer of Pleas. The Fifth Edition, corrected, and enlarged, London and Dublin, 1819
- The Act for Uniformity of Process in Personal Actions, London, 1833.

The last four were intended to supplement the "Practice".
