= Thomas Perronet Thompson =

British politician

Major-General Thomas Perronet Thompson FRS
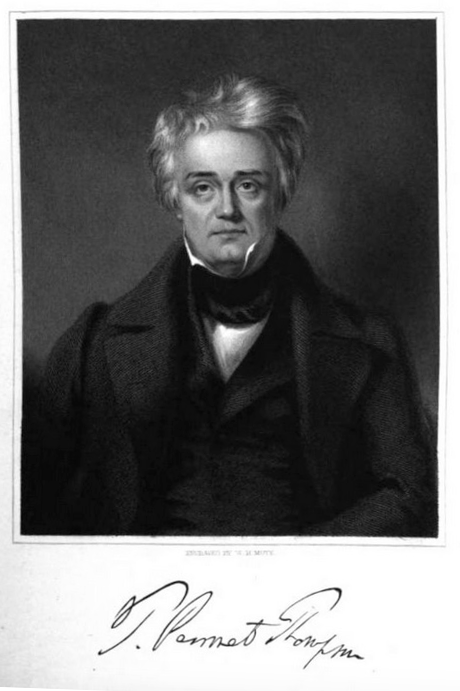
- Portrait by Sir George Hayter
- Born: 15 March 1783; Hull, East Riding of Yorkshire, England
- Died: 6 September 1869 (aged 86)

Thomas Perronet Thompson (15 March 1783 – 6 September 1869) was a British Army officer, parliamentarian, governor of Sierra Leone and radical reformer. He became prominent in the 1830s and 1840s as a leading activist in the Anti-Corn Law League. He specialized in the grass-roots mobilisation of opinion through pamphlets, newspaper articles, correspondence, speeches, and local planning meetings.

== Biography ==
Thompson was born in Kingston upon Hull in March 1783. He was son of Thomas Thompson, a banker of Hull and his wife, Philothea Perronet Briggs. The name Perronet was from his mother's grandfather, Vincent Perronet, vicar of Shoreham and a friend of John Wesley and his brother Charles Wesley. He was educated at Hull Grammar School. He was a cousin of Henry Perronet Briggs. He graduated from Queens' College, Cambridge in 1802 with the rank of seventh Wrangler. From 1803, Thompson served as a midshipman in the Royal Navy, switching to the British Army (as a lieutenant) in 1806. Thompson became Governor of Sierra Leone between August 1808 and June 1810, due in part to his acquaintance with William Wilberforce. He was recalled from the job after complaining about the system by which "freed" slaves were compulsorily "apprenticed" for fourteen years. He wrote that Wilberforce and the Sierra Leone Company had "by means of their agents become slave traders themselves". He threatened to expose this situation, so he was sacked, with Wilberforce himself agreeing to the dismissal.

In 1812, Thompson returned to his military duties, and, after serving in the south of France, was in 1819 attached as Arabic interpreter to the Persian Gulf campaign of 1819 against the Qawasim in Ras Al Khaimah, where he was responsible for the final destruction of the remains of Ras Al Khaimah in July 1820. Whilst in the Army, Thompson was promoted to major in 1825, lieutenant colonel in 1829 and in later years was made a major general. While serving in the Army in India, his second son, Charles, was born at Bombay.

As a radical reformer, Thompson wrote the True Theory of Rent and A Catechism on the Corn Laws. He also joint-owned the Westminster Review for a time. He wrote several articles in the journal supporting universal suffrage, and his articles were republished in 1842 in six volumes.

Thompson represented Kingston upon Hull in the House of Commons from 1835 to 1837 and was elected to represent Bradford between 1847 and 1852, and again from 1857 to 1859.

Thompson died in September 1869 aged 86. Monuments to his second son General Charles William Thompson, his youngest son Lieutenant Colonel John Wycliffe Thompson, who served in the Crimean War, and his youngest daughter Anne Elise are in the chancel of St Mary's Church, Cottingham, near Hull.

== Personal life ==
Thompson married Anne Elizabeth [Nancy] Barker; they had three sons, Thomas Perronet Edward, Charles William, and John Wycliffe.

Thompson's family also included his granddaughters, the historian Edith Thompson, and Elizabeth Thompson, who were both prolific contributors to the Oxford English Dictionary.

Thompson was interested in music, writing books on harmony and just intonation e.g. for the guitar (Instructions to my daughter for playing on the enharmonic guitar). His mathematical publications were somewhat eccentric. He published a Theory of Parallels in 1844, and was also the author of Geometry without Axioms, in which he endeavoured to "get rid of" axioms.

Thompson was teetotal and a vegetarian.

== Notes ==
Preceded by Thomas Ludlam	Governor of Sierra Leone; 21 July 1808 – 12 February 1810	Succeeded by Edward H. Columbine
Parliament of the United Kingdom
Preceded by David Carruthers and William Hutt	Member of Parliament for Kingston upon Hull; 1835–1837; With: William Hutt	Succeeded by Sir Walter Charles James and William Wilberforce
Preceded by John Hardy and William Busfield	Member of Parliament for Bradford; 1846–1852; With: William Busfield, to 1851; Robert Milligan, from 1851	Succeeded by Henry Wickham Wickham and Robert Milligan
