= Henry Ripley =

British businessman, philanthropist and politician

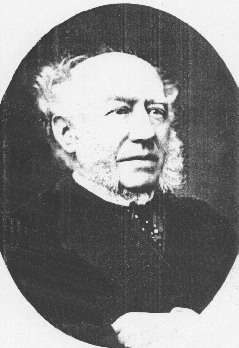
Sir Henry William Ripley

Sir Henry William Ripley, 1st Baronet (23 April 1813 – 9 November 1882), was a British businessman, philanthropist and Liberal Party politician who switched to the Conservative Party.

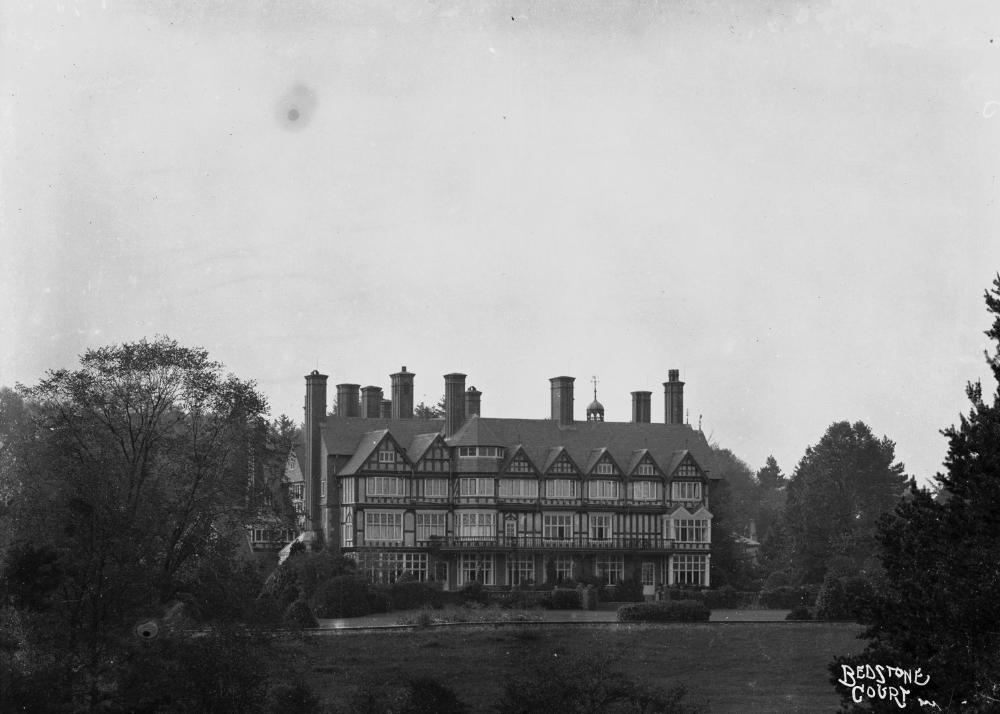
Sir Henry William Ripley's new house, Bedstone Court c. 1900

Ripley became a principal partner in Edward Ripley and Son, an important dyeing company based at Bowling Dyeworks, Bowling, Bradford established by his grandfather in about 1806.

In 1836 he married Susan Milligan of 'Acacia', Rawdon. West Yorkshire where he was living in 1881 with his family and a household of thirteen servants. In the late 1870s he bought an estate at Bedstone, Shropshire and in about 1882-4 he built a new mansion house Bedstone Court in Shropshire which became the family seat.

He was active in local politics and sat as a town councilor for the Borough of Bradford. He was also a JP, chairman of the Chamber of Commerce and took an active role in founding and running the Yorkshire Penny Bank. In 1866 he commenced construction of Ripley Ville an estate of "model houses" for the working classes. When completed it had many of the aspects of an "industrial model village" – though residents were not limited to H.W. Ripley's employees. Ripley Ville can be compared with Akroydon (Halifax, built by H.W Ripley's friend and former schoolmate Edward Akroyd) and with Saltaire

From 1868 he was also active in national politics. He was returned to Parliament for Bradford as a Liberal at the 1868 general election, but his election was overturned on petition in 1869. He was re-elected at the 1874 general election as an Independent, but was defeated at the 1880 general election when he stood as a Conservative.

In 1880 he was created a baronet, of Rawdon in the County of York and Bedstone, Shropshire. He died in November 1882, aged 69, and was succeeded as second Baronet by his eldest son Edward. His third son Frederick was created a Baronet in his own right in 1897.

A month after his death in 1882, the chimney at Newlands Mill in Bradford (owned by Sir Henry), collapsed killing 54 people, many children were among the dead. Although a jury at an inquest exonerated Sir Henry, an in depth report by the Telegraph and Argus launched a scathing attack on Sir Henry for the way the chimney was built under his instruction.

== Notes ==
Parliament of the United Kingdom
Preceded by William Edward Forster; Matthew William Thompson	Member of Parliament for Bradford; 1868 – 1869; With: William Edward Forster	Succeeded by William Edward Forster; Edward Miall
Preceded by William Edward Forster; Edward Miall	Member of Parliament for Bradford; 1874 – 1880; With: William Edward Forster	Succeeded by William Edward Forster; Alfred Illingworth
Baronetage of the United Kingdom
New creation	Baronet (of Rawdon); 1880–1882	Succeeded by Edward Ripley
