= Edward Miall =

English journalist and politician (1809–1881)

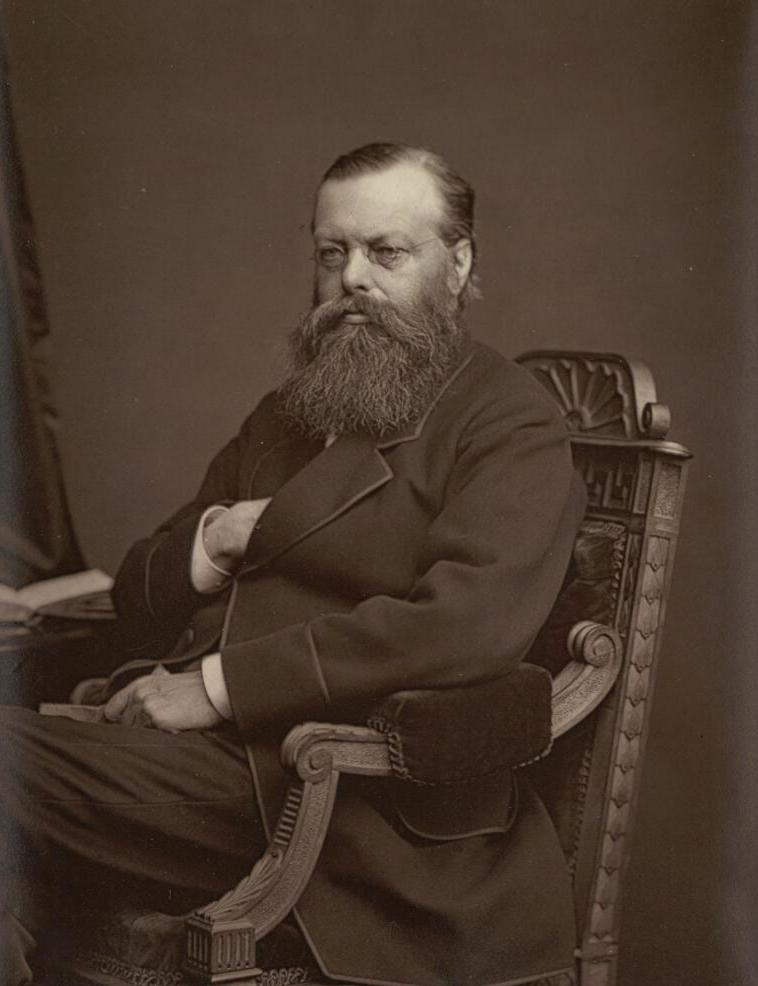

Edward Miall (8 May 1809 – 30 April 1881) was an English journalist, apostle of disestablishment, and Liberal Party politician. He founded and edited the weekly newspaper The Nonconformist. He was instrumental in the forming of the British Anti-State-Church Association, also known as the Liberation Society.

== Early life ==
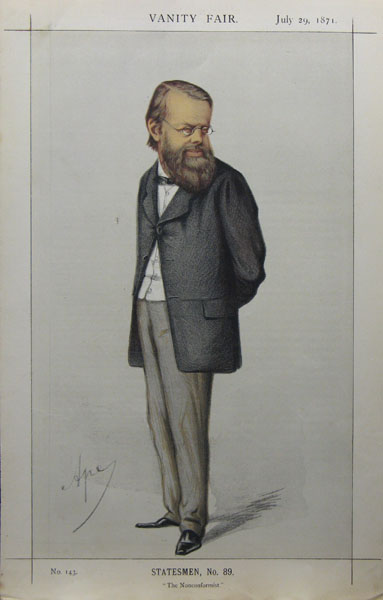
"The Nonconformist" Miall as caricatured by Ape (Carlo Pellegrini) in Vanity Fair, July 1871

Miall was born at Portsmouth to Moses Miall and his wife Sarah, daughter of George Rolph. He was educated at St. Saviour's grammar school for a while and then assisted his father in running a school. He then worked as an usher at a school in Bocking near Braintree and then in Nayland, Suffolk. He joined Wymondley Theological Institution in 1829.

== Career ==
Miall became Congregational minister at Ware, Hertfordshire in 1831 and in Leicester in 1834. In 1841, he founded The Nonconformist, a weekly newspaper in which he advocated the cause of disestablishment. Miall saw that if the programme of nonconformity was to be carried through, it must have more effective representation in Parliament.

One of the first fruits of his work was the entrance of John Bright into parliamentary life; and by 1852 forty Dissenters were members of the House of Commons. This was due largely to the efforts of the British Anti-State-Church Association which Miall was instrumental in founding in 1844; it was renamed in 1853 the Society for the Liberation of Religion from State Patronage and Control, known for short as the Liberation Society.

The Liberation Society was never able to secure a Parliamentary majority for disestablishment of the Church of England, but the long fight for the abolition of compulsory church-rates was finally successful in 1868. In 1870, Miall was prominent in the discussions aroused by the Education Bill. He was at this time Member of Parliament for Bradford (1860–1874), having previously sat for Rochdale from 1852 to 1857. In 1874 he retired from public life, and received from his admirers a present of ten thousand guineas.

== Personal life ==
Miall married Louisa, daughter of Edward Holmes of Clayhill, Enfield, in 1832 and they had two sons and three daughters. He died at Sevenoaks.

Parliament of the United Kingdom
Preceded by William Sharman Crawford	Member of Parliament for Rochdale; 1852 – 1857	Succeeded by Sir Alexander Ramsay, Bt.
Preceded by Henry William Ripley; William Edward Forster	Member of Parliament for Bradford; 1869 – 1874; With: William Edward Forster	Succeeded by Henry William Ripley; William Edward Forster
