= William Busfield =

English politician

William Busfield (1773 – 1851) was an English politician, Whig Member of Parliament for Bradford from 1837 to his death.

He was the son of Johnson Atkinson M.D. and Elizabeth Busfield, his father having taken the name Johnson Atkinson Busfield after marriage, in order to pass an estate down to his heirs. Like his father, he was a justice of the peace in the West Riding of Yorkshire. He was admitted to Queens' College, Cambridge in 1790, matriculating in 1791. Two brothers who also went to Cambridge were Johnson Atkinson and Currer Fothergill, who was the father of William Busfeild Ferrand (therefore William Busfield's nephew).

In 1837 he was elected for Bradford and in 1840 he and his fellow Bradford M.P. Ellis Cunliffe Lister attended the World Anti-Slavery Convention in London. Busfield later stood and was elected with Perronet Thompson in 1847. This was despite a lack of enthusiasm for his positions from the nonconformist vote.

He married Caroline Wood, daughter of Charles Lindley Wood, 1st Viscount Halifax.
