= 1887 Golden Jubilee Honours =

British government recognitions

The Golden Jubilee Honours for the British Empire were announced on 21 June 1887 to celebrate the Golden Jubilee of Queen Victoria on 20 June 1887.

The recipients of honours are displayed here as they were styled before their new honour, and arranged by honour, with classes (Knight, Knight Grand Cross, etc.) and then divisions (Military, Civil, etc.) as appropriate.

== Knight Bachelor ==
Awarded 5 August 1887

- Benjamin Chapman Browne, Mayor of Newcastle-upon-Tyne, D.C.L., Justice of the Peace for Gloucestershire, Northumberland, and Newcastle-on-Tyne, Member of the Institution of Civil Engineers.
- William David King, Mayor of Portsmouth.
- Henry Stephenson, Mayor of Sheffield.
- George William Edwards, Mayor of Bristol.
- Harry Bullard, of Hellesdon House, Norwich, Mayor of Norwich, Justice of the Peace for the city of Norwich, and Deputy Lieutenant for the county of Norfolk.
- James Poole, Mayor of Liverpool.
- James Farmer, of Hope House, Eccles, Lancashire, Manufacturer, Alderman and Civic mayor of Salford.
- Henry Fox Bristowe, Q.C., of the Cliffe, Nantwich, Vice-Chancellor of the County Palatine of Lancaster.
- Henry Aaron Isaacs, Alderman and Sheriff of London and Middlesex.
- Lieutenant-Colonel Alfred Kirby, of Fairlawn, New Cross, Justice of the Peace, Sheriff of London and Middlesex.
- William James Farrer, High Bailiff of Westminster.
- Arnold William White, the Queen's Solicitor

Awarded 12 August 1887

- Andrew Maclean of Partick, Chief Magistrate of Partick, NB
- George Husband Baird MacLeod, FRSE, Professor of Surgery at Glasgow University
- John Nielson Cuthbertson, chairman of the Glasgow School Board
- Henry Mitchell, JP, President of Bradford Technical College
- George Martin-Holloway of Tittenhurst, Sunninghill
- William Aitken, MD, FRS, Professor of Pathology, Army Medical School, Netley Hospital
- Warington Wilkinson Smyth, FRS, Professor of Mining in the Normal School of Science and the Royal School of Mines, Chief Inspector in the Department of Woods and Forests
- Henry Watson Parker, late President of the Incorporated Law Society
- Francis Pittis, Mayor of Newport, Isle of Wight

Awarded 22 August 1887

- James Horner Haslett, Mayor of Belfast
- Thomas Lecky, Mayor of Londonderry
- George Moyers, LL.D, Alderman of Dublin
- Henry Cochrane, D.L., Alderman of Dublin
- James Spaight, President of Chamber of Commerce, Limerick and Chairman of Waterford and Limerick Railway
- Patrick Maxwell, President of the Incorporated Law Society of Ireland
- Robert Herron, Chairman of the Kingstown Town Commissioners
- Howard Grubb, FRS

Other Knighthoods in 1887

- Morgan Morgan, Mayor of Cardiff (August 25)
- Thomas Richard Edridge, businessman and philanthropist of Croydon (August 25)
- John Henry Puleston of Denbighshire (August 25)
- Harry Thomas Alfred Rainals, Her Majesty's Consul at Brest (September 1)

== Order of the Indian Empire ==
=== Knight Grand Commander (GCIE) ===
- The Lord Reay CIE, Governor of the Presidency of Bombay.
- The Lord Connemara, Governor of the Presidency of Madras.
- General Sir Frederick Sleigh Roberts Bt GCB KCIE VC, Commander-in-Chief in India.

Extra Knights Grand Commander

- Field-Marshal the Prince of Wales KG KT GCB KP GCSI GCMG
- Vice-Admiral the Duke of Edinburgh KG KT KP GCSI GCMG KCB
- Major-General the Duke of Connaught and Strathearn KG KT KP GCSI GCMG CB
- Field-Marshal the Duke of Cambridge KG KT GCB KP GCSI GCMG

=== Knight Commander (KCIE) ===
- Dietrich Brandis

== Order of St Michael and St George ==
=== Knight Grand Cross (GCMG) ===
- Sir Edward William Stafford KCMG, formerly for many years Prime Minister of New Zealand.
- Sir Thomas Elder, for many years a Member of the Legislative Council of South Australia.

=== Knight Commander (KCMG) ===
- Edward Newton Esq CMG, late Lieutenant-Governor and Colonial Secretary of Jamaica.
- Malcolm Fraser Esq CMG, Colonial Secretary of Western Australia.
- William Henry Marsh Esq CMG, late Colonial Secretary and Auditor-General of Hong Kong.
- Sidney Godolphin Alexander Shippard Esq MA DCL CMG, Administrator and Chief Magistrate of British Bechuanaland.
- John William Akerman Esq, Speaker of the Legislative Council of Natal.
- James Alexander Grant Esq MD, of Ottawa, in the Dominion of Canada.

=== Companion (CMG) ===
- John Fitzgerald Burns Esq, Colonial Treasurer of New South Wales.
- Major-General Edward Harding Steward, Military Adviser to several of the Australasian Colonies.
- William Frederick Haynes Smith Esq, Attorney-General of British Guiana,
- Francis Fleming Esq, Colonial Secretary of Mauritius.
- James Russell Esq, Puisne Judge of the Supreme Court of Hong Kong.
- George William Robert Campbell Esq Inspector-General of Police and Prisons of Ceylon
- Captain Tolmie John Tresidder EE, for services rendered in connection with the drainage of Malta.
- Francis Richard Round Esq MA, of the Colonial Office, for special services in British Bechuanaland.

== Order of the Bath ==
=== Knight Grand Cross (GCB) ===
Honorary (Civil Division)

- Grand Duke Sergei Alexandrovich of Russia.
- The Hereditary Grand Duke of Hesse.
- The Hereditary Prince of Saxe Meiningen.
- The Khedive of Egypt.

Military Division

- Admiral Sir George Greville Wellesley KCB
- Admiral Sir Edward Gennys Fanshawe KCB
- General Sir Edward Cooper Hodge KCB
- General Sir Thomas Montagu Steele KCB
- General Sir Edwin Beaumont Johnson KCB CIE, Royal Artillery.
- General Sir Henry Wylie Norman GCMG KCB CIE, Bengal Staff Corps;

Additional Members (Military)

- Admiral Sir William Houston Stewart KCB
- Admiral Sir John Edmund Commerell VC KCB
- Lieutenant-General and Honorary General Sir Charles Lawrence D'Aguilar KCB, Royal Artillery.
- Lieutenant-General Sir Archibald Alison Bt KCB, Commanding the Division, Aldershot.
- Lieutenant-General Sir Charles Henry Brownlow KCB, Bengal Staff Corps.

Civil Division

- Honorary General Sir Henry Frederick Ponsonby KCB, Private Secretary and Equerry (Extra) to The Queen.

Additional Members (Civil)

- General Prince Edward of Saxe-Weimar KCB
- Vice-Admiral Prince Victor of Hohenlohe-Langenburg.
- Prince Louis of Battenberg KCB, Commander, Royal Navy.

=== Knight Commander (KCB) ===
Military Division

- Admiral Henry Chads.
- General James Macleod Bannatyne Fraser-Tytler CB, Bengal Staff Corps.
- Admiral Charles Farrell Hillyar CB
- General Penrose Charles Penrose CB, Royal Marine Light Infantry.
- Admiral Sir Edward Augustus Inglefield CB
- Admiral Arthur Cumming CB
- Lieutenant-General and Honorary General William Parke CB
- Admiral Sir Reginald John Macdonald KCSI
- General John Alexander Ewart CB
- Admiral Edward Bridges Rice CB
- Admiral Augustus Phillimore.
- Admiral Richard James, Earl of Clanwilliam KCMG CB
- General Charles London Barnard CB, Royal Marine Artillery.
- Lieutenant-General John Luther Vaughan CB, Bengal Staff Corps.
- Lieutenant-General Lothian Nicholson CB, Inspector-General of Fortifications.
- Major-General and Honorary Lieutenant-General Sir Henry Marshman Havelock-Allan Bt VC CB
- Lieutenant-General Robert Hume CB
- Lieutenant-General Henry D'Oyley Torrens CB, Commanding the Troops in South Africa.
- Vice-Admiral Richard Vesey Hamilton CB
- Vice-Admiral Thomas Brandreth.
- Surgeon-General John Harrie Ker Innes CB, Honorary Surgeon to The Queen.

Additional Members (Military)

- Vice-Admiral William Graham CB
- Vice-Admiral Nowell Salmon CB VC
- Major-General (Honorary) George Hutt CB
- Inspector General of Hospitals William Mackenzie MD CB CSI, Indian Medical Service, Honorary Physician to The Queen.
- Inspector-General of Hospitals and Fleets James Jenkins CB, Royal Navy.
- Major-General Martin Dillon CB CSI, Commanding a Division, Bengal.
- Major-General George Byng Harman CB, Military Secretary, Headquarters of the Army.
- Rear-Admiral George Tryon CB
- Lieutenant-Colonel and Honorary Colonel Donald Matheson CB, 1st Lanarkshire Engineer Volunteer Corps.

Civil Division

- Lieutenant-General Sir Dighton MacNaghten Probyn KCSI CB VC, Controller and Treasurer of the Household of His Royal Highness The Prince of Wales.
- Major Sir Evelyn Baring KCSI CB CIE, Agent and Consul-General in Egypt.
- Stevenson Arthur Blackwood Esq CB, Secretary, General Post Office.
- Charles Thomas Newton Esq CB, late British Museum.
- John Simon Esq CB MD, late Medical Officer, Privy Council Office.
- Hugh Owen Esq CB, Permanent Secretary, Local Government Board.
- William Fraser Esq CB LLD, Deputy Keeper of Records of Scotland.
- Charles Lister Ryan Esq CB, Assistant Comptroller and Auditor, Exchequer and Audit Department.
- Sir Edward Walter, Founder and Commanding Officer Corps of Commissionaires.
- Captain Douglas Galton CB, late Royal Engineers.
- Major Fleetwood Isham Edwards CB, Royal Engineers, Assistant Keeper of the Privy Purse and Assistant Private Secretary to The Queen.

Additional Members (Civil)

- Arthur Mitchell Esq CB MD LLD, Commissioner in Lunacy in Scotland.
- Colonel George Ashley Maude CB, Crown Equerry.
- Colonel Walter Rice Olivey CB, Chief Paymaster, Army Pay Department.

=== Companion (CB) ===
Military Division

- Lieutenant-General Richard George Amherst Luard.
- Lieutenant-General Eyre Challoner Henry, Lord Clarina.
- Lieutenant-General John Cockburn Hood, Bengal Staff Corps.
- Lieutenant-General George Tomkyns Chesney CSI CIE, Royal Engineers.
- Major-General Charles Frederick Torrens Daniell, Commanding the Troops, Northern District.
- Inspector-General of Hospitals and Fleets James Nicholas Dick, Royal Navy.
- Major-General George Crommelin Hankin, Bengal Staff Corps.
- Major-General Somerset Molyneux Wiseman-Clarke, Commanding the Troops, Belfast District.
- Major-General Robert John Hay, Royal Artillery, Governor Royal Military Academy.
- Rear-Admiral Alfred John Chatfield.
- Major-General George Forbes Hogg, Bombay Staff Corps.
- Major-General Frederick Roome, Bombay Staff Corps.
- Major-General Howard Codrington Dowker, Madras Staff Corps.
- Major-General William Godfrey Dunham Massy.
- Surgeon-General Herbert Taylor Reade VC, Medical Staff.
- Major-General William Bannerman, Bombay Staff Corps.
- Major-General Godfrey Clerk, Deputy Adjutant-General to the Forces.
- Captain Edward Hobart Seymour, Royal Navy, Aide-de-Camp to The Queen.
- Captain Edmund St. John Garforth, Royal Navy.
- Lieutenant-Colonel and Colonel William John Chads.
- Lieutenant-Colonel and Colonel Thomas William West Pierce, Bombay Staff Corps,
- Captain Arthur Thomas Brooke, Royal Navy.
- Lieutenant-Colonel and Colonel Adolphus Haggerston Stephens, half-pay.
- Captain Arthur Knyvet Wilson VC, Royal Navy.
- Colonel Cecil Brooke Le Mesurier, Royal Artillery.
- Lieutenant-Colonel and Colonel Henry Blundell-Hollinshead-Blundell, half-pay.
- Captain John William Brackenbury CMG, Royal Navy.
- Lieutenant-Colonel and Colonel Arthur Thomas Moore VC, Bombay Staff Corps.
- Lieutenant-Colonel and Colonel John Sidney Hand, half-pay.
- Lieutenant-Colonel and Colonel George Carr Hodding, Madras Staff Corps.
- Colonel Eardley Maitland, Royal Artillery, Superintendent, Royal Gun Factory, Woolwich.
- Lieutenant-Colonel and Colonel Fitzroy William Fremantle, Regimental District.
- Lieutenant-Colonel and Colonel (temporary Major-General) Henry James Alderson half-pay, Royal Artillery, Director of Artillery and Stores, War Office.
- Deputy Surgeon-General Jeffery Allen Marston MD, Medical Staff.
- Lieutenant-Colonel and Colonel Aubrey Harvey Tucker, Eegimental District.
- Lieutenant-Colonel and Colonel John Worthy Chaplin VC, half-pay.
- Lieutenant-Colonel and Colonel Benjamin Williams, Bengal Staff Corps.
- Lieutenant-Colonel and Colonel Robert Byng Patricia Price Campbell, Bengal Staff Corps.
- Lieutenant-Colonel and Colonel Augustus Charles Twentyman, half-pay
- Lieutenant-Colonel and Colonel Charles Walker Robinson, half-pay, Assistant Adjutant and Quartermaster-General, Aldershot.
- Lieutenant-Colonel and Colonel Frederick Amelius Ogle, Royal Marine Artillery.
- Lieutenant-Colonel George Harry Thorn Colwell, Royal Marine Light Infantry.

Additional Members

- Lieutenant-Colonel and Colonel George Stewart, Bengal Staff Corps.
- Lieutenant-Colonel and Colonel Alexander George Ross, Bengal Staff Corps.
- Lieutenant-Colonel and Colonel Kennett Gregg Henderson, half-pay.
- Colonel Hugh Pearce Pearson, Regimental District.
- Lieutenant-Colonel and Colonel Frederick Hammond, Bengal Staff Corps.
- Lieutenant - Colonel and Colonel Eustace Beaumont Burnaby, the King's Own (Yorkshire Light Infantry).
- Lieutenant-Colonel and Colonel Charles Richard Pennington, Bengal Staff Corps.
- Lieutenant-Colonel and Colonel Arthur Chichester William Crookshank, Bengal Staff Corps.
- Lieutenant-Colonel and Colonel Charles Wolfran Nugent Guinness, Seaforth Highlanders (Ross-shire Buffs, The Duke of Albany's),
- Lieutenant-Colonel and Colonel Matthew William Edward Gosset, the Dorsetshire Regiment.
- Lieutenant-Colonel and Colonel George Armand Furse, half-pay, Assistant Adjutant and Quartermaster-General, Southern District.
- Deputy Commissary-General and Honorary Colonel Emilius Hughes CMG, Commissariat and Transport Staff.
- Major and Colonel Coleridge Grove, the East Yorkshire Regiment.
- Lieutenant-Colonel and Colonel John Crosland Hay, the Gordon Highlanders.
- Lieutenant-Colonel and Colonel William Yesey Brownlow, Assistant Commandant and Superintendent Riding Establishment, Cavalry Depot.
- Deputy Commissary - General and Honorary Colonel Clifford Elliott Walton, Commissariat and Transport Staff,
- Lieutenant-Colonel Edward Long Grant, Madras Invalid Establishment.
- Assistant Commissary-General of Ordnance and Honorary Lieutenant-Colonel Herbert James Mills, Ordnance Store Department.
- Lieutenant-Colonel Commandant and Honorary Colonel Charles John Reed, 3rd Brigade, Northern Division, Royal Artillery.
- Lieutenant-Colonel Commandant and Honorary Colonel Charles Thomas John Moore, 4th Battalion, the Lincolnshire Regiment.
- Lieutenant-Colonel Commandant and Honorary Colonel Thomas Coningsby Norbury Norbury, 3rd and 4th Battalions, the Worcestershire Eegiment.
- Lieutenant-Colonel and Honorary Colonel John Scott, 1st Renfrew and Dumbarton Artillery Volunteer Corps.
- Lieutenant-Colonel David Gamble, 2nd Volunteer Battalion, the Prince of Wales's Volunteers, South Lancashire Regiment.
- Lieutenant-Colonel and Honorary Colonel Henry Acland Fownes Luttrell, 3rd Volunteer Battalion, the Prince Albert's (Somersetshire Light Infantry),
- Lieutenant-Colonel and Honorary Colonel Walter Spencer Stanhope, 2nd Volunteer Battalion, the York and Lancaster Regiment.
- Lieutenant-Colonel and Honorary Colonel Sir William Henry Humphery Bt, 1st Volunteer Battalion, the Hampshire Regiment.
- Lieutenant-Colonel and Honorary Colonel Henry Eyre, 4th (Nottinghamshire) Volunteer Battalion, the Sherwood Foresters (Derbyshire Regiment).
- Lieutenant-Colonel Commandant and Honorary Colonel Robert Peter Laurie, 3rd London Rifle Volunteer Corps.
- Lieutenant-Colonel and Honorary Colonel John Lowther du Plat Taylor, 24th Middlesex Rifle Volunteer Corps.

Civil Division

- Godfrey Lushington Esq, Under-Secretary of State, Home Office.
- The Earl of Iddesleigh, Deputy Chairman, Board of Inland Revenue.
- John Molmeux Esq, Chief Inspector (Excise), Inland Revenue.
- William Henry Cousins Esq, Secretary (Stamps and Taxes), Inland Revenue.
- Algernon Turner Esq, Financial Secretary, General Post Office.
- Samuel Seldon Esq, Principal of the Statistical Department, Board of Customs.
- Alexander John Finlaison Esq, Actuary, National Debt Office.
- Samuel Usher Roberts Esq, Commissioner, Board of Works, Ireland.
- John Malcolm Ludlow Esq, Barrister-at-Law and Chief Registrar of Friendly Societies.
- Professor William Henry Flower LLD FRS, Director, Natural History Department, British Museum.
- Charles George Barrington Esq, Auditor of the Civil List and Assistant Secretary, Treasury; and Gentleman Usher of the Red Rod, Order of the Bath.
- Carey John Knyvett Esq, Principal Clerk, Home Office.
- George Thomas Brown Esq, Professional Officer Committee of Council for Agriculture.
- Henry Longley Esq BCL, Chief Charity Commissioner for England and Wales.
- Henry George Calcraft Esq, Permanent Secretary, Committee of Privy Council for Trade.
- George John Swanston Esq, one of the Assistant Secretaries, Committee of Privy Council for Trade.
- Lieutenant-Colonel Richard Lyons Otway Pearson, one of the Assistant Commissioners Metropolitan Police.
- Colonel and Honorary Major-General Henry Schaw, late Royal Engineers, and Deputy Director of Works for Fortifications.
- Slingsby Bethell, Reading Clerk and Clerk of Outdoor Committees, House of Lords.
- Reginald Francis Douce Palgrave Esq, Clerk of the House of Commons.
- Samuel Butler Provis Esq, one of the Assistant-Secretaries, Local Government Board.
- William Cospatrick Dunbar Esq, Assistant Under Secretary, Office of Secretary for Scotland.
- John Skelton Esq LLD, Advocate, Secretary Board of Supervision, Scotland.
- Captain Antoine Sloet Butler, Divisional Magistrate in Ireland.
- Sir William Kaye QC LLD, Assistant Under Secretary for Ireland.
- Henry Craik Esq LLD, Secretary Scotch Education Department.
- Honorary General The Lord Alfred Paget, Clerk-Marshal.
- Lieutenant-General and Honorary General Henry Lynedoch Gardiner, Royal Artillery, Equerry to The Queen.
- Evan Colville Nepean Esq, Director of Army Contracts, War Office.
- George West Esq, late Her Majesty's Consul, Suez.
- Robert William Arbuthnot Holmes Esq MA, Treasury Remembrancer in Ireland.
- Frederic Holmwood Esq, Her Majesty's Consul, Zanzibar.
- Principal Veterinary Surgeon George Fleming, Headquarters Staff of the Army.
