= William Willis Wood =

William Willis Wood may refer to:

- William W. Wood, engineer of the United States Navy
- William Willis Wood (mayor), English mill owner, Wesleyan Methodist preacher and mayor of Bradford, Yorkshire
