= John Hill (mayor) =

English magistrate, alderman, mayor, and textile manufacturer

John Hill JP
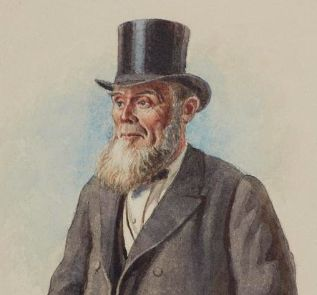
- Detail of a John Hill portrait (1889) by John Sowden
- Born: January 5, 1829
- Died: August 5, 1909 (aged 80); Lightcliffe, Calderdale, West Yorkshire, England
- Occupation(s): magistrate, alderman, mayor, textile manufacturer
- Known for: Mayor of Bradford

John Hill JP (1829–1909) was a magistrate, mayor of the city of Bradford, and textile manufacturer.

== Life ==
Hill was born on 5 January 1829. The family moved to Bradford in 1845. John Hill started work in a factory during his teenage years and began business himself as a manufacturer in 1858, in a partnership. In 1867, he established his own business, John Hill & Sons at Apsley Mills, Great Horton, manufacturing worsted cloth, and the enterprise was successful. He was also involved with Salem Chapel Sunday Schools and was a church deacon. Hill was a Congregationalist and liberal. He was the district treasurer of the Yorkshire Congregational Union. He was also a lay pastor at the Denholme Independent Chapel.

John Hill was first elected as a councillor representing the West Ward on the Bradford Town Council in 1870. He was an alderman from 1877 to 1895. When on the council, he was chairman of the building and improvement committee and the finances and general purposes committee. Hill was the 24th mayor of Bradford during 1881–82. During this time in 1882, there was a visit of the Prince and Princess of Wales to open the Bradford Technical College (later to become the University of Bradford). He was also made a Justice of Peace during this period and was a member of the Bradford School Board.

Hill married and had three sons and two daughters. In retirement he lived at Perth House in the village of Lightcliffe, West Yorkshire. Hill died at the age of 80 on 5 August 1909 in Lightcliffe.

== See also ==
- List of mayors of Bradford
