= Thomas Speight =

English merchant and Mayor of Bradford

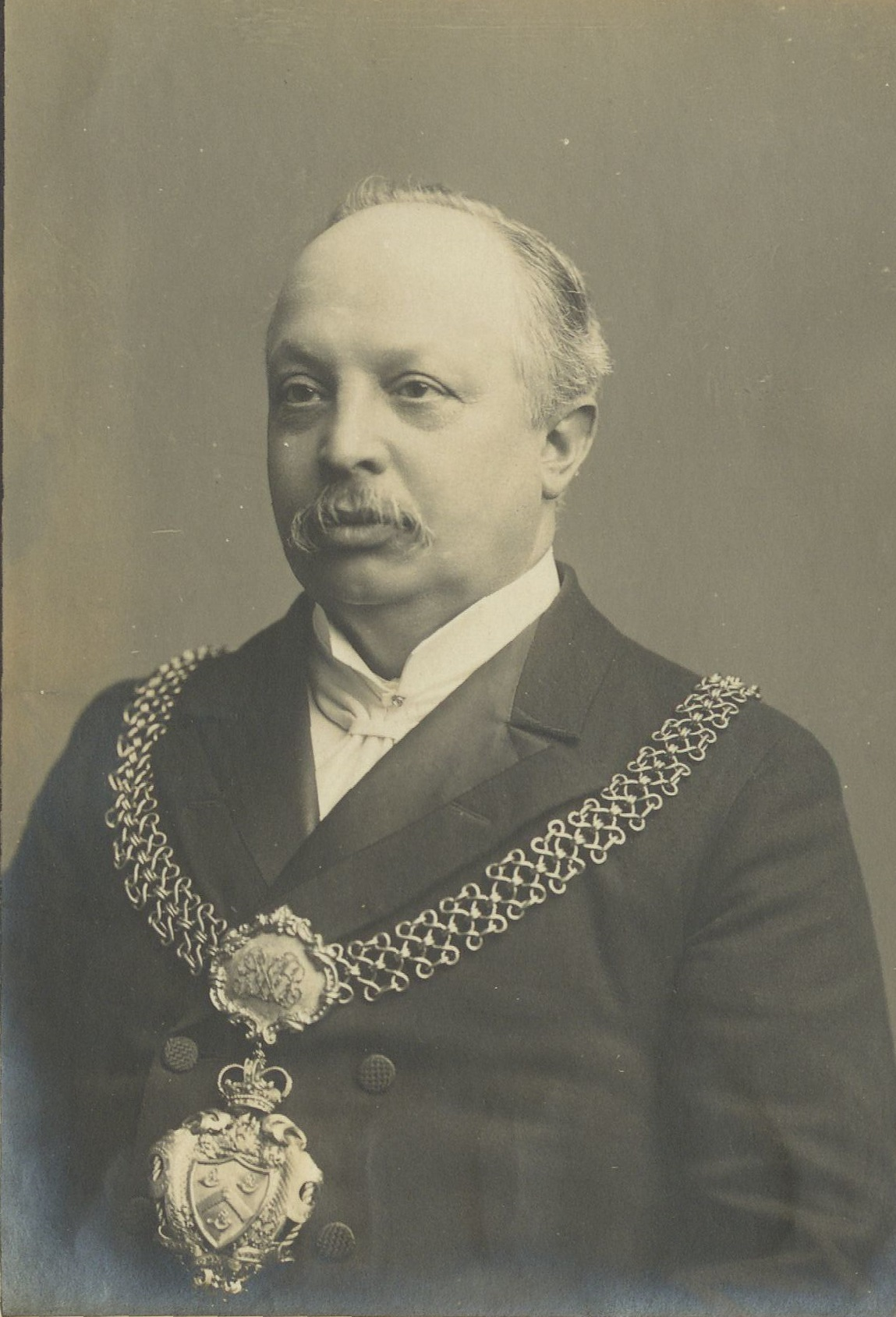
- Mayor of Bradford, 1896-98
- Born: 6 July 1844; Catterall, Lancashire, England
- Died: 25 May 1921 (aged 76); Bradford, Yorkshire, England
- Occupation(s): Mohair merchant, inventor
- Office: Mayor of Bradford (1896–1898)
- Spouse: Sarah Nicholson (m. 18 July 1866)

Thomas Speight (6 July 1844 – 25 May 1921) was owner of Thomas Speight & Co. Mohair Merchants in Bradford, Yorkshire and was Mayor of Bradford from 1896 to 1898.

== Background and Civic Life ==
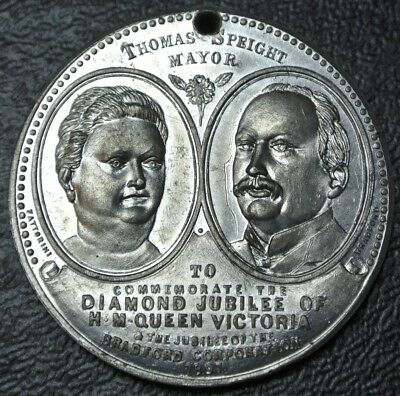
Reverse of Queen Victoria Silver Jubilee Medal

Thomas Speight was born in Catterall, Lancashire, England on 6 July 1844. He was a successful inventor and businessman and became the owner of Thomas Speight & Co. Mohair Merchants in Bradford, Yorkshire and built a large factory, the Burlington Works, in Thornbury. In 1986, Councillor Thomas Speight was a director of the Peoples Palace theater on Manchester Road. In 1894, at age 50, he turned his hand to civic affairs and represented Bradford Moor Ward. Two years later, in November 1896, Thomas Speight was elected Mayor of Bradford and served until November 1898. In 1897, he presided over the celebrations occasioned by the 50th anniversary (golden jubilee) of the incorporation of Bradford as a city and the 60th anniversary (diamond jubilee) of Queen Victoria's accession to the throne. Known as the "Jubilee Mayor", his image appears on the reverse of a commemorative medal struck for the occasion. In 1898, Speight was instrumental in establishing Cartwright Hall, an art gallery in Lister Park. Speight lived in Scarr Hall (now Bradford Moor golf club). Speight died in 1921 and is buried in Undercliffe Cemetery, Bradford. A detailed biography of Speight and his family was compiled by D. Broomfield in 2021.

Speight was preceded in office by William Willis Wood (1844–1921), who was Mayor of Bradford from 1894 to 1896.

== Personal ==
Notably, Speight's daughter, Annie, married Wood's eldest son, Arthur (1861–1905) in 1889. Their only son, Stanley Speight Wood (1889–1918), served in the Royal Army Service Corps and died in Baghdad, Iraq, in World War I.
