= Kathleen Chambers =

English politician

Alderman Kathleen Chambers CBE.
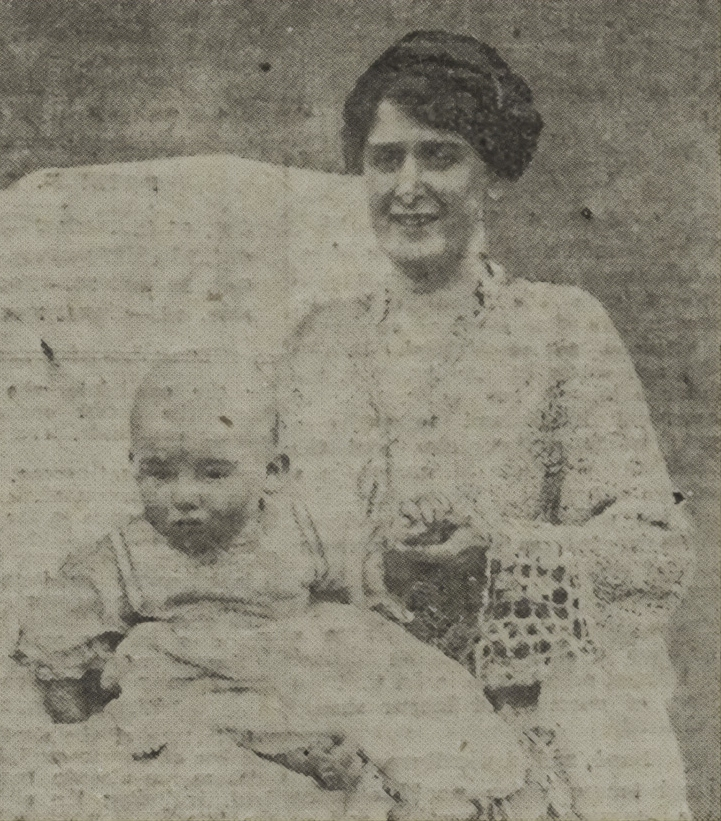
- Chambers and her son in 1924
- Born: Ethel Kathleen Mee; 28 October 1879
- Died: 15 April 1965 (aged 85)
- Other names: Ethel Kathleen Mee (1879–1898); Ethel Kathleen McLean (1898–1911); (Ethel) Kathleen Sykes (1911–1919)
- Occupation: Politician
- Known for: First female Lord Mayor of Bradford
- Office: Lord Mayor of Bradford
- Term: 1945–1946
- Spouses: James McLean (m. 1898; died 1904) Terrence Percy Sykes (m. 1911; died 1919) William Chambers (m. 1922; died 1947)

Kathleen Chambers CBE (born Ethel Kathleen Mee, 28 October 1879 – 15 April 1965) was a pioneer female politician who was the first woman to be Lord Mayor of Bradford holding that position in 1945–1946.

== Early life ==
Chambers was born in Leeds in 1879, the third daughter of Thomas Mee and Ellen Mee (née Bland). Her father died in 1891 and she was raised by her guardian, Conservative MP, Ernest Gray in London where she became his private secretary. She became disenchanted with the Conservative party over the party's stance on women's suffrage and after meeting teacher and union official T. P. Sykes she began to support socialist causes. She and Sykes married in December 1911 and she moved with him to Bradford where he was headmaster of Great Horton Elementary School. In 1919 Mr Sykes was elected as a Labour councillor to the West Riding County Council but died only a few weeks later. Chambers was adopted as Labour's candidate in the ensuing by-election but lost the contest.

== Bradford political career ==
The following year, 1920, Chambers was adopted as Labour candidate for the South ward in the elections for Bradford City Council but was defeated. Adopted as Labour candidate for the same ward in the 1921 municipal election, Chambers was this time successful and became one of the first woman to be elected to Bradford City Council and the first to win a full election. (Note: Annie Arnold was elected unopposed to the council in 1918 and Jane Clayton won a by-election in 1919 but neither remained on the council in 1921.) In October 1924 she became the first female alderman of Bradford.

Re-elected in 1927, in November 1930 Chambers was nominated to be Deputy Lord Mayor of Bradford. During her tenure as Deputy Lord Mayor Chambers presided over council business for a period in March and April 1931 when the Lord Mayor, Alfred Pickles, was admitted to hospital. Chambers also recorded a speech on film in conjunction with the forthcoming Bradford Pageant.

Chambers as due for re-election in 1932 but in October 1932 announced that she was not seeking re-election due to ill-health, and had missed some engagements due to suffering from osteoarthritis. Shortly before leaving the council Chambers has been appointed as a magistrate for the Bradford area and continued to serve in this role.

Chambers remained out of office until 1937 when she stood as an unofficial Labour candidate for Manningham ward following a split in the local Labour party over the nomination of the Lord Mayor in 1936. (Note: The custom in place was that the councillors representing each party nominated one of their number to be Lord Mayor, with the three main parties taking the post of a three-year cycle. In 1936 the Bradford Labour party insisted on naming the candidate rather than leaving it to the councillors. When some Labour councillors refused to accept the party nomination, three of them were expelled from the party and in 1937 "rebel" Labour groups were formed in the wards represented by the expelled councillors in direct opposition to the official Labour party groups. Four councillors representing the "rebel" groups were elected but the matter was never really resolved with Chambers rejoining the Labour group on the council, while two of the expelled councillors joined the National Labour Organisation.)

Chambers finished second in the poll and as Manningham returned two councillors to the council she was elected to the council for two years, however the outbreak of the Second World War meant that elections were suspended by the Local Elections and Register of Electors (Temporary Provisions) Act 1939 and it was not until 1945 that Chambers had to seek re-election.

In June 1945 Chambers was the Labour nominee to be the Lord Mayor for 1945–1946 and the nomination was agreed by the other parties. Re-elected in Manningham in November 1945, Chambers was elected Lord Mayor on 10 November and also re-elected as an alderman. As her Lady Mayoress, Chamber chose her friend and fellow magistrate Martha Leach - who also happened to be the wife of Manningham's other councillor William Leach. As well as being the first woman Lord Mayor of Bradford Chambers was also the first Catholic woman to be a Lord Mayor in the United Kingdom. Her Catholicism did draw criticism when she expressed a desire for Catholics to receive the religious education they desired, with a Protestant Electors' Association being formed to counter what its members considered was a breach of the traditional neutrality of the Lord Mayor by Chambers. Chamber's term of office as Lord Mayor was unfortunately marred by the theft of the mayoral car and the mayoral chains while Chambers was on official business in Leeds. The car was recovered but the chains weren't and an appeal had to be launched to raise funds for replacements.

After her tenure as Lord Mayor, Chambers continued to serve as an alderman and was chair of the education committee for several years as well as being a member of numerous other bodies too. With the establishment of the National Health Service (NHS) Chambers served as the first chair of the NHS Bradford Executive Committee from 1947 until 1964.

== Other work ==
As well as her political Chambers was always interested in social welfare, especially concerning people with visual impairment and was deeply involved with the Royal National Institute of Blind People becoming the chair of the charity's homes committee for the north. In 1953 the RNIB named its home in Burnham-on-Sea after her and invited Chambers to make the official opening.

Chambers was invited to become a member of the Ministry of Health Welfare of the Blind Advisory Committee in 1937. Post-war Chambers was a member of the Ministry of Health Handicapped Persons Welfare Advisory Committee. Her work on these committees was rewarded with her being made a Commander of the Most Excellent Order of the British Empire (CBE) in the 1952 New Year Honours.

== Personal life ==
Ethel Kathleen Mee married merchant navy officer James McLean in 1898 in Glasgow, the marriage was short as McLean died in 1904.

After T. P. Sykes death in 1919, Kathleen married Bradford businessman William Chambers in 1922 at St Patrick's Church, Bradford. Their son Dennis was born in 1924. Chambers was widowed for the third time when William died in 1947 only months after their silver wedding anniversary.

In 1941 Chambers was awarded the Pro Ecclesia et Pontifice for her public services.

Chambers was a long-time member of the governing body (the Council) of the University of Leeds and in 1951 was made an honorary Doctor of Laws by the University. (Note: Chambers second husband T.P. Sykes was also an honorary graduate of Leeds University having been awarded an honorary MA in 1906.)

Chambers died at Bradford Royal Infirmary on 15 April 1965 and was still a serving member of Bradford council at her death, she was survived by her son Dennis.
