= Doris Birdsall =

Doris Birdsall CBE (20 July 1915 – 11 June 2008) was a Labour councillor for 26 years, first for Bradford Moor and later Wyke, and Lord Mayor of Bradford during 1975–1976.

== Life ==
Doris Birdsall was the daughter of a mill-working mother and a trade union organiser father. She was educated at Hanson Girls' Grammar School, leaving when she was 16, and married in 1940. Eight years later, Birdsall moved with her husband to Hartlepool.

She joined the Labour Party in 1948. Returning to Bradford during the mid-1950s, Doris was elected to the city council in 1958, winning a seat in Bradford Moor. She switched to Wyke 13 years later, serving as councillor from 1971 to 1984. Birdsall, who moved to Baildon, was Lord Mayor from 1975 to 1976.

In 1984, she retired from local politics, and, in 1986, was appointed a CBE "for services to education". She died in 2008, leaving two children, two grandchildren, and a great-grandson.

Civic offices
Preceded by Tom Edward Hall	Lord Mayor of Bradford; 1975–1976	Succeeded by Frank Hillam
