= Listed buildings in Bradford (Bowling and Barkerend Ward) =

Bradford's ward's building list

Bowling and Barkerend is a ward in the metropolitan borough of the City of Bradford, West Yorkshire, England. It contains 31 listed buildings that are recorded in the National Heritage List for England. Of these, one is listed at Grade I, the highest of the three grades, two are at Grade II*, the middle grade, and the others are at Grade II, the lowest grade. The ward covers an area to the east of the centre of Bradford, and is largely residential. Undercliffe Cemetery is in the ward and a number of monuments there are listed. Most of the other listed buildings are houses and cottages, and the other listed buildings include schools, churches, public houses, and a former textile mill,

== Key ==
| Grade | Criteria |
|---|---|
| I | Buildings of exceptional interest, sometimes considered to be internationally important |
| II* | Particularly important buildings of more than special interest |
| II | Buildings of national importance and special interest |

== Buildings ==
| Name and location | Photograph | Date | Notes | Grade |
|---|---|---|---|---|
| Bolling Hall; 53.77895°N 1.73887°W | | 14th century (probable) | The hall, later a museum, is in sandstone and gritstone, the oldest parts are the flanking towers, the two-storey range between dating mainly from the 17th century. The towers have parapet copings and stone slate roofs. The central range contains a variety of windows, including semicircular and circular mullioned windows, cross mullioned windows, and two two-storey canted bay windows, one with an embattled parapet and the other with a pyramidal roof. The hall has a large mullioned and transomed window with a semicircular window and an ogee window above. At the rear are projecting wings. | I |
| Butler House; 53.79726°N 1.74137°W | | 17th century | The house, which was later refronted, is in sandstone, with paired eaves brackets, and a stone slate roof with coped gables. There are two storeys and a symmetrical front of five bays. The central doorway has Doric pilasters, a reeded door head, a semicircular fanlight, a broken entablature, and an open dentilled pediment. The windows on the front are sashes with lintels and keystones, and at the rear is a six-light mullioned window. | II |
| Boldshay Hall; 53.79912°N 1.73248°W | — | c. 1740 | A sandstone house on a plinth, with rusticated quoins, a moulded string course, a moulded eaves cornice, and a stone slate roof with coped gables and shaped kneelers. There are two storeys and a symmetrical front of five bays. The central doorway has a Gibbs surround, and a pediment with a massive triple keystone. The windows have moulded architraves and moulded sills on block brackets. | II |
| Scarr Hall; 53.80490°N 1.72714°W | — | Late 18th century | A manor house, later used as a golf club house, it is in sandstone on a plinth, with bands, an eaves band, and a Welsh slate roof. In the centre is a pedimented three-storey three-bay block flanked by slightly recessed two-storey two-bay wings. The windows on the front are sashes with thin lintels. The doorway is in the right gable end, it has a deep cornice hood on shaped brackets, and above it is a Venetian window. | II |
| 10 and 12 Billingly Terrace; 53.78004°N 1.72984°W | — | c. 1820 | A pair of houses incorporating earlier material, they are in sandstone, No. 12 has a rendered front, and the roof is in stone slate with saddlestones. There are two storeys, and each house has two bays. On the front are porches, that of No. 12 gabled, and doorways with squared jambs, pilasters, arched fanlights with keystones, and entablatures. At the rear the upper floor of No. 12 is jettied on cast iron columns, at the corner is a corbel on a pier, and there are mullioned windows. | II |
| 2–8 Billingly Terrace; 53.77997°N 1.73010°W | — | Early 19th century | A row of stone cottages in sandstone, partly rendered, with a stone slate roof. The doorways have squared jambs, the windows are mullioned with two lights, and No. 2 has a stone slab garden fence. | II |
| The Napoleon Public House; 53.78478°N 1.73549°W | | Early 19th century | The public house is in painted sandstone, with a shallow frieze, a moulded eaves cornice, and a stone slate roof. There are two storeys, four bays, and a rear wing. The doorway in the second bay has pilasters, the flanking bays contain two-storey bow windows, and in the right bay is a garage door. The rear wing contains mullioned windows and doorways with squared jambs. | II |
| Main office building, former Bowling Iron and Gas Works; 53.78654°N 1.72976°W | — | c. 1830 | A house, later used for other purposes, it is in sandstone. The southwest front has a sill band, a dentilled eaves cornice and a blocking course, a full-height canted bay window, and sash windows. On the north front is a large projecting bow window and a three-light mullioned window. | II |
| The former Cook and Bottle Public House; 53.79696°N 1.74401°W | | Early to mid 19th century | The former public house is in sandstone with a Welsh slate roof. There are two storeys and an L-shaped plan. To the right of the central doorway is a two-light former dram shop window with a flat hood on console brackets. Most of the other windows are sashes, the one to the left of the doorway with a flat hood on console brackets. On the corner is a doorway with V-shaped jambs and a massive lintel, and in the right return are two mullioned windows. | II |
| St John's Church, East Bowling; 53.78256°N 1.73236°W | | 1840–42 | Much cast iron was used in the framework of the church, which is encased in sandstone. It is in Early English style, and consists of a nave, north and south aisles, north and south transepts, a chancel, and a west steeple. The steeple has a tower with three stages, buttresses, a west doorway, a machicolated parapet with corner pinnacles, and a recessed octagonal stone spire. At the east end is a triple lancet window. | II |
| Guy's Cliffe; 53.80318°N 1.74070°W | — | c. 1850 | A terrace of houses stepped up a hill in pairs, along a terraced walk. They are in sandstone with bands, a moulded frieze, an eaves cornice on consoles, and Welsh slate roofs. There are two storeys, and each house has two bays. The paired porches have pilasters and recessed doorways, and the windows have architraves, those above the porches with segmental heads, and those flanking the porches are tripartite. No. 13 at the lower end has three bays. | II |
| Barkerend Mills; 53.79604°N 1.73703°W | | Mid 19th century | A former textile mill that was extended in about 1870. It is in sandstone, and consists of a long range with six storeys, and the earlier range at the rear at right angles, with six storeys and 15 bays. There is a bracketed eaves cornice, and the windows have segmental-arched lintels. The other features include terminal stair turrets, a central hoist tower, and the base of the former chimney. | II |
| Miles Moulson Monument; 53.80470°N 1.73534°W | | c. 1856 | The monument in Undercliffe Cemetery is to the memory of members of the Moulson family. It consists of a pedestal with a cornice carrying a statue depicting a mourning girl leaning on an urn with garlands and a fluted neck. | II |
| Illingworth Mausoleum; 53.80442°N 1.73688°W | | c. 1860 | The mausoleum in Undercliffe Cemetery is to the memory of members of the Illingworth family. It is in granite, and is in the form of an Egyptian mastaba. The entrance is flanked by fluted columns with lotus leaf decoration, and above it is a deep concave cornice. The entrance is approached by steps flanked by sphinxes, and the doorway is in bronze. | II |
| Swithin Anderton Monument; 53.80440°N 1.73689°W | | c. 1860 | The monument in Undercliffe Cemetery is to the memory of Swithin Anderton and his family. It is in the form of the Albert Memorial, with the statue replaced by a column on a pedestal rising to support the ribbed vault of the canopy. At the corners are clustered columns rising to form pinnacles. At the top are crocketed gables, and a short spire on an octagonal embattled base. | II |
| Joseph Smith Obelisk; 53.80392°N 1.74023°W | | Mid to late 19th century | The obelisk is in Undercliffe Cemetery. It is tall and in granite. | II |
| Barkerend School, shed and wall 53.79777°N 1.73635°W | | 1873 | The school, which was later extended, is in stone with slate roofs, and is in Early English style. There is one storey, a long range along the street, and a T-shaped central rear wing. The school has a plinth, quoins, buttresses, a sill band, and mullioned and transomed windows. It incorporates an open play shed with four bays and cast iron columns. The boundary wall has stepped gabled coping, and it contains two pairs of octagonal gate piers with pinnacles. | II |
| Feversham Street First School; 53.79244°N 1.74108°W | | 1873 | The school was designed by Lockwood and Mawson in Gothic Revival style. It is in sandstone, and has a single storey, and a long irregular plan, with a hall cross-wing at the northeast end. Near the centre is a porch that rises to become an octagonal tower surmounted by a lantern with colonnettes and a spirelet. Along the front are gabled bays with finials and arched windows, interspersed by bays containing two-light windows with colonnettes. | II* |
| St Mary's Church and Presbytery; 53.79637°N 1.74333°W | | 1874–76 | A Roman Catholic church in sandstone with a slate roof. It consists of a nave with a tall clerestory, north and south aisles, a chancel with an apse, and a gabled Lady chapel. Adjacent to the church is the presbytery that has three storeys and a basement, and a front of three bays. The left bay is gabled and contains a two-storey canted bay window, and in the right bay is a two-storey rectangular bay window. | II |
| Wapping Road School, steps and walls 53.80123°N 1.74677°W | | 1877 | The former school, which was later altered and extended, is in stone with Welsh slate roofs. There are two main blocks on a sloping site. The left block has a single storey and a basement, and ten bays, and the right block has a single storey and a basement, and nine bays. Between the blocks is a stone staircase that has balustraded walls with chamfered coping, and there is a boundary wall with chamfered coping and railings. | II |
| School House, Wapping Road School; 53.80149°N 1.74665°W | — | c. 1877 | The house is in stone with a Welsh slate roof. There are two storeys and four bays. The central doorway has a fanlight, some of the windows are sashes, and others have been reglazed. | II |
| Chapel, Bowling Cemetery; 53.77214°N 1.73567°W | | 1886 | The chapel, now disused, is in sandstone with a green slate roof, and is in Gothic Revival style. There is a porch at the west end, and an apsidal east end. At the northwest is an octagonal spirelet, and there is a separately roofed vestibule. | II |
| Behrens Mausoleum; 53.80440°N 1.73680°W | | c. 1889 | The mausoleum in Undercliffe Cemetery is to the memory of Sir Jacob Behrens and his family. It is in stone, and in Renaissance style. The mausoleum has a stepped plinth and is supported by carved scrolls. It is flanked by pairs of fluted Corinthian columns carrying a swagged frieze and a segmental pediment. On the top is an achievement crest surmounted by an anthemion acroterion. | II |
| Mawson Monument; 53.80416°N 1.73829°W | | 1889 | The monument in Undercliffe Cemetery is to the memory of the architect William Mawson and members of his family. It is in granite, and consists of an obelisk with incised Egyptian decoration. On the monument is a medallion depicting the architect, and it is surmounted by a cross. | II |
| St Clement's Church, Barkerend; 53.79797°N 1.73137°W | | 1892–94 | The church, designed by E. P. Warren is in sandstone. It consists of a nave with a clerestory, north and south aisles, a chancel, and a northwest turret. The turret is octagonal, and has a clock face, slate-faced louvres, and an embattled parapet. Much of the internal decoration is by Morris & Co. and includes paintings by Edward Burne-Jones. | II* |
| Carlton-Bolling School; 53.79849°N 1.73147°W | | 1897 | The school is in stone with a rusticated basement, sill bands, an eaves cornice, and hipped and gabled slate roofs, the gables coped. There are two storeys, a basement and attic, and a front of ten bays, the two outer bays projecting slightly. Above the middle two bays is a shaped gable containing a plaque, and ball finials. The openings in the basement and ground floor have elliptical arches and keystones. On the roof is a square bell turret with a pyramidal roof and a weathervane. On the entrance front is a two-storey projecting bay with a hipped roof, and to its left is a round-arched doorway with a rusticated surround, a fanlight and a segmental pediment. | II |
| Former Craft Block, Carlton-Bolling School; 53.79845°N 1.73188°W | | 1899 | The block is in stone on a plinth, with a sill band, an eaves cornice, and hipped slate roofs. There are two storeys and ten bays, the middle two bays projecting slightly, flanked by rusticated pilasters, and surmounted by a shaped gable containing a datestone, and ball finials. The ground floor windows have flat heads and cross mullions, and the windows in the upper floor have rusticated segmental heads and keystones. At the rear is a square projection with two storeys, six bays, a shaped parapet and a shouldered gable. | II |
| School House, Carlton-Bolling School; 53.79876°N 1.73119°W | — | c. 1899 | A stone house that has a Welsh slate roof with a coped side wall. There are two storeys and attics, and a single bay. On the front is a projecting square porch with a hipped roof. | II |
| 181 Barkerend Road and 1 Hendford Drive; 53.79717°N 1.73638°W | — | c. 1900 | A house on a corner site designed by Barry Parker in Arts and Crafts style, it is built in sandstone with some timber framing in the upper floor, a slate roof, and two storeys. Also in the upper floor is a long range of continuous casement windows. On the canted corner is an oriel window on large corbels, and the ground floor contains mullioned windows. On the east front is a recessed entrance with a canted bay window, and above in the upper floor is a longer rectangular bay window. | II |
| Byron First School; 53.79904°N 1.73169°W | | 1901 | The school was extended in 1905 and later. It is in stone on a chamfered plinth, with an eaves band, and hipped Welsh slate roofs. There are two double-pile blocks, an entry block on the left, and a utility block on the right. The left block has two storeys and basements and six bays, two of them gabled, the right block projects slightly and has one storey and basements and four bays. Most of the windows are cross casements with mullions and transoms. The entrance block contains two doorways with rusticated pilasters and segmental pediments, and at the left is a two-storey tower with a ramped pediment. | II |
| School House, Byron Primary School; 53.79928°N 1.73194°W | — | c. 1901 | The house is in stone on a chamfered plinth, and has a Welsh slate roof with coped gables. There are two storeys, a basement and an attic, and a front of one bay. On the front facing the street is a three-light mullioned window, with plain windows above and a box dormer. The doorway in the right return has a rusticated surround, and above it is an oriel window with a ramped parapet. | II |
