= John Sowden =

British watercolourist and businessperson

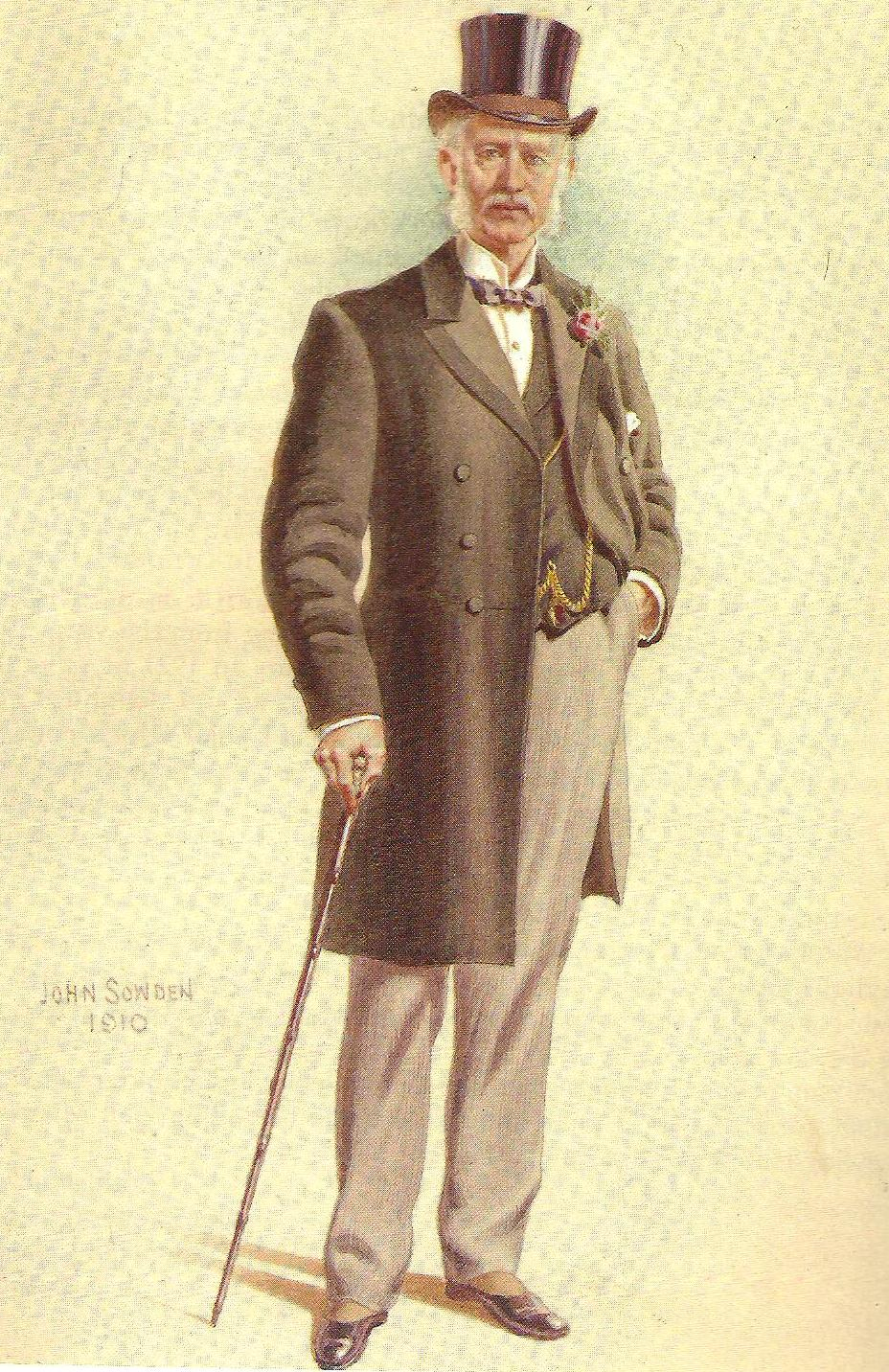
- Self-portrait watercolour painting (1910)
- Born: 10 November 1838; 16 Ebenezer Street, Bradford, West Yorkshire, England
- Died: 16 January 1926 (aged 87); Bradford, West Yorkshire, England
- Burial place: Undercliffe Cemetery, Bradford, West Yorkshire, England; 53.804°N 1.737°W
- Education: Bradford Mechanics Institute
- Occupations: Painter; businessperson
- Employer(s): Bradford Mechanics Institute; Bradford School of Design
- Known for: Watercolours; landscapes; portraits; still life
- Notable work: Worthies and Characters (1887–1914)
- Style: Figurative art
- Parents: William Sowden (father); Mary Sowden (mother)

John Sowden (1838–1926) was a watercolourist based in the city of Bradford, West Yorkshire, England. He is known for painting of local Bradford dignitaries and a series of pictures depicting street characters in the city.

Sowden was born on 10 November in Bradford, the son of a local joiner. He was articled into the practice of George Knowles, a Bradford-based architect, where he initially trained to be an architect. He was also interested in art and attended evening classes at the Bradford Mechanics Institute from 1855. In 1858, he won prizes for his artwork and in 1859, upon graduation, he was appointed as art master there. He was later appointed to be the head of art, holding this position until 1901. He was also the second master at the Bradford School of Design.

In the early 1860s, Sowden established his own studio in Stirling Street, off Manchester Road in Bradford, producing landscape and portrait pictures. There was increasing demand for paintings in Bradford during Victorian times due to the wealth of the city. He was involved with establishing the Bradford Artists' Society of Painting and Sculpture. Later he founded and was President of the Bradford Art Society. He exhibited at the Royal Academy in London over 19 years during 1863–1892.

In 1875, on the death of his father, John Sowden received a considerable inheritance. Sowden used his architectural experience to become a property developer, acquiring inner-city sites in Bradford, which he developed into mills, housing, and warehouses for the city's increasing cloth manufacturing industry. He established a partnership with George Brown, a Bradford clothier and tailor, and became an early developer of the Eastbrook estate, which became known as "Little Germany". They also bought the White Swan Inn, developing this into the Swan Arcade, a new idea for shopping during Victorian times. The arcade had market rooms, offices, shops, and warehouses.

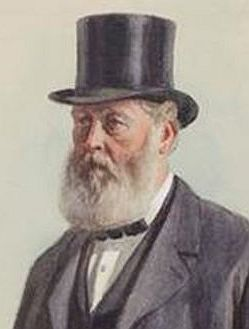
Detail of one of Sowden's "Worthies", Thomas Hill, mayor of Bradford, painted in 1888

Sowden painted has Worthies and Characters series from 1887 to 1914. He only included those of who he approved, whether dignitaries or street hawkers. His street character portraits were exhibited locally in 1891, 1897, and 1901. During 1904–1906, Sowden was the Vice President of the Yorkshire Union of Artists. He exhibited artworks at the Dudley Gallery Art Society, Grosvenor Gallery, Manchester Academy of Fine Arts, New Gallery, Royal Birmingham Society of Artists, Royal Institute of Painters in Water Colours, Royal Scottish Society of Painters in Watercolour, and the Walker Art Gallery, Liverpool.

In 1921, Sowden donated a collection of 358 portraits, together with handwritten biographical notes about the "Worthies", to the Bradford Museum. John Sowden died on 16 January 1926 and was buried in Undercliffe Cemetery. His estate was valued at £48,255 (equivalent to £2.5+ million). Sowden's paintings have been exhibited at the Cartwright Hall Art Gallery and the archive of the Bradford District Museums & Galleries has many of his works accessible online.
