= List of mayors of Bradford =

This is a list of mayors and the later lord mayors of the city of Bradford.

After having elected a mayor since 1847 Bradford was awarded the dignity of a Lord Mayoralty by letters patent dated 16 September 1907. At the time, it was the seventh most populous borough in England and Wales, and the second largest in area, and thus the largest municipality without a Lord Mayor. When Bradford became a metropolitan borough in 1974 the honour was confirmed by letters patent dated 1 April 1974.

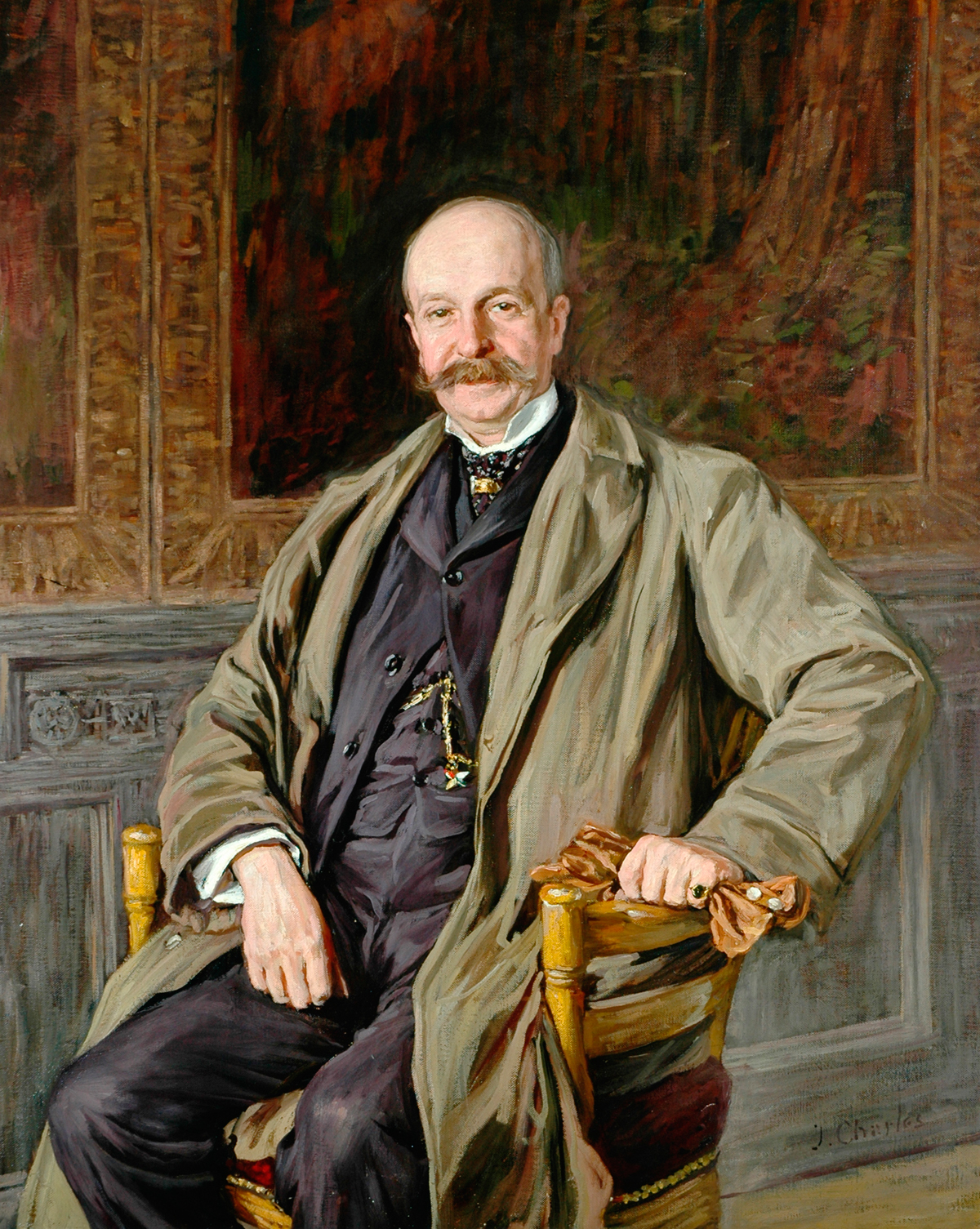
Sir John Arthur Godwin First Lord Mayor of Bradford by James Charles

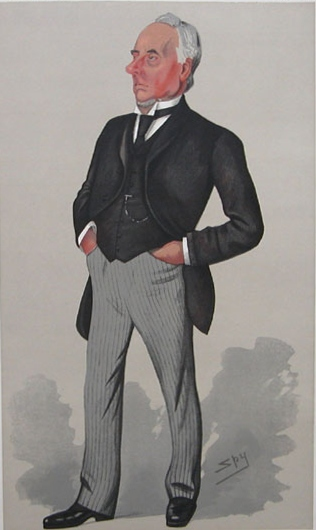
Henry Mitchell caricatured by Spy in Vanity Fair, 1890

== Mayors of Bradford ==
Year	Name	Notes
1847–48	Robert Milligan	MP for Bradford, 1851
1848–49	Titus Salt	Mill owner MP for Bradford, 1859
1849–50	Henry Forbes	
1850–51	William Rand	
1851–54	Samuel Smith	
1854–56	William Murgatroyd	
1856–59	Henry Brown	
1859–62	Isaac Wright	
1862–63	Matthew William Thompson	Railway company director MP for Bradford, 1867
1863–64	Joseph Farrar	
1864–65	Charles Semon	Textile merchant
1865–66	John Venimore Godwin	Photographer
1866–67	William Brayshaw	
1867–68	James Law	
1868-69	Edward West	
1869–71	Mark Dawson	
1871–73	Matthew William Thompson	Railway Company Director; MP for Bradford, 1867
1873–74	Manoah Rhodes	
1874–75	Henry Mitchell	Mill owner
1875–76	Wilson Sutcliffe	Managing partner of Bowling Dye Works
1876–77	George Motley Waud	
1877–78	Briggs Priestley	Mill owner MP for Pudsey, 1885
1878–81	Angus Holden	Textile company director MP for Bradford East,1885
1881–82	John Hill	Mill owner
1882–83	Frederick Priestman	
1883–85	Isaac Smith	
1885–86	Thomas Hill	Business owner
1886–87	Angus Holden	Textile company director MP for Bradford East, 1885
1887–88	John Limber Morley	
1888–89	William Moulson	
1889–90	Smith Feather	
1890–91	Ezra Waugh Hammond	
1891–92	Thomas Priestley	
1892–93	William Oddy	
1893–94	Jonas Whitley	
1894–96	William Willis Wood	
1896–98	Thomas Speight	
1898–99	William Edward Aykroyd	
1899–1902	William C. Lupton	
1902–04	David Wade	Alderman. Liberal
1904–05	William Edward Briggs Priestley	Mill owner MP for Bradford East, 1906
1905–06	William A. Whitehead	

== Lord mayors of Bradford ==
Year	Name	Notes
1906–07	Sir Arthur Godwin	Merchant, First Lord Mayor, 1907
1907–08	John E. Fawcett	
1908–09	James Hill	Woollen merchant MP for Bradford Central, 1916
1909–10	William Land	
1910–11	Jacob Moser	Textile merchant
1911–12	John B. Moorhouse	
1912–13	Fred Foster	
1913–14	John Arnold	
1914–15	George H. Robinson	
1915–16	Thomas Howarth	
1916–17	Abram Peel	
1917–18	John Bland	
1918	Herbert Hustler Tetley	
1918–19	Joseph Hayhurst	
1919	Walter Barber	
1919–20	William Wade	
1920–21	Anthony Gadie	Estate agent MP for Bradford Central, 1924
1921–22	Thomas Blythe	
1922–23	Thomas Sowden	
1923–24	Herbert M. Trotter	
1924–25	John Henry Palin	Union official MP for Bradford North, 1918
1925–26	Joseph Stringer	
1926–27	Richard Johnson	
1927–28	Michael Conway	
1928–29	Herbert T. Pullan	
1929–30	Angus H. Rhodes	
1930–31	Alfred Pickles	
1931–32	George Walker	
1932–33	John W. Longley	
1933–34	Arthur W. Brown	
1934–35	Walter Hodgson	
1935–36	Jonas Pearson	
1936–37	George R. Carter	
1937–38	Henry Hudson	
1938–39	Tom J. Robinson	
1939–40	Meredith Farrer Titterington	MP for Bradford South
1940–41	William Illingworth	
1941–42	Louis F.W.S. Smith	
1942–43	James Harrison	
1943–44	Walter Barraclough	
1944–45	Cecil Barnett	
1945–46	Kathleen Chambers	
1946–47	Thomas I. Clough	
1947–49	Frederick J. Cowie	
1949–50	George Thomas Meggison	
1950–51	Alton Ward	
1951–52	Horace Hird	Director, H. Hird (Steeplejack) Ltd
1952–53	John Shee	
1953–54	Angus Crowther	
1954–55	Henry James White	
1955	Herbert William Semper	
1955–56	Richard Cornelius Ruth	
1956–57	Horace Robert Walker	
1957–58	David Black (Mayor of Bradford)	
1958–59	Norbert William Durrant	
1959–60	Ernest England	
1960–61	Edgar Robinson	Textile manufacturer, Liberal
1961–62	Benjamin Wilfrid Berry	
1962–63	Harold K. Watson	
1963–64	Tom Wood (Mayor of Bradford)	
1964–65	Weber Marshall Hird	
1965–66	Jack Wilkinson (Mayor of Bradford)	
1966–67	Louis Cowgill	
1967	Thomas Lee (Mayor of Bradord)	
1968	John William Taylor	
1968–69	Arthur Walton	
1969–70	Edward Newby	
1970–71	John E. B. Singleton	Textile merchant, John Singleton & Son manufacturers
1971–72	Herbert Moran (Mayor of Bradford)	
1972–73	Audrey Firth	
1973–74	Derek Smith (Mayor of Bradford)	
April 1974	John E. B. Singleton	Textile merchant, John Singleton & Son manufacturers
1974–75	Tom Edward Hall	
1975–76	Doris Birdsall	
1976–77	Frank Hillam	
1977–78	Paul Hockney	
1978–79	Arthur F. Trigg	
1979–80	John S. Senior	
1980–81	Arnold Lightowler	
1981–82	Daniel C. Coughlin	
1982–83	Joan Lightband	
1983–84	Norman Free	
1984–85	Olive Messer	
1985–86	Mohammed Ajeeb	Housing director First Asian (Pakistani) Lord Mayor in the UK
1986–87	William Arthur Nunn	
1987–88	Laurie C. Coughlin	
1988–89	Smith Midgley	
1989–90	George Hodgson	
1990–91	Ernest Saville	
1991–92	Sydney John Collard	
1992–93	Barry Kenneth Thorne	
1993–94	Robert Sowman	
1994–95	Danny Mangham	
1995–96	Marilyn Beeley	
1996–97	Gordon Mitchell	
1997–98	James Anthony (Tony) Cairns	
1998–99	Tony Miller	
1999–2000	Harry Mason	
2000–01	John Stanley King	
2001–02	Ghazanfer Khaliq	
2002–03	Richard E.J. Wightman	Finance director
2003–04	Allan Irving Hillary	
2004–05	Irene Ellison-Wood	
2005–06	Valerie Binney	
2006–07	Choudhary Rangzeb	Businessman
2007–08	Robin Owens	
2008–09	Howard Middleton	
2009–10	John D Godward	
2010–11	Peter Hill	
2011–12	Naveeda Ikram	
2012–13	Dale Smith	
2013–14	Khadim Hussain	Engineer
2014–15	Mike Gibbons	
2015–16	Joanne Dodds	
2016–17	Geoff Reid	Methodist minister
2017–18	Abid Hussain	
2018–19	Zafar Ali	
2019–21	Doreen Lee	
2021–22	Shabir Hussain	
2022–23	Martin Love	First Green Party Lord Mayor of Bradford
2024-2025	Bev Mullaney	
2025	Mohammed Shafiq	

== See also ==
- Timeline of Bradford
