= William Gay (landscape gardener and surveyor) =

British landscape gardener and surveyor

- Born: 1814
- Died: 1893 (aged 78–79)
- Occupations: Landscape gardener and surveyor

William Gay (1814–1893) was a British landscape gardener and surveyor, and designed parks and cemeteries.

== Career ==
William Gay moved to Leicester where in 1849 he was clerk of work at Welford Road Cemetery then in 1852 registrar. While at Leicester, William was approached by the Bradford Cemetery Company to become Bradford Cemetery's first registrar. William moved from Leicester to Bradford to design and layout Undercliffe Cemetery over the years 1852 to 1854 and later became the cemetery's secretary.

The surveyor of Chorley cemetery James Derham, consulted William Gay who went on to prepare the design of the cemetery grounds using his favourite devices of a promenade, viewing platform, and raised and sunken terraces. In 1855 William Gay won a competition to design the grounds of Toxteth Park Cemetery, Toxteth, Liverpool. The cemetery was opened in 1856.

Philips Park Cemetery, Manchester was designed by William Gay, with architects Paull and Ayliffe. The cemetery opened in 1866 and was completed in 1867. In 1867 William laid out Belfast City cemetery in the form of a bell, possibly reflecting the Bel in Belfast and the cemetery opened on 1 August 1869.

William also designed and laid out Roberts Park, Saltaire for (Sir) Titus Salt and this opened in 1871. William landscaped Lawnswood Cemetery in Adel, Leeds and assisted architect George Corson with building design. The cemetery opened in 1874.

Horton Park, Bradford was designed by William Gay. Development started in 1873 and the park opened in 1878. William was architect for Pudsey Cemetery in Pudsey with John Senior responsible for laying out the grounds.

== Personal life ==
William Gay moved from Leicester to Bradford to design and lay out Undercliffe Cemetery and he lived at 43 Charnwood Road, Undercliffe. William died in 1893 and is buried in Undercliffe Cemetery, Bradford on 11 March 1893. His monument describes his occupation as 'former landscape gardener and surveyor'.
