= Henry Mitchell (mill owner) =

Sir Henry Mitchell (1824 – 27 April 1898) was a Bradford millowner.

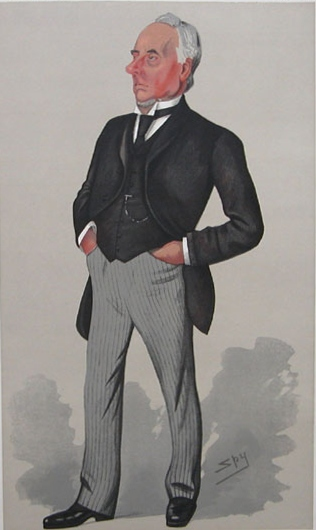
Mitchell caricatured by Spy in Vanity Fair, 1890

He was born in Esholt, Bradford to manufacturer Matthew Mitchell and started work at 14 years of age in his father's mill.

In 1841 he joined William Fison and Co and seven years later moved to A&S Henry and Co as a buyer, becoming a partner in 1852. By that time he was a leading authority on the worsted trade and influential in Bradford politics. He was a philanthropist and governor of the Bradford School Board and Grammar School and Vice President of the Bradford’s Mechanic Institute. He was a Justice of the Peace and elected Mayor of Bradford in 1874.

He founded Bradford Technical School, now part of Bradford College, which was opened by the future King Edward VII who was Prince of Wales at the time in 1882. He was knighted in the 1887 Golden Jubilee Honours List for his services to education. In 1898, just before his death, was made the first Honorary Freeman of the City of Bradford.

On his death he was buried in Undercliffe Cemetery, Bradford. He had married the daughter of a priest surnamed Gordon, of Earlston, with whom he had three sons.
