= Horton Park, Bradford =

Park in Bradford, England

Horton Park
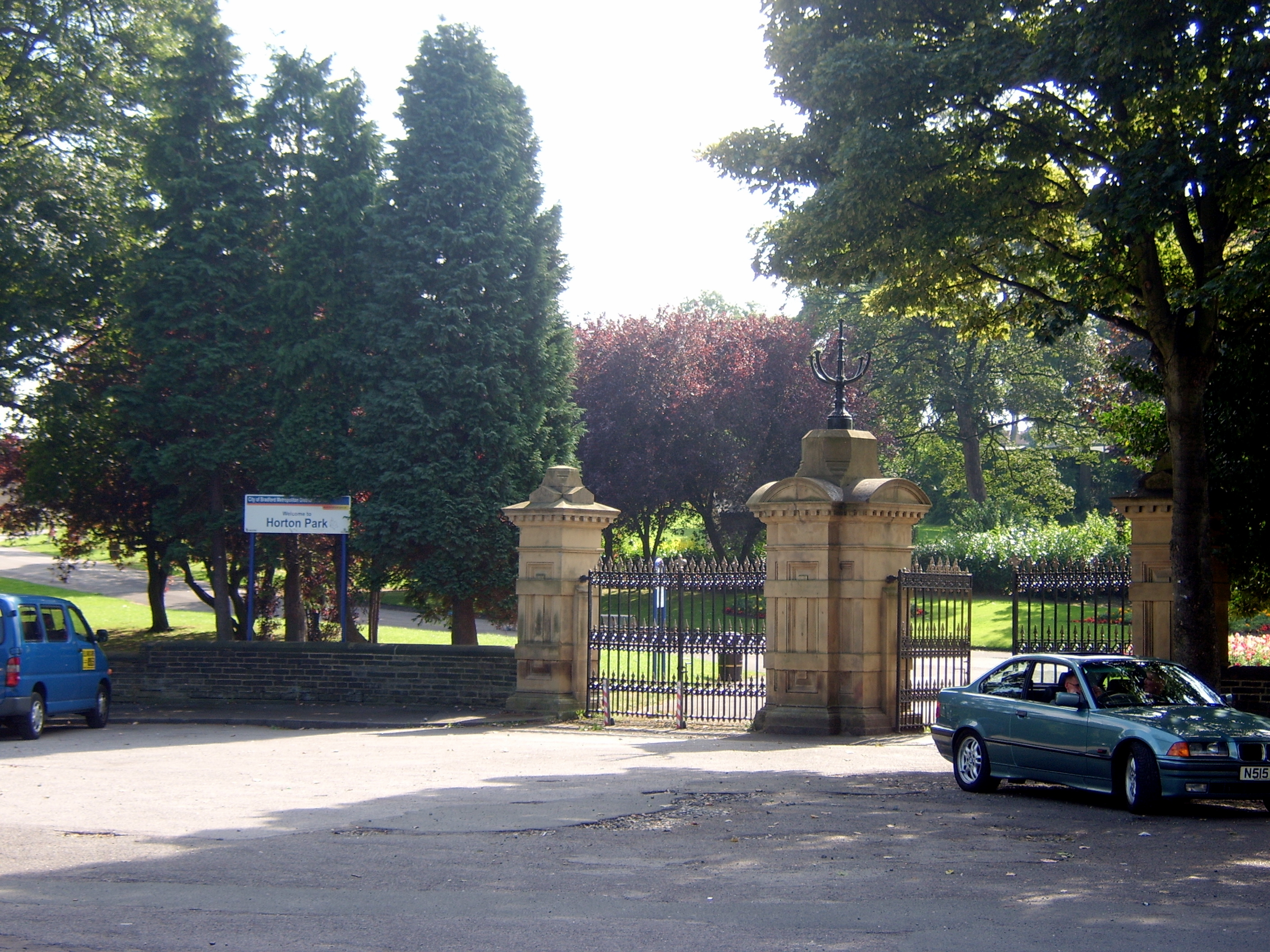
- The entrance to Horton Park on Horton Park Avenue
- Interactive map of Horton Park
- Type: Urban park
- Location: Great Horton, Bradford, West Yorkshire, England
- Coordinates: 53°46′46.92″N 1°46′26.4″W
- Opened: 25 May 1878
- Designer: William Gay
- Operator: City of Bradford, Parks and Landscape Services
- Open: All day, all year round
- Website: bradforddistrictparks.org

Horton Park is a public park in Bradford, England, located to the South of the city in Great Horton. It was opened on 25 May 1878 on land purchased by Bradford Council in 1873. The park was designed by William Gay landscape gardener and surveyor.

The park provides bowling greens, and a children's play area, as well as floral decorations. Bradford Council retains ownership of the park but, the park is primarily looked after by Glendale on contract. The bowling greens are open to the public from April to September each year. Vehicular access to the park is by permit only.

Horton Park parkrun, a volunteer led 5k event, takes place every Saturday at 9am.

In 1886, Thomas Hill, the mayor of Bradford, opened a drinking fountain at the park.
