= Thomas Hill (mayor) =

English magistrate, alderman, mayor, businessman, and carpenter master

Thomas Hill JP
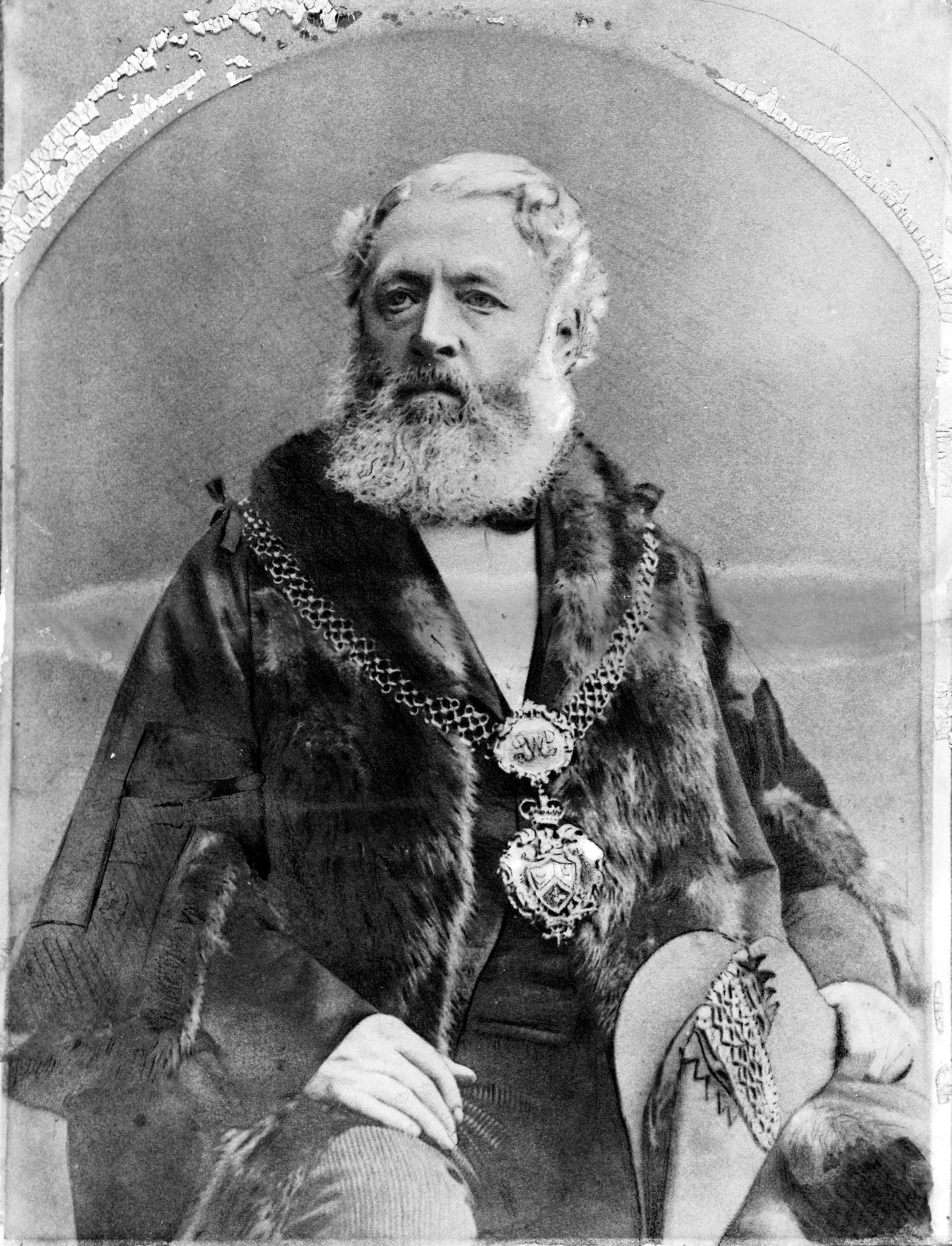
- Formal photograph of Hill in regalia
- Born: 11 January 1825; Bradford, England
- Died: 2 October 1891 (aged 66); Royd House, Manningham Lane, Bradford, England
- Burial place: Undercliffe Cemetery, Bradford, England; 53.804°N 1.737°W
- Occupation(s): magistrate, alderman, mayor, businessperson, carpenter master
- Known for: Mayor of Bradford
- Parents: Jonas Hill (father); Olive nee Whitaker (mother)
- Relatives: George Noel Hill (great nephew)

Thomas Hill JP (1825–1891) was a magistrate, alderman, mayor of the city of Bradford, businessman, and carpenter master.

== Biography ==
Hill was born on 11 January 1825 close to the Bradford Town Hall. He was the youngest of five brothers. His father was Jonas Hill, a builder and joiner, and his mother was Olive (nee Whitaker). He was baptised on 9 February 1825 at Bradford Cathedral. Hill joined the Freemasons in 1848. His father died in 1850 and with his brother Joshua Hill, he took over the family business. By 1851, he was employing 12 men. Around 1853, the partnership with his brother was dissolved and Thomas Hill took over the sole running of the business. In 1855, he became the Worshipful Master of the Freemasons Hope Lodge. He was an important figure in the West Yorkshire Province, including being a Warden of the West Riding Province and the Chairman of the Charity Committee. He was elected to be a member of the Peel Park Committee in 1860.

Thomas Hill was first elected as a Conservative Councillor for the West Ward on the Bradford Town Council in 1866. In 1869, he was elected to represent the East Ward. He remained a member of the Council for 25 years. In 1873, he was contracted to be the slater for the Wesleyan Chapel in Otley Road, Bradford. In 1874, he was in charge of South Ward. In the same year, he was elected as an Alderman in Bradford for six years, with the position renewed in 1880. In 1875, he donated £25 to the building fund for the Bradford Church Institute. In 1878, Thomas Hill transferred his business to Joshua Hill, his nephew. In 1882, he was in attendance as an Alderman during a visit of the Prince and Princess of Wales to Bradford.

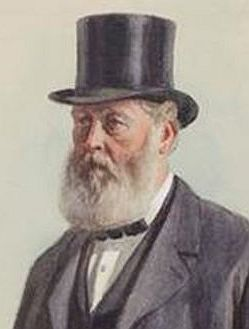
Detail of a Thomas Hill portrait painting (1888) by John Sowden

Hill was the 27th mayor of Bradford during 1885–86. He hosted a visit including a banquet in Bradford associated with the 1886 Colonial and Indian Exhibition that was held in London, supported the Prince of Wales. In 1886, as mayor, Hill opened a drinking fountain at Horton Park and also the Girlington Christian Mission Bazaar to raise funds for a new church in Thornton Road. In 1888, Hill was appointed a Justice of the Peace (JP). At the end of his life, Hill lived at Royd House in Manningham Lane, Bradford. After declining health for two years, he died at the age of 66 on 2 October 1891. Hill left a personal estate of £24,845 1s 1d (the equivalent of over £3 million). He is buried in the Undercliffe Cemetery, Bradford.

== See also ==
- List of mayors of Bradford
