= Henry James Alderson =

Sir Henry James Alderson KCB (22 May 1834 – 10 September 1909) was a Canadian-British major-general in the Royal Artillery.

== Life ==
Born in Quebec, Canada, on 22 May 1834, he was son of Lt.-Col. Ralph Carr Alderson of the Royal Engineers, by his wife Maria, daughter of Henry Thorold of Cuxwold, Lincolnshire; John Alderson the physician was his grandfather. Educated privately at Messrs. Stoton & Mayer's school at Wimbledon (1844–8), he entered the Royal Military Academy, Woolwich, as a cadet, in May 1848.

Alderson received a commission as second lieutenant in the Royal Artillery on 23 June 1852, and served in Canada until 1854, when, on promotion to the rank of lieutenant, he returned to England. Serving through the Crimean War, he was present at the battle of Alma, battle of Inkerman, and at the siege of Sebastopol. He was mentioned in despatches, and received the medal with three clasps, the Turkish medal, and the legion d'honneur, third class.

Promoted to the rank of second captain on 1 April 1859, Alderson from February to June 1864 was attached on special mission during the American Civil War to the headquarters of the Federal Army under General Quincy Adams Gillmore during the civil war in the United States of America, and was present at the bombardment of Charleston. On his return to England Alderson joined the experimental department of the school of gunnery, Shoeburyness, and became successively captain on 6 July 1867; major 3 July 1872; lieutenant-colonel 1 October 1877; colonel (by brevet) 1 October 1881, and major-general 9 July 1892.

From 1871 Alderson held appointments in the department of the director of artillery at the War Office, and in 1891 became president of the ordnance committee. He held this post until his retirement from the army on 22 May 1896, on account of age. From 1897 until his death he was a director of Sir W G Armstrong Whitworth & Co, the gunmaking firm at Elswick, Newcastle upon Tyne.

Alderson was made C.B. on 21 June 1887; a K.C.B. on 30 May 1891; and was appointed colonel commandant in the Royal Artillery on 4 November 1905. He died at Durham on 10 September 1909.

== Family ==
Alderson married in 1877 his second cousin, Florence, youngest daughter of Sir Edward Hall Alderson, baron of the exchequer, and had one son, Ralph Edward.
