= Undercliffe Cemetery =

Cemetery in Bradford, West Yorkshire, England

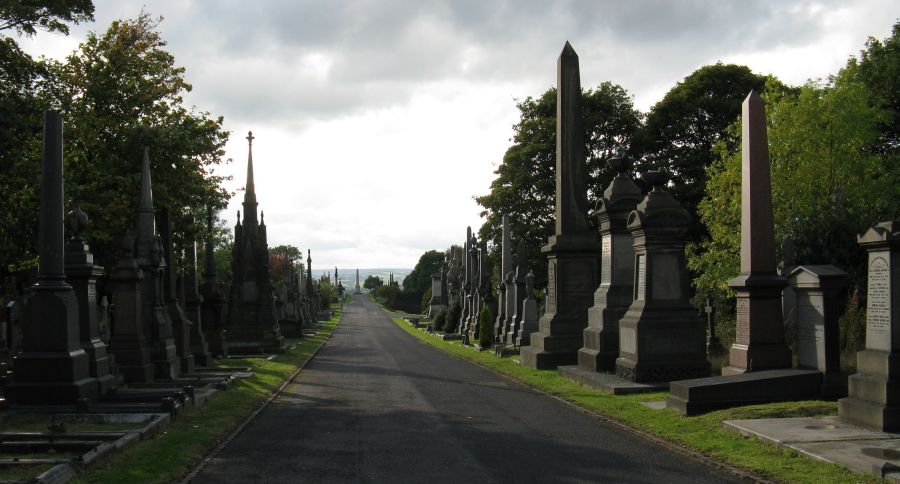
- Interactive map of Undercliffe Cemetery
- Type: Cemetery
- Location: Undercliffe, Bradford, West Yorkshire
- Coordinates: 53.804°N 1.737°W
- Area: 26 acres (11 ha)
- Elevation: 210 m (690 ft)
- Created: 1851–54
- Designer: William Gay
- Operator: The Undercliffe Cemetery Charity
- Status: Operational
- Website: www.undercliffecemetery.co.uk

Undercliffe Cemetery is located between Otley Road and Undercliffe Lane in the Bolton and Undercliffe ward, Bradford, West Yorkshire, England. The cemetery stands atop a hillside overlooking the city and contains Victorian funerary monuments in a variety of styles. It is a notable example of a Victorian cemetery where a number of rich and prominent local residents have been buried, including mill owners and former mayors. Undercliffe Cemetery is grade II* listed by English Heritage in their Register of Parks and Gardens of Special Historic Interest in England.

== History ==
In the early 1800s, Bradford's textile industry underwent rapid growth and with it Bradford's population, consequently there was pressure on housing then on burial ground space and this eventually became a health hazard. As a result, many of the existing cemeteries were closed by an Order in Council. Partly in response to this situation the 'Bradford Cemetery Company' was set up and provisionally registered in 1849. Membership of the company included local notables Henry Brown, Robert Milligan, William Rand, Edward Ripley and Titus Salt. The land used for the cemetery had previously been agricultural land with a farmhouse on part of the Undercliffe Estate of the Hustler family. The plot was purchased in 1851 by John Horsfall with £3,400 of monies from the Bradford Cemetery Company and the Bradford Cemetery Company properly founded in 1852. The cemetery was designed and laid out over the years 1851–1854 by park and cemetery designer William Gay (1814–1893) and architect John Dale for the sum of £12,000 for landscaping, planting and building involving the building in 1854 of two chapels on the main promenade.

The Anglican western section of the cemetery was consecrated by the Bishop of Ripon on 1 August 1854 and on the 21st the cemetery was opened. William Gay was appointed the first registrar for the cemetery and Joseph Smith (1800–1858) the first land agent. With its laid out gardens, lawns, shrubbery and few graves the cemetery became popular for promenading in an age before Bradford had its first public park.

In 1876 the planned westward extension of the cemetery did not happen and the land instead went for housing. The two chapels built on the main promenade in the historic core of the cemetery were replaced in 1878 by two larger chapels designed by Lockwood and Mawson.

=== Recent history ===
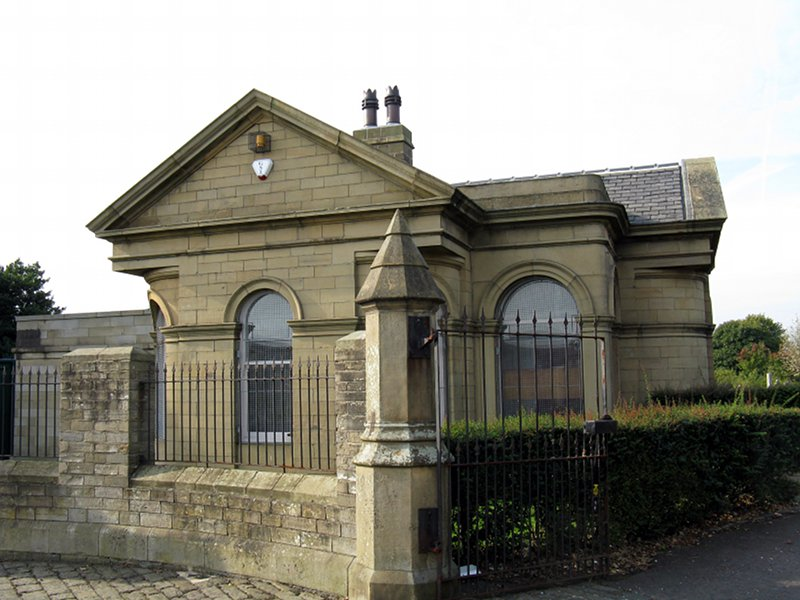
The lodge at the southern entrance

Following a decline in the number of burials the Undercliffe Cemetery Company was liquidated in 1977. Bradford Council at that stage could not justify the cost of adopting the cemetery. In 1980 the site was sold to a property developer then the chapels were demolished along with the lodges at the north and south entrances and some kerbstones were removed. It emerged that the registration of the cemetery to the property developer had been refused by the Land Registry under a clause that prohibits the sale of consecrated ground that has been used for burial. In 1984 after a local campaign, Bradford Council applied to compulsorily purchase the cemetery and the area was made a conservation area. A £360,000 three year Community Programme Scheme funded by the Manpower Services Commission cleared up the results of previous years' neglect and a lodge from Bowling Cemetery, Bradford was moved to the site and rebuilt at the southern entrance. In 1987 the management of the cemetery was given over to 'The Undercliffe Cemetery Charity' and in 1988 English Heritage added the cemetery to its Register of Parks and Gardens of Special Historic Interest as grade II listed and upgraded it to II star the next year.

== Layout ==
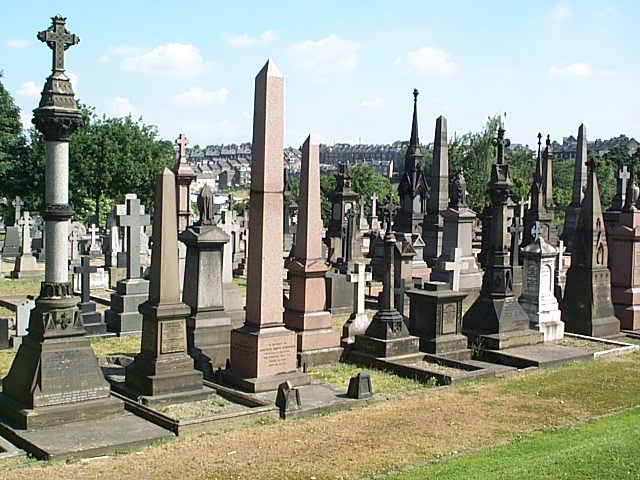
The historic core

The cemetery is at a height of 210 m above sea level with an area of 26 acres (10 hectares) accommodating some 124,000 burials and about 23,000 marked graves. A major feature of the cemetery is the long east–west promenade with the western end having excellent views over Bradford. Also at the western end is a small bandstand. At the historic core the land to the north of the promenade is terraced down to the northern entrance on Otley Road. Both entrances have a car park but only the south entrance on Undercliffe Lane has a lodge used for administration.

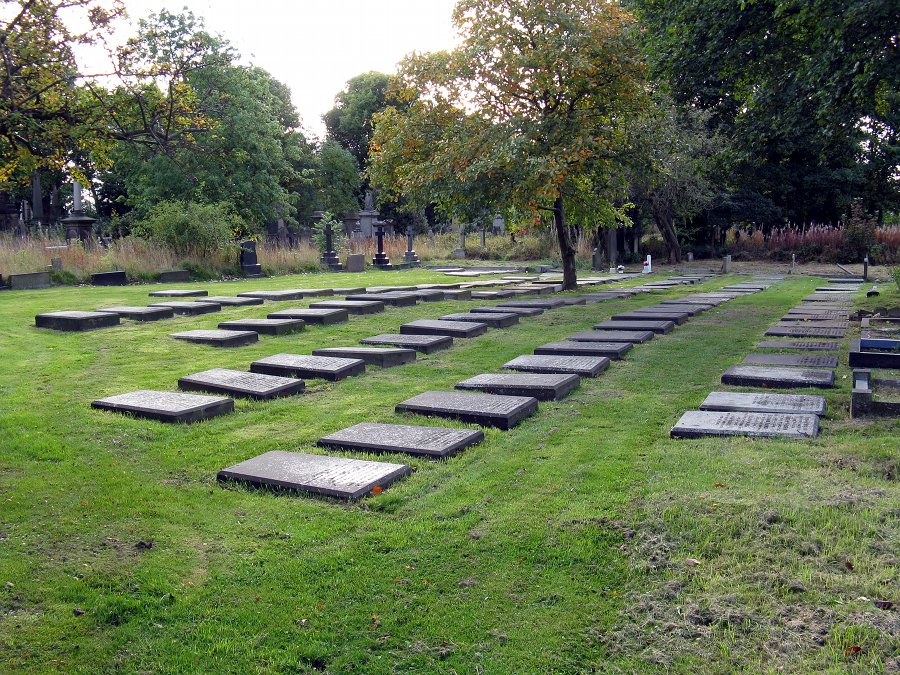
Quaker gravestones

Most of the western half of the site is consecrated for Anglican burials while the eastern half is set aside for non-conformist burials such as Baptist, Methodist, and Quaker. The Quaker graves are characterised by their identical horizontal ground level memorial stones. The northern area of the cemetery was set aside for the un-baptised and those who had been excommunicated or committed suicide. Communal graves known as 'company plots' are to be found on the southern side of the site where up to thirty coffins at a time were interred in one grave.

== Memorials ==
The cemetery contains the graves and memorials of the rich and famous, local industrialists, ex-mayors, businessmen, professionals, mill workers, and their relatives.

=== Listed buildings ===
Six of the memorials in the cemetery have listed building status and all are in good condition except for the Swithin Anderton monument:

- Joseph Smith Obelisk (mid/late 19th century), a prominent 30 ft tall grey granite obelisk to Joseph Smith, surveyor, businessman and land agent to the cemetery company.
- Mawson Monument (1889), a monument to William Mawson, architect partner of Henry Lockwood – a granite obelisk on a pedestal.
- Swithin Anderton Monument (1860), a Scott Monument inspired memorial to Swithin Anderton, JP and family, signed I S L Thornton.
- Illingworth Mausoleum (~1860), a grey granite mausoleum of the Illingworth family, owners of Whetley Mills on Thornton Road, in the style of an Egyptian mastaba.
- Behrens Monument (1889), a monument in renaissance style to Sir Jacob Behrens and family.
- Miles Moulson Monument (~1856) a monumental sculpture to the Moulson family of Horton by John Throp, sculptor. Miles Moulson himself was a monumental mason.
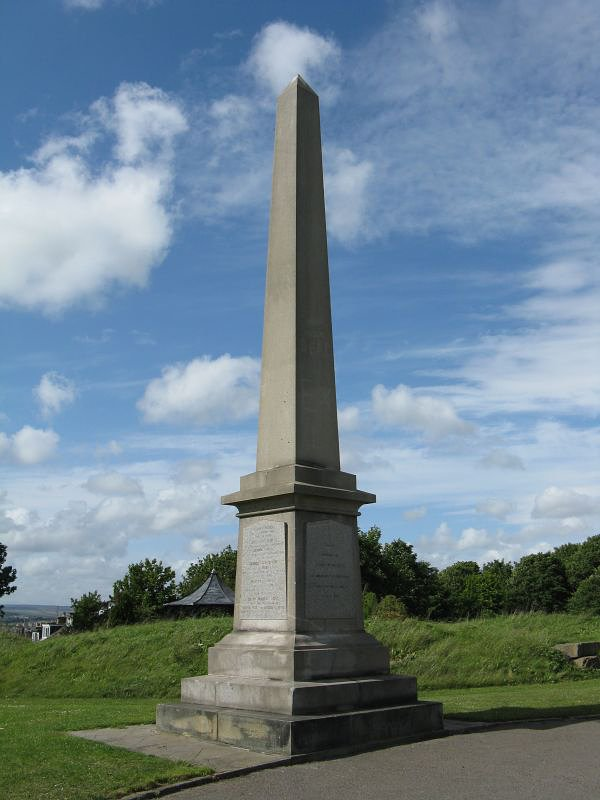
The Joseph Smith memorial obelisk

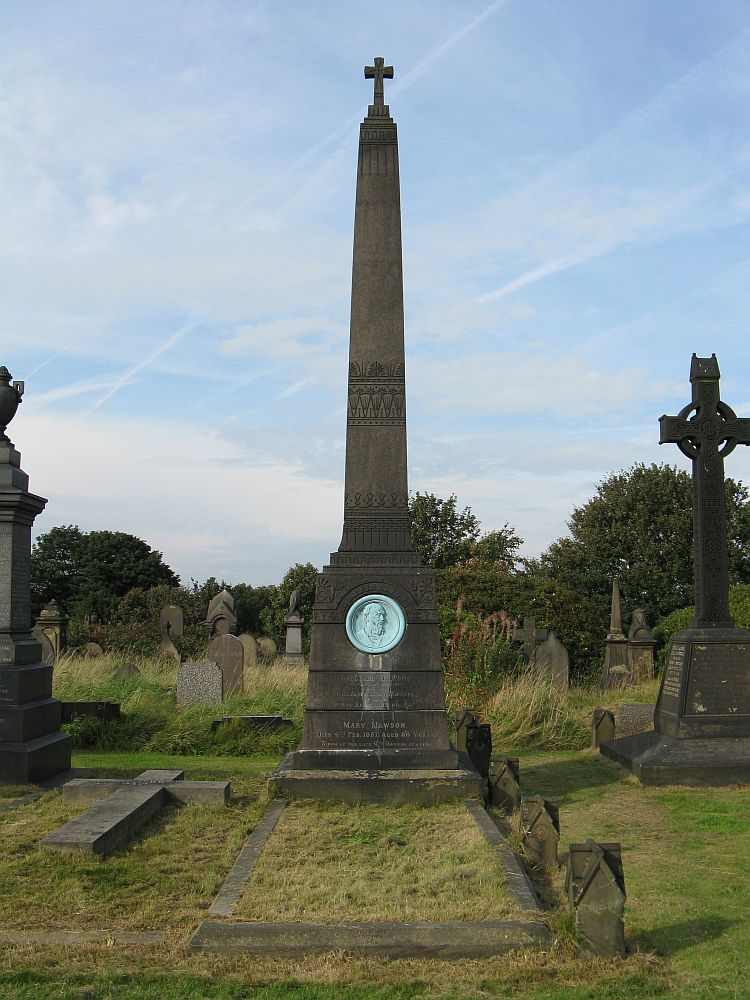
The William Mawson Monument

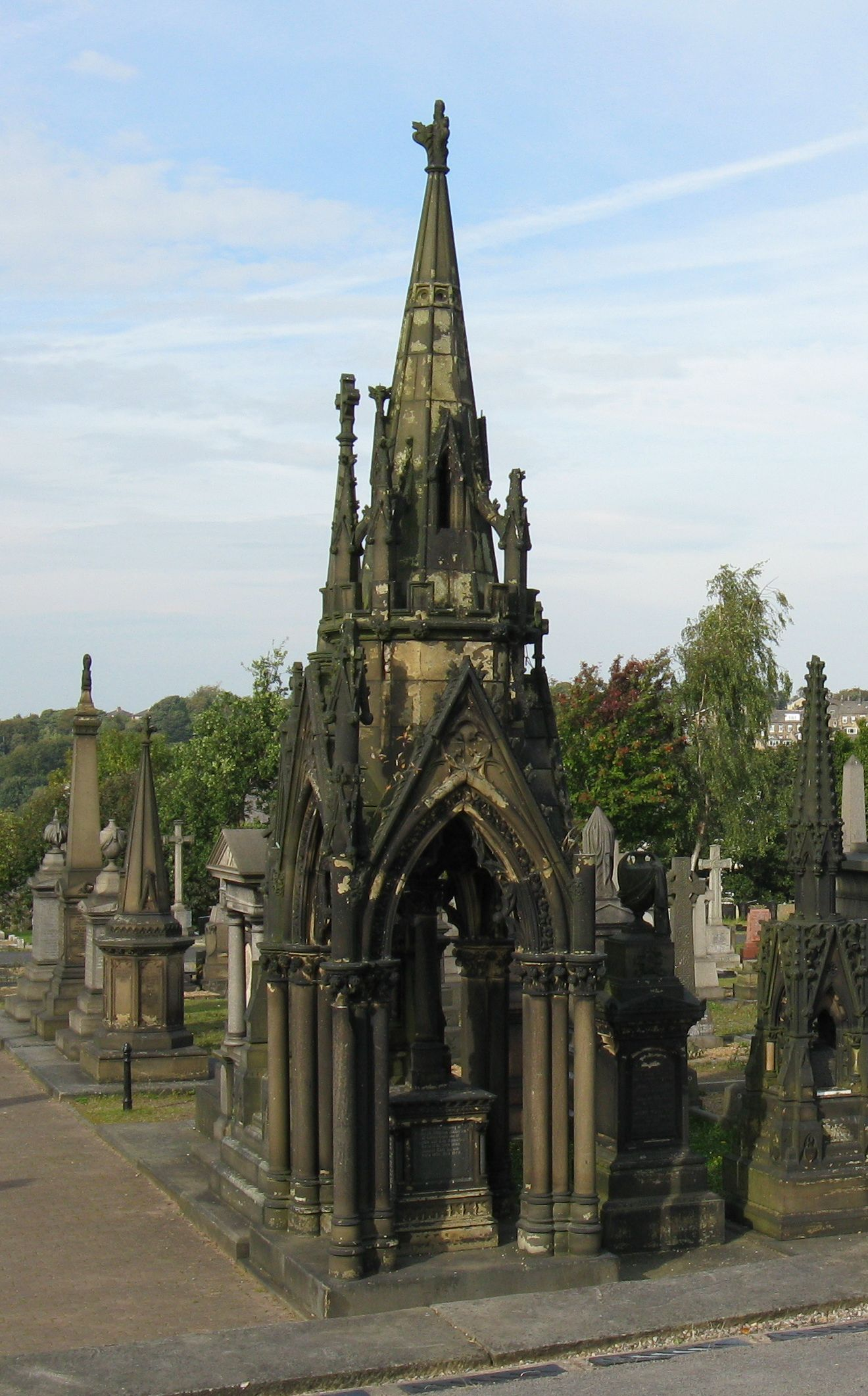
The Swithin Anderton Monument

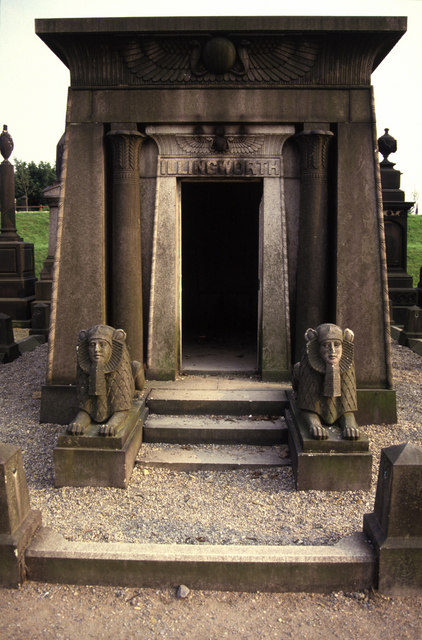
The Illingworth Mausoleum

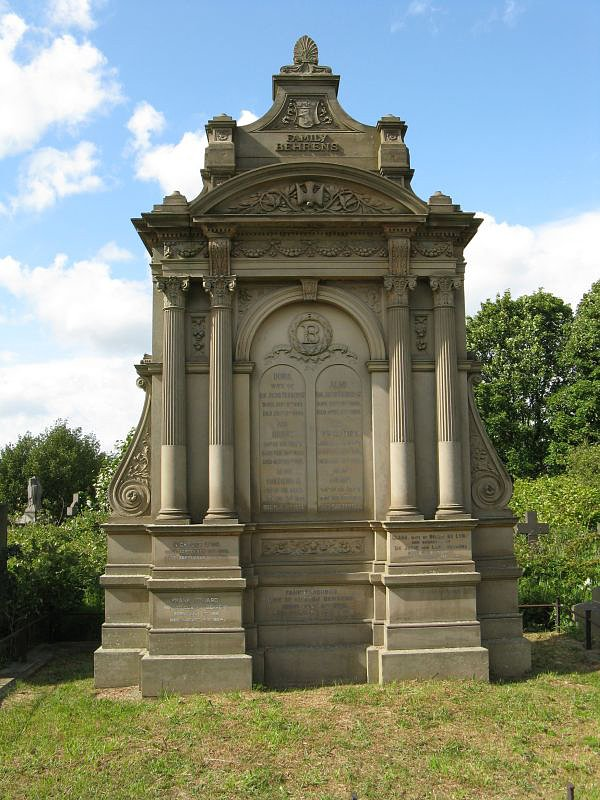
The 'Family Behrens' memorial

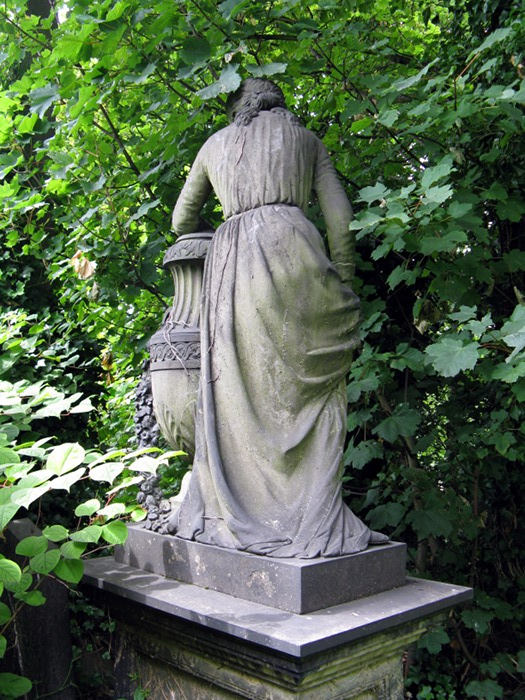
The Miles Moulson monument

=== Other notable burials ===
- John Henry Bell (1832–1906), physician and researcher best known for his work on Anthrax.
- Sir Anthony Gadie (1868–1948), military officer, mayor of Bradford, and MP.
- William Gay (1814–1893) Landscape gardener, surveyor, and first registrar of Undercliffe Cemetery.
- Stafford Heginbotham (1933–1995), business owner and former chairman of Bradford City A.F.C.
- Thomas Hill (1825–1891), mayor of Bradford.
- Sir Isaac Holden, bart (1807–1897), inventor and manufacturer.
- Robert Milligan (1786–1862), Bradford's first mayor and Liberal MP.
- Sir Henry Mitchell (1824–1898), founder of the Technical School, mayor, and first Freeman of the city.
- Sir Henry Ripley, bart. (1813–1882), industrialist and MP.
- Alfred Angas Scott (1875–1923), motorcycle designer, inventor, and founder of The Scott Motorcycle Company.
- Julia Varley (1871–1952), trade unionist and suffragette.
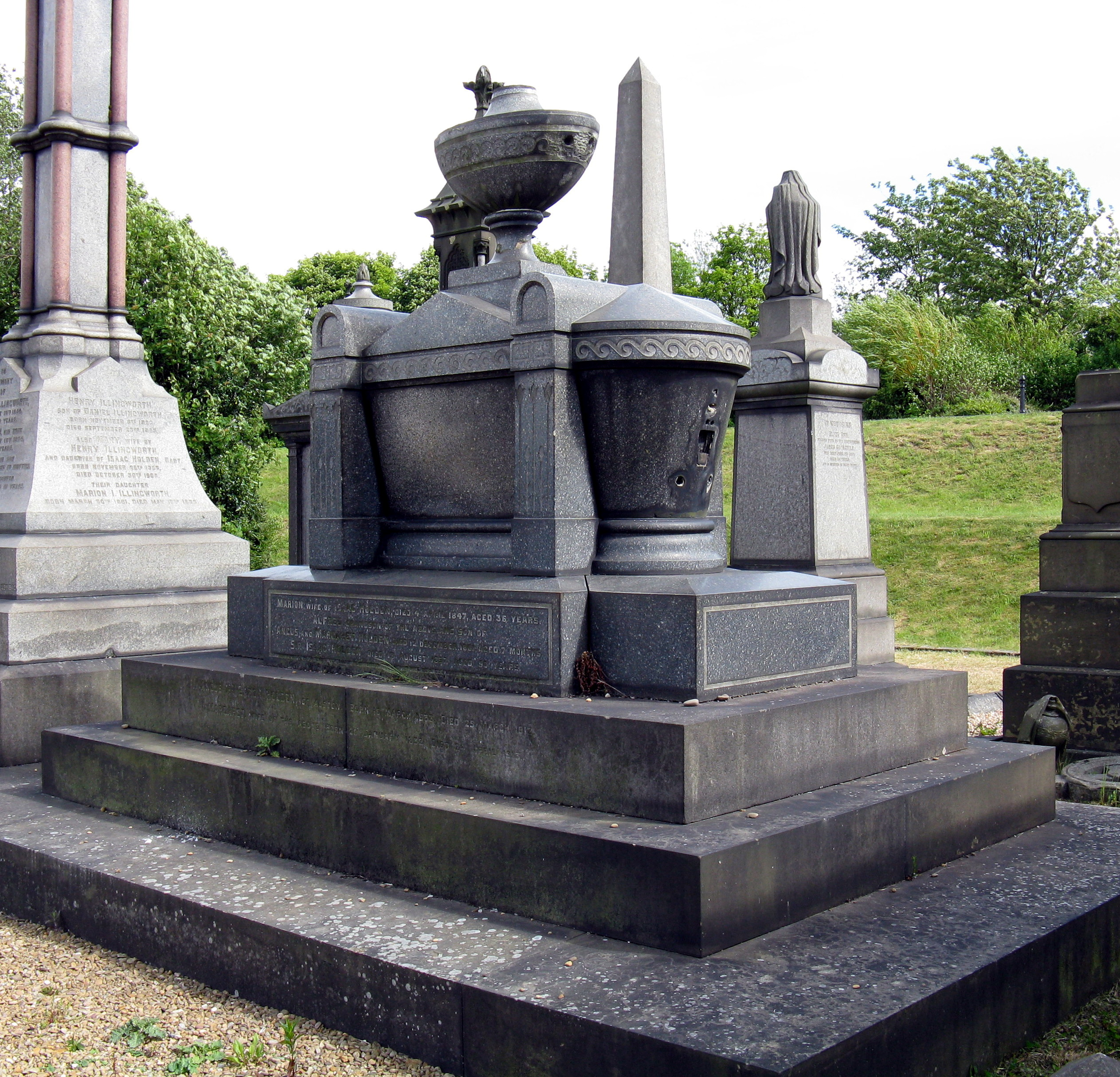
The monument to Sir Isaac Holden, bart.

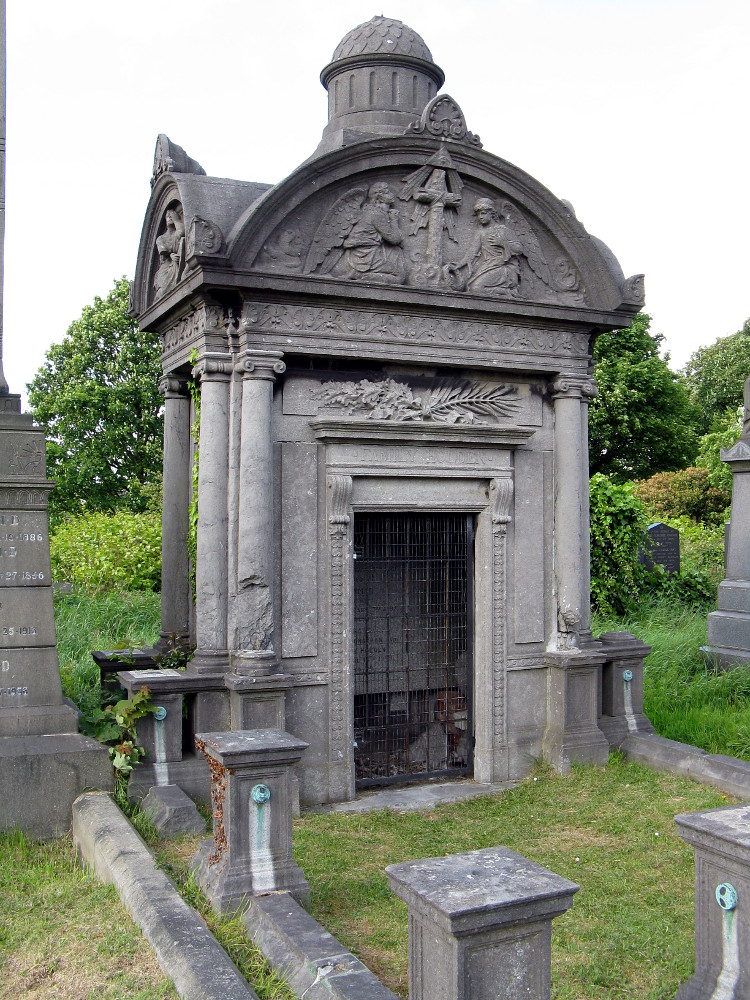
Holden family monument

=== War Memorial ===
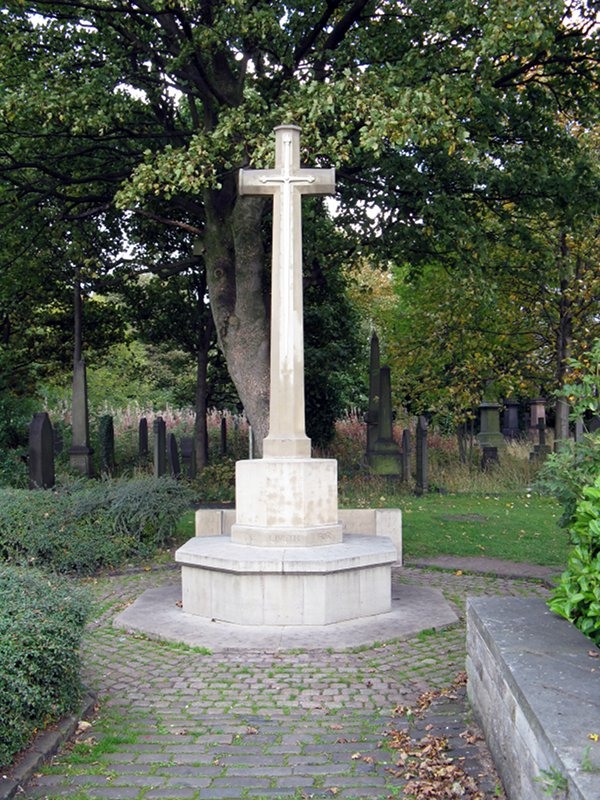
War memorial (Cross of Sacrifice)

Close to the car park at the southern entrance onto Undercliffe Lane is a war memorial in the form of Cross of Sacrifice to those who died in the First and Second World Wars. Behind the Cross of Sacrifice a low kerb memorial lists Commonwealth service personnel buried in the cemetery whose graves could not be marked by headstones. In all, 135 Commonwealth service personnel – 92 from the First and 43 from the Second World War – are buried here. Many of the former were burials from the Bradford War Hospital.

== The Undercliffe Cemetery Conservation Area ==
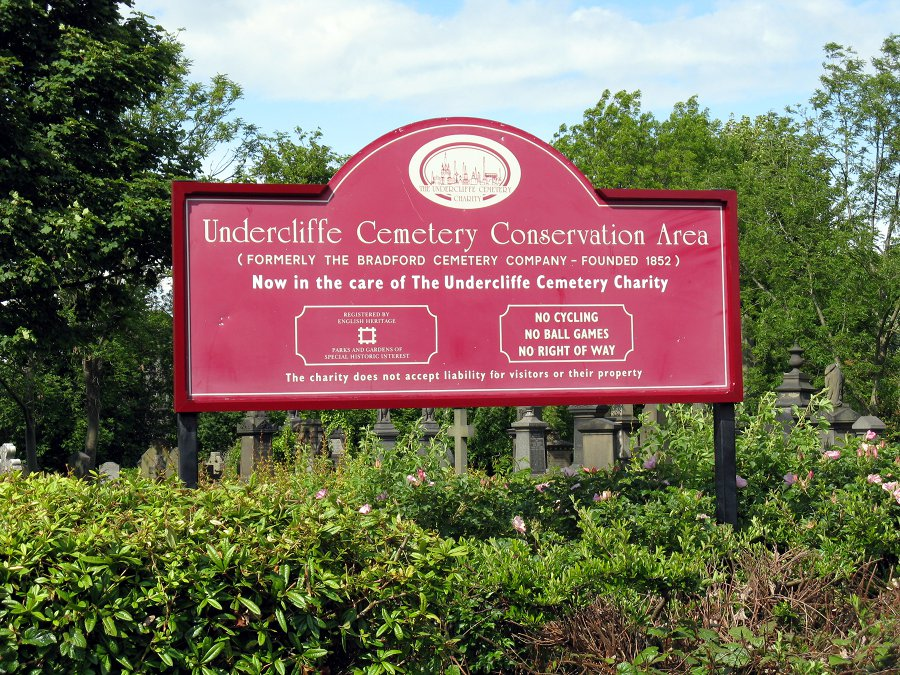
Undercliffe Cemetery Conservation Area signage

After the opening of Undercliffe cemetery several surrounding properties were built on a speculative basis; a row of houses on Undercliffe Lane known as Guy's Cliffe and properties on Undercliffe Old Road named Westfield Crescent and West View—all these properties now constitute the Undercliffe Cemetery Conservation Area (1984), one of nearly 60 such areas in Bradford. In 2025, the site was designated as a local nature reserve.

== The Undercliffe Cemetery Charity ==
The site is owned by the City of Bradford Metropolitan District Council but is operated and maintained by the 'Undercliffe Cemetery Charity' and their volunteers, and it is still an operational cemetery with ongoing burials. Approximately 30 monuments are cleaned each year to remove dirt and graffiti.

== Cultural references ==
The cemetery was used as a location in the films Billy Liar (1963), L.A. Without a Map (1998), and King Girl (TV 1998). It was also used as a location in the television series Peaky Blinders (2013). Undercliffe Cemetery was photographed by pioneering Victorian documentary photographer Samuel Smith and more recently has been a subject for anaglyph 3D photography.

== See also ==
- Listed buildings in Bradford (Bowling and Barkerend Ward)
