= John William Brackenbury =

Royal Navy officer

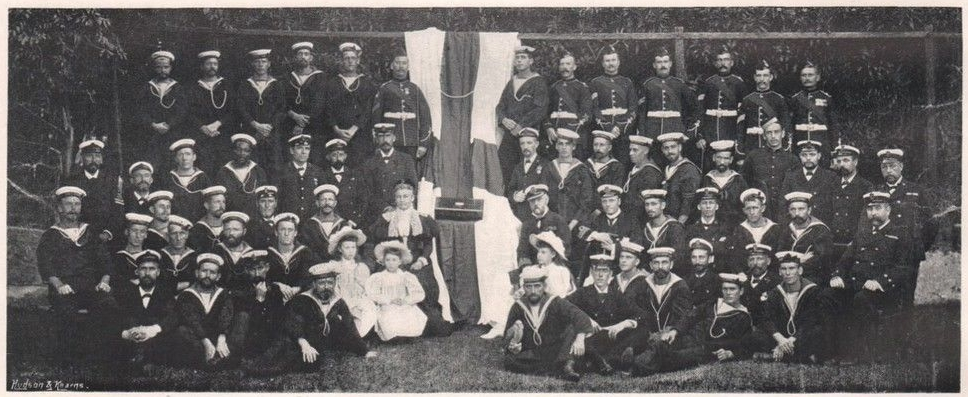
First Flag presented to Captain-in-Charge Royal Naval Dockyard, Bermuda (HMS Terror) Captain John William Brackenbury, CB, CMG at the Imperial fortress on 31 October, 1896, following his promotion to rear Admiral

Admiral John William Brackenbury, CB, CMG (30 November 1842 – 15 March 1918) was a Royal Navy officer.

The son of Vice-Admiral William Congreve Cutliffe Brackenbury, John William Brackenbury joined the Royal Navy in 1857. He was promoted to lieutenant in 1865, commander in 1876, and captain in 1881. He led a naval brigade during the Anglo-Zulu War of 1879 and was appointed CMG for his services. He also served during the Anglo-Egyptian War of 1882, receiving the Khedive's Bronze Star and the Order of the Medjidie, Third Class. He was appointed a CB in 1887 on the occasion of Queen Victoria's Golden Jubilee. He was appointed to the command of the corvette HMS Turquoise the same year. He was Captain-in-Charge at the Royal Naval Dockyard in the Imperial fortress colony of Bermuda (and in command of the Receiving ship, Bermuda, HMS Terror) from 7 June 1894 until his promotion to Rear Admiral effective 10 October 1896.
