= William Willis Wood (mayor) =

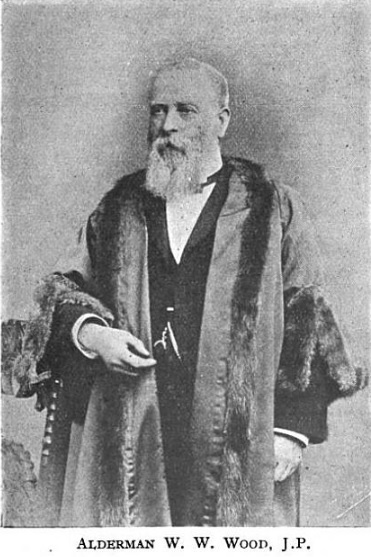

Mayor of Bradford (1894–1896)
- In office 1894–1896

Personal details
- Born: 10 July 1832 Bradford, Yorkshire, England
- Died: 2 October 1905 (aged 73) Bradford, Yorkshire, England
- Spouse: Sarah Fieldhouse (m. 25 January 1859)
- Occupation: Mill owner (worsted spinner)

William Willis Wood JP (10 July 1832 – 2 October 1905) was an owner of Junction Mills, Laisterdyke, a Wesleyan Methodist preacher and was Mayor of Bradford, Yorkshire, from 1894 to 1896.

== Background and civic life ==
William Willis Wood was born in Bradford in 1832. He attended Bradford Moor Sunday and Day School to the age of 11 when he started work in a local factory. He undertook further studies at the Bradford Mechanics' Institute. He continued to champion access to education throughout his life, supporting the Old Bradford Sunday School and serving as a secretary of the Mechanics institute. He became a co-owner of Junction Mills (worsted spinner) at Laisterdyke. Wood was elected councillor for Bradford Moor Ward in 1877 and served until November 1883. In 1883 he was elected alderman and served until November 1907. In November 1894, he was elected Mayor of Bradford and served until November 1896. Wood represented Bradford City Council on the Board of Bradford Grammar School. He resided at Greenhill House on Leeds Road in Bradford in what is now Saint Peter's Presbytery. He died in 1905 and is buried in Bowling Cemetery in Bradford. Wood Was succeeded in office by Thomas Speight (1844–1921), who was Mayor of Bradford from 1896 to 1898.

== Personal life ==
Notably, his eldest son, Arthur Wood (1861–1905) married Thomas Speight's daughter, Annie, in 1889. Their only son, Stanley Speight Wood (1889–1918), served in the Royal Army Service Corps and died in Baghdad, Mesopotamia, in the First World War.
