= Eccleshill, Bradford =

Area of Bradford, West Yorkshire, England

Coordinates: 53.824°N 1.737°W

Eccleshill
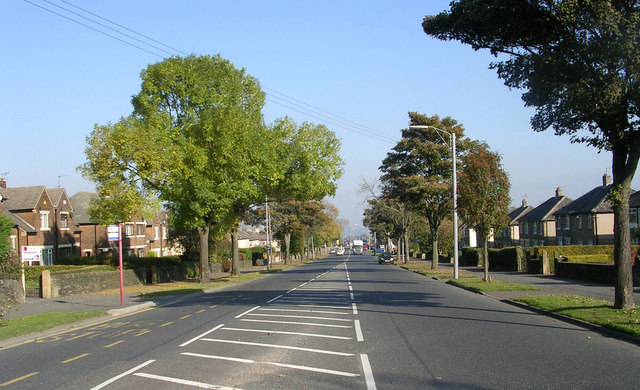
- Harrogate Road, Eccleshill

- Location within West Yorkshire
- Population: 17,945 (Ward. 2011 census)
- OS grid reference: SE175358
- Metropolitan borough: City of Bradford
- Metropolitan county: West Yorkshire
- Region: Yorkshire and the Humber
- Country: England
- Sovereign state: United Kingdom
- Post town: BRADFORD
- Postcode district: BD2
- Dialling code: 01274
- Police: West Yorkshire
- Fire: West Yorkshire
- Ambulance: Yorkshire
- UK Parliament: Bradford East
- Councillors: Geoffrey Reid (Liberal Democrats); Nicola Pollard (Liberal Democrats); Brendan Stubbs (Liberal Democrats)

Eccleshill is an area, former village, and ward within the Bradford district, in the county of West Yorkshire, England. The ward population of Eccleshill was 17,945 at the 2011 Census. Eccleshill is a more or less completely residential urban area with very little open space although there is substantial open land directly to the east.

The origins of the name Eccleshill are uncertain. At the time of the Domesday Book the area was known as Egleshill either meaning 'eagles hill', or perhaps named after a Saxon landlord called Aikel or Eckil—alternatively it could mean Ecclesiastical Hill.

== History ==
In Roman times the Eccleshill area was crossed by two lanes. One lane was along what is now Norman Lane and the other to Apperley Bridge down the road now known as Bank.

After the Norman Conquest the lands of Eccleshill were given to William, Earl of Warren. In 1274 ownership of lands passed to the Sheffields and in 1407 to the Bolling family of Calverley then the Scargills, Saviles, Wyatts, Zouches, Stanhopes, Hirds, and then to Jeremiah Rawson.

In the Middle Ages Eccleshill was shunned by church authorities after a supposed incident in which it is said a preacher or monk was stoned to death on the main road though Eccleshill village. This supposed incident is said to be the reason behind naming the main road 'Stony Lane'. The real explanation may be that either the road was stony or that it led on to Stone Hall.

=== Eccleshill Hall ===
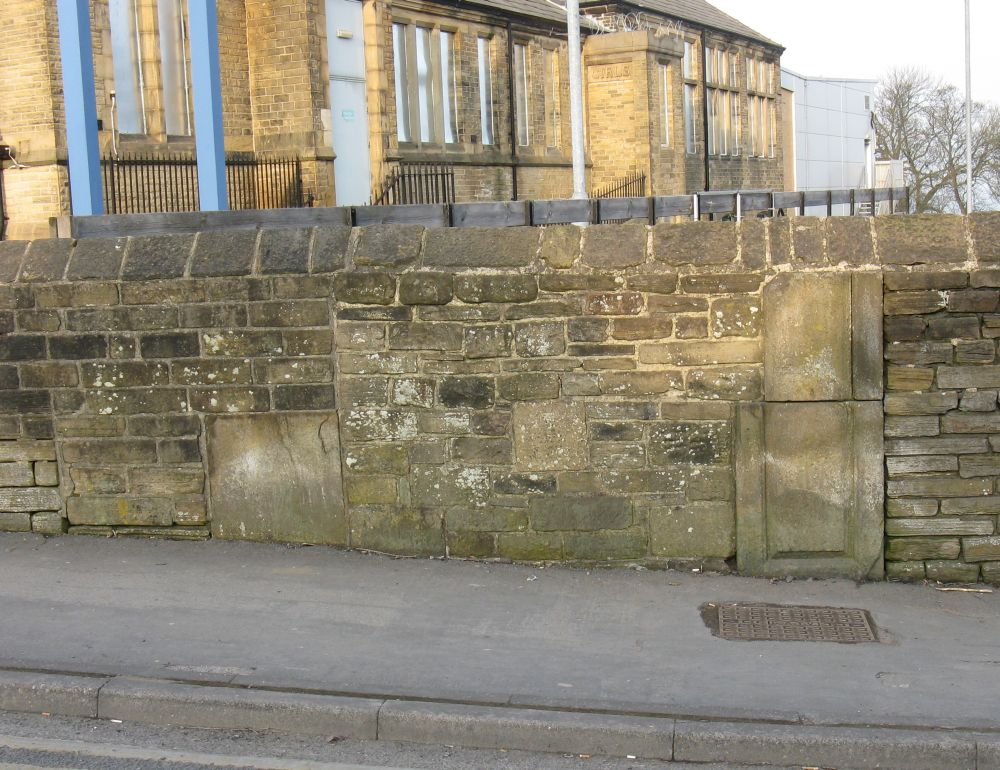
The remains of gateposts to Eccleshill Hall embedded in a wall

In 1713 Eccleshill Hall was built for Dr Stanhope, located to the east of Stony Lane at the site of previous Eccleshill Halls, on what is now Victoria Road. The hall was demolished in 1878 and all that remains are parts of stone gateposts embedded in a roadside wall.

=== Church history ===
Initially the churches built in Eccleshill were nonconformist. Before 1775 the only place of worship in Eccleshill was a Quaker Meeting House on Tunwell Lane. In 1775 Prospect Chapel also known as Bank Top Chapel a Wesleyan Chapel was constructed on Lands Lane off Norman Lane. In 1776 Methodist John Wesley (1703-1791) preached there.

On the opposite side of Norman Lane is Prospect Chapel burial ground, created in 1823. Doctrinal disagreement led to a split and the establishment in 1823 of Salem Independent Chapel. Salem Chapel and Sunday school both now demolished, were built on Dobby Row, an event that was to prompt the renaming of the street to Chapel Street. The Chapel Street chapel was eventually replaced by the Congregational Church on Victoria Road near Harrogate Road, built in 1889. Salem Chapel burial ground remains on Chapel Street. The Congregational Church was demolished in the 1960s and the United Reformed Church, a single storey building built on the site in 1967 and the Congregational Church building was demolished in 1979/80.

A further split at Prospect Chapel had led to the establishment of Eccleshill United Methodist Chapel on the corner of Workhouse fold now named Stewart Close. In 1854 the remaining worshippers of Prospect Chapel built Eccleshill Wesleyan Methodist Chapel in Stony Lane and sold Prospect Chapel. The old Prospect Chapel building had many subsequent uses including as an organ works. When congregations shrank at the Wesleyan Methodist Church on Stony Lane worshippers moved to join the Primitive Methodist Chapel built in 1911 on Norman Lane to become Eccleshill Methodist Church. The Eccleshill Methodist Church has now been demolished and there are plans to replace it with apartments. The Wesleyan Methodist Chapel was sold in 1965 and then became a Ukrainian Autocephalic Orthodox Church.

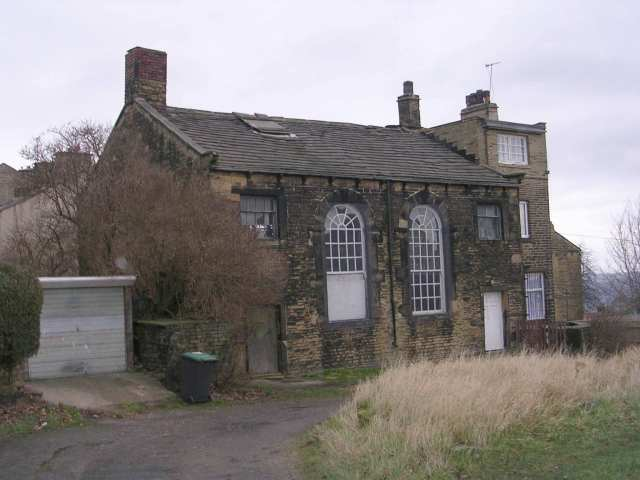
The former Prospect Chapel^{*} (1775), Lands Lane

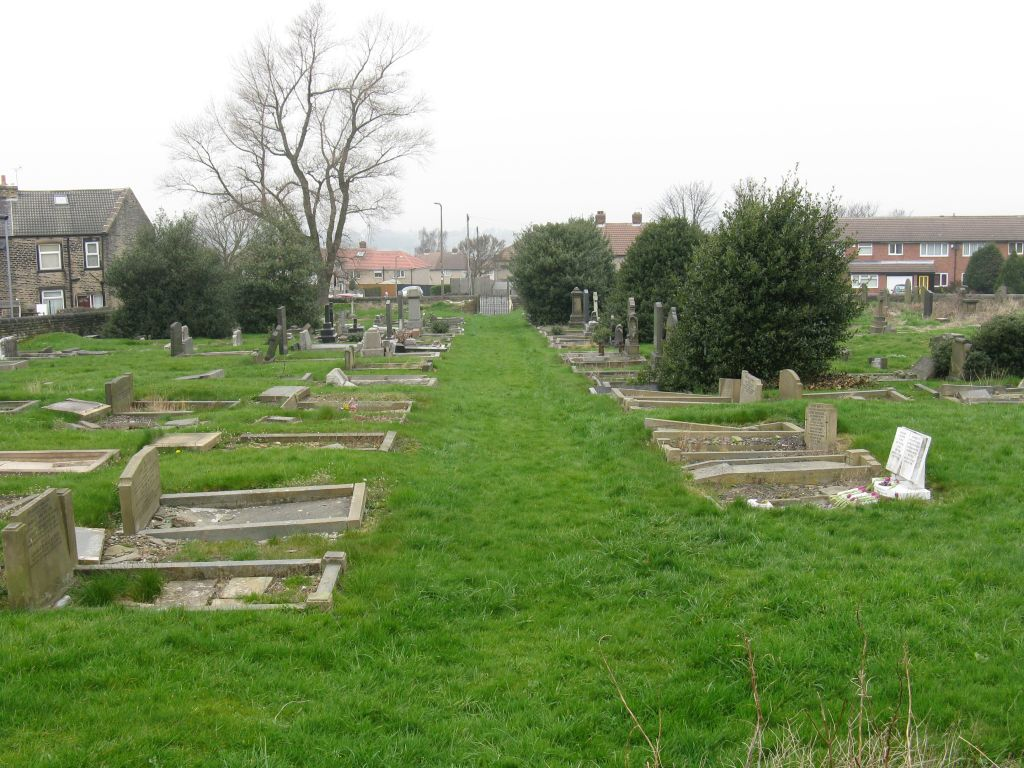
Prospect Chapel Burial Ground (1823), Norman Lane

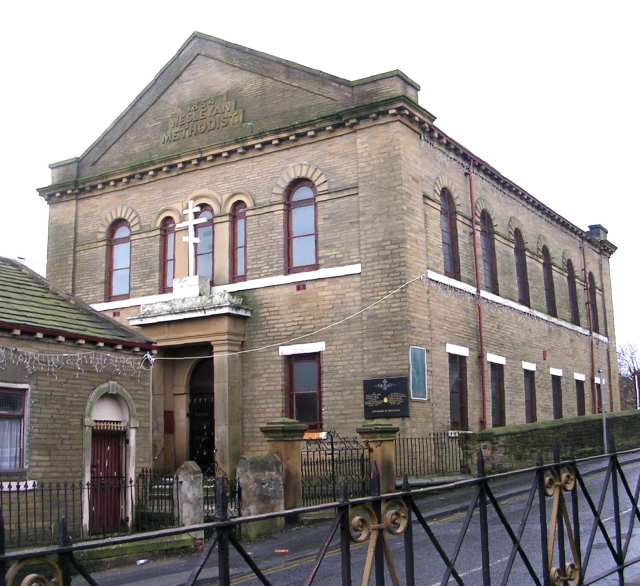
The Ukrainian Autocephalic Orthodox Church^{*} (1854), Stony Lane.

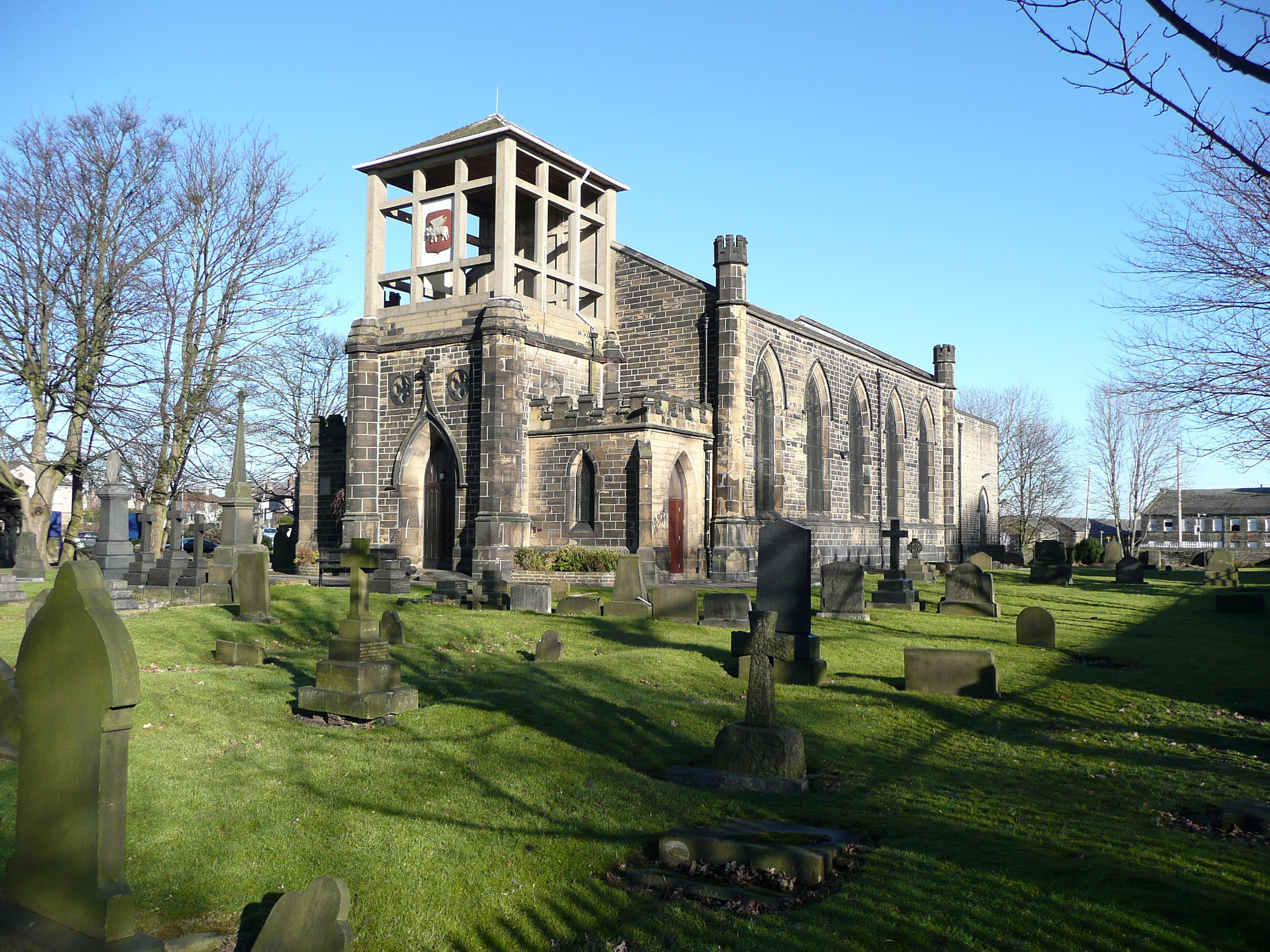
St. Luke's Church (1848), Harrogate Road

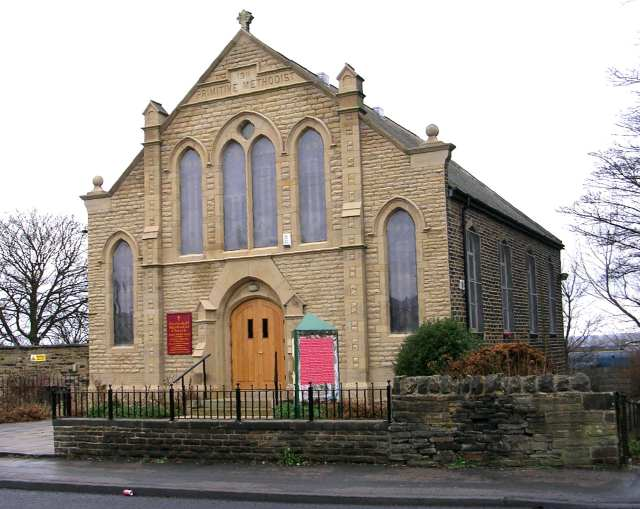
Eccleshill Methodist Church (1911-2016), Norman Lane

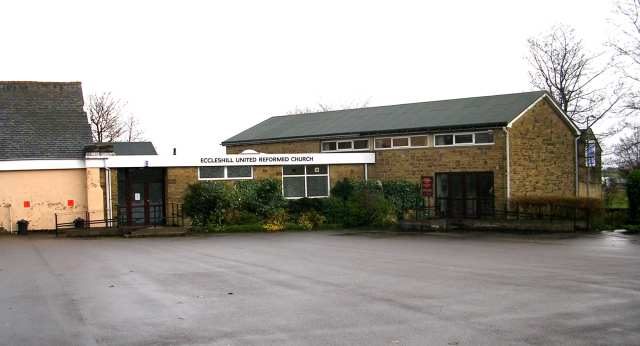
Eccleshill United Reformed Church, Victoria Road
^{*} listed building

Construction of St. Luke's Church was ordered by the Rev William Scoresby, Vicar of Bradford, and this was consecrated in 1848. It was designed in a vertical Gothic style with a spire, however, the spire was removed circa 1971 when the stonework began crumbling.

The ecclesiastical parish of Eccleshill takes in Greengates, and Apperley Bridge south of the River Aire.

=== Industrial, commercial and transport history ===
The quarrying, pottery, spinning and weaving industries have been located in the area for some time but only quarrying remains today.

==== Wool and mills ====
Eccleshill has a number of mills. The Old Mill on Victoria Road was a woollen mill built in 1800 but was destroyed by fire in 1816. The present building on the site is dated 1863 although parts of it date back to the early 1800s. On the other side of Victoria Road from the Old Mill is a row of houses and street once known as Dobby Row - a dobby being a type of cloth, a type of loom or part of an early form of weaving loom taking its name from a corruption of the words 'draw boy' - a weaving assistant.

In around 1816 Union Mill on Harrogate Road was constructed for the manufacture of woollens. From 1892 to 1983 John Pilley and Sons owned and operated the mills A further three storey mill building known as Pilley's Mill was added to the south of the site. Union Mills had a serious fire in 1905. In 2019 both mills were demolished and the site cleared to make way for a retail complex.

In the 1838 White's Directory Eccleshill is described as engaged in the manufacture of white woollen cloth. In 1872 Tunwell Mill was built by Messrs Smith and Hutton as a woollen mill near Tun Well (Town Well) directly south of Stony Lane—although today's Tunwell Mills are not the original mill building.

At the north end of Stone Hall Road is a mill variously known as Stone Hall Shed and Whiteley's Mill where worsted was manufactured. Halfway down Stone Hall Road off to the west stood Victoria Mill, a worsted mill. This mill has been demolished and domestic properties now stand on the site.

Moorside Mills was built on Moorside Road in 1875 by John Moore for worsted spinning. In 1919 two floors were added and a clock tower as a war memorial to those who had died in the First World War. Ownership of the mill changed hands many times and in 1970 the City of Bradford Metropolitan District Council bought the property from Messrs. W. & J. Whitehead to create the Bradford Industrial Museum.

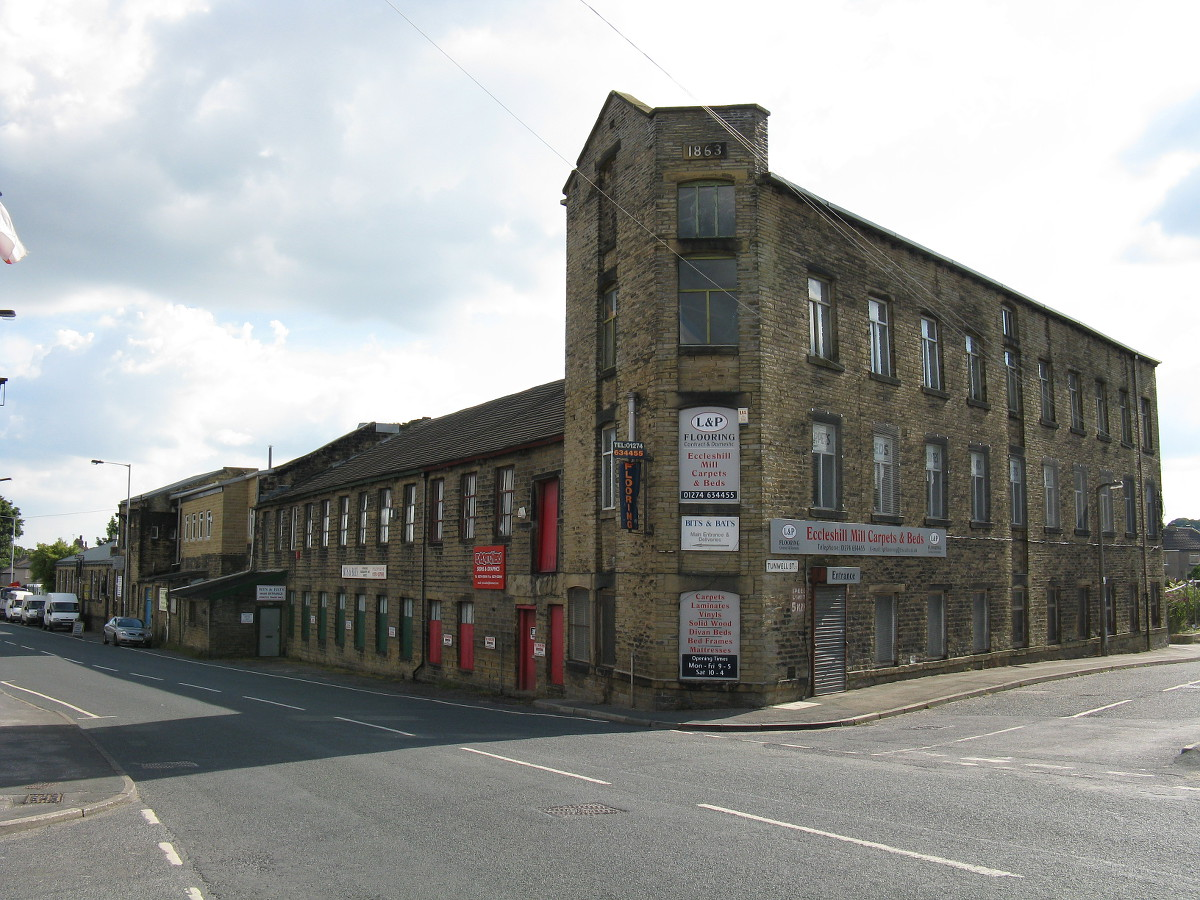
The Old Mill, Victoria Road

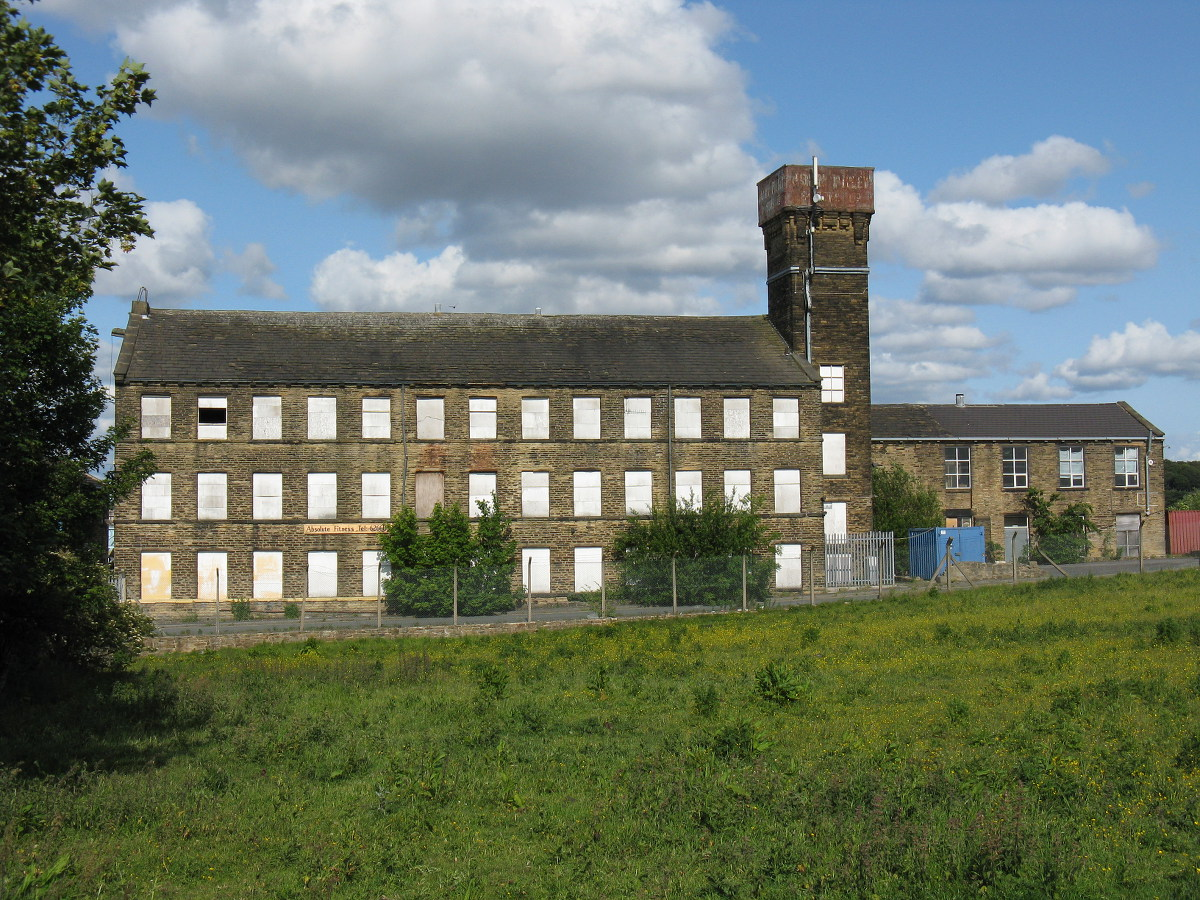
Union Mills / Pilley's Mill building (demolished 2019), Harrogate Road

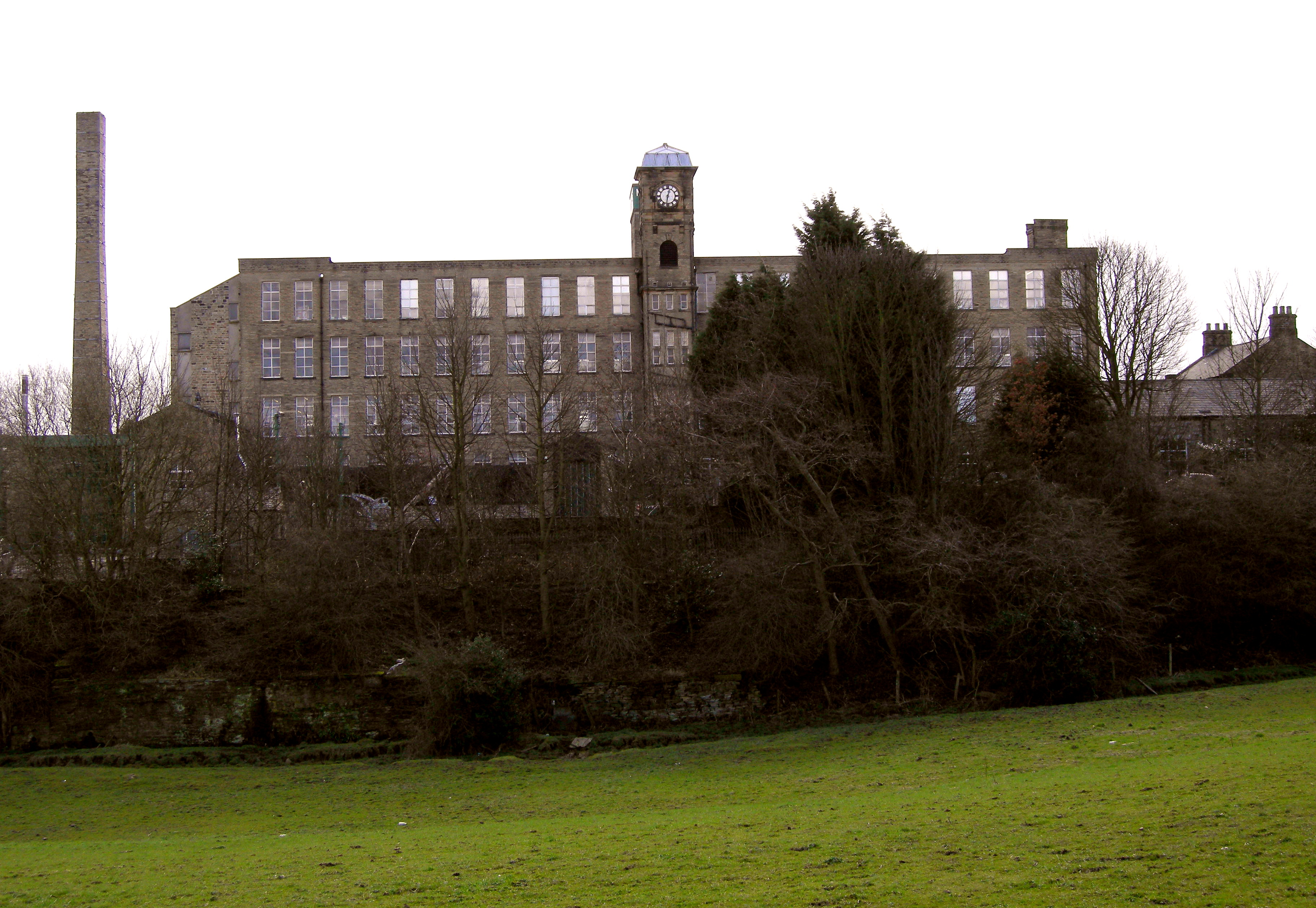
Moorside Mills building (1875), Moorside Road

==== Pottery ====
In 1837, the Manor Pottery was established by Jeremiah Rawson, lord of the manor on a site east of the Undercliffe Road-Pullan Avenue junction using beds of shale, fireclay and coal at a deep quarry near Bolton Junction at a site now partly occupied by Kents Fitness Gym. There was a rail tunnel under Leeds Road, then known as Pottery Lane, with waggons carrying clay and minerals from the quarry to the pottery on the other side of the road. Manor Pottery produced a salt glazed brown stoneware, household utensils, brown and cream crockery, ornaments, garden vases, busts, and statuettes although these did not bear any distinguishing marks. Although the product stood comparison with other local wares, the local market for pottery was eventually supplied by better and cheaper stoneware from Staffordshire, and by 1867 the pottery had been sold to William Woodhead and production switched over to house bricks, firebricks and sewer pipes. The kilns were shut down in the early 20th century, and in 1921 the chimney was demolished, however the manor house still remains.

==== Coal pits ====
There were numerous coal pits in what is now the Thorpe Edge and Ravenscliffe areas of the Eccleshill ward. This coal was required for steam powered machinery and the pottery. Unfortunately the digging of the coal pits caused many local water wells to run dry.

==== Eccleshill Mechanics' Institute ====
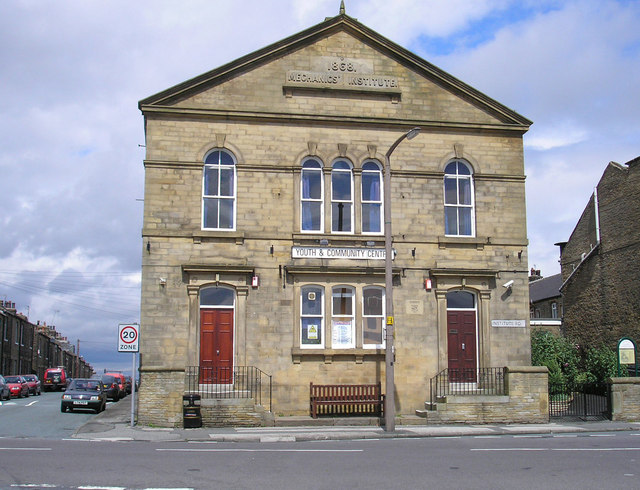
The former Eccleshill Mechanics' Institute^{*} (1868), Stone Hall Road

Eccleshill Mechanics' Institute on Stone Hall Road was built in 1868. Charles Bottomley converted the upper floor of the Eccleshill Mechanics' Institute into a 359-seat picture hall which he named Eccleshill Picture House and then opened in 1911. Shortly after this the cinema was renamed 'Picture Palace' but closed in 1931 never running any 'talkies'. Before construction of the building the institute used to meet in the now demolished school buildings at the western end of Chapel Street on a site now occupied by Eccleshill Victoria Conservative Club.

==== Shopping ====
For the last two hundred years the shopping centre for Eccleshill has been Stony Lane and it was here that Henry Sparks, founder of Sparks Bakeries, had his first shop.

==== Transport history ====
In 1804 the Dudley Hill to Killinghall turnpike was constructed. Parts of this are now Killinghall Road and Harrogate Road. In 1889 Mill Lane, Town Lane and Town Street were renamed Victoria Road to mark the Golden Jubilee of Queen Victoria that year. The tram service came from central Bradford up Bolton Road then Stone Hall Road to a terminus in front of the Eccleshill Mechanics Institute. The tram service also went along Harrogate road to Greengates but because of the low rail bridge at Eccleshill Station only low profile double decker trams and buses could get under.

===== The railway and Eccleshill Railway Station =====
In 1874 the Great Northern Railway opened its Laisterdyke - Shipley branch (the Shipley and Windhill line), a six-mile double track branch line from Quarry Gap junction in Thornbury to Shipley and Windhill railway station, passing Eccleshill, Idle and Thackley railway stations. Eccleshill railway station opened in 1875 with its sidings and coal yard. This was located just north of the rail bridge crossing over Harrogate Road. Only the embankment and abutment of one side of the rail bridge remain. The former Station Hotel on Harrogate Road took its name from its proximity to the railway station. The railway station closed to passengers in 1931 although goods traffic continued on the line until 1964. Subsequently, the line was taken up and the bridge demolished.

==== The Palladium/Regal cinema ====
In 1928 Ralph Dickinson created the purpose-built 1,000 seat Palladium Cinema on Norman Lane, opened in 1929. Later the cinema changed ownership and in 1931 the new owner John Lambert altered the name to Regal. In 1958 the cinema closed for refurbishment and updating, and reopened later that year, but closed finally in 1966. Later with the construction of an extra internal floor the building was used as a bingo hall, a snooker hall and then a fitness centre.

=== Schools history ===
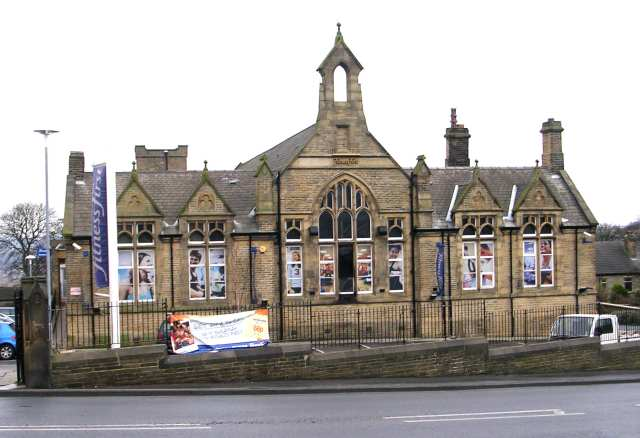
The former Central Board / Hutton School (1884-2016)

The school on Fagley Lane was built in 1845. The school in Chapel Street (1875) was declared unsuitable in 1884 and to replace it the Central Board School was built on Victoria Road in 1887 on the site of the old Eccleshill Hall. In 1889 the Central Board School was renamed Hutton School after the chairman of the School Board; John Hutton who bought the land of Eccleshill Hall for the purpose of building the Central Board School. After a period as a fitness centre the building was demolished in 2016 to make way for housing, despite a campaign to save the building form demolition which was unsuccessful.

== Geography ==
Eccleshill is bounded in the east by Pudsey and Fagley Beck— flowing a short distance directly north under the name Carr Beck to meet the River Aire. To the north of Eccleshill is the village of Idle and to the north-east is Greengates and Thorpe Edge. In the City of Leeds is Calverley. To the east across Fagley Beck is Pudsey in the City of Leeds and to the south-east Bradford Moor. To the south is the ward of Undercliffe and round to the south-west is Bolton and Ashbourne. To the north-west is Five Lane Ends and to the north and further along is Idle Moor and Wrose.

=== Fagley ===
Fagley is an area to the south-east of Eccleshill ward. The local economy includes a sandstone quarry, and a riding school. Most of the shops including the post office are on Fagley Road running east–west. Fagley no longer has any public houses. The local school is Fagley Primary School and in the east of Fagley is the Fagley Youth and Community Centre. Further east is Fagley Beck and the Leeds Country Way bridle path and the border with Pudsey.

=== Moorside ===
Moorside is a residential area located within the Eccleshill electoral ward in Bradford, within the BD2 postcode district. The area is signposted from the Bradford Ring Road and Harrogate Road (A658) and is served by local buses, such as the 645 from Market Street or Hall Ings in central Bradford.

The Moorside area transitioned from rural moorland into a pivotal industrial hub during the 19th century. Its history is anchored by Moorside Mills, established in 1875 by John Moore for worsted spinning, which drove the development of local worker housing and owner villas like Moorside House. The area flourished as a centerpiece of the global wool trade, with the mill expanding significantly after World War I to include its iconic memorial clock tower. In 1970, as the textile industry declined, the site was saved by the local council and transformed into the Bradford Industrial Museum, which opened in 1974. This move preserved the area’s identity, showcasing everything from original textile machinery to relocated Victorian back-to-back cottages.

== Landmarks ==
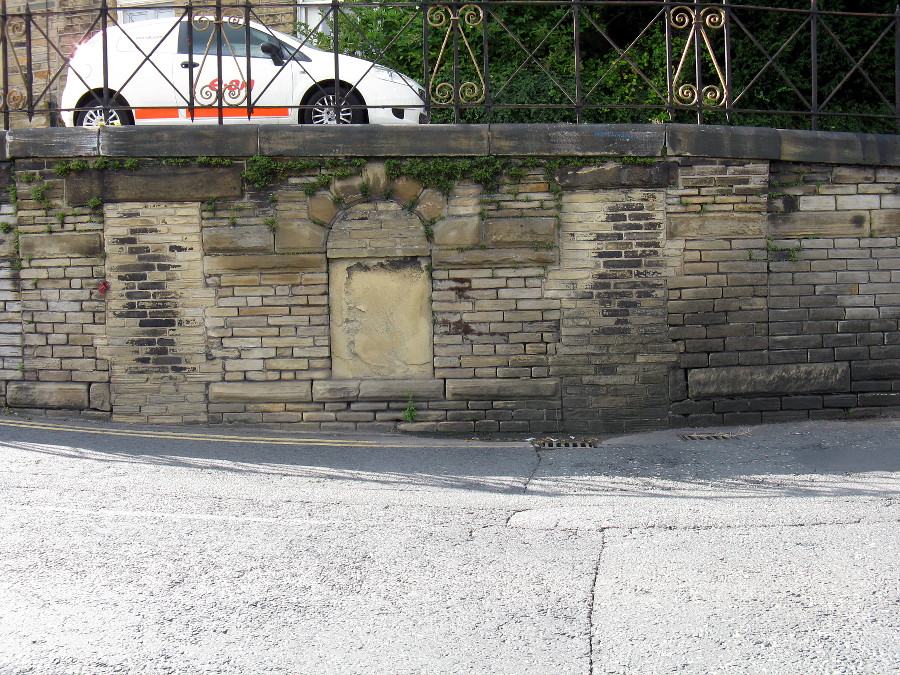
The Monkey Bridge

At the junction of Stony Lane and Victoria Road by the roadside was the 19th century lock-up and a public urinal, however these have been walled up for some considerable time. The lock-up and urinal are now over-topped by a section of raised stone paved pavement with railings known as 'The Monkey Bridge' overlooking a small triangular area of land at the road junction that was the site of the village stocks.

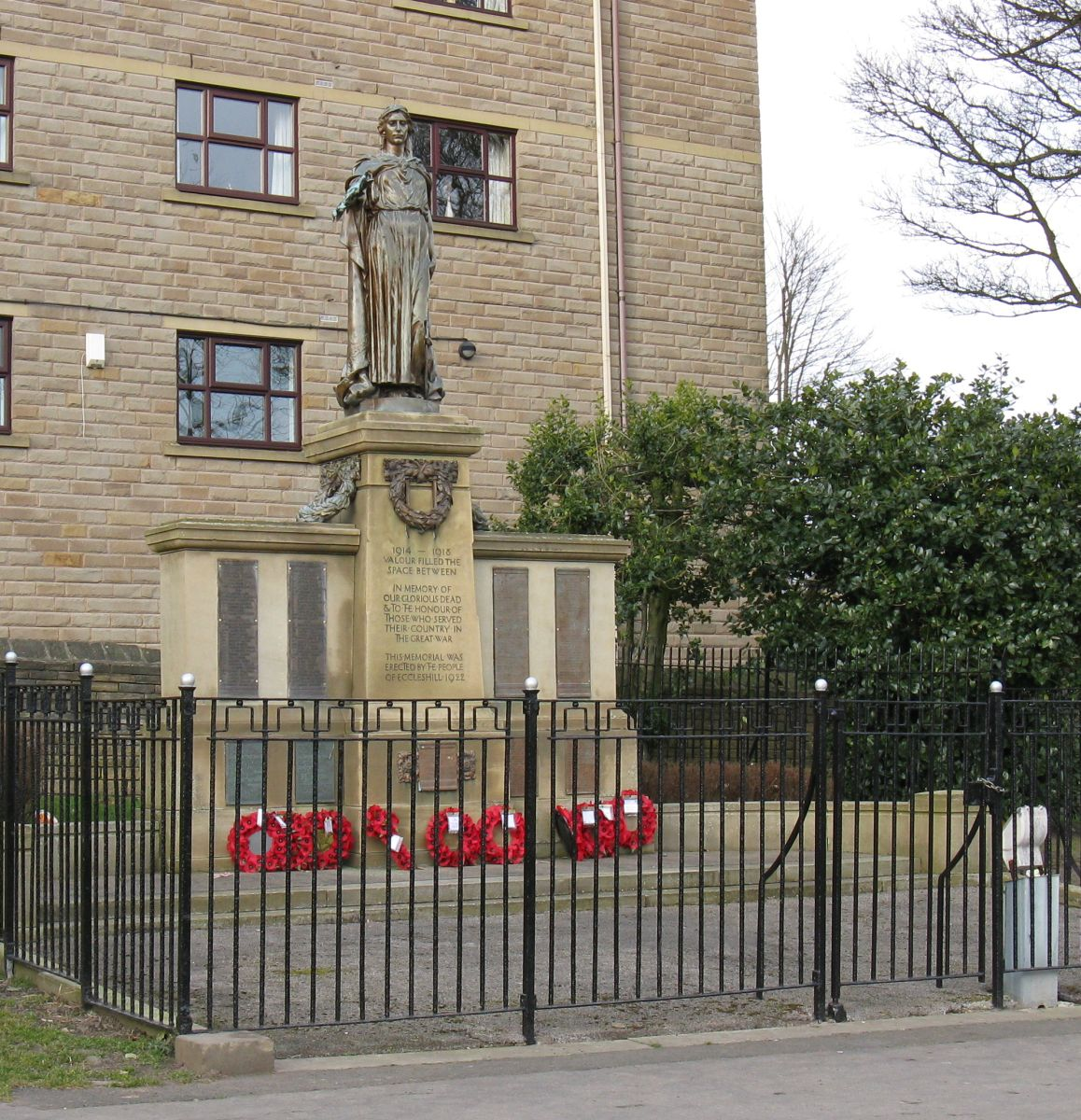
Eccleshill War Memorial

North of Stony Lane is the former Stoney Lane Quarry now a recreation ground known as The Delph, a grassed area with a fenced children's play ground and triangulation pillar. South of Stony Lane is a grassed recreation ground or common with Village Green Status. Cricket and football were played here but more suitable grounds became available. Eccleshill War Memorial is on the northern side and to the south of the Recreation Ground on Moorwell Place is a terrace of listed former weavers' houses and a bowling green.

There are many historic wells in Eccleshill, e.g. Moor Well, and Tun Well however there is a Holy Well covered by a manhole cover, located in a private garden off Harrogate Road opposite the end of Ravenscliffe Avenue, close to the site of Eccleshill Railway Station. This historic well and its associated grove dates back to Roman times.

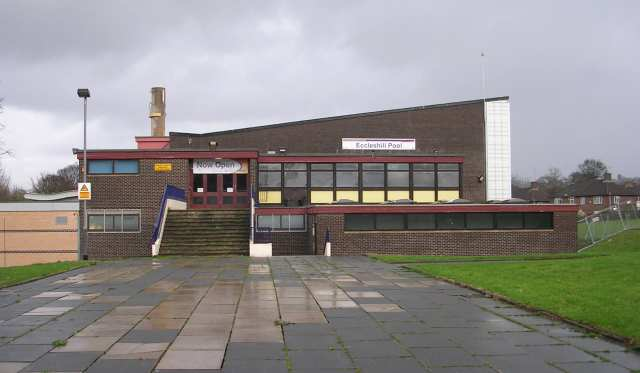
Eccleshill Pool

The Eccleshill (Swimming) Pool is located on Harrogate Road towards Greengates.

To the east of Harrogate Road can be found the Eccleshill NHS Treatment Centre, and playing fields.

East of the playing fields is the Eccleshill Community Hospital, Eccleshill Park—an area of grassland, and the Eccleshill Adventure Playground.

Eccleshill has four post offices, one on Harrogate Road, one in Fagley and others in Ravenscliffe and Thorpe Edge. There is also a driving test centre on Victoria Road. Eccleshill Police Station is not in Eccleshill ward but just outside in Idle.

Eccleshill has a number of public houses particularly along Victoria Road and Norman Lane, however several public houses along Harrogate Road have closed in recent years.

Listed buildings

Eccleshill's listed buildings (of which there are 34; more than any other district besides Saltaire and Little Germany in the City Centre) include private houses on Moorside Road, the Ukrainian Autocephalic Orthodox church, a public house and a private house on Stony Lane, private houses on Stone Hall Road and Back Stone Hall Road, listed farmhouses and former farmhouses on Fagley Lane and Fagley Road, listed three-storey former weavers' houses (1851–54) on Moorwell Place, and a listed former Wesleyan chapel (1775) on Lands Lane. and the Manor House off Leeds Road.

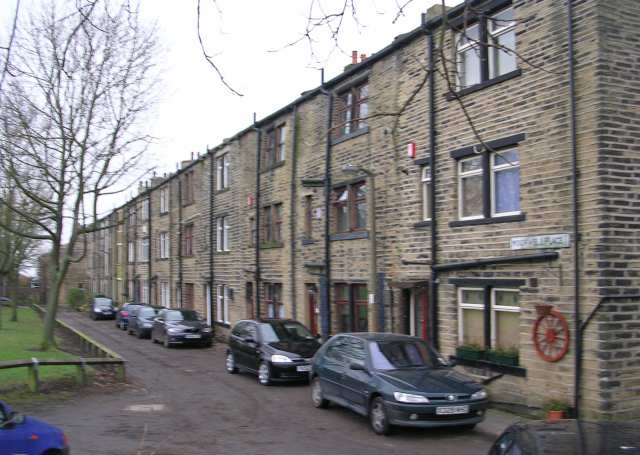
Terrace of former weavers houses in Moorwell Place

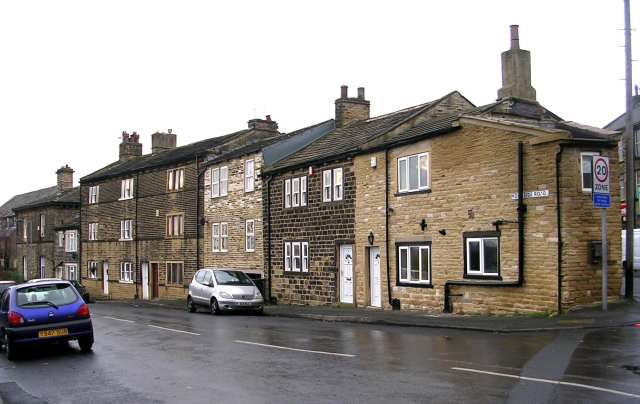
Some listed buildings on Moorside Road

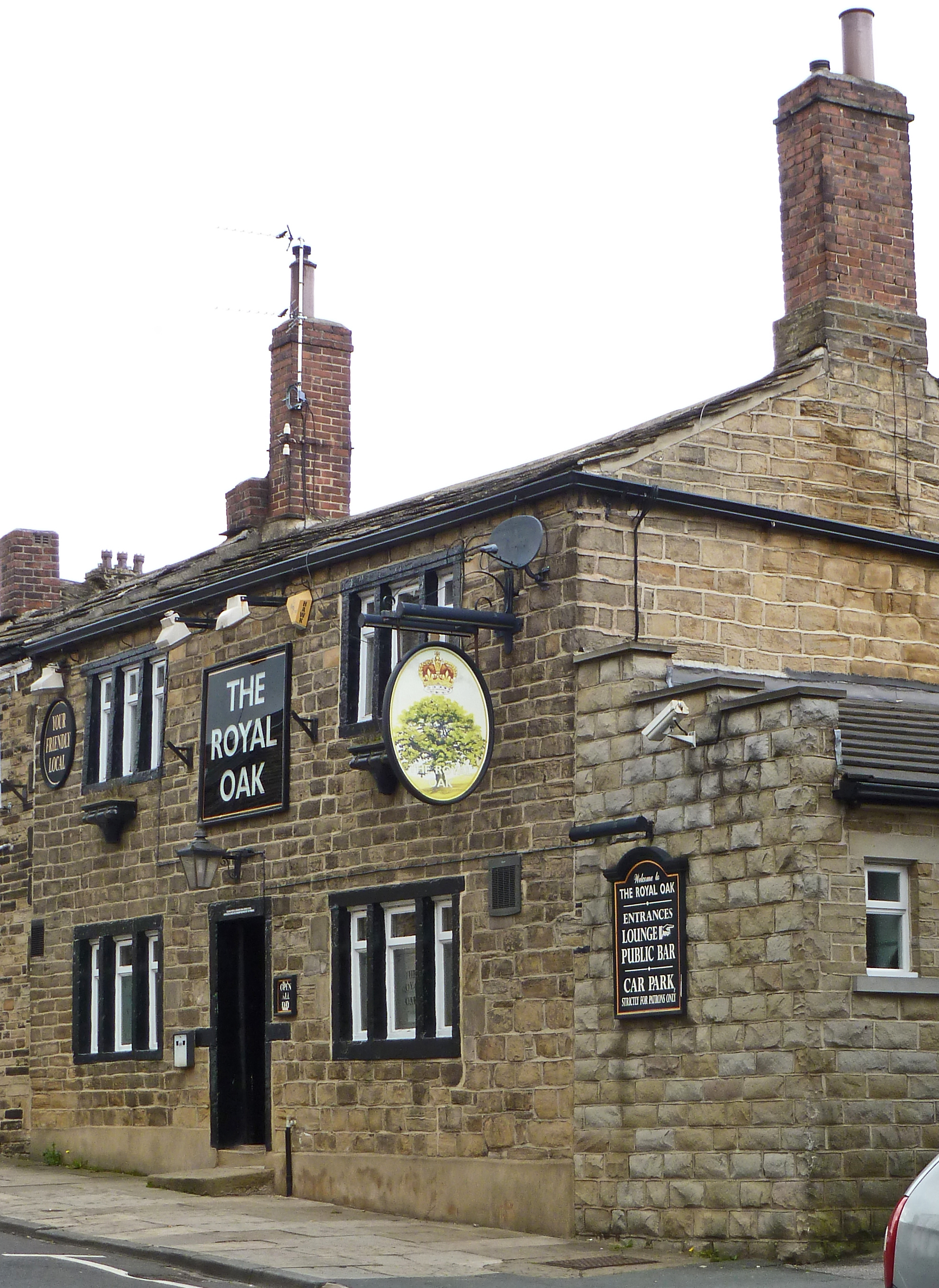
The Royal Oak, Stony Lane

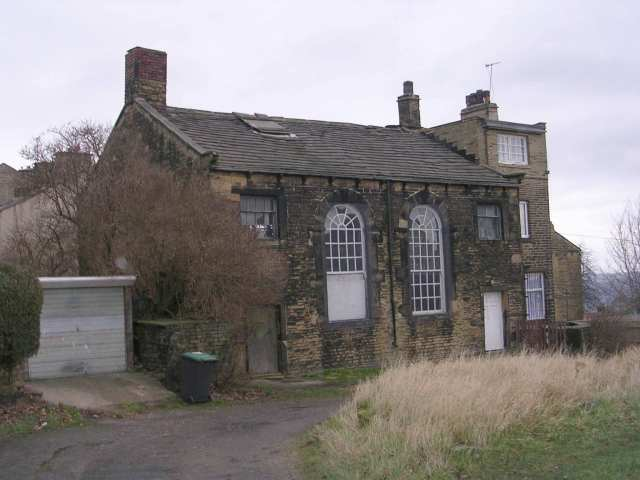
The former Prospect Chapel (1775), Lands Lane

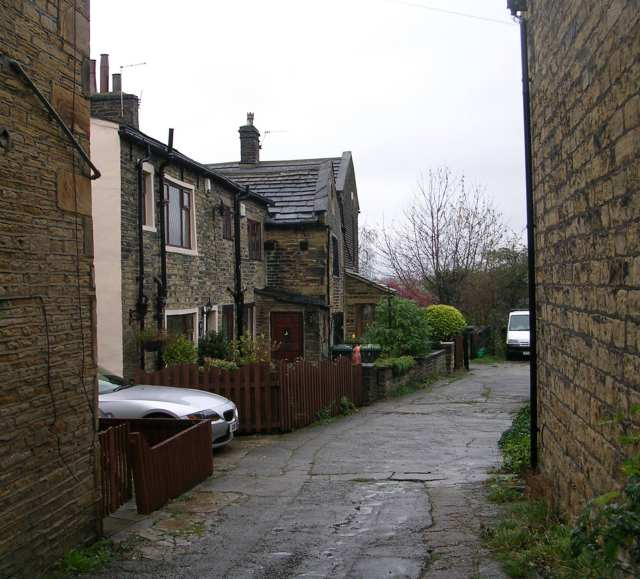
Listed buildings in Haigh Fold, Moorside Road

=== Bradford Industrial Museum ===
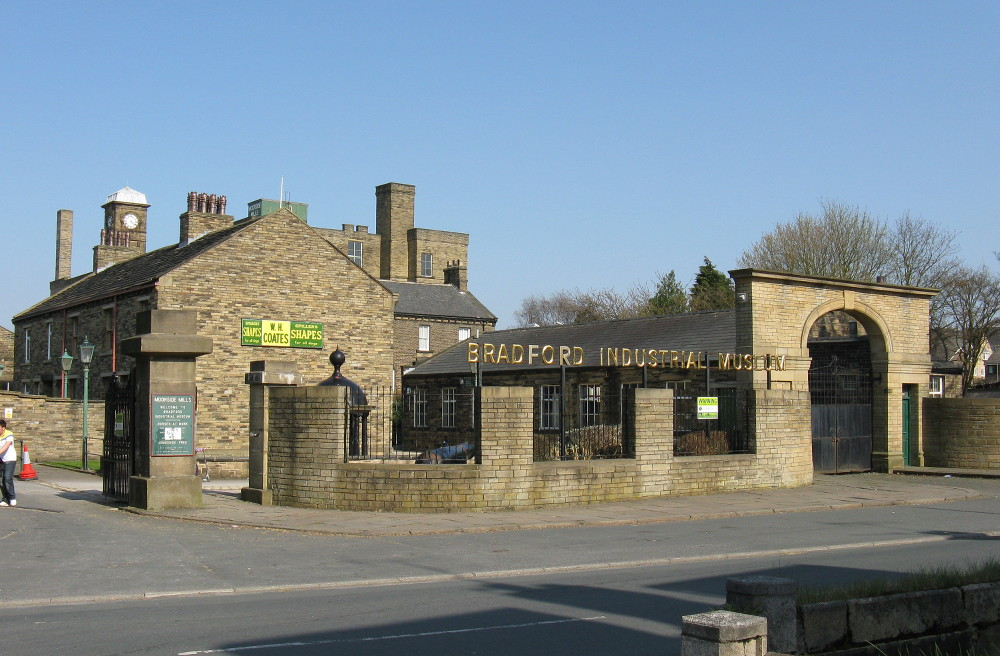
Entrance to Bradford Industrial Museum on Moorside Road

In the south of Eccleshill off Moorside Road close to Fagley is the Bradford Industrial Museum in what was Moorside Mills. This museum houses machinery from local textile and printing industries and has a row of workers houses. It used to house the popular Horses at Work exhibition but this has now closed.

=== Churches ===
Originally built in 1854 as a Wesleyan Methodist Church, the Ukrainian Autocephalic Orthodox church is the only listed church building in Eccleshill. Tucked behind this church is a former Wesleyan Sunday School of 1885, now residential accommodation.

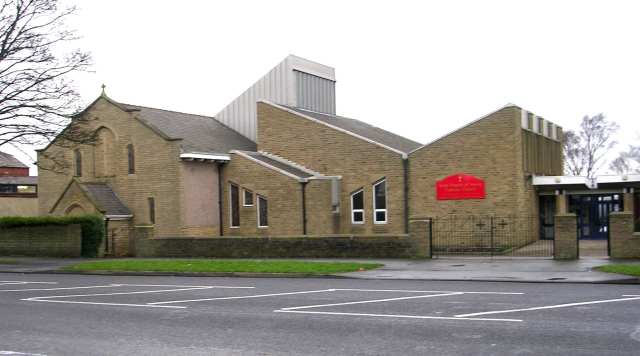
St. Francis' Catholic Church, Norman Lane

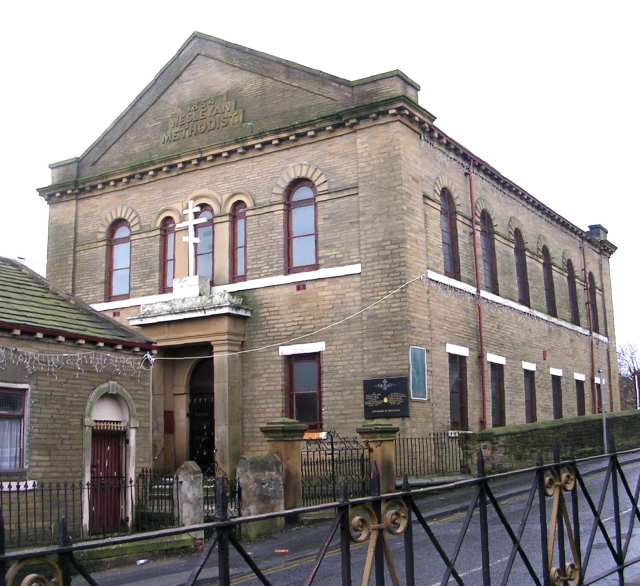
The Ukrainian Autocephalic Orthodox Church^{*} (1854), Stony Lane.

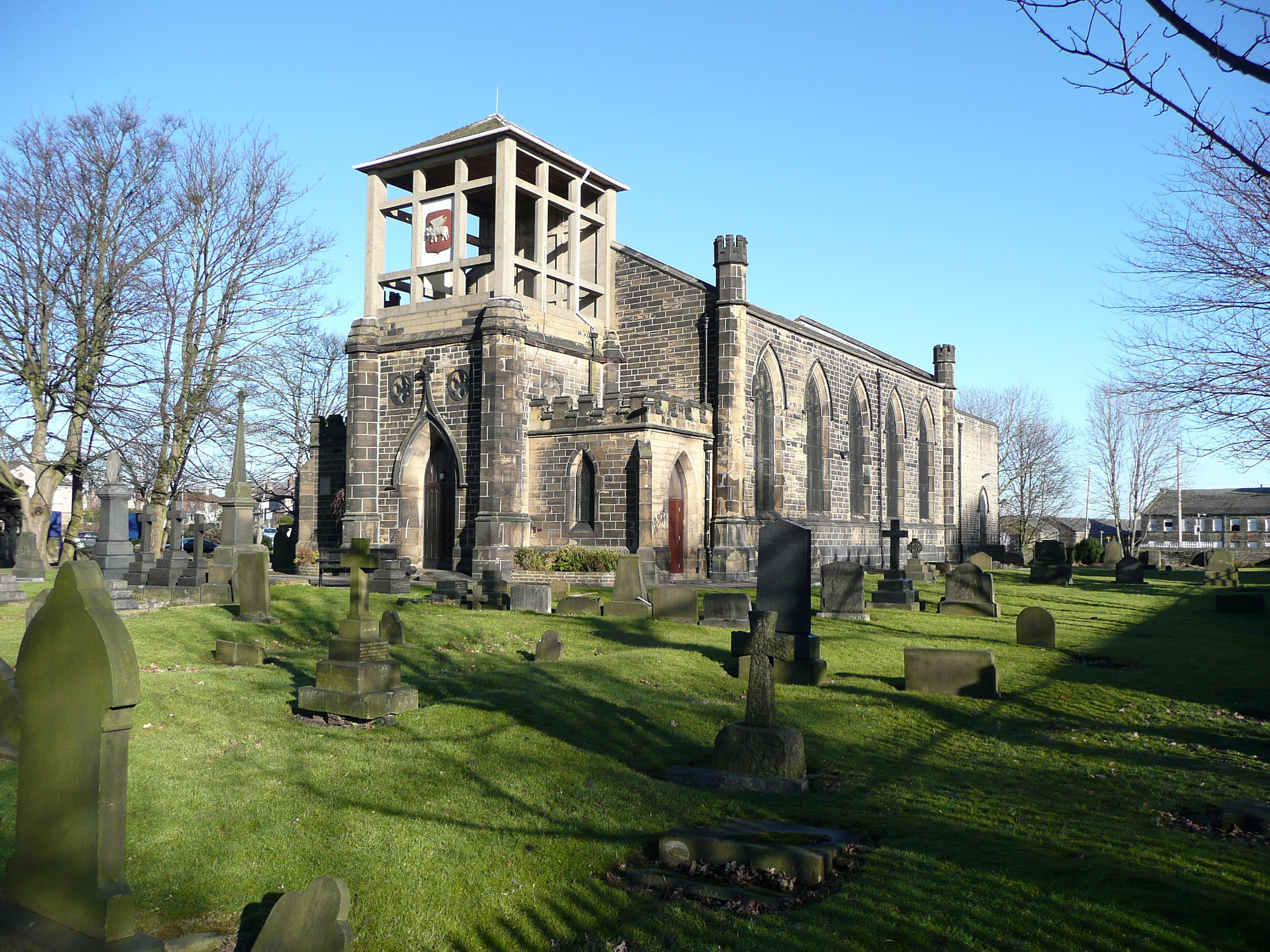
St. Luke's Church (1848), Harrogate Road

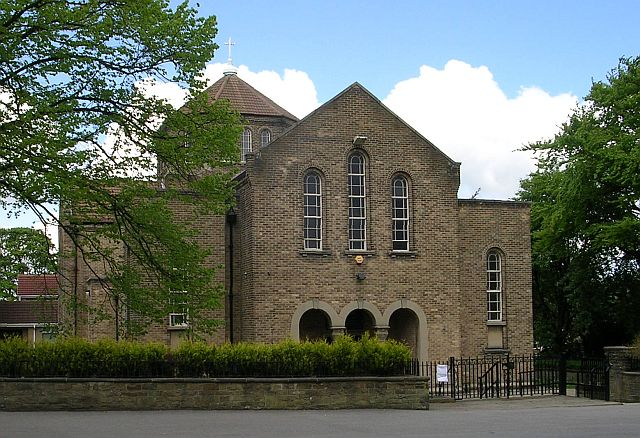
St. Clare's Catholic Church, Fagley Road
^{*} listed building

== Governance ==
Eccleshill was formerly a township and chapelry in the parish of Bradford, in 1866 Eccleshill became a separate civil parish. From 1894 to 1899 Eccleshill was an urban district. In 1951 the parish had a population of 18,480.

As of 2004, Eccleshill ward includes the south-east quadrant of Greengates, Thorpe Edge housing estate, part of Five Lane Ends, Bank Top, the eponymous Eccleshill, Fagley, Moorside and the Ravenscliffe housing estate.

Councillors

Eccleshill electoral ward is represented on Bradford Council by three Liberal Democrat councillors, Geoff Reid, Nicola Pollard and Brendan Stubbs.

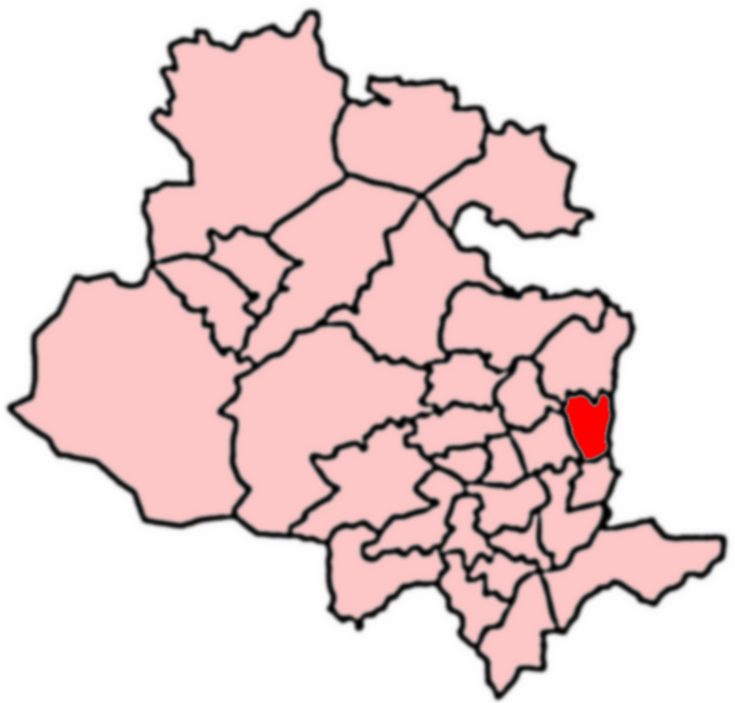
2004 Boundaries of Eccleshill Ward.

Election	Councillor	Councillor	Councillor
2004	Anne-Marie Benson (Lab)	Carol Beardmore (Lib Dem)	Dorothy Ann Wallace (Lib Dem)
2006	Colin McPhee (Lib Dem)	Carol Beardmore (Lib Dem)	Ann Wallace (Lib Dem)
2007	Colin McPhee (Lib Dem)	Carol Beardmore (Lib Dem)	Ann Wallace (Lib Dem)
2008	Colin McPhee (Lib Dem)	Carol Beardmore (Lib Dem)	Ann Wallace (Lib Dem)
2010	Geoff Reid (Lib Dem)	Carol Beardmore (Lib Dem)	Ann Wallace (Lib Dem)
2011	Geoff Reid (Lib Dem)	Ruth Billheimer (Lab)	Ann Wallace (Lib Dem)
2012	Geoff Reid (Lib Dem)	Ruth Billheimer (Lab)	Ann Wallace (Lib Dem)
2014	Geoff Reid (Lib Dem)	Ruth Billheimer (Lab)	Ann Wallace (Lib Dem)
2015	Geoff Reid (Lib Dem)	Nicola Pollard (Lib Dem)	Ann Wallace (Lib Dem)
2016	Geoff Reid (Lib Dem)	Nicola Pollard (Lib Dem)	Brendan Robert Stubbs (Lib Dem)

indicates seat up for re-election.

== Economy ==
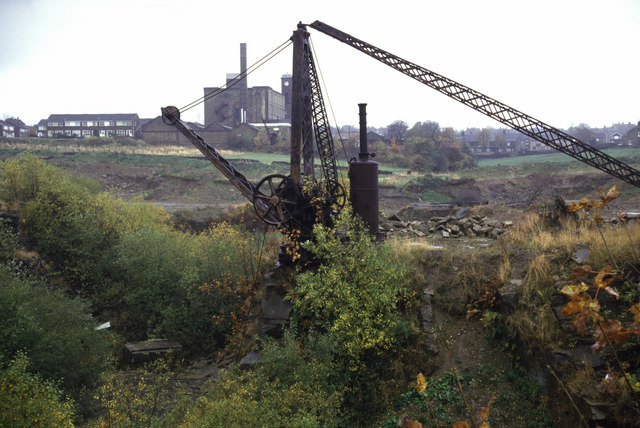
Hard York Quarries near Fagley

Along the south-western end of Victoria Road is the Victoria Industrial Estate including The Old Mill and a variety of commercial and light industrial units. Work has begun on the creation of 589 homes on the former sandstone quarry near Fagley.

A Lidl supermarket and Starbucks have been built on an as yet unfinished retail park on the now demolished Union Mills/Pilleys Mill site.

== Education ==
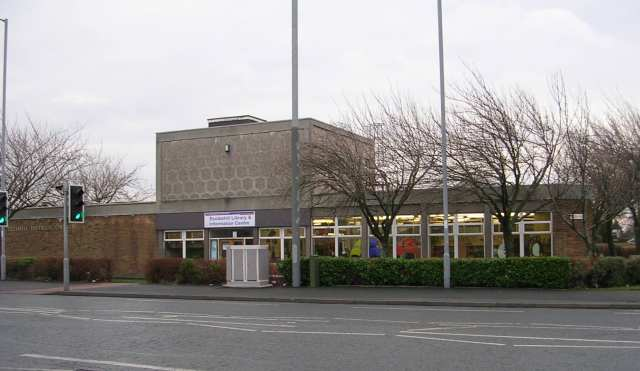
Eccleshill Library on Bolton Road

Cavendish Primary school, Saint Brendan's primary school, to the west near Five Lane Ends is the Hanson Academy. Hutton Middle school was demolished to make way of housing, although the caretakers house still remains. Also demolished was Eccleshill Upper school and a replacement school was built in Thackley called Immanuel College.

Ashcroft Doctor's surgery, Eccleshill Hospital (not A&E) and Inspire business park was built in place on the old Eccleshill Upper school grounds. Eccleshill Public Library is on Bolton Road. In Fagley on Falsgrave Road is Fagley primary school.

Eccleshill was the first township to elect a School Board in the land, following Edward Forsters Education Act of 1871. The School Board built three schools; Greengates, Wellington and the Central Board School; later named Hutton School after John Hutton who was Chair of the School Board for over 25 years and who bought and donated the land for and contributed to the building of the Central Board School. Both Hutton School and Wellington Schools were demolished to make way for new housing developments. The Greengates school building only remains - as of 2022 it remained unlisted.

== Transport ==
The area is served by the First Bradford 640, 641 and 645 Green Line and A2 airport bus services. The main roads through the area are the north–south A658 Harrogate Road, and the A6176 Bolton Road—Pullan Avenue. Apperly Bridge railway is approximately 1.5 miles away.

== Sport ==
Eccleshill United Football Club are currently members of the Northern Counties East Football League Premier Division, but have been renamed as Keighley Town and now play at Cougar Park, in Keighley. Other local sports teams include Eccleshill Badminton Club who use the facilities of Hanson School. Rugby team Victoria Rangers A.R.L.F.C. and Victoria Rangers A.F.C. who once used the facilities of Eccleshill Sports and Social Club. until they folded.

== Culture and events ==
The Eccleshill Village Fair is held annually in The Delph, a grassed over former Stoney Lane Quarry north of Stony Lane. The spelling of Stoney/Stony Lane is contentious even today although older maps favour the Stoney spelling.

== Notable people ==
See the category People from Eccleshill.

Artist David Hockney (b. 1937) grew up in Eccleshill. TV presenter, journalist, and game show host Richard Whiteley (1943–2005) was born in Eccleshill into a family of mill owners, and lived there in his youth. The company was Thomas Whiteley & Co. (1889–1963) worsted manufacturers based in mill premises off Stone Hall Road. TV presenter and journalist Christa Ackroyd (b. 1957) and actor Duncan Preston (b. 1946) were born in Eccleshill.

Popular Victorian actress and 'postcard beauty' Marie Studholme (1872–1930) was born at Stone Hall, Eccleshill. Inventor Edward Spurr (1907–1998) was brought up in Eccleshill and Yorkshire and England cricketer Don Brennan (1920–1985) was born in Eccleshill.

Arthur Wood (1898–1973), a Yorkshire and England cricketer was born in Fagley and Eric Anderson (1915–1943), a posthumous recipient of the Victoria Cross lived in Ashfield Place, Fagley.
