= Thackley =

Village in West Yorkshire, England

Coordinates: 53.844°N 1.734°W

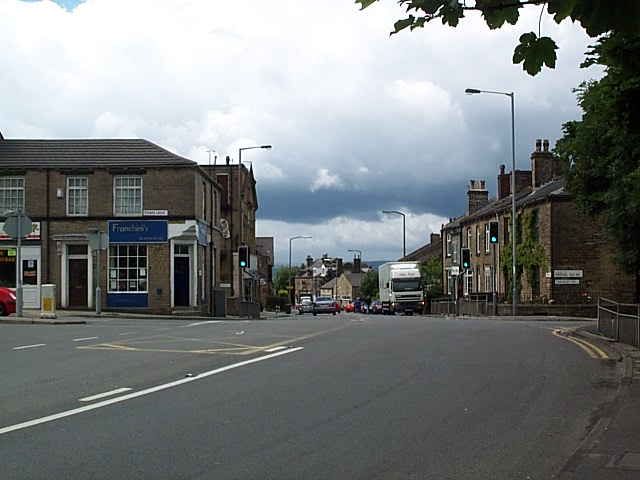
- Thackley Corner, Thackley

- Location within West Yorkshire
- OS grid reference: SE17503870
- Metropolitan borough: City of Bradford
- Metropolitan county: West Yorkshire
- Region: Yorkshire and the Humber
- Country: England
- Sovereign state: United Kingdom
- Post town: BRADFORD
- Postcode district: BD10
- Dialling code: 01274
- Police: West Yorkshire
- Fire: West Yorkshire
- Ambulance: Yorkshire

Thackley is a small suburb near Bradford, West Yorkshire in England. The village is loosely bordered by the village of Idle to the south, to the west by the West Royd area of Shipley and elsewhere by the Leeds and Liverpool Canal. Thackley is the northernmost part of Bradford, south of the River Aire.

== History ==
=== Prehistory ===
An archaeological project in 2009, funded by the Heritage Lottery Fund, revealed the site in Buck Wood of an enclosure that was in use as a settlement from Neolithic to post-Roman times. The work, undertaken by the Friends of Buck Wood and led by a professional archaeologist, showed that in the past a substantial boundary wall had been built of local unworked stone, enclosing a natural terrace of level ground now surrounded by woods. This formed an oval enclosure, roughly 82 metres (269 ft) by 78 metres (256 ft) in size.

The remains of a quern stone for grinding grain were found within this central area, as was a single cup marked carved rock. Leading away from the enclosure is an orthostat wall of large stones, part of a network of such walls in the wood.

=== Industrial development ===
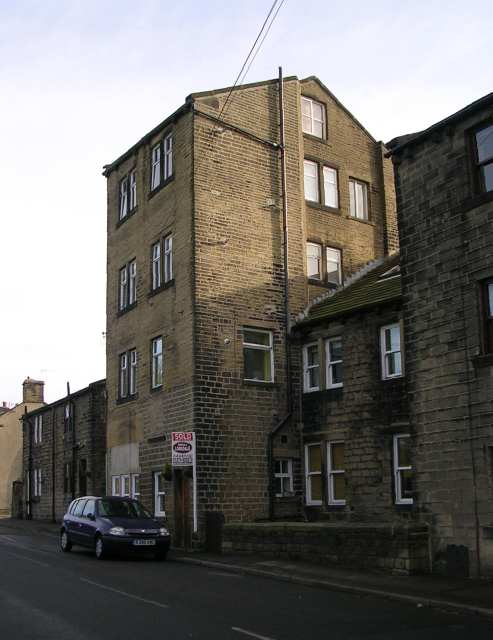
Former works premises^{*} on Thackley Road

Historically, the area formed part of the Lordship of Idle. In the 17th century a tanning industry developed, and in the 19th century sandstone was quarried, and mills were built for the local cotton industry.

Brackendale Mill was a woollen mill established circa 1800 in the north of Thackley. The mill was extended in 1829 with an engine house and water wheel and in the 1870s a steam powered weaving shed was added to the site. Today, the mill building is a living accommodation.

Recent dwelling development on Weavers Croft off Crag Hill Road occupies part of the site of the former Bowling Green Mills.

=== Transport history ===
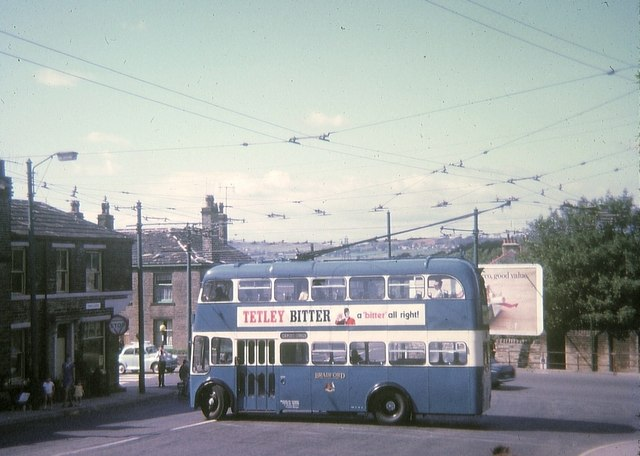
Trolley Bus turning at Thackley Corner terminus

The Leeds and Liverpool Canal was built through the far north of Thackley in the 1770s.

In 1845 railway construction began with the building of a two-track Thackley Railway Tunnel under Thackley Hill—in use up until 1968. In 1900 a second adjacent and parallel tunnel was added on the northern side of the original to create a fast passenger line and a slow goods line on the Airedale Line.

In 1875, the Great Northern Railway opened its Shipley and Windhill Line, a 6.5 miles (10.5 km) double-track branch line from Quarry Gap junction near Laisterdyke to Shipley and Windhill railway station, passing Eccleshill and Idle railway stations and Thackley railway station. Thackley railway station, rebuilt in 1894, is in the middle of Thackley. The line wasn't competitive and after 1931 it was made single-line freight only, and progressively closed from 1966 to 1968. The route through Thackley can be easily identified today—the rails have been removed and the route is overgrown by trees but the original railway bridges and cuttings in Thackley still remain.

A trolleybus service ran from Shipley, West Yorkshire up to its terminus at Thackley Corner in the centre of Thackley.

=== The Open Air School ===
Between 1908 and 1939 sickly children from Bradford were bused in to attend the Open Air School in Buck Wood. Near the main entrance to Buck Wood on Ainsbury Avenue (private road) is a plateau originally formed from waste material created when the first railway tunnel was built under Buck Wood. This flat raised area was used as a playground by children at the school and traces of the foundations of the school buildings can still be seen beyond the steps leading down from the north-east edge of the plateau.

== Geography ==
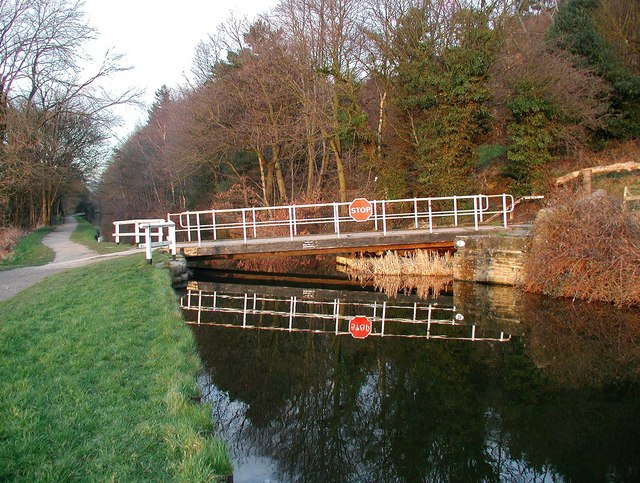
Buck Mill Lane bridge and the Leeds and Liverpool Canal

The village has no obvious focal centre such as a village green however the road system is centred on a crossroads in the south of the village known as Thackley Corner. From Thackley Corner Town Lane heads south toward Idle and Bradford while Thackley Road runs north into a largely residential area. To the north of the village is the Airedale Railway Line linking Shipley and Leeds. North of the rail line is the Leeds and Liverpool Canal separating Thackley from Baildon and Esholt further north and then the River Aire. To the northwest at the end of Thackley Road is Buck Mill Lane leading down Buck Hill across the canal at Buck Mill Lane Bridge and then across the River Aire at Buck Mill Bridge, a foot and bridle bridge leading to the Charlestown area of Baildon.

To the west of the village is the Burnwells and Thackley End areas of Thackley and to the east Simpson Green.

=== Buck Wood ===
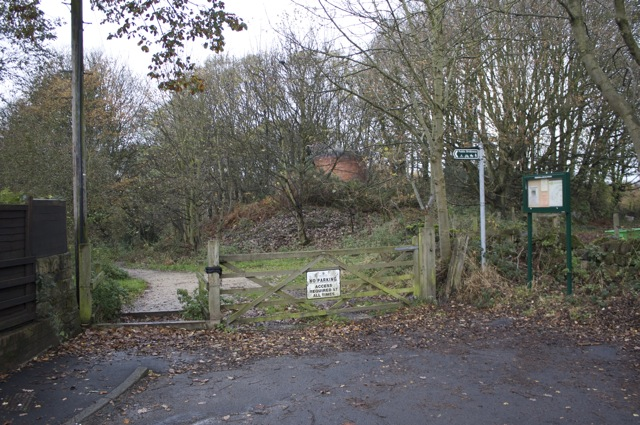
The entrance to Buck Wood on Thackley Road

Buck Wood lies to the north of Thackley. The wood covers an area of fairly level high ground, as well as the steep north-facing slope down to the Leeds and Liverpool canal. Above this valley Buck Wood forms a broad semi-circular zone of woodland, adjoining other similar woods that are part of a woodland corridor stretching along the Aire Valley. Covering 42 hectares, Buck Wood is bordered by the curving route of the canal at its lower perimeter around 60 m above sea-level. Its highest boundary 135 m above sea level, is shaped by the tree-lined sweep of Ainsbury Avenue leading from Thackley through to Esholt. Thackley itself forms the southern boundary of the Wood, and at the northern edge near Dawson Wood is where part of the land is taken up by Yorkshire Water's waste water primary settling tanks.

Buck Wood lies above a layer of millstone grit rock with numerous rocky outcrops, especially on the steeper slopes, where quarrying has taken place. The wood contains a mixture of habitats, with areas of both broad-leaved woodland and mixed deciduous/coniferous plantations. It has patches of marshland created by the many springs occurring throughout the Wood. There are fields scattered within the woodland, some used as pasture for grazing. Buck Wood has a variety of habitats and is an important reservoir for wildlife in Thackley and the surrounding area, and an area for walking and other leisure activities.

== Landmarks ==
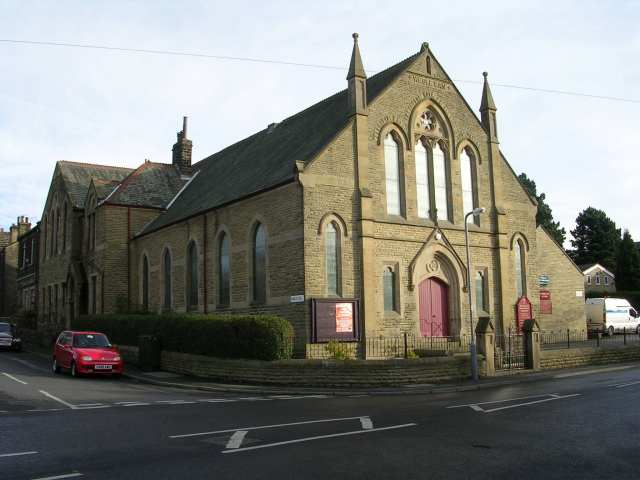
Thackley Methodist Church (1889) on Thackley Road

Notable buildings include the large Methodist church on Thackley Road and the Methodist Community Hall that serves as a village hall for various groups and societies.

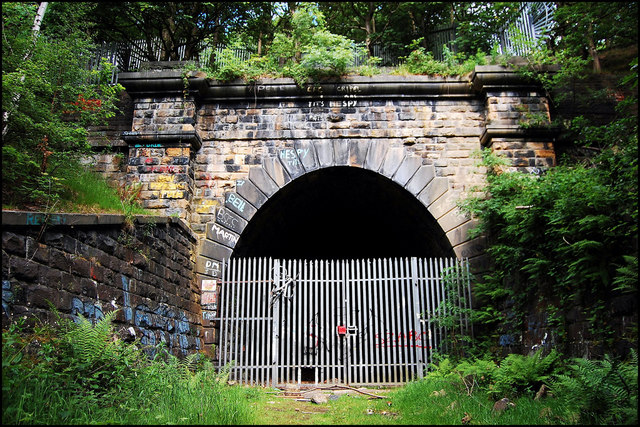
Thackley Tunnel west portal

The village is the site of Thackley Tunnel, one of a pair of long railway tunnels running underneath Thackley Hill and around the north of the village. Idle (L&BR) railway station was a short lived railway station located just to the west of the western entrance to Thackley Tunnel some distance from Idle itself. There are a series of pairs of tunnel ventilation shafts across the landscape between the tunnel portals through the farms in the north of Thackley. No longer used, the (older) southerly tunnel is blocked off midway down its length and the entrance portals gated.

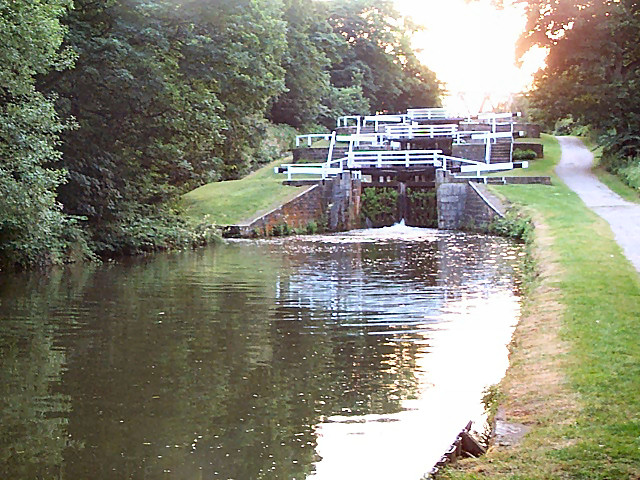
Field Locks^{*} on the Leeds and Liverpool Canal near Thackley

The Leeds and Liverpool Canal runs parallel with the course of the River Aire in a distinctive bend around Thackley Hill. A tow path runs along the north side of the canal where the Idle and Thackley Angling Association have fishing rights.

North of Thackley adjacent to Field Wood on the canal is the listed Field Locks (1774–77) a three-rise set of locks. Just west of these locks is a long disused rail bridge part of the Esholt Sewage Works Railway belonging to Yorkshire Water. Further east is a swing bridge and Yorkshire Water's Esholt Waste Water treatment works. On the Thackley side of the canal at this point is Yorkshire Water's storm water tanks and waste water screening plant. Further east and south along the canal is Idle Swing Bridge and Thackley Canal Bridges carrying the Airedale rail line over the canal a short distance east of the eastern portals of Thackley rail tunnels.

In 2006 the area around Thackley Road, Crag Hill Road, and Park Road was surveyed as the area was under consideration for conservation area status - but this was turned down due to the area's mixture of listed buildings with some modern features adjacent to modern buildings.

Listed buildings in Thackley are to be found on Burnwells, Crag Hill Road, Ellar Carr Road, Mitchell Lane, North Street, Park Place, Park Road, Thackley Road, Windhill Old Road, the Leeds and Liverpool Canal and farmhouses in an arc around the north of the village. and as part of the Thackley Urban Village Project a sculpture trail has been created in Buck Wood.

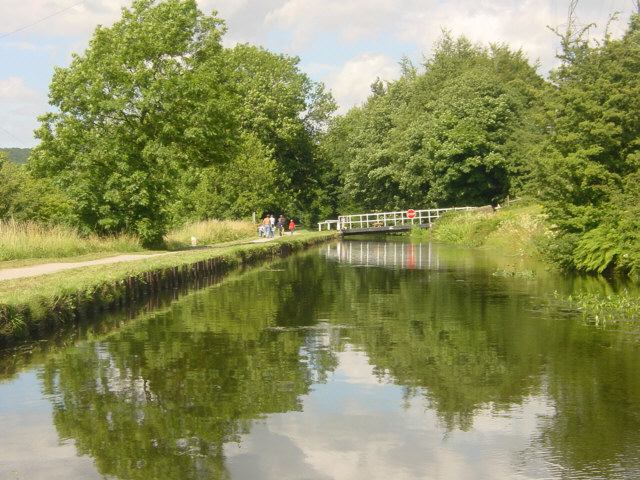
The Leeds and Liverpool Canal near Thackley

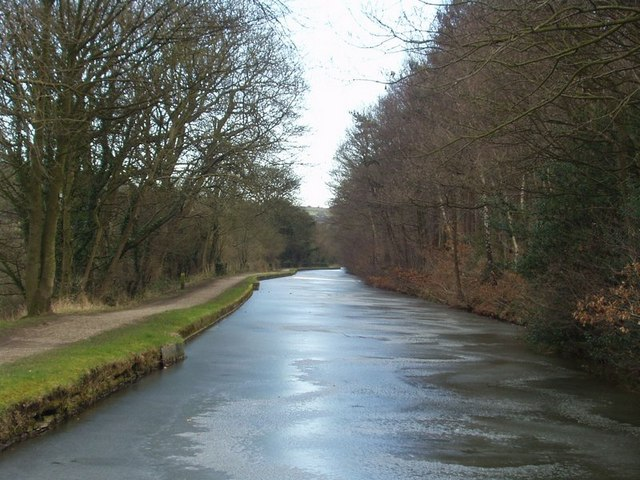
Leeds and Liverpool Canal and Buck Wood

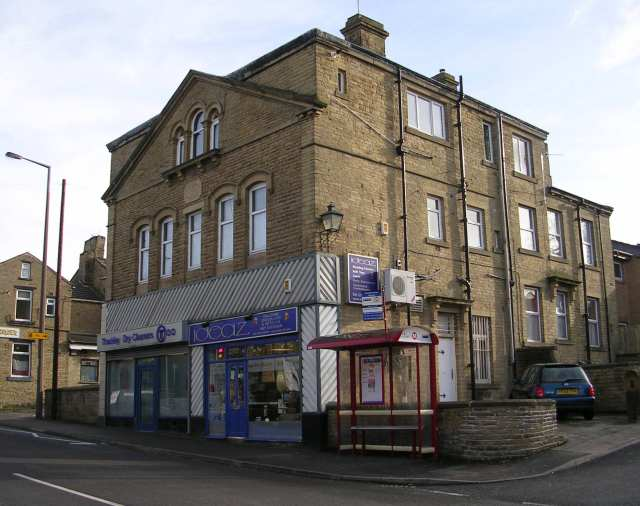
Windhill Co-operative Society on Leeds Road

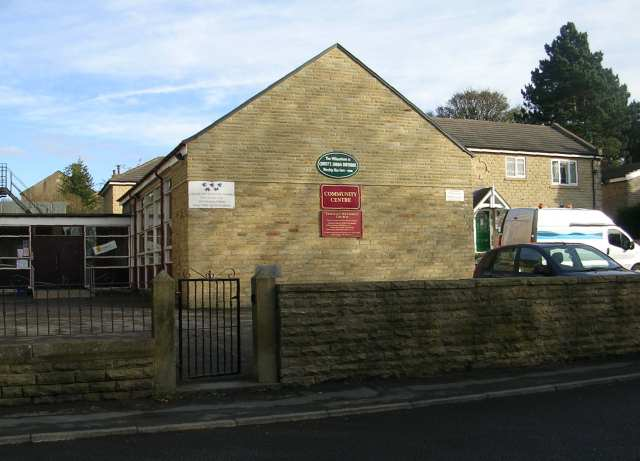
Methodist Church community centre

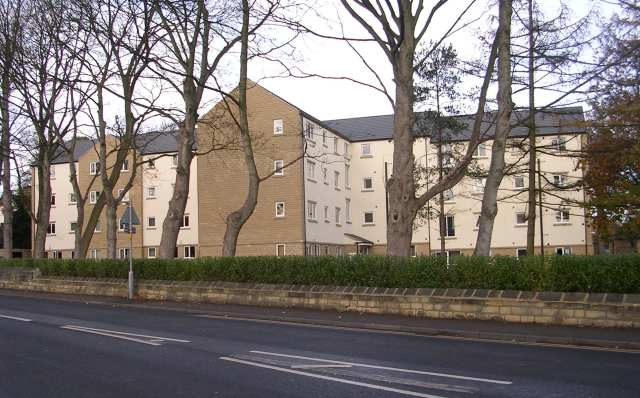
New apartments off Park Road.

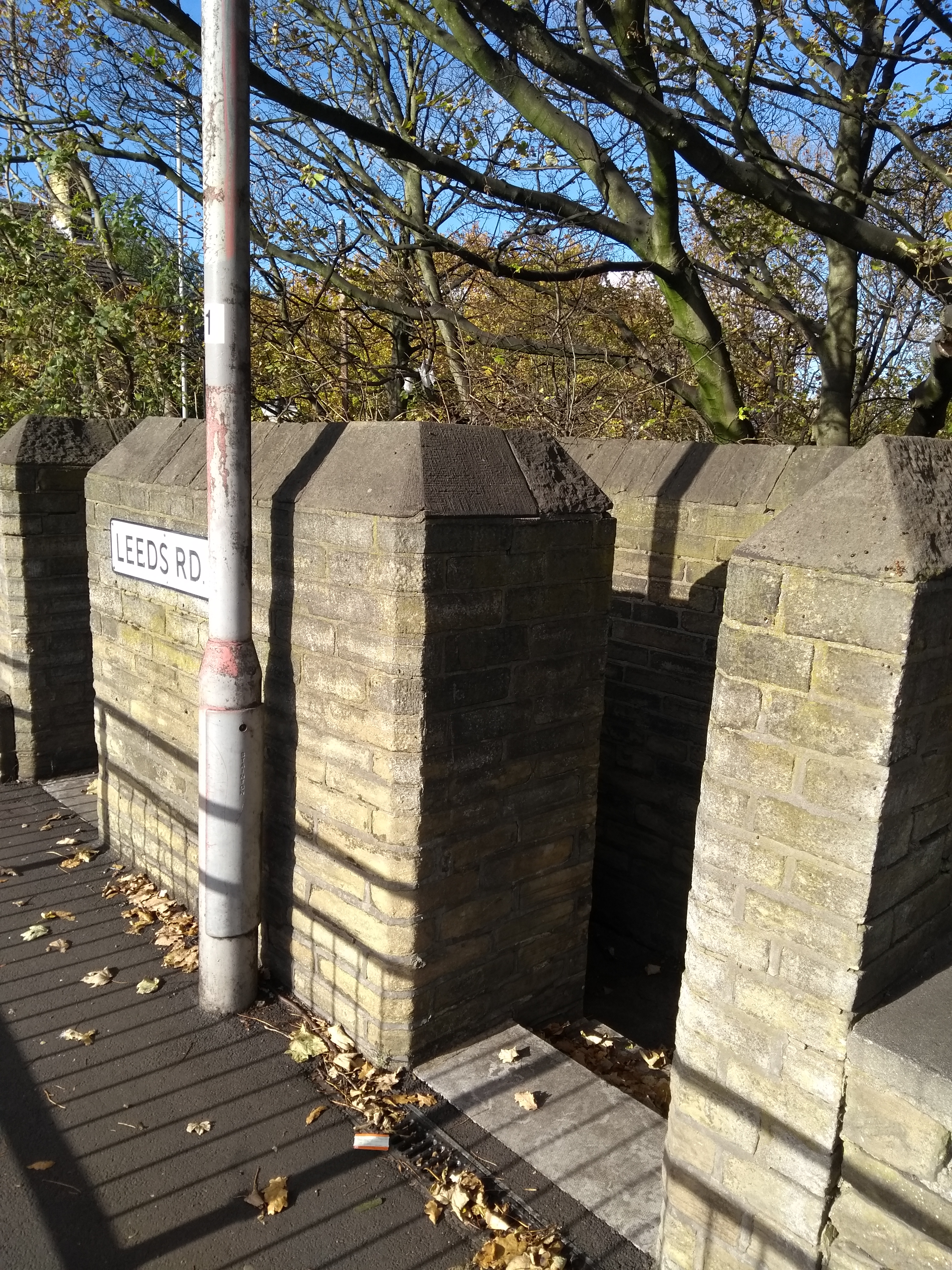
Stone-built urinal on Leeds Road.
^{*} listed building

== Governance ==
The village is located in the Idle and Thackley ward, and in the newly revived parliamentary constituency of Bradford East—formerly Bradford North.

== Economy ==
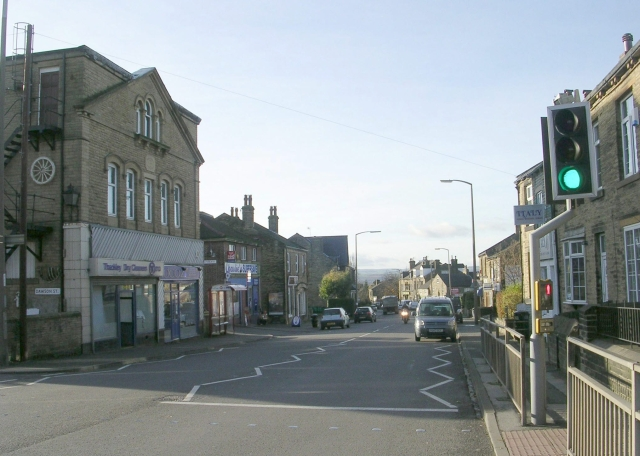
Leeds Road near Thackley Corner

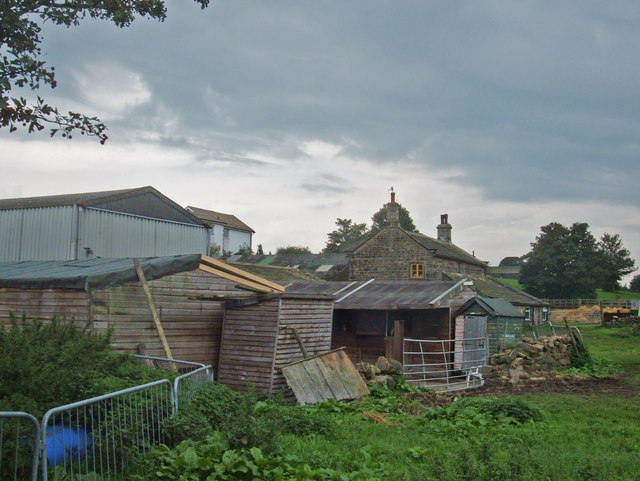
Low Ash Farm^{*} in the north of Thackley village

Thackley Corner and a section of Leeds Road to the west are home to most of the village's shops, pubs and eateries. Amenities include a dry cleaners, butcher, long standing established Estate Agents Martin Lonsdale, newsagent and multiple hair salons.

There are three public houses in Thackley, The Great Northern, The Commercial Inn, and a micropub The Black Rat. Another micropub - The Ainsbury - can be found on the corner of Thackley Road and Crag Hill Road, opposite Thackley Methodist Church.

Many of the properties in the north of the village are historic farm buildings, and some have been specialised in horse riding, such as Birkhill Farm.

== Education ==
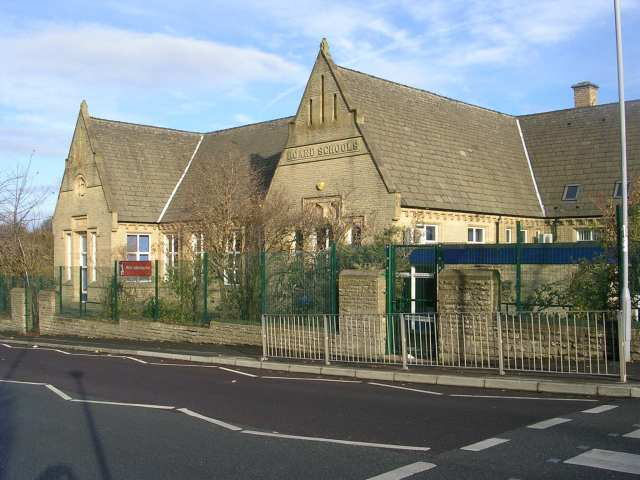
Thackley Primary School on Thackley Corner

Thackley Primary School is situated on the south east of Thackley Corner, and Immanuel College is located on Leeds Road in the east of the village.

== Transport ==
The nearest railway station is Shipley, with connections to Bradford, Leeds and Keighley. The main 'A' Road through the village is the A657 Leeds Road running from Shipley in the west to Greengates in the east and onto Leeds. FirstGroup's bus services operate from Shipley through Thackley to Buttershaw (612, 613 & 614) providing a 15-minute frequency into Bradford and Shipley Monday to Saturday daytime.

Keighley Bus Company also provides a half-hourly daytime service to Bingley, Keighley, Leeds and Shipley; this is operated as the Aireline 60, taking its name from the local River Aire. TLC Travel 660 service between Bradford and Shipley also runs on an hourly basis Monday to Saturday daytime. Leeds and Liverpool Canal is used almost entirely by barge pleasure craft.

== Sport ==
The village has had a football team, Thackley A.F.C., since 1930 who currently play in the Northern Counties East League Premier Division and have their home ground of Dennyfield in Buck Wood to the north-west of the village. The village cricket club, Thackley C.C., play nearby in their ground off Thackley Road.

== Culture and events ==
The Friends of Buck Wood group was established in March 2004; membership consists of local residents and users of the wood. Working in partnership with Bradford Council, the owners of the wood, the group aims to protect and improve Buck Wood for the benefit of the wildlife, environment and the people of the surrounding area.

The 'Friends' organise a variety of events throughout the year aimed at adding to people's enjoyment and understanding of the woodland environment. Members meet regularly for activities such as clearing the Open Air School site, cutting back overgrown bushes, planting native wildflowers and bulbs, and installing bat and bird boxes. Oliver Rhodes, patron of Bradford Grammar School, resides in the Thackley area. His life is celebrated each year at the Thackley Methodist church.

== Notable people ==
Joseph Wright, a distinguished 19th/20th Century professor of linguistics at Oxford University was born in Thackley and grew up in nearby Windhill. He published in 1892 the book A grammar of the dialect of Windhill, which was one of the first attempts to apply phonetics to an English dialect. He later published the English Dialect Dictionary in six volumes.

== See also ==
- Listed buildings in Idle and Thackley
