= Hanson Academy =

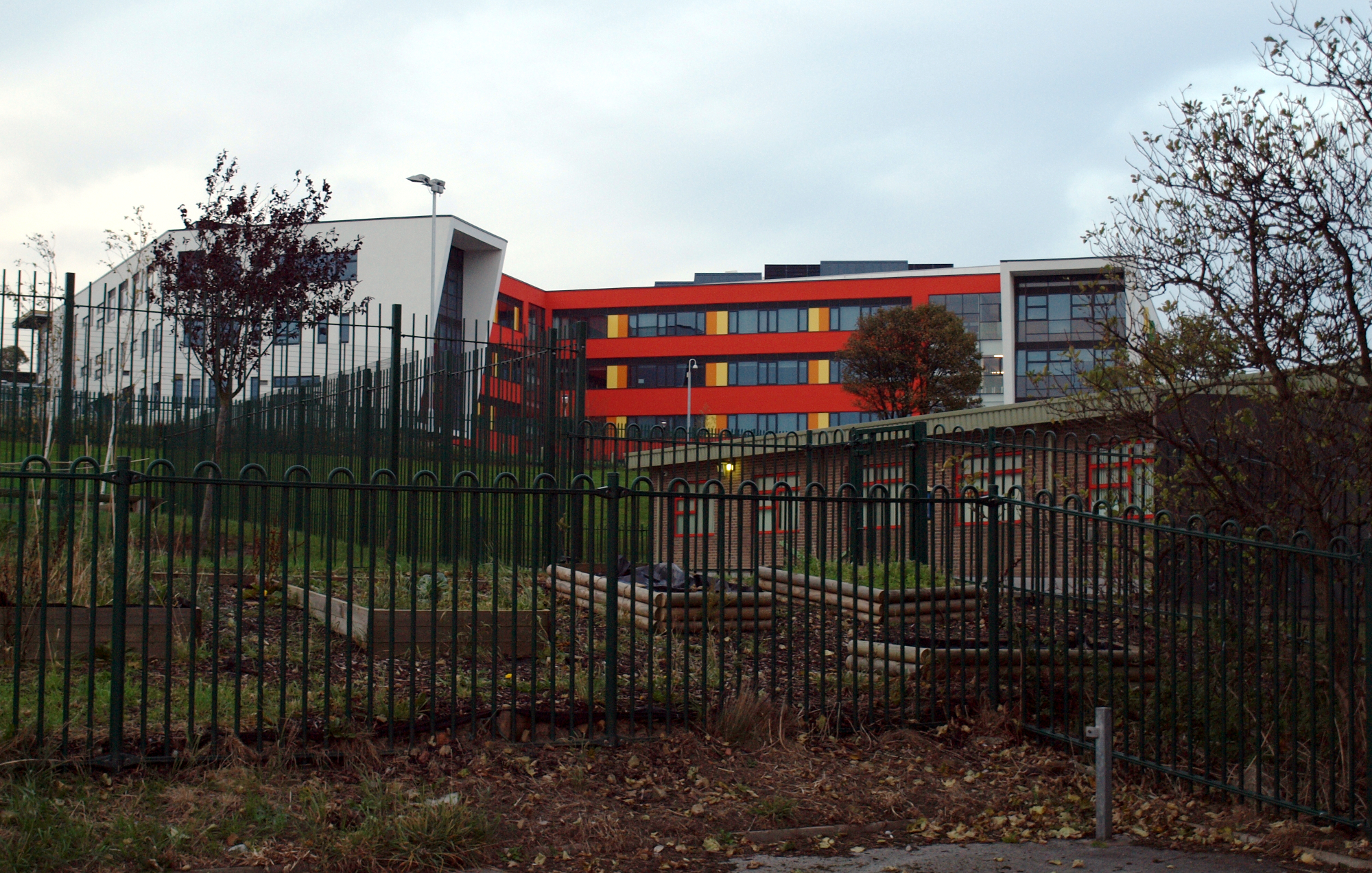
- View from Myers Lane-(2011)

Location
- Sutton Avenue; Bradford, West Yorkshire, BD2 1JP; England; 53.8181°N 1.7428°W

Information
- Type: Academy
- Established: 1897
- Local authority: City of Bradford
- Trust: Delta Academies Trust
- Department for Education URN: 149011 Tables
- Ofsted: Reports
- Principal: Sam Sheedy
- Gender: Coeducational
- Age: 11 to 18
- Enrolment: 1547 (in 2025)
- Website: www.hanson.org.uk

Hanson Academy, formerly Hanson Grammar School and then Hanson School, is a co-educational secondary school and sixth-form in Bradford, West Yorkshire, England.

== Admissions ==
Hanson Academy is situated between Bolton and Five Lane Ends.

== History ==
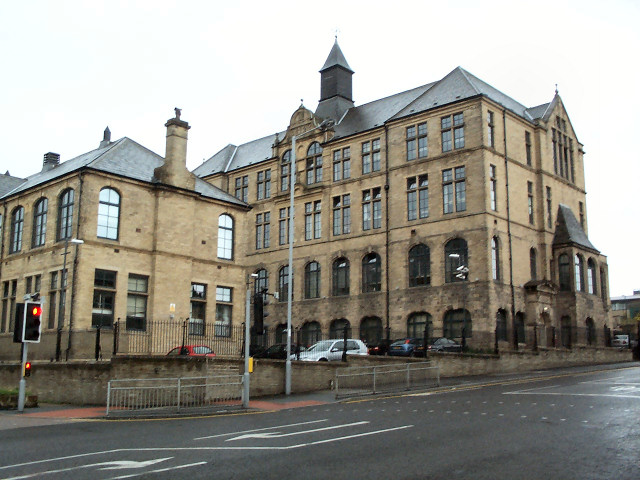
Former Hanson School on Barkerend Road

=== Grammar school ===
The Hanson Grammar School was designed by Charles Henry Hargreaves and opened on Byron Street, near Barkerend Road, in 1897. The boys' and girls' schools were next door to each other.

In 1967 the girls' school had moved to a new building on Sutton Avenue. In the early 1970s, although retaining the name of a grammar school, the intake was comprehensive. The girls' school had around 500 girls, with 80 in the sixth-form. The boys' school had around 550 boys with 120 in the sixth-form.

=== Comprehensive ===
It became the co-educational Hanson School in 1972, situated at the Sutton Avenue site. In the 1980s, the Sutton Avenue site was known as Hanson Upper School. In July 2011, the school moved to a different building within the same Sutton Avenue grounds.

Following an Ofsted inspection in 2010, the secondary school was placed in special measures.

In 2014 Hanson School was in the media because of the high number of students, more than 200, sent home for not adhering to the uniform policy.

During this time, the school was struggling to find a trust until 2022, when Delta Academy Trust took over.

In January 2018 the school came out of special measures, and is currently graded by Ofsted as "requires improvement".

=== Academy ===
Previously a foundation school administered by Bradford City Council, Hanson School converted to academy status in July 2022 and was renamed Hanson Academy. The school is now sponsored by the Delta Academies Trust.

=== Head teachers ===
- Sam Sheedy (Principal) (2023–Present)
- David Hewitt (Associate Executive Principal) (2022–Present)
- Richard Woods (2016–2022)
- Elizabeth Churton (2012–2015)
- Tim Brookes (2008–2010)
- Susan Horsley (2003–2008)
- Maureen Jones
- Lily Peters

== Campus ==
Hanson has four floors. There is a Sixth Form centre. There is a footballing centre, home to "Goals", which has 15+ five aside pitches and 1 full-size football pitch.

A new school building was completed in 2011. The building of Pulse Gym was also completed in 2010; it has a 65-station gym, interactive centre, sports hall and two dance studios. The gym is for pupil use as well as for members of the public.

== Notable former pupils ==
- Bad Boy Chiller Crew, bassline group
- Tom Cleverley, footballer
- Lewis Emanuel, footballer
- Steven Wells, journalist and former writer for Radio 4's 1990s On the Hour and BBC's The Day Today

=== Hanson Boys' Grammar School ===
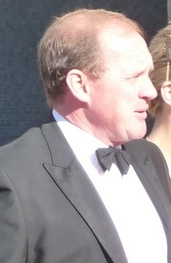
Actor Peter Firth at the 2009 BAFTA Awards

- Sir Edward Victor Appleton FRS, Vice-Chancellor from 1949 to 1965 of the University of Edinburgh, received the 1947 Nobel Prize for Physics for investigations into the ionosphere, the Kennelly–Heaviside layer and the F region (Appleton layer) that reflect lower frequency radio waves, and became Jacksonian Professor of Natural Philosophy from 1936 to 1939 at the University of Cambridge
- David Bairstow, Yorkshire cricketer (wicket-keeper), father of England batsman (also a wicket-keeper) Jonny Bairstow
- Clarence Barton, Labour MP from 1945 to 1950 for Wembley South
- Vic Feather, Baron Feather, General Secretary of the Trades Union Congress (TUC) from 1969 to 1973, and President from 1973 to 1974 of the European Trade Union Confederation
- Peter Firth, film and TV actor, nominated for Best Supporting Actor in the 1978 50th Academy Awards, and known for the 1985 Letter to Brezhnev
- Sir Trevor Holdsworth CVO, chairman from 1980 to 1988 of GKN, Chancellor from 1992 to 1997 of the University of Bradford
- Wilfrid Lawson, actor
- Tony McHale, co-created (with Mal Young) Holby City
- Andrew Mawson, Baron Mawson OBE, known for the Bromley by Bow Centre
- Leslie Sands, actor of the 1960s often playing dour policemen, who would consequently later appear in Juliet Bravo
- John Sewel, Baron Sewel CBE, leader of Aberdeen Council from 1977 to 1980, and President from 1982 to 1984 of the Convention of Scottish Local Authorities
- Edward Spurr, described as Bradford's Forgotten Inventor

=== Hanson Girls' Grammar School ===
- Margaret Eaton, Baroness Eaton OBE, politician
- Stephanie Turner, actress, notably for Insp Jean Darblay from 1980 to 1982 in Juliet Bravo
