= Edward Spurr =

Edward Spurr (1907–1998) was an English engineer. He was born in Eccleshill, Bradford, England. He was a pupil of Hanson Boys High School.

Often described as "Bradford's Forgotten Inventor", he worked on an impressive range of projects. Not only did he design a powerboat engine with T. E. Lawrence (Lawrence of Arabia), but also worked on the Dambusters' bouncing bomb and Frank Whittle's jet engine. Spurr also designed various parts and other engines, for boats and planes, cars, motorcycles, and washing machines, his other inventions include pick-ups for record players and an automatic toaster.
