= Eccleshill railway station =

Disused railway station in West Yorkshire, England

Eccleshill
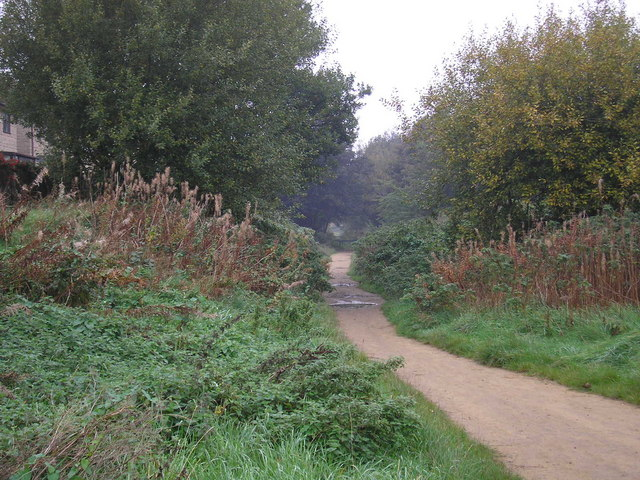
- The site of the station in 2006

General information
- Location: Eccleshill, West Yorkshire, City of Bradford; England
- Coordinates: 53.8211°N 1.7162°W
- Grid reference: SE186361
- Platforms: 2

Other information
- Status: Disused

History
- Original company: GNR
- Pre-grouping: GNR
- Post-grouping: L&NER

Key dates
- 15 April 1875: Opened
- 2 February 1931: Closed (passenger)
- 31 October 1964: Closed (line)
Location

Eccleshill railway station was a railway station in Eccleshill, West Yorkshire, England.

== History ==
During the 1860s, two small railway companies were formed to promote suburban railways in Bradford, the Bradford, Eccleshill and Idle Railway and the Idle and Shipley Railway. Their schemes - and the companies themselves - were taken up by the Great Northern Railway, which built a line looping through the villages to the north-east of Bradford: from Laisterdyke, through Eccleshill, Idle and Thackley to Shipley.

The line was open to goods traffic on 4 May 1874, and to passengers on 18 January 1875. Eccleshill railway station opened on 15 April 1875.

Passenger service on the line ceased on 2 February 1931 and the passenger station closed, though goods traffic and excursions continued on the whole line until October 1964 and between Shipley and Idle until 1968.

== Route ==
Preceding station	Disused railways	Following station
Idle	GNR; Shipley Great Northern Railway branch line	Laisterdyke
