= A657 road =

Road in West Yorkshire, England

A657

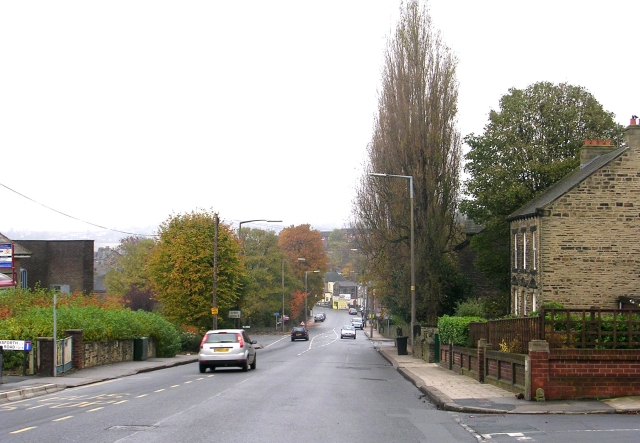
- Between Bramley and Rodley as Rodley Lane

Route information
- Length: 8 mi (13 km)

Major junctions
- East end: Bramley; 53.8042°N 1.6209°W
- West end: Saltaire; 53.8354°N 1.7941°W

Location
- Country: United Kingdom
- Constituent country: England

Road network
- Roads in the United Kingdom; Motorways; A and B road zones

The A657 is an A road in West Yorkshire, England that begins in Bramley and ends in Saltaire near Shipley. The road is approximately 8 miles (13 km) long.

The road starts from the Bramley Town End (Stanningley By-Pass junction) and ends at the junction with the A650 at Saltaire.

== History ==
Much of the A657 was originally the Shipley and Bramley Turnpike, with toll gates at Windhill Bar, Greengates Bar and Rodley Lane Bar.

In 2010, funding was secured to replace the roundabout at Saltaire (where the A657 ends) with a new traffic light system. The development was completed at the end of 2013, but opinion was divided on whether the change was an improvement.

== Places along road ==
- Bramley
- Rodley
- Calverley
- Greengates
- Thackley
- Shipley
- Saltaire
