= Immanuel College, Bradford =

Immanuel College
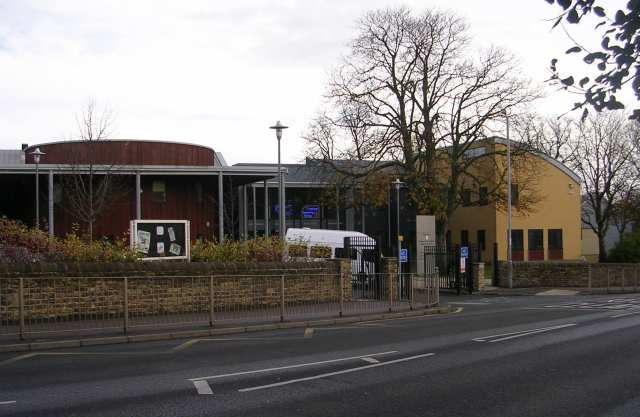
- The school seen from Leeds Road

Location
- Leeds Road; Idle; Bradford, West Yorkshire, BD10 9AQ; England; 53.84054°N 1.72676°W

Information
- Type: Academy
- Motto: "All God's Children"
- Religious affiliation: Christian
- Established: October 2001
- Local authority: City of Bradford
- Department for Education URN: 142590 Tables
- Ofsted: Reports
- Chair of Governors: Denise Sterling
- Head Teacher: Stephen Mulligan
- Gender: Mixed
- Age: 11 to 18
- Enrolment: 1,400
- Website: http://www.immanuelcollege.net/

Immanuel College is a mixed Church of England secondary school and sixth form located in Idle, City of Bradford, West Yorkshire, England. It was officially opened in October 2001.

== History ==
The school replaced the now demolished Eccleshill upper school on Harrogate Road, Eccleshill. Construction began in 2000 and was finally opened in 2001 by the Bishop of Bradford, David Smithmany parts of the school were still unfinished and it wasn't until 2003 that the school could be considered fully built. The school now has modern facilities such as modern computer suites in most departments, dining facilities and a large sports hall.

Previously a voluntary aided school administered by Bradford City Council, in February 2016 Immanuel College was converted to academy status. However, the school continues to be under the guidance of the Diocese of Leeds, and coordinates with Bradford City Council for admissions.

== Layout ==
| Number | Area | Uses |
|---|---|---|
| 1. | Sports Hall | PE, Assemblies |
| 2. | F Block | Maths |
| 3. | The Quad | Breaktime |
| 4. | Assembly Halls | Assemblies, exams |
| 5. | C Block | English, MFL |
| 6. | B Block | Science |
| 7. | A Block | Technology, Art |
| 8. | J Block | Reprographics, Admin |
| 9. | 6th Form Common Room | Research, Rest, Revision |
| 10. | Library | Research |
| 11. | I Block | ICT, Child Development |
| 12. | Dining Hall | Dinner, Rest |
| 13. | D Block | Dramatic Arts, Music |
| 14. | H Block | Geography, History |

== School Data ==
Background Information

- Total number of pupils (all ages) 1133
- Number of day pupils of compulsory school age 1090
- % of half days missed due to authorised absence 3.8%
- % of half days missed due to unauthorised absence 37.2%

School Data from (Data from 2005)

== Notable alumni ==
Jake Passmore - Irish Olympic diver

Bobby Kristovic - 2x BIKC National Finalist & President of the University of Liverpool Racing Society
