= Thackley railway station =

Disused railway station in West Yorkshire, England

Thackley

General information
- Location: Thackley, City of Bradford; England
- Coordinates: 53.84324°N 1.73567°W
- Grid reference: SE174385
- Platforms: 2

Other information
- Status: Disused

History
- Original company: Great Northern Railway
- Pre-grouping: Great Northern Railway
- Post-grouping: London and North Eastern Railway

Key dates
- 1 March 1878: Opened
- 2 February 1931: Closed (passenger)
- 7 October 1968: Closed (line)
Location

Thackley railway station was a railway station in Thackley, West Yorkshire, England.

== History ==
During the 1860s, two small railway companies were formed to promote suburban railways in Bradford, the Bradford, Eccleshill and Idle Railway and the Idle and Shipley Railway. Their schemes - and the companies themselves - were taken up by the Great Northern Railway, which built a line looping through the villages to the north-east of Bradford: from Laisterdyke, through Eccleshill, Idle and Thackley to Shipley.

The line was open to goods traffic on 4 May 1874, and to passengers on 18 January 1875.

Thackley railway station was rebuilt in 1890–1894.

Passenger service on the line ceased on 2 February 1931 and the passenger station closed, though goods traffic continued on the whole line until October 1964 and between Shipley and Idle until 1968.

The line is now a public footpath, with only ruined buildings and partially demolished platforms at track level to show that this was a railway station. The 1894 building still exists and is now a private dwelling, situated next to the 1874 humped back Crag Hill Road bridge.

Preceding station	Disused railways	Following station
Shipley and Windhill	GNR; Shipley and Windhill Line	Idle
