= Shipley Great Northern Railway branch line =

Disused railway line in West Yorkshire, England

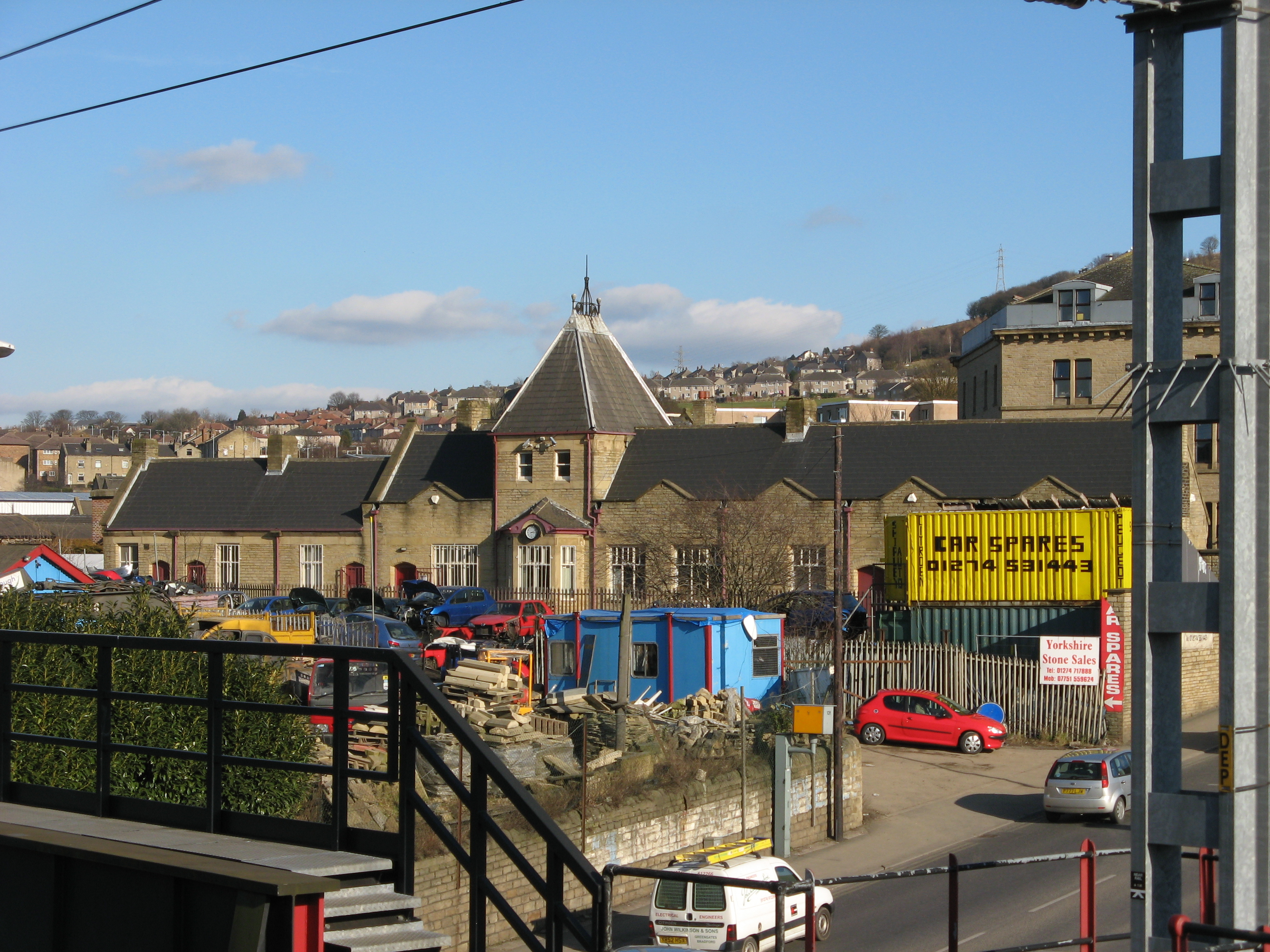
- The former GNR Shipley and Windhill Station viewed looking south east from the present Shipley railway station (former Midland railway owned)

Overview
- Status: Closed
- Owner: Great Northern Railway
- Locale: West Yorkshire
- Termini: Shipley and Windhill railway station; Laisterdyke railway station (Bradford Exchange railway station)
- Stations: 4

Service
- Type: Branch
- Operator: Great Northern Railway

History
- Opened: 1874/1875
- Closed: 1931/1964/1968

Technical
- Line length: 6.5 miles
- Number of tracks: 1
- Track gauge: 4 ft 8 1/2 in (1,435 mm)

The Shipley Great Northern Railway branch line was a railway line that ran east, south and then westwards from Shipley to Bradford in West Yorkshire, England. The route was opened in 1874 to goods traffic and then to passengers in 1875 by the Great Northern Railway (GNR) and looped around the eastern edge of Bradford. The GNR arrived after other railways had been established in the West Yorkshire area and many of their lines were heavily reliant on tunnels and grand viaducts, the Shipley and Windhill line being an exception to this, although it did have some steep gradients. The branch extended for 8.5 miles (13.7 km) between the two terminuses of Shipley Windhill and Bradford Exchange. The route as built from Laisterdyke to Shipley was actually only 6.5 miles (10.5 km) as the initial section from Bradford Exchange to Laisterdyke was already in existence as part of the Great Northern Railway's line to Leeds.

The Midland Railway Company offered a shorter route between Shipley and Bradford (Forster Square) due southwards via Bradford Dale on the valley floor at a distance of only 2.5 miles (4 km). (Note: The actual distances to both Bradford stations have been shortened since they were built. Forster Square has moved north and Exchange station has moved south (as detailed in Note 3)) The Shipley Great Northern Railway branch line was amalgamated into the London & North Eastern Railway in 1923 and became part of the North Eastern Region of British Rail in 1948.

== History ==
The line was promoted by two separate railway companies, the Bradford, Eccleshill & Idle Railway and the Idle & Shipley Railway. Whilst the necessary Acts of Parliament were granted for these railways in 1866 and 1867 respectively, with no progress on either four years later, the Great Northern Railway stepped in and built the railway in its entirety from its two parliamentary constituent parts. Complaints from the Idle Local Board noted that the combined population of the Idle, Eccleshill and Shipley conurbation had increased by nearly 9,000 people since the 1861 census and the Great Northern were losing traffic as a result. The Great Northern had an understanding that they would run the line(s) when opened anyway and with an act of parliament granted on 24 July 1871 they assumed control of the enterprise.

The branch left the Great Northern Bradford to Leeds line after Laisterdyke station with an eastwards facing connection. It first headed south and went through a triangular junction at Quarry Gap and Cutler North before heading north across the Bradford to Leeds line. This arrangement allowed through running onto other lines such as to Gildersome and through Pudsey to Leeds. Most passenger traffic would be between the stations on the line and Laisterdyke and/or Bradford.

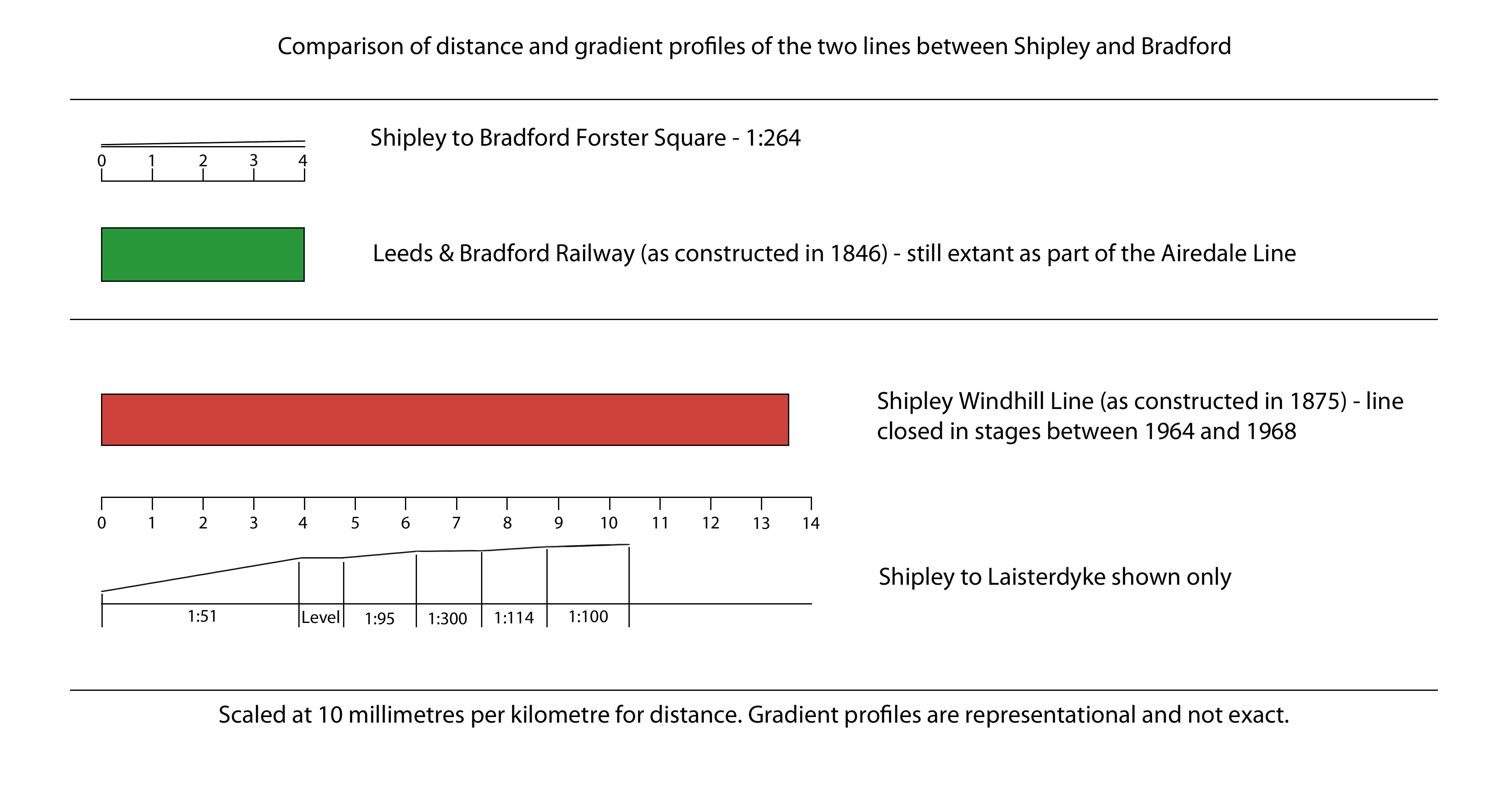
Comparison chart detailing distances and gradients on the two railways that ran from Shipley to Bradford. The Green line is the Midland built line and the red line is the Great Northern built line. The green line is still extant and running as part of the Airedale line through Bradford Dale.

Although the line had many over and underbridges and numerous cuttings, it was completely without any viaducts or tunnels. The trackbed had several gradients in comparison with existing railways that it was in competition with and one severe gradient on the climb out of Shipley to Thackley set at 1 in 50. (Note: The gradient is listed by some sources as 1 in 61, however 3 different reports from the time of opening all cite 1 in 50. This has been given as correct unless a definitive answer can be supplied (IE an actual gradient profile from the Great Northern/LNER/BR NE)) The gradients from Shipley to Laisterdyke were uphill all the way, being 1 in 50, 1 in 95, 1 in 300, 1 in 114 and 1 in 100 compared to the slight uphill gradient of the Midland line at 1 in 264 all the way from Shipley to Bradford Forster Square.

By 1874, the line was open to goods traffic with full opening to passengers in 1875. The line was engineered by Henry Nelson and John Fraser of Leeds with T.J. Walker being awarded £58,730 for construction of the line and T. Whiteley building the stone stations for £26,805.

The course of the line was built to accommodate double-track and this continued from opening until closure of the line to passengers in February 1931. The last passenger train actually ran on Saturday 31 January 1931, but official closure to passengers was on 2 February of the same year. The line was singled throughout after closure to passengers.

== Stations ==
The company built four stations on the line which all opened to passenger traffic in 1875, except Thackley which opened on 1 March 1878. All of the stations were closed together on 2 February 1931. The stations are listed from North to South.

Name	Coordinates	Notes
Shipley Windhill	53°50′04.2″N 1°46′11.2″W	Also known as Shipley Bridge Street
Thackley	53°50′35.7″N 1°44′08.3″W	
Idle	53°50′08.9″N 1°43′53.8″W	
Eccleshill	53°49′16.0″N 1°42′58.6″W	Now a housing development

The stations at Laisterdyke, St Dunstan's and Bradford Exchange were already open by the time this line was completed and they remained open for passengers beyond the lines passenger closure date of 1931 (to 1966 for Laisterdyke, 1952 for St Dunstan's, and 1973 for Bradford Exchange). (Note: Bradford Exchange station was replaced by a smaller station built on the former Bridge Street Goods depot in the same year. This new station became Bradford Interchange station in 1983 after the bus terminus opened adjacent to it in 1977.)

== Traffic ==
The line typically carried passengers and varied freight trains during its existence. The LNER closed the line because of dwindling passenger numbers. This closure was due to competition from trams going into Bradford along the direct routes westwards into the city. Whilst the trams offered a shorter route into Bradford from Thackley, Idle and Eccleshill, they too were supplanted on their routes in by ordinary road buses. Despite closure to passengers from the intermediate stations, the line still hosted passenger trains (especially diversions) as late as 1964. The Midland Railway company would not allow the passenger traffic on the line to interconnect with their station near to Shipley town centre, but a short spur with a length of 8 chains was built between the two railways which allowed trains to connect between the two companies. The spur was opened on 1 November 1875 for through running between the two companies.

In 1964 for instance, an express freight leaving Bradford Forster Square for Manchester was routed via the Windhill line and on through south Bradford without having to reverse at Exchange station. (By 1964 the former Midland and Great Northern lines were under the control of British Rail North Eastern Region so the previous problems of through passenger trains did not apply).

After the line was singled in 1931, it was worked by electric token from Laisterdyke East signal box. There were seven freights daily in 1957 (mostly carrying coal from the Wakefield collieries) which were limited to 28 wagons on the downgrade to Shipley. Trains were required to pin down brakes at Eccleshill, Idle and a final check was performed at Thackley before the train descended the 1 in 50 gradient. Workings up hill from Shipley were restricted to 20 wagons. (Note: Trains Illustrated became Modern Railways in 1962.)

It was suggested by the Leeds Times newspaper in 1870, that the line could be used to bring cattle in from the Craven district and cease the necessity of driving cattle through the streets of Bradford. At that time there was a slaughterhouse and cattle market adjacent to the Great Northern Terminus in south Bradford.

in 1887, Bradshaw's railway timetable lists the line as having 15 through passenger trains between Shipley and Bradford (Exchange) and one terminating at Idle from Bradford. In the 1910 timetable, the line lists 13 daily through trains and two that start from Laisterdyke to Shipley. By the 1922 timetable this had been reduced to nine services each way. In 1892, a little over seven years after opening to traffic, The Great Northern decided to start terminating some trains at Laisterdyke rather than running them the full length into Bradford.

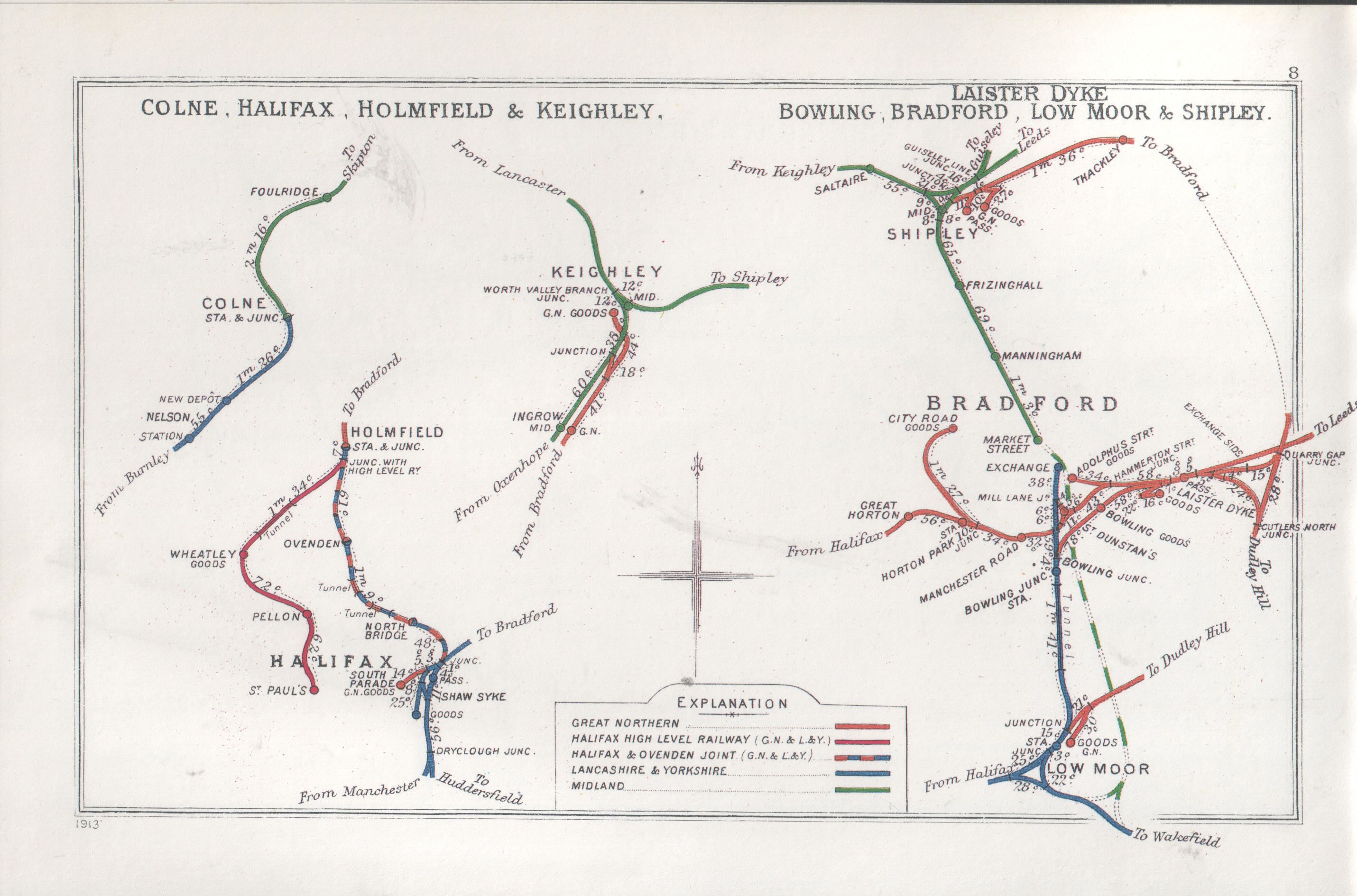
Colne, Halifax, Holmfield & Keighley Laister Dyke, Bowling, Bradford, Low Moor & Shipley RJD 8

== Post Grouping ==
In 1923, under the Railway Act 1921, the Great Northern Lines were placed into the hands of the London North Eastern Railway (LNER). The local passenger traffic under the LNER lasted only eight years before it was withdrawn. The line was retained mainly for freight workings, including some from Ingleton and Skipton in the form of limestone for Bierley Ironworks and aggregate sourced at Idle which went in the opposite direction.

In 1948 the line became part of the North Eastern Region of British Rail. (Note: The West Riding at Grouping - former GNR lines became part of the LNER and the ex Midland lines became part of the LMS.) No local passenger traffic was re-instated and the line was kept only for freight workings and as a diversionary route. The section of line south of Idle station was closed in 1964 save a small spur of line into the English Electric Foundry on Dick Lane in Thornbury. The works had their own Ruston & Hornsby shunter with final closure from the works into Laisterdyke in the 1970s. This left the section from Idle north to Shipley which was just short of 3 miles (4.8 km) and worked at a maximum speed of 25 miles (40 km) per hour under the One Engine in Steam principle. This section, along with the former GN yard at Shipley Windhill was finally closed in 1968.

== Incidents and accidents ==
On 12 May 1885, a tank engine (No. 601) at the head of a goods train from Laisterdyke to Shipley was seen to be going too fast down the hill as it approached Shipley Windhill station. It crashed through the buffers at the station and ploughed across Leeds Road (the present day A657 road) and came to rest on the waste ground opposite. The course of the train damaged two walls and the buffer stops. The engine was only two weeks old and it was noted at the time that the brakes had not failed as the brake blocks were red hot half an hour after the accident occurred. The crew jumped clear of the train before the crash and apart from cuts and bruises, there were no injuries or deaths. A very similar accident occurred at Shipley on 18 May 1916 to a goods train headed by another saddle tank, No. 845, again causing much damage but no loss of life.

On 22 February 1887, a passenger train from Bradford going to Shipley, collided with a goods train that was foul of the running lines just east of Laisterdyke station. The guard and brakesman of the goods train were found to be at fault due to neglect of their duties and were both dismissed from the company. The casualties amounted to 12 persons with minor cuts and scrapes as the collision speed was estimated at 15 miles (24 km) per hour.

== The line today ==
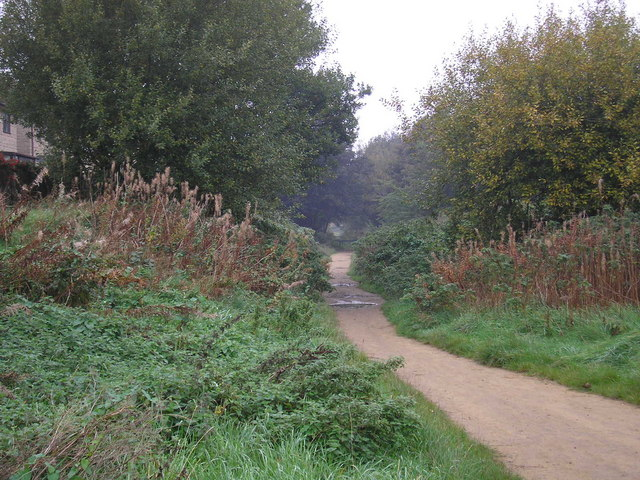
Former trackbed near Eccleshill

Very little remains of the infrastructure and buildings from the line. The impressive station is still extant at Shipley and the former station building at Thackley is now a private residence. The station building at Shipley has been in use as a business premises since the line's closure and is clearly visible from the A657 road and from the Midland station in the town centre. The station building at Eccleshill has been demolished, likewise the one at Idle which has disappeared under a road scheme. The station site at Shipley has been earmarked for development into apartments, which would mean the former station building being demolished. Architecturally, the building is the last of the three similar style stations on the line (the other two being Eccleshill & Idle) and is not a listed building.

The iron and glass canopies that stood over the platforms at Shipley Windhill and Eccleshill stations, were used to protect a filling station in Bradford from the elements. The building works to remove the items and transfer them to site on Otley Road was complete by October 1933.

The steep 1 in 50 gradient up from Shipley to Thackley can be observed when passing on a train through the Aire Valley. The gradient is to the west of the present Airedale line between Shipley and Leeds. Most of the trackbed from Idle to Laisterdyke has been built on, but its course can be traced on maps and aerial imagery.

Mark Neale, a Bradfordian author of works on railways around Bradford, has suggested that the section between Shipley Windhill and Thackley could become a cycle way or footpath much like the Great Northern Trail on another GNR line from Bradford to Halifax and Keighley. The trackbed between Shipley and Thackley is used as an unofficial footpath by local people.
