= Shipley and Windhill railway station =

Disused railway station in West Yorkshire, England

Shipley and Windhill
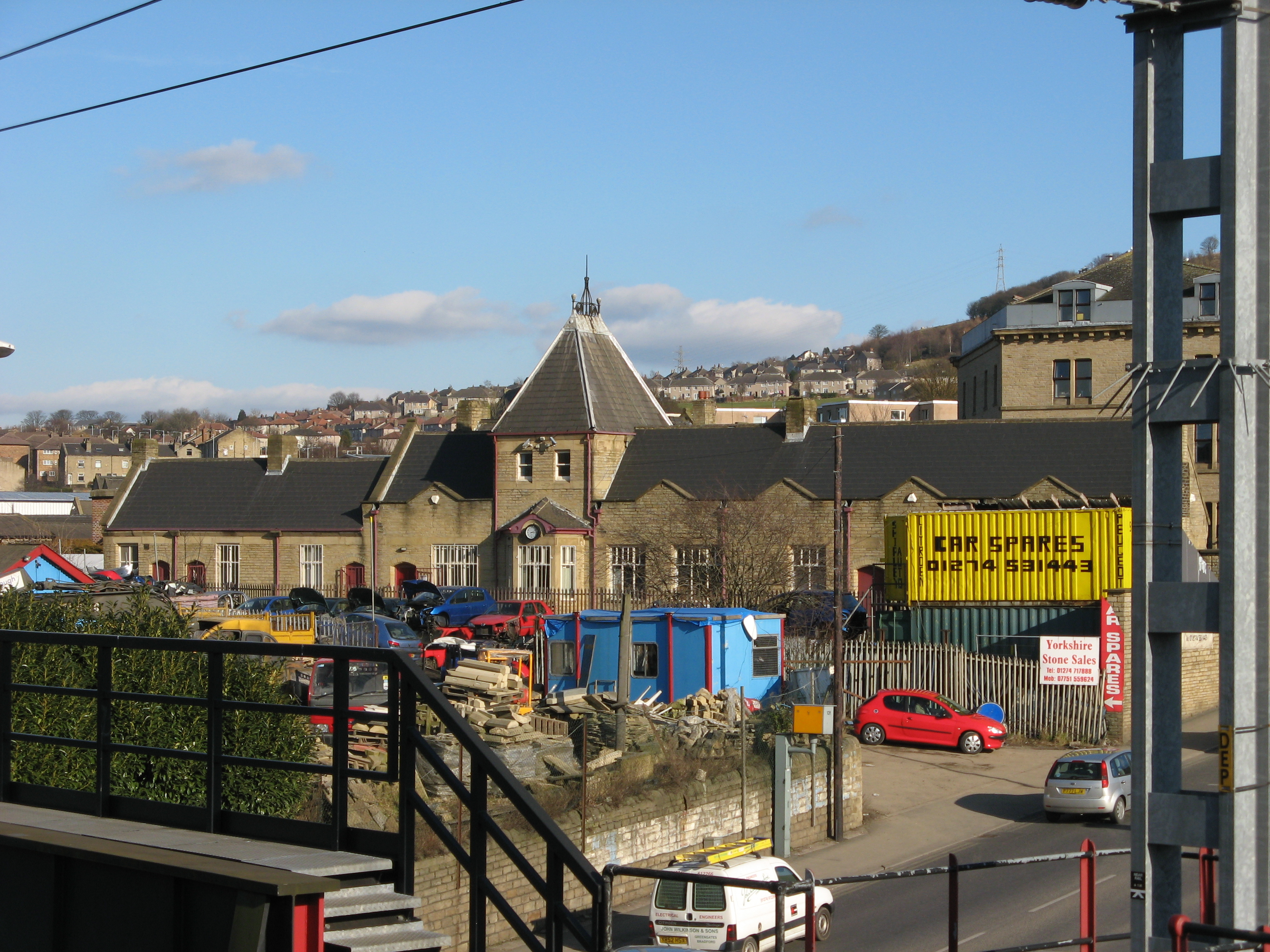
- Site of former GNR Shipley and Windhill Station

General information
- Location: Shipley, City of Bradford; England
- Coordinates: 53.8344°N 1.7700°W
- Grid reference: SE152376

Other information
- Status: Disused

History
- Original company: Idle and Shipley Railway.
- Pre-grouping: GNR
- Post-grouping: L&NER

Key dates
- 4 May 1874: Opened (goods)
- 18 January 1875: Opened (passenger)
- 2 February 1931: Closed (passenger)
- October 1964: closed completely
Location

Shipley and Windhill railway station was a railway station in Shipley, West Yorkshire, England between 1875 and 1931.

During the 1860s, two small railway companies were formed to promote suburban railways in Bradford, the Bradford, Eccleshill and Idle Railway and the Idle and Shipley Railway. Their schemes and the companies themselves were taken up by the Great Northern Railway, which built a line looping through the villages to the north-east of Bradford: from Laisterdyke, through Eccleshill, Idle and Thackley to Shipley.

The line was open to goods traffic on 4 May 1874 and to passengers on 18 January 1875.

The terminus of the new line was called Shipley and Windhill Station (According to Dewick, it was first Shipley (Great Northern) and then Shipley Bridge Street) or possibly Shipley East. The station was on the north side of Leeds Road, west of the Bradford Canal, and less than 330 yards (300 m) from the existing Shipley Station on the Midland Railway. It was built to the same distinctive pattern as other stations on the line, with a short mitre-roofed tower in the centre.

Passenger service on the line ceased on 2 February 1931, and the passenger station closed, but goods traffic continued on the whole line until October 1964 and as far as Idle until 1968.

The railway line is featured in Simon Ormondroyd's Windhill Tales, based on life in the area in 1964.

The station building survives: in 2005 it is occupied by several local businesses. However, proposals put forward in 2016 are for the building to be demolished to make way for apartments. The site has not been given any heritage designation.

Preceding station	Disused railways	Following station
Terminus	GNR; Shipley Great Northern Railway branch line	Thackley
