= Idle railway station =

Disused railway station in West Yorkshire, England

Idle

General information
- Location: Idle, West Yorkshire, City of Bradford; England
- Coordinates: 53.8358°N 1.7316°W
- Platforms: 2

Other information
- Status: Disused

History
- Original company: GNR
- Pre-grouping: GNR
- Post-grouping: L&NER

Key dates
- 15 April 1875: Opened
- 2 February 1931: Closed (passenger)
- 7 October 1968: Closed (line)
Location

Idle railway station was a railway station in Idle, West Yorkshire, England.

== History ==
During the 1860s, two small railway companies were formed to promote suburban railways in Bradford, the Bradford, Eccleshill and Idle Railway and the Idle and Shipley Railway. Their schemes - and the companies themselves - were taken up by the Great Northern Railway, which built a line looping through the villages to the north-east of Bradford: from Laisterdyke, through Eccleshill, Idle and Thackley to Shipley.

The line was open to goods traffic on 4 May 1874, and to passengers on 18 January 1875. Idle railway station opened on 15 April 1875 and was situated south of the High Street next to the Oddfellows Hall, built in 1840.

Passenger service on the line ceased on 2 February 1931 and the passenger station closed, though goods traffic continued on the whole line until October 1964 and between Shipley and Idle until 1968.

Little now remains to show that there was ever a railway station in Idle. The station was just south of the bridge where the railway crossed High Street at the junction with New Street. It then followed the route of what is now Idlecroft Road south towards Eccleshill.

== Route ==
| Preceding station | Disused railways | Following station |
|---|---|---|
| Thackley | GNR; Shipley Great Northern Railway branch line | Eccleshill |
