= Thorpe Edge =

Suburb of Bradford, West Yorkshire, England

Coordinates: 53.84°N 1.73°W

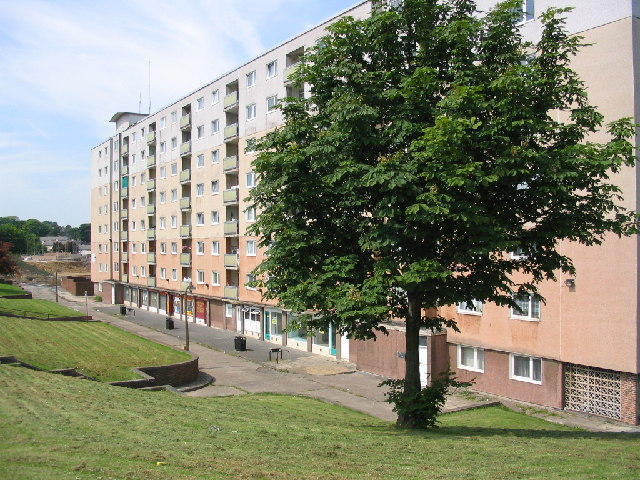
- York House

- Location within West Yorkshire
- Metropolitan borough: City of Bradford
- Metropolitan county: West Yorkshire
- Region: Yorkshire and the Humber
- Country: England
- Sovereign state: United Kingdom
- Post town: BRADFORD
- Postcode district: BD10
- Dialling code: 01274
- Police: West Yorkshire
- Fire: West Yorkshire
- Ambulance: Yorkshire

Thorpe Edge is a housing estate located in Bradford, West Yorkshire, England. The estate is situated off Harrogate Road in the north-east of the city, and borders Idle, Five Lane Ends, Greengates and Eccleshill.

== History ==
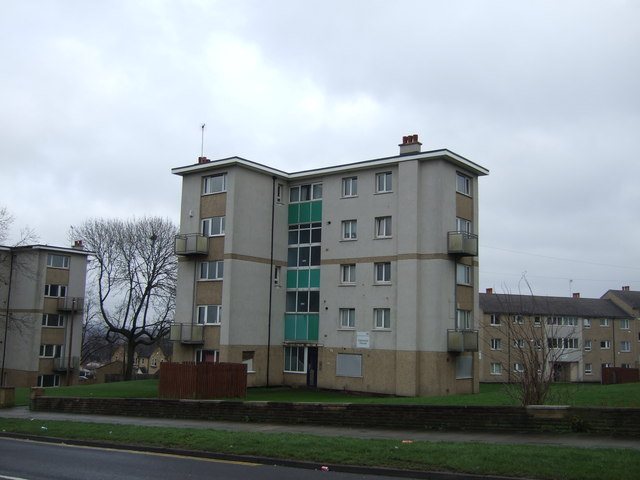
Medium rise flats to the northern side of the estate, since demolished

Once farm land, the estate was mostly constructed in the 1950s. It was constructed mostly of low-rise housing but, with two high-rise developments; the York Place flats and the Fairhaven Green flats. All of the high-rise flats are eight-storeys in height and still standing, the larger York House had shops on the ground floor. Some mid-rise flats were also constructed along the Northern edge of the estate. These were demolished in the 2010s. Some of the older low-rise houses were demolished in the 2000s. York House recently underwent a site survey and deemed unfit for purpose. Incommunities filed an application to Bradford Council for the demolition of the site, and the council agreed. Work started in the summer of 2024. Now completed in early 2025, The grounds that York House once stood, is awaiting the construction of social housing.

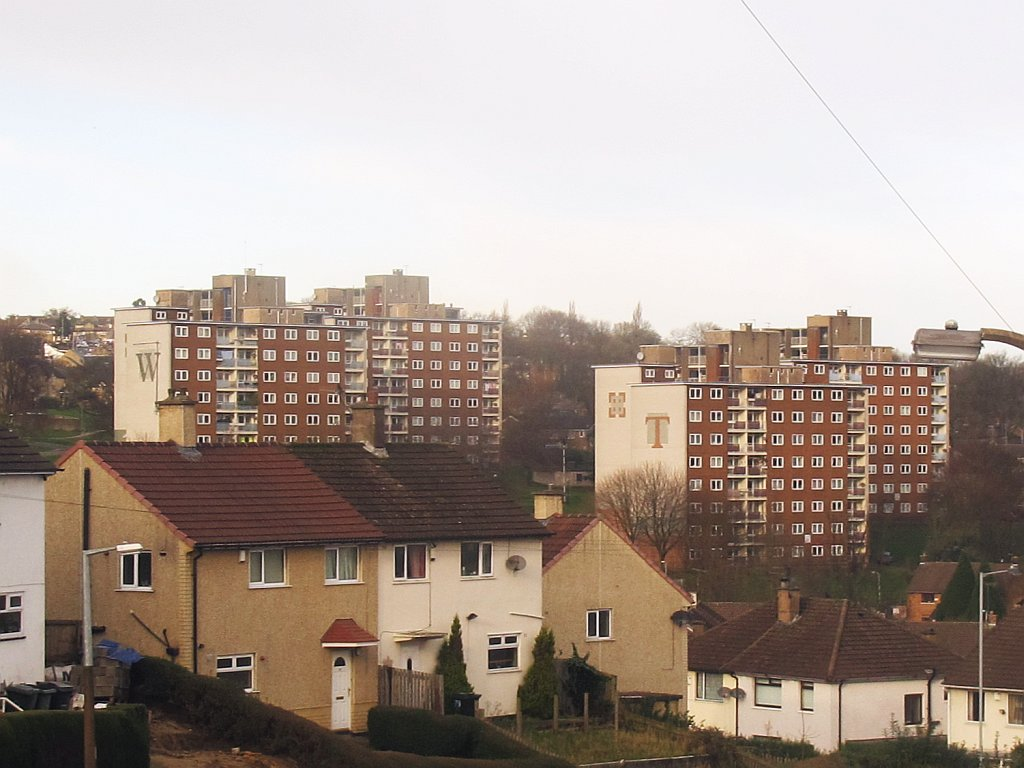
Fairhaven flats

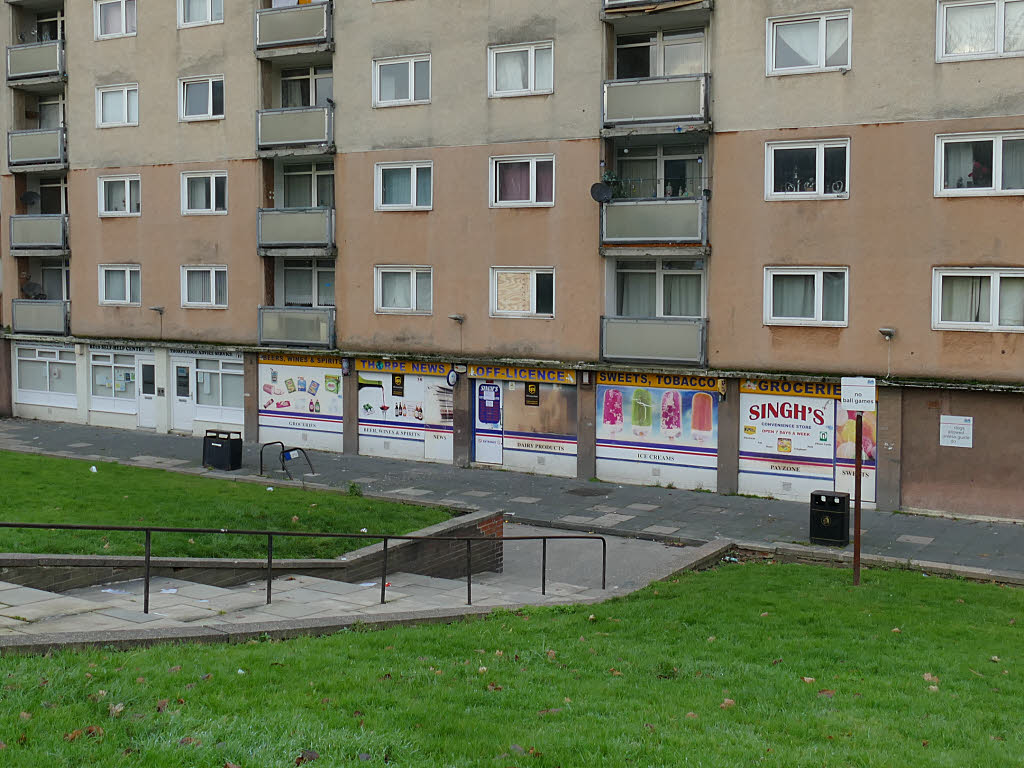
Retail shops, York House

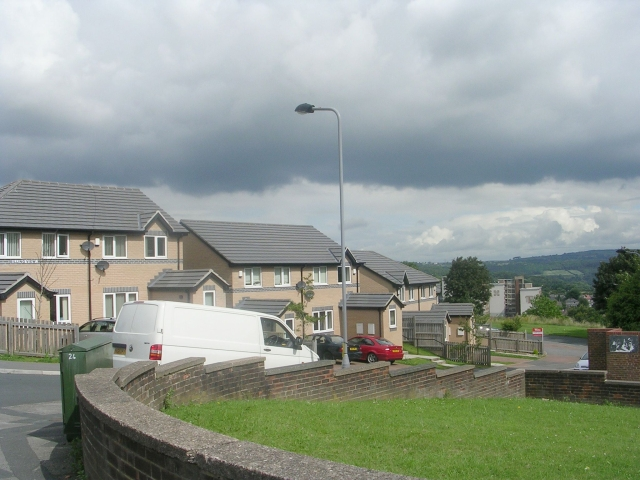
Newer 1990s built houses which replaced older low-rise housing

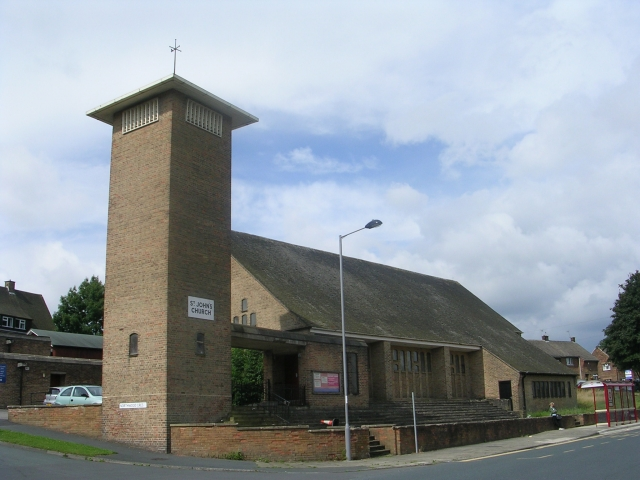
St John the Divine Church

== Amenities ==
The estate has a church; St John the Divine on Idlethorp Way, a school; Parkland Primary School. Since the demolition of York House, they are currently no shops on the estate. Thorpe Edge is surrounded by areas with a greater number of amenities such as, Enterprise Five retail park situated at Five Lane Ends. Sainsbury's supermarket and Matalan retail store is also nearby at Greengates, whilst Eccleshill swimming baths is situated at Eccleshill. Apperley Bridge railway station is approximately 1 mile away.
