= Little London, West Yorkshire =

Village in West Yorkshire, England

Coordinates: 53°51′09″N 1°41′30″W

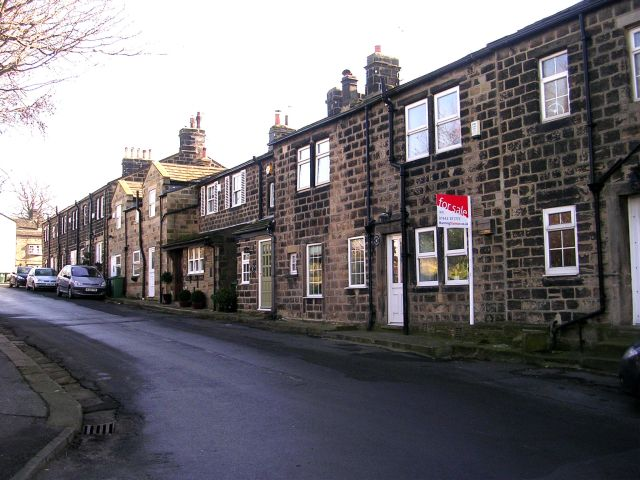
Houses along London Lane

Little London is a village in West Yorkshire, England, that is divided between the Guiseley and Rawdon and the Horsforth wards of the City of Leeds and the Idle and Thackley ward of the City of Bradford. It comprises a conservation area in the westernmost part of Rawdon town which is unique in that the historic area covered by the designation straddles the boundary of districts of Leeds and of neighbouring Bradford. Apperley Lane (A658) forms the municipal boundary.

== Geography ==
Little London occupies a spur of high ground in a dramatic position above the Aire valley. Cragg Wood is sloping down to the south, the Esholt estate is located to the west. To the northeast the land rises gradually towards Billing Hill and the moors above Yeadon. The underlying rocks consist mostly of carboniferous sandstone with Millstone Grit sandstone to the north. The sandstone was exploited in at least two quarries within or very near to today's Conservation Area and was used as a building material.

The village is located at the westernmost tip of the contiguous urbanised settlement of Rawdon which coalesces with Guiseley, the centre of which is approximately 1 mile (1.5 km) to the northeast of the conservation area. Greengates, and the edge of the Bradford urban area, is 1.2 miles (2 km) to the south of Little London. The area to the west of the conservation area is rural Green Belt, with Esholt village lying 1.2 miles (2 km) to the west of Little London in the Green Belt.

Little London, located around the main thoroughfares of Apperley Lane and Micklefield Lane, is mostly made up of long rows of former weavers cottages which contrast with large former villas and open spaces south of Micklefield Lane, and its core has retained its own distinctive character and most of its historic street pattern.

== History ==
The village probably originated as a farmstead, but due to the booming local weaving industry it grew quickly during the late 18th and early 19th century. Maps of the 18th century show a small number of buildings in the area prior to that. The oldest is Lane Head House which dates from about 1710.

The name "Little London" is first recorded on a tithe map of 1838 and refers to the farmstead; ten years later the whole settlement is so identified. Around or before 1821 London Lane was built on land connected the quarry to Micklefield Lane, and the village developed from there. It was supposedly named by local resident Benjamin Grimshaw, who had been much impressed by a visit to London. The area of Little London included a Baptist chapel and a Quaker Meeting House. The nearby joint Quaker/Baptist school which existed near the junction of Apperley Lane and Warm Lane was rebuilt in 1821 and closed in 1905 when it was sold as a private home. Another school, known as Little London School or Milligan's School after the sponsor Robert Milligan, was built in 1846 in Micklefield Lane in a vernacular Tudor style. It was also used by the Baptists as a Sunday School. From 1920 on it served as an infants school and closed in 1960. After being used for some years for storage purposes, it was converted into flats (1980).

The settlement grew further in the late 19th century when larger Victorian terraces were built, first following the auction of William White's estate in 1863, and then in 1890, the latter being characterised by mullioned windows. By the end of the 19th century Little London had grown into a largely self-contained community with a chapel, a pub, a doctor's surgery, a post office, a grocer, two butchers and a draper. However, by the year 2000 many of these services have disappeared, leaving only the pub, a hairdresser, a newsagent, and a small general store.

Until 1974 the area of Little London was part of the district Aireborough. After the local government reorganisation the village was divided between the Cities of Leeds and Bradford along the line of Apperley Lane. The portion of the conservation area lying in the City of Leeds was designated in 1975 and was extended in 1988. The portion of the conservation area lying in the City of Bradford was designated in 1977. The Bradford designation centres on Lane Head House, built for the steward of Esholt Hall Estate c. 1710–1720, with its associated cottages, and outbuildings and other mainly late 18th century development completing the designation.

== Architecture ==
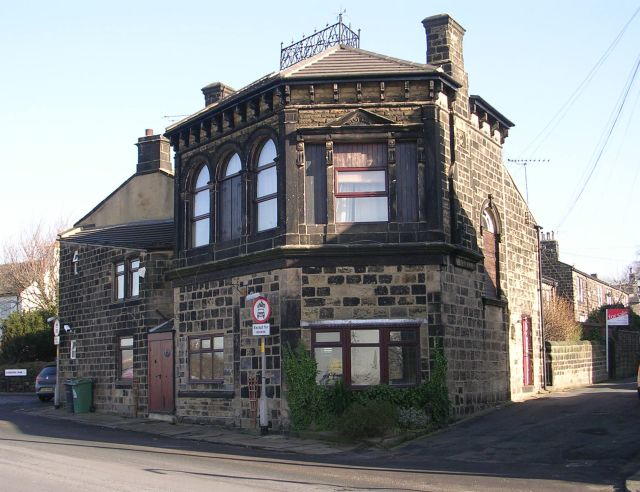
19th century houses on Apperley Lane

The historic core of the village is laid out in a formal terraced manner with two- and three-storied weaver cottages along narrow streets. South of Micklefield Lane a more formal landscape with larger houses, strong boundary treatments and a more landscaped setting is found. The late 19th century terraces are mostly two-storey buildings with grand bays, dentilled eaves, architraves and some rooms within gable features. Local sandstone is the predominant building material, with the roofs being made of stone slabs or slate. Gateposts, mall front gardens and yards bounded by stone walls with coping stones are characteristic for the village. Some traditional stone paving has survived. Only two of the key historical buildings, Buckstone Chapel and the Sunday School, were demolished in 1992.
