= Listed buildings in Idle and Thackley =

Idle and Thackley is a ward in the metropolitan borough of the City of Bradford, West Yorkshire, England. It contains 131 listed buildings that are recorded in the National Heritage List for England. Of these, two are listed at Grade II*, the middle of the three grades, and the others are at Grade II, the lowest grade. As well as the villages of Idle and Thackley, the ward includes the villages of Apperley Bridge and Greengates, and the surrounding area. The southern part of the ward is mainly residential, and the northern part is mainly rural. Most of the listed buildings are houses, cottages and associated structures, farmhouses and farm buildings. The other listed buildings include public houses, a church, a bridge, an archway to a former burial ground, a former toll house, a pair of locks on the Leeds and Liverpool Canal and an adjacent depot building, a war memorial, and a telephone kiosk.

== Key ==
Grade	Criteria
II*	Particularly important buildings of more than special interest
II	Buildings of national importance and special interest

== Buildings ==
Name and location	Photograph	Date	Notes	Grade
The George and Dragon Inn, stable and coach house 53.83746°N 1.70653°W		16th century	A public house to which a wing was added in 1704, and it has been altered since. It is in sandstone with stone slate roofs and two storeys. On the front are three gabled bays and a single-storey wing on the left. The middle bay contains a porch and a doorway, in the left bay is a two-storey canted bay window, and most of the windows are mullioned. To the rear and linked by a covered way is a stable and coach house block containing an archway.	II
369 and 371 Highfield Road, Idle; 53.83615°N 1.73473°W	—	Late 16th century	The older house is No. 369, with later additions. The houses are in sandstone with quoins, bracketed eaves, and stone slate roofs with a saddlestone on the right. There are two storeys, three bays, and a recessed extension on the left. The doorways have squared jambs, on the front are three-light mullioned windows, and the extension has a single-light window.	II
The Bridge, Apperley Bridge; 53.83774°N 1.70613°W		Late 16th or early 17th century	The bridge carries Apperley Lane over the River Aire. It is in stone and consists of two slightly pointed arches. The bridge has cutwaters and a plain parapet.	II
Plumpton House, Cottage and barn 53.83999°N 1.72407°W	—	1601	A house with a cottage added to the west and a barn to the east; the house is the oldest part, and the cottage was added in about 1800. They are in sandstone, the barn dry walled, with stone slate roofs, and two storeys. The windows in the house and cottage are mullioned, the house has a doorway with a chamfered surround and a heavy dated lintel, above which is a small lancet window, and in the cottage is a blocked first floor doorway. There are outshuts at the rear of the house and the cottage. The barn contains quoins, and has a north aisle.	II
1, 2 and 3 Warm Lane, Nether Yeadon; 53.85743°N 1.69540°W		1624	No. 1 is a farmhouse, and Nos. 2 and 3 are cottages added to the right or rebuilt in the 19th century. They all have stone slate roofs and two storeys. No. 1 is in gritstone with the gable end to the road; the gables have saddlestones and on the rear gable is a finial. The farmhouse contains one single-light window, the other windows are mullioned with some mullions removed, and they have hood moulds. In the left return is a doorway with moulded jambs and a four-centred arched head, above which is a hood mould and a dated and initialled plaque. The cottages are in sandstone, they have one bay each, the doorways in the centre have squared jambs, and the windows are mullioned with two lights.	II
30 High Street and barn, Idle; 53.83690°N 1.73175°W	—	Early 17th century (probable)	The buildings are in gritstone with a stone slate roof. The house is earlier, with the barn dating from the early 19th century. There are two storeys, the doorway has a dated lintel, and the windows are mullioned. The barn to the right has a segmental-arched cart entry with voussoirs.	II
32, 34 and 36 High Street, Idle; 53.83691°N 1.73189°W	—	Early 17th century	A block of buildings in gritstone, partly roughcast, that have stone slate roofs with a saddlestone, kneelers and a finial. There are two storeys, one of the doorways has a chamfered ogee-arched lintel, most of the windows are mullioned, with some mullions removed, and at the rear is a mullioned and transomed stair window.	II
Former Youth and Community Centre; 53.83745°N 1.73297°W		1630	Built as a chapel of ease, it has since been used for a variety of other purposes. It is in gritstone on a plinth, with quoins, and a stone slate roof with coped gables, shaped kneelers, and ball finials. On the south front are two doorways with ogee heads, and straight-headed windows with mullions and round-headed lights. The large west window is Perpendicular in style with round-headed lights in rows of diminishing size.	II*
The Grange; 53.83851°N 1.73182°W	—	1632	A house that was enlarged and refaced in 1734, it is in gritstone and sandstone, with quoins, and a stone slate roof with saddlestones, kneelers and carved finials. There are two storeys, three bays, and two rear gabled wings. The central doorway has a four-centred arch in a square surround, over which is a hood mould and a dated and initialled panel. To its left is a rectangular bay window, and the windows are mullioned and transomed.	II
North Hall Farmhouse; 53.84574°N 1.73606°W	—	1649	The farmhouse is in gritstone, and has a stone slate roof with saddlestones and kneelers. There are two storeys, and it contains a doorway with a chamfered surround, and a four-centred arch in a squared head with a dated and initialled lintel. The windows are mullioned.	II
1–11 Town Lane, Idle; 53.83776°N 1.73304°W	—	17th century	A group of cottages that were rebuilt and extended in the 18th century. They are in sandstone, partly rendered, with stone slate roofs. They have two storeys and form an L-shaped plan. One doorway has a chamfered surround and an ogee-shaped lintel, and the other doorways have squared jambs. Most of the windows are mullioned with two or three lights, and some mullions have been removed.	II
Blenheim Place; 53.84025°N 1.73284°W	—	17th century	A group of cottages in an L-shaped plan, they are in rendered sandstone and have stone slate roofs and two storeys. The doorways have squared jambs, and the windows are mullioned, some with hood moulds.	II
Crow Trees Farm, Crow Trees House, Myers Crow Trees, Rose Cottage and Underdown; 53.84941°N 1.69802°W	—	17th century	A farmhouse, cottages and a barn, possibly with earlier material, forming an L-shaped plan. They are in gritstone with quoins, and stone slate roofs with saddlestones and shaped kneelers. The farmhouse has a gabled porch, and a doorway with a chamfered surround and an initialled and dated lintel. The other doorways have squared jambs, and the windows are mullioned.	II
Elm Tree Farmhouse and barn 53.83745°N 1.70889°W	—	17th century	The farmhouse and barn, which was added in the 19th century, are in sandstone and gritstone, with stone slate roofs. The farmhouse has two storeys, and three bays, the right bay lower. In the left part is a doorway and mullioned windows with mullions removed, and the right bay has a four-light mullioned window in each floor. The barn is to the left.	II
Barn and stables, Ghyll Fold; 53.85607°N 1.69997°W	—	17th century or earlier	The barn is the older part, it is in gritstone, with a stone slate roof and a recessed portal. The interior is timber framed and there is a double aisle. The stables are at right angles, in gritstone and sandstone, and have a gabled stone slate roof with shaped kneelers. There are two storeys, and the stables contain mullioned windows and a doorway with squared jambs. External stone steps lead up to a loft door with a moulded round head.	II
Little Cote Farmhouse and barn 53.84131°N 1.73992°W	—	17th century	The farmhouse, which was largely rebuilt later, is in sandstone with quoins and a stone slate roof. There are two storeys, the doorway has squared jambs, and the windows are mullioned with two or three lights. To the left is a lower barn.	II
Low Ash Farmhouse; 53.84594°N 1.72754°W	—	17th century (probable)	The farmhouse was refronted in about 1800. The front is in sandstone, the rest of the building is in gritstone, and it has quoins and a stone slate roof. The doorway has squared jambs, and the windows are mullioned with three or four lights.	II
2–5 Laburnum Place, Apperley Bridge; 53.83635°N 1.70780°W		Late 17th century	Probably originally a farmhouse that was altered and extended in the 18th century when No. 5 was added. The building is in gritstone with stone slate roofs and two storeys. No. 3 has a doorway with a chamfered four-centred arched head and a lintel dated 1674. The lintel of the doorway to No. 4 is dated 1727. The windows of Nos. 2–4 are mullioned, and some have been replaced. No. 5 is taller, and has rusticated quoins, a dentilled eaves cornice, and coped gables. In the ground floor is an inserted window and the upper floor contains a tripartite lunette window.	II
26 Westfield Lane and barn, Idle; 53.83748°N 1.73426°W	—	Late 17th century	A former farmhouse and barn, they are in gritstone with a string course and a stone slate roof. There are two storeys, three bays, and a rear outshut. The doorway has squared jambs, the windows are mullioned, and in the rear outshut is a mullioned and transomed window.	II
32 and 40 Westfield Lane, Idle; 53.83754°N 1.73492°W	—	Late 17th century	A gritstone house with a string course, and a stone slate roof with saddlestones and prominent kneelers. There are two storeys, three bays, and a rear wing. The doorway has chamfered jambs, a four-centred arched head, and a large squared lintel. The windows are mullioned, with five lights in the ground floor and four in the upper floor. In the rear wing is a mullioned and transomed window and a round-arched window.	II
Cote Farmhouse, outbuilding and barn 53.83996°N 1.74451°W	—	Late 17th century	The original farmhouse, later used as an outbuilding, was later extended and a new farmhouse was added in the late 18th century. The buildings are in sandstone, with some gritstone in the original part, and a stone slate roof with coped gables and kneelers. There are mullioned windows in all parts and doorways with squared jambs, and the later farmhouse has quoins.	II
Crow Trees; 53.83826°N 1.73276°W	—	Late 17th century	A house that was refronted in about 1750, it is in gritstone at the rear and sandstone elsewhere, with quoins, bands, and a stone slate roof with prominent kneelers. There are two storeys, a symmetrical front of three bays, and a recessed single-storey wing on the right. The central doorway has rusticated jambs and a lintel with a keystone. The window above the doorway has a Gibbs surround, the windows in the outer bays are mullioned with two lights, and in the west gable end is a Venetian window.	II
Ghyll Fold House and Farmhouse; 53.85579°N 1.70019°W	—	Late 17th century	The building, which was later restored and altered, is in gritstone, and has a stone slate roof with saddlestones and carved finials. There are two storeys and an attic, a central range, gabled cross-wings, and a further wing to the west with one and two storeys. The doorway has squared jambs, and the windows are mullioned, some with hood moulds.	II
Archway, Westfield Lane, Idle; 53.83674°N 1.73972°W	—	1690	The archway to a former Quaker burial ground is in gritstone and has quoins and coping. It consists of a four-centred arch with chamfered jambs, and above the centre is the date.	II
Building north of Home Farmhouse, Esholt Hall Home Farm; 53.85242°N 1.71180°W	—	1691	A former farmhouse in gritstone with quoins, and a stone slate roof with saddlestones and moulded kneelers. There are two storeys and three bays. The central doorway has moulded jambs, and an elaborate ogee-arched lintel inscribed with initials and the date. The windows are mullioned, and there is a continuous hood mould over the ground floor openings.	II*
997 Harrogate Road, Greengates; 53.83377°N 1.70861°W		17th or early 18th century	The house, which was refaced and altered in about 1800, is in sandstone with some gritstone blocks, and a stone slate roof. There are two storeys, one bay at the front, a wider gabled bay on the left return, and a rear outshut. On the front is a doorway with a sash window to the left and a blocked window above. The left return contains a broad three-light mullioned window in each floor. In front of the forecourt are cast iron railings.	II
25 and 27 Stockhill Fold, Greengates; 53.83311°N 1.71480°W	—	Late 17th or early 18th century	A farmhouse that was altered in about 1786, it is in gritstone with quoins and a stone slate roof with a saddlestone and prominent kneelers. The doorways have squared jambs, and the windows are mullioned, with some mullions removed.	II
Barn to rear of 17th-century farmhouse, Esholt Hall Home Farm; 53.85255°N 1.71170°W	—	Late 17th or early 18th century	The barn is in gritstone and has a stone slate roof with saddlestones. In the south gable end is a two-light chamfered mullioned window and a doorway with a large triangular lintel. On the west side is a recessed portal.	II
Gate piers southeast of Esholt Hall; 53.85077°N 1.71303°W	—	c. 1707	The gate piers flanking the original southern approach to the hall now stand in open grassland. They are in stone and have arched apertures on the shafts and cornices.	II
Haigh Hall; 53.83127°N 1.71499°W		1710	A gritstone house with string courses, and a stone slate roof with coped gables and thin kneelers. There are two storeys and a symmetrical front of three bays. In the centre is a gabled porch, and an arched doorway with imposts and a keystone. Above the doorway is a panel with a moulded frame containing initials and the date, above which is a circular window. The other windows are mullioned, with some mullions removed, containing small-paned sashes.	II
Lane Head House; 53.85223°N 1.69411°W	—	c. 1710–20	The house was extended in about 1800 and refronted in 1911. It is in gritstone with chamfered quoins on the lower two floors, and quoin pilasters on the top floor, moulded sill bands, a moulded modillioned eaves cornice, and a hipped stone slate roof. There are three storeys and five bays. The central doorway has an architrave and a cornice. The windows, which are sashes, also have architraves, those in the lower two floors are tall, and in the top floor they are square; the central window in the top floor has a scrolled head, a keystone and an apron.	II
Booth Royd; 53.84080°N 1.73298°W	—	1745	A cottage in a row, it is in gritstone with quoins, and a stone slate roof with prominent coped kneelers. The doorway has squared jambs, and the windows are mullioned, with five lights to the left of the doorway, two lights to the right with some mullions removed, and four lights in the upper floor.	II
90 and 92 Bradford Road, Idle; 53.83121°N 1.73211°W	—	Mid 18th century	A pair of sandstone cottages with a stone slate roof. There are two storeys, the doorways have plain surrounds, and the windows are mullioned with two lights.	II
Park Place; 53.84378°N 1.72815°W	—	18th century (probable)	A row of cottages, some added in about 1800. They are in sandstone with quoins, and stone slate roofs with saddlestones and shaped kneelers. There are two storeys, the doorways have square jambs, the doorway of No. 5 has a massive lintel, and the windows are mullioned with two lights.	II
The Brewery Tap; 53.83457°N 1.72730°W		18th century (probable)	A house that was extended in the 19th century and converted into a public house in the 1980s, it is in sandstone with a stone slate roof. There are two storeys, a two-bay range facing the road, and an older range at right angles to the rear. The front range has quoins and dentilled eaves. The right bay is taller, and the left bay contains a gabled dormer. The windows are mullioned with two lights and contain sashes, and the doorway has a fanlight.	II
Park House; 53.84323°N 1.72815°W	—	1752	The house, which was later refronted, is in sandstone on a plinth, with a band, rusticated quoins, a moulded eaves cornice, and a stone slate roof with coped gables and shaped kneelers. There are two storeys and a symmetrical front of five bays. The doorway and windows have architraves, on the front the windows are sashes and at the rear they are mullioned. A rainwater head is initialled and dated. The house stands in a walled garden.	II
363, 365 and 367 Highfield Road, Idle; 53.83599°N 1.73486°W	—	1761	A sandstone house, later divided, it has rusticated quoins with moulding at the top, bracketed eaves, and a stone slate roof with saddlestones and shaped kneelers. There are two storeys, a symmetrical front of three bays, and an outshut on the right. The central doorway has squared jambs, above it is a square initialled and dated panel and a single-light window, and in the outer bays are two-light mullioned windows.	II
16–22 Carr Bottom Road, Greengates; 53.83181°N 1.70969°W		Mid to late 18th century	A row of sandstone cottages with quoins, and a stone slate roof with prominent kneelers on the gable ends. There are two storeys and each cottage has one bay. The doorways have squared jambs, most of the windows have been replaced by casements, and two cottages have retained two-light mullioned windows.	II
830 Harrogate Road, Greengates; 53.83179°N 1.71094°W		Mid to late 18th century	The house, which was extended in about 1800, is in sandstone, with a band, block brackets to the eaves, and a stone slate roof. The original part has two storeys and a symmetrical front of three bays. The central doorway has a moulded architrave, a slightly pulvinated frieze, a moulded pediment, and a gable with moulded coping and ball finials. The windows are mullioned, with two lights above the doorway and four lights in the outer bays. To the left is a three-storey extension containing two-light mullioned windows.	II
37–43 Albion Road and 5 and 7 Union Yard, Idle; 53.83464°N 1.72828°W	—	Mid to late 18th century	The buildings are in sandstone with stone slate roofs and two storeys. The oldest are Nos. 41 and 43 Albion Road, a pair of cottages with quoins, and console brackets to the eaves. The doorways have squared jambs, and most of the windows are mullioned, with some mullions removed. The other buildings date from the early 19th century, they form a back to back block, and contain sash windows.	II
29, 31 and 33 The Green, Idle; 53.83510°N 1.72990°W	—	Mid to late 18th century	The buildings are in sandstone with stone slate roofs. The oldest are Nos. 31 and 33, a pair of cottages, later used as shops. They have two storeys, and a band. Each cottage has a shop front and a doorway in the ground floor and mullioned windows above. No. 29 on the left dates from about 1800, it has three storeys and a two-light mullioned window in each floor.	II
6 and 10 Westfield Lane, Idle; 53.83746°N 1.73346°W	—	Mid to late 18th century	A cottage, later divided into two, it is in roughcast gritstone, and has a stone slate roof and two storeys. The doorway has squared jambs, and most of the windows are mullioned with two or three lights.	II
Busfield House; 53.85631°N 1.70198°W	—	Mid to late 18th century	A sandstone farmhouse with quoins, a stone slate roof, and two storeys. On the front is a later gabled porch above which is a single-light window, and the other windows are mullioned with two or three lights.	II
Home Farmhouse, Esholt Hall; 53.85231°N 1.71171°W	—	Mid to late 18th century	The farmhouse is in sandstone and has a stone slate roof with shaped kneelers. There are two storeys and three bays. The doorway has squared jambs, and the windows are mullioned with two or three lights.	II
28–34 Ley Fleaks Road, Idle; 53.83321°N 1.73163°W		Late 18th century	A row of four sandstone cottages with quoins, and stone slate roofs. There are two storeys, and No. 34 projects. The doorways have squared jambs, and most of the windows are mullioned with two lights.	II
1, 3 and 5 Westfield Lane, Idle; 53.83729°N 1.73356°W	—	Late 18th century	A row of three cottages that were altered in the 19th century. They are in gritstone and have stone slate roofs. There are two storeys and each cottage has one bay. The doorways have squared jambs, shop fronts and windows have been inserted into the ground floor, and in the upper floor are mullioned windows with some mullions removed.	II
26A and 30 Westfield Lane and barn, Idle; 53.83750°N 1.73460°W	—	Late 18th century	A cottage with a barn to the east, they are in sandstone, part of the barn is dry walled, with a stone slate roof. There are 1½ storeys and a rear outshut. The doorway in the cottage has a doorway with squared jambs, a two-light mullioned window, and a sash window. The barn has a doorway with a heavy lintel.	II
37 and 39 Westfield Lane, Idle; 53.83727°N 1.73481°W	—	Late 18th century	A pair of sandstone cottages with stone slate roofs. No. 39 is smaller, and has a doorway with squared jambs and a single-light window on the ground floor, and a three-light mullioned window above. No. 37 is taller, and has a sill band, a cornice and a blocking course. There are three bays, the doorway has squared jambs, and the windows are sashes.	II
55, 57 and 59 Park Road, Thackley; 53.84542°N 1.73154°W	—	Late 18th century	A house with an extension added at an angle to the rear in the 19th century, in sandstone with stone slate roofs. The doorways have squared jambs and the windows are mullioned with some mullions removed.	II
Birk Hill Farmhouse and barn 53.84598°N 1.73317°W	—	Late 18th century	A sandstone farmhouse that has a stone slate roof with saddlestones and rear kneelers. There are two storeys and three bays. The central doorway has a plain surround, above it is a single-light window, the other windows are mullioned with some mullions removed, and at the rear is a single-storey barn.	II
Carcase End Farmhouse and barn 53.83690°N 1.74176°W	—	Late 18th century	The farmhouse and attached barn are in sandstone with quoins and a stone slate roof. There are two storeys, the house has a doorway with squared jambs, and the windows are mullioned sashes with two lights. In the barn is a semicircular-arched cart entry with voussoirs.	II
Commercial Inn and 63 and 65 Park Road, Thackley; 53.84535°N 1.73169°W		Late 18th century	Originally a farmhouse and a barn to the right converted in about 1830–40 into a public house and two cottages. They are in sandstone with quoins, bracketed eaves, and a stone slate roof. The public house has a symmetrical front of three bays, the doorway has squared jambs, above it is a single-light window, and the other windows are mullioned with two lights. Each cottage has one bay, and the doorways and windows are similar.	II
Dog and Gun Public House; 53.83384°N 1.70854°W		Late 18th century	The public house is in sandstone, the ground floor roughcast, and it has a stone slate roof with kneelers at the rear. There are three storeys and three bays, the right bay projecting slightly. In the ground floor is a public house front, most of the windows are mullioned, and in the north gable end are blind round-headed windows.	II
Home Farm Cottage, Esholt Hall Home Farm; 53.85239°N 1.71160°W	—	Late 18th century	A sandstone cottage with a stone slate roof and two storeys. The doorway has squared jambs, and the windows are mullioned with three lights.	II
Mill Holme Farmhouse and barn 53.83623°N 1.71639°W	—	Late 18th century	The farmhouse and barn are in sandstone with quoins and a slate roof. There are two storeys, and the windows are mullioned casements in squared surrounds, with three and four lights.	II
North Street Farmhouse; 53.84603°N 1.73111°W	—	Late 18th century	The farmhouse is in sandstone with quoins, and a stone slate roof with saddlestones and shaped kneelers. There are two storeys, the central doorway has squared jambs, and the windows are mullioned.	II
Simpson Green Farmhouse, Farm Cottage, barn and outbuildings 53.83964°N 1.72288°W	—	Late 18th century	This consists of a farmhouse and barn under one roof, a cottage added to the west in about 1800, and a range of outbuildings to the rear in an L-shaped plan. They are in sandstone with stone slate roofs, the farmhouse has two storeys and the outbuildings at the rear have one storey. The farmhouse has quoins and two-light mullioned windows, the doorways have squared jambs, and the gable end of the barn has a saddlestone and kneelers.	II
The Stansfield Arms and barn 53.83905°N 1.70437°W		Late 18th century (probable)	The public house and attached barn are at right angles to the road. They are in sandstone with quoins, and a stone slate roof with saddlestones and shaped kneelers. There are two storeys, a double-depth plan, and two gables facing the road. Most of the windows are mullioned, and in the former barn is an inserted mullioned and transomed window.	II
Walk Hill Farmhouse; 53.84273°N 1.70420°W	—	Late 18th century	The farmhouse, which was later extended to the left, is in sandstone, with quoins, and a stone slate roof with saddlestones. There are two storeys and two bays, the doorway has a plain surround, and the windows are mullioned with two lights.	II
291 and 293 Apperley Road, Apperley Bridge; 53.83769°N 1.71318°W		c. 1776	A pair of sandstone cottages with quoins and a stone slate roof. There are two storeys and each cottage has one bay. The doorways in the outer parts have squared frames, and the windows are mullioned, those on the front with two lights, and those in the left gable end with three.	II
Barn east of 293 Apperley Road, Apperley Bridge; 53.83779°N 1.71299°W	—	c. 1776	The barn is in stone with quoins and a stone slate roof. The gable end faces the road.	II
Field House; 53.83743°N 1.71309°W	—	c. 1776	A former toll house for the Leeds and Liverpool Canal that was rebuilt in about 1840. It is in sandstone with consoles to the eaves and a stone slate roof. There are two storeys and a basement, and a single-storey outhouse. The doorway has a rectangular fanlight, and in the original part is a two-light mullioned window.	II
13 and 15 Stockhill House, Greengates; 53.83288°N 1.71485°W	—	1786	A sandstone house with rusticated quoins, a band, and a stone slate roof. There are two storeys, four bays, and a projecting wing with a hipped roof. The doorways have squared jambs, and above the main doorway is an initialled and dated plaque. The windows are sashes.	II
17 Stockhill Fold, Greengates; 53.83292°N 1.71487°W	—	c. 1786	Originally the rear wing to a larger house, it is in sandstone with a stone slate roof. There are three storeys, the doorway has squared jambs, the windows are mullioned with two lights and sashes in the top floor.	II
19, 21 and 23 Stockhill Fold, Greengates; 53.83303°N 1.71496°W	—	c. 1786	A row of cottages developed from the rear wing of a larger house. They are in sandstone with a sill band, and a stone slate roof. There are two storeys, the doorways have squared jambs, and most of the windows are mullioned. No. 23 is rendered and has a sash window in the upper floor.	II
29 and 31 Stockhill Fold, Greengates; 53.83314°N 1.71461°W	—	c. 1786	A pair of gritstone cottages with sandstone quoins and a stone slate roof. There are two storeys, the doorways have squared jambs, above each doorway is a sash window and the other windows have three lights and mullions, with the central light higher.	II
33 Stockhill Fold, Greengates; 53.83317°N 1.71446°W	—	c. 1786	A sandstone cottage with quoins and a stone slate roof. There are two storeys, and the doorways have squared jambs. The windows in the ground floor have small panes, and in the upper floor they have three lights and mullions, with the central light higher.	II
1 and 3 Burnwells, Thackley; 53.84444°N 1.73819°W	—	1791	A pair of sandstone houses with quoins and a stone slate roof. There are three storeys, the doorways have squared jambs, some windows have single lights, and the others are mullioned with three lights.	II
1 Greenfield Lane, Idle; 53.83763°N 1.73366°W	—	c. 1800	Originally probably a farmhouse, it was later converted for other purposes, and a cottage was added. The buildings are in sandstone, they have stone slate roofs with kneelers, and two storeys. The doorways have squared jambs, and the windows are mullioned.	II
8 and 10 Thorp Garth, Idle; 53.83315°N 1.73023°W	—	c. 1800	A pair of sandstone cottages with stone slate roofs and two storeys. The doorways have squared jambs, some of the windows are mullioned with two lights, and others have single lights.	II
46, 48 and 50 Town Lane, Idle; 53.83951°N 1.73201°W	—	c. 1800	A row of three painted sandstone houses with a stone slate roof and three storeys. The doorways have squared jambs, some of the windows are mullioned, and others have been altered.	II
9 and 11 Union Yard, Idle; 53.83483°N 1.72837°W	—	c. 1800	A pair of sandstone cottages with quoins and a stone slate roof. They have two storeys, the doorways have squared jambs, and the mullions have been removed from the windows.	II
23, 25 and 27 Westfield Lane and barn, Idle; 53.83716°N 1.73424°W	—	c. 1800	Built as back to back houses with a barn range added to the east, they are in sandstone with stone slate roofs. The doorways have squared jambs, some with gabled hoods, and the windows are mullioned. In the barn is a segmental-headed archway with voussoirs and a keystone.	II
4–10 Burnwells and 43 and 45 Thackley Road, Thackley; 53.84490°N 1.73816°W	—	1800	A group of back to back houses in sandstone with quoins and a stone slate roof. They have two or three storeys, the doorways have squared jambs, some windows have single lights, and the others are mullioned with three lights.	II
1 and 3 Ellar Carr Road, Thackley; 53.83968°N 1.72568°W	—	c. 1800	A pair of sandstone cottages with quoins, and a stone slate roof with saddlestones. There are two storeys and each cottage has one bay. The doorways have squared jambs, and the windows are mullioned with two lights.	II
163 and 165 Park Road, Thackley; 53.84372°N 1.72844°W	—	c. 1800	A pair of cottages at the end of a row, they are in sandstone with quoins, and a stone slate roof. There are two storeys and each cottage has one bay. The doorways have squared jambs, and the windows are mullioned with two lights.	II
167–173 Park Road, Thackley; 53.84361°N 1.72846°W	—	c. 1800	A row of four cottages in sandstone with quoins, a stone slate roof, and two storeys. The doorways have squared jambs, some windows have single lights, some are mullioned, and others have been altered.	II
33–39 Windhill Old Road, Thackley; 53.84447°N 1.74027°W	—	c. 1800	A farmhouse converted into cottages, it is in gritstone with quoins, and a stone slate roof with saddlestones and shaped kneelers. There are two storeys, the doorways have squared jambs, the windows are mullioned with two or three lights, some mullions have been removed, and in the left gable end is a Venetian window.	II
52 and 54 Windhill Old Road, Thackley; 53.84295°N 1.74390°W	—	c. 1800	A pair of sandstone cottages with a stone slate roof. There are two storeys, the doorways have squared jambs, the windows are mullioned, in No. 52 with three lights, and in No. 54 with two.	II
All Alone; 53.82990°N 1.74042°W	—	c. 1800	A row of three cottages with stone slate roofs, two storeys, two bays each, and openings with squared surrounds. The left two cottages form a pair, and have quoins, an eaves cornice, and a cornice above one doorway. The right cottage is lower, roughcast, and has a saddlestone and a prominent kneeler.	II
Works depot building, Dobson Locks; 53.83968°N 1.71626°W		c. 1800	The works building is adjacent to the upper end of Dobson Locks on the Leeds and Liverpool Canal. It is in sandstone with a stone slate roof. The main block has two storeys, and contains four windows and two hatches. To the right is a single-storey office with a doorway and flanking windows.	II
Park Hill Farmhouse; 53.84260°N 1.72525°W	—	c. 1800	A sandstone house with a stone slate roof, two storeys, and a rear outshut. The doorway has squared jambs, and the windows are mullioned with three lights.	II
Garth Fold; 53.83709°N 1.73213°W	—	Late 18th and early 19th century	A former coach house and cottages forming an L-shaped plan around a partly cobbled yard. They are in sandstone, partly pebbledashed, with stone slate roofs. The doorways have plain surrounds, the windows are mullioned, and some have been altered.	II
Barn by entrance to Esholt Hall Home Farm; 53.85229°N 1.71084°W	—	Late 18th or early 19th century	The barn, later used for other purposes, is in stone with a stone slate roof. The roof is supported by sandstone piers.	II
Barn, cow shed and cart shed, Esholt Hall Home Farm; 53.85275°N 1.71141°W	—	Late 18th or early 19th century	The farm buildings are in sandstone with stone slate roofs, and form an L-shaped plan. The front of the barn is partly open with stone piers, and partly weatherboarded, and the cart shed also has stone piers at the front.	II
Stable, tack shed and cow shed wing, Esholt Hall Home Farm; 53.85233°N 1.71129°W	—	c. 1800	The farm buildings are in sandstone with stone slate roofs, they have three storeys, and form an L-shaped plan. In the ground floor are doorways with square jambs, and cart entries, the middle floor contains windows and hatches, and in the top floor are square openings. On the north gable end is a pedimented bellcote, and there are two external flights of steps.	II
Lane Head Cottage and Mews Cottage; 53.85247°N 1.69404°W	—	c. 1800	A pair of sandstone cottages with quoins and a stone slate roof. There are two storeys, the doorways have squared jambs, and the windows are mullioned with two or three lights.	II
Town Well Cottages; 53.83678°N 1.73183°W	—	c. 1800	A pair of cottages in roughcast stone with a stone slate roof on a sloping site. They have two and three storeys, paired doorways with plain surrounds, and two-light mullioned windows containing sashes.	II
Back Lane Farmhouse, barn and stable 53.83693°N 1.73469°W	—	c. 1800–10	The buildings are in sandstone with stone slate roofs. The farmhouse has two storeys and three bays. The doorway has squared jambs, and the windows contain modern glazing. The wing to the west was formerly a barn and stables, and there is a ventilator on the ridge.	II
1–4 Waterloo Crescent and 13 Parkin Lane, Apperley Bridge; 53.83642°N 1.70436°W		c. 1800–20	A row of sandstone cottages with quoins and a stone slate roof with kneelers on the northeast gable end. There are two storeys, the doorways have squared jambs, and the windows are mullioned with three lights.	II
3, 5 and 7 Cross Road, Idle; 53.83702°N 1.72650°W	—	c. 1800–20	A row of three sandstone cottages with stone slate roofs. There are two storeys, each cottage has two bays, and projecting from the front of No. 7 is a former low house. The central doorways have squared jambs, and the windows are mullioned, with two lights at the front and three at the rear.	II
2 Greenfield Lane and 14–22 Westfield Lane, Idle; 53.83744°N 1.73384°W	—	c. 1800–20	A row of cottages, Nos. 20 and 22 later and higher. They are in sandstone with stone slate roofs. There are two storeys and each cottage has one bay. The doorways have squared jambs, and most of the windows are mullioned.	II
7 and 9 Howgate and 22 ButtsLane, Idle; 53.83575°N 1.72753°W	—	c. 1800–20	A row of sandstone cottages with stone slate roofs and two storeys. The doorways have squared jambs, and the windows are mullioned with two or three lights.	II
34 Westfield Lane, Idle; 53.83764°N 1.73473°W	—	c. 1800–20	A sandstone cottage with a rendered front and a stone slate roof. There are two storeys and two bays. The central doorway has squared jambs, and the windows are mullioned, with two or three lights.	II
3–21 Park Road, Thackley; 53.84497°N 1.73344°W		c. 1800–20	A row of houses and cottages in sandstone, with spaced corbels to the eaves, and stone slate roofs. Nos. 7 and 9 have two storeys and the houses on each side have three. The windows are mullioned with two or three lights.	II
47–53 Park Road, Thackley; 53.84517°N 1.73210°W	—	c. 1800–20	A row of four sandstone cottages with a stone slate roof. There are two storeys, and each cottage has one bay. The doorways have squared jambs, some of the windows are mullioned with two lights, and others have been altered.	II
13–18 Laburnum Place, Apperley Bridge; 53.83609°N 1.70679°W	—	c. 1800–30	A row of cottages in sandstone with stone slate roofs. There are two storeys, and Nos. 16 and 18 are slightly taller. The doorways have squared jambs, the windows are mullioned, with three lights in the upper floor and two in the ground floor, and some have been altered. At the rear of Nos. 16 and 18 is a blocked dovecote opening.	II
11–39 Crag Hill Road, Thackley; 53.84366°N 1.73549°W	—	c. 1800–30	A terrace of sandstone houses with stone slate roofs, two or three storeys, and rear cottage rows. The doorways have plain surrounds, some of the windows have single lights, others are mullioned with two lights, and some mullions have been removed. No.26 has three storeys and a gabled front, and to its left is a passage archway to the rear cottages.	II
Dobson Locks; 53.83929°N 1.71605°W		c. 1800–40	A two-rise set of locks on the Leeds and Liverpool Canal. The walls are in stone and there is a paved side shoot. The lock gates are in timber and iron.	II
287 Apperley Road, Apperley Bridge; 53.83729°N 1.71435°W	—	c. 1820–30	A sandstone house with sill bands, paired eaves brackets, and a stone slate roof. There are two storeys and three bays. The central doorway has a plain surround, and the windows are sashes.	II
289 Apperley Road, Apperley Bridge; 53.83748°N 1.71376°W	—	c. 1820–30	A sandstone house with sill bands and a stone slate roof. There are two storeys and a symmetrical front of three bays. The central doorway has a semicircular fanlight with voussoirs and a keystone, and the windows are sashes.	II
4 Thorp Garth, Idle; 53.83327°N 1.73012°W	—	c. 1820–30	A shop on a corner site, it is in sandstone with a stone slate roof. There are three storeys, one bay on the front and two on the right gabled return. On each front is a 19th-century shop window, each with pilasters, and a cornice on console brackets. The doorways have squared jambs, the windows are mullioned with two lights, and in the gable is a round-headed window.	II
1–11 North Street, Thackley; 53.84529°N 1.73101°W	—	c. 1820–30	A row of six sandstone cottages with stone slate roofs. Nos. 5 and 7 have three storeys, and the other cottages have two. The doorways have squared jambs, some of the windows have single lights, and the others are mullioned with two or three lights.	II
25–31 Thackley Road, Thackley; 53.84463°N 1.73561°W	—	c. 1820–30	A row of four sandstone houses with paired block brackets to the eaves and a stone slate roof. There are three storeys, each house has one bay, a doorway to the right with squared jambs, and a two-light mullioned window in each floor.	II
Bottom Farmhouse; 53.84193°N 1.71770°W	—	c. 1820–30	The farmhouse is in sandstone and has a stone slate roof. There are two storeys and two bays. The doorway has squared jambs, the windows on the front are sashes, and at the rear are two-light mullioned windows.	II
12 and 14 Burnwells, Thackley; 53.84452°N 1.73861°W	—	1822	A pair of back to back houses in sandstone with a stone slate roof. There are three storeys, the doorways have squared jambs, most of the windows are mullioned with two lights, and some have been altered.	II
71, 73, and 75 Park Road, Thackley; 53.84545°N 1.73125°W	—	1824	Nos. 71 and 73 have three storeys, and No. 75 is a two-storey cottage added later. They are in sandstone with a stone slate roof, the doorways have squared jambs, and the windows are mullioned with two lights.	II
6–10 Laburnum Place, Apperley Bridge; 53.83646°N 1.70783°W	—	Early 19th century	A row of sandstone cottages with a stone slate roof. There are two storeys and each cottage has one bay. The doorways have squared jambs, and the windows are casements.	II
2 and 4 Haigh Hall, Greengates; 53.83133°N 1.71479°W	—	Early 19th century	A row of sandstone cottages with a stone slate roof and two storeys. The doorways have squared jambs, and the windows are mullioned with two lights.	II
169 and 171 New Line, Greengates; 53.83051°N 1.70918°W	—	Early 19th century	A pair of stone cottages, recessed in a row, with a stone slate roof. There are three storeys and each cottage has one bay. Some windows have single lights, some are mullioned, and the others have been altered.	II
18, 20, 20A and 22 Albion Road, Idle; 53.83465°N 1.72935°W	—	Early 19th century	A row of four cottages, two converted into shops, they are in sandstone with a stone slate roof and two storeys. The shops fronts have pilasters, and the doorways have plain surrounds. Most of the windows are mullioned, and those in No. 22 have been altered.	II
1 and 3 Ley Fleaks Road, Idle; 53.83328°N 1.73025°W	—	Early 19th century	A pair of sandstone cottages with a stone slate roof. There are two storeys and each cottage has one bay. The doorways are in the centre and have squared jambs, and the windows are mullioned with two lights.	II
42 and 44 High Street, Idle; 53.83700°N 1.73210°W	—	Early 19th century	A pair of sandstone houses with a stone slate roof. There are three storeys, each house has one bay, the doorways have plain surrounds, and the windows are mullioned casements with two lights.	II
46 and 48 High Street, Idle; 53.83695°N 1.73221°W		Early 19th century	A pair of houses, later shops, possibly refacing of earlier buildings, they are in sandstone with sill courses, bracketed gutter cornices, and stone slate roofs. They have two storeys and each shop has two bays. No. 46 has a small projecting shop front with a fretted frieze to the cornice and a blocking course, and above are two two-light mullioned windows. No. 48 to the left is higher, and has a 19th-century shop window with pilasters, to the left is a doorway with a plain surround and a flat-headed carriageway, and in the upper floor are a single-light and a two-light window.	II
The New Inn; 53.83734°N 1.73263°W		Early 19th century	The public house is in sandstone, with a moulded eaves cornice and a stone slate roof. There are two storeys and an attic, and three bays. The windows on the front are casements, and in the north gable end is a tall round-headed stair window and a round-headed attic window.	II
Holy Trinity Church, Idle; 53.83798°N 1.73143°W		1828–30	A Commissioners' church designed by John Oates in Early English style. The chancel was added in 1864 and the vestry in the late 19th century. The church is built in sandstone, and consists of a nave, a short chancel, a north vestry, and a west tower. The tower has buttresses, clock faces, and an embattled parapet with gabled pinnacles. The windows are lancets, and inside the church are galleries on three sides.	II
Coach house and stable west of 12 Laburnum Place, Apperley Bridge; 53.83631°N 1.70748°W	—	c. 1830	The former coach house and stable, which have been converted for residential use, are in sandstone and have a stone slate roof with saddlestones. There are two storeys and two bays. To the left is a doorway with squared jambs, on the right are a coach door with a loft hatch above, and between is a window in each floor.	II
13, 15 and 17 Thackley Road, Thackley; 53.84459°N 1.73470°W	—	c. 1830	A row of three sandstone cottages with a stone slate roof and two storeys. The doorways have squared jambs, some of the windows have single lights, and the others are mullioned with two lights.	II
19 and 21 Thackley Road, Thackley; 53.84460°N 1.73510°W	—	c. 1830	A pair of sandstone cottages with a stone slate roof. There are two storeys, and each cottage has one bay. The doorways are in the outer parts and have squared jambs, and the windows are mullioned with two lights.	II
Laburnum House; 53.83623°N 1.70741°W	—	c. 1830	A sandstone house with sill bands, paired dentilled eaves brackets, and a stone slate roof with saddlestones. There are two storeys and two bays. The central doorway has an architrave and a cornice on scrolled consoles, and the windows are sashes.	II
927, 929 and 931 Harrogate Road, Greengates; 53.83186°N 1.71164°W	—	c. 1830–40	No. 927 was a public house at right angles to the road, with a wing and a barn to the rear, and the building has been converted for other uses. It is in sandstone and has a stone slate roof with a saddlestone and kneelers. There are two storeys, and No. 927 has a front of three bays. Most of the windows are mullioned, and shop fronts have been inserted in the rear wing and barn, the latter in a former segmental-arched portal with voussoirs.	II
33 Thackley Road, Thackley; 53.84464°N 1.73618°W	—	c. 1830–40	A sandstone house with dentilled eaves and a stone slate roof. There are two storeys and an attic, and a front of three bays facing the road. This front contains two-light mullioned windows, with one light blocked. The entrance is in the gabled left return, The doorway has pilasters and an entablature, the windows are sashes, and there is a moulded eaves cornice.	II
159 New Line, Greengates; 53.83070°N 1.70975°W	—	Early to mid 19th century	A stone cottage with paired eaves consoles and a stone slate roof. There are two storeys, one bay, the doorway to the right has squared jambs, and the windows are mullioned with two lights.	II
379–393 Highfield Road, Idle; 53.83644°N 1.73435°W	—	Early to mid 19th century	A row of sandstone cottages with bracketed eaves and roofs of stone slate or slate. There are two storeys, each cottage has one bay, and the mullions have been removed from all the cottages apart from No. 383.	II
23 Thackley Road, Thackley; 53.84461°N 1.73532°W		Early to mid 19th century	A pair of cottages, the left cottage considerably enlarged to form a mill. They are in stone with stone slate roofs, and consist of two blocks. The right block is recessed, and has two storeys and three bays. There is one single-light window and the others are mullioned with two lights. The left block has four storeys and an attic, and two bays. On the front is a doorway with a plain surround, the ground floor windows have been altered, and in the upper floors are two-light mullioned windows.	II
Barn, Bottom Farm; 53.84223°N 1.71779°W		Early to mid 19th century	The barn, to the north of the farmhouse, is in sandstone and has a hipped slate roof. It contains segmental-arched openings and has a segmental-arched portal with voussoirs.	II
The Oddfellows; 53.83600°N 1.73164°W		1840	The public house is in rendered stone on a plinth, with quoin pilasters, a band, a parapet, and a slate roof. There are two storeys and a symmetrical front of three bays, the middle bay gabled. In the centre is a Greek Doric porch with a deep entablature and a balcony with a parapet. The windows in the outer bays are tripartite. In the south front is a doorway with a cornice on scrolled consoles.	II
161, 163 and 165 New Line, Greengates; 53.83059°N 1.70946°W		c. 1840–50	A row of three stone cottages with stone slate roofs and two storeys. No. 161 has a canted bay window to the right of the doorway and a single-light window above, and the other windows in the row are mullioned with two lights.	II
9 and 11 Thackley Road, Thackley; 53.84453°N 1.73440°W	—	c. 1850	A pair of sandstone cottages with a stone slate roof. There are two storeys, and each cottage has one bay. The doorways are in the centre and have squared jambs, and the windows are mullioned with two lights.	II
Greengates War Memorial; 53.83170°N 1.71216°W		1921	The war memorial stands in a Garden of Remembrance by crossroads. It has a stepped sandstone base, on which is a square column in white Portland stone. On top of the column is a ball and a wreath which is surmounted by a statue of a winged female figure in bronze. On the front of the column is an inscription, and on the sides are bronze plaques with the names of those lost in the First World War. The base carries another inscription and two plaques with the names of those lost in the Second World War. The garden also contains other commemorative items.	II
Telephone kiosk 53.83769°N 1.73248°W	—	1935	The telephone kiosk is by the junction of Town Lane and Westfield Lane. It is of the K6 type, designed by Giles Gilbert Scott. Constructed in cast iron with a square plan and a dome, it has unperforated crowns in the top panels.	II
