= Idle and Thackley =

Coordinates: 53.838°N 1.725°W

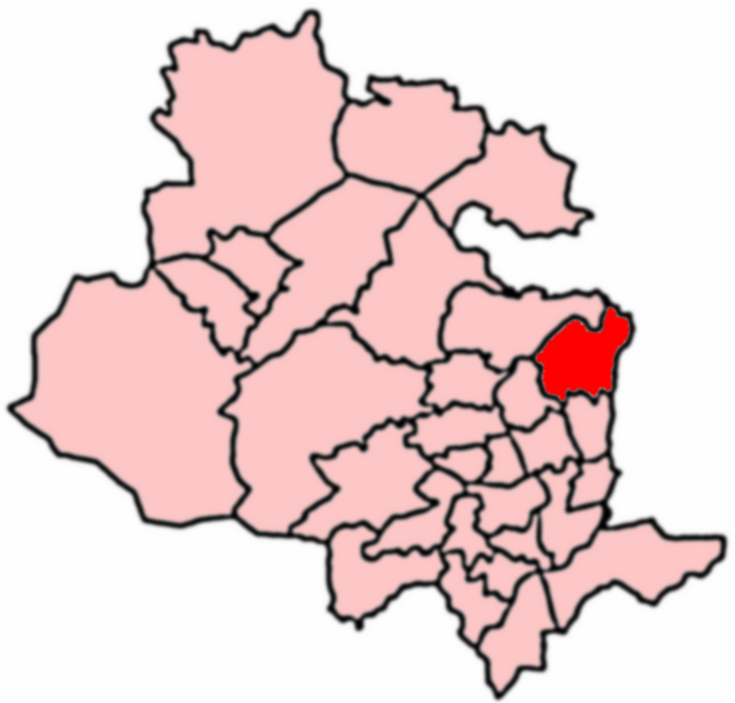
- 2004 Boundaries of Idle and Thackley Ward

- Location within West Yorkshire
- Population: 16,135 (ward. 2011)
- Metropolitan borough: City of Bradford
- Metropolitan county: West Yorkshire
- Region: Yorkshire and the Humber
- Country: England
- Sovereign state: United Kingdom
- Post town: BRADFORD
- Postcode district: BD
- UK Parliament: Bradford East
- Councillors: Dominic Fear (Liberal Democrats); Jeanette Sunderland (Liberal Democrats); Alun Griffiths (Liberal Democrats)

Idle and Thackley is a ward within the City of Bradford Metropolitan District Council in the county of West Yorkshire, England, named after the villages of Idle and Thackley around which it is drawn. The population of 14,541 according to the 2001 UK census had increased at the 2011 Census to 16,135.

As well as the villages of Idle and Thackley, the ward includes the villages of Apperley Bridge and Greengates, a small part of the Thorpe Edge housing estate, and a part of Little London near Rawdon.

== Councillors ==
Idle and Thackley electoral ward is represented on Bradford Council by three Liberal Democrat councillors, Dominic Fear, Jeanette Sunderland and Alun Griffiths.

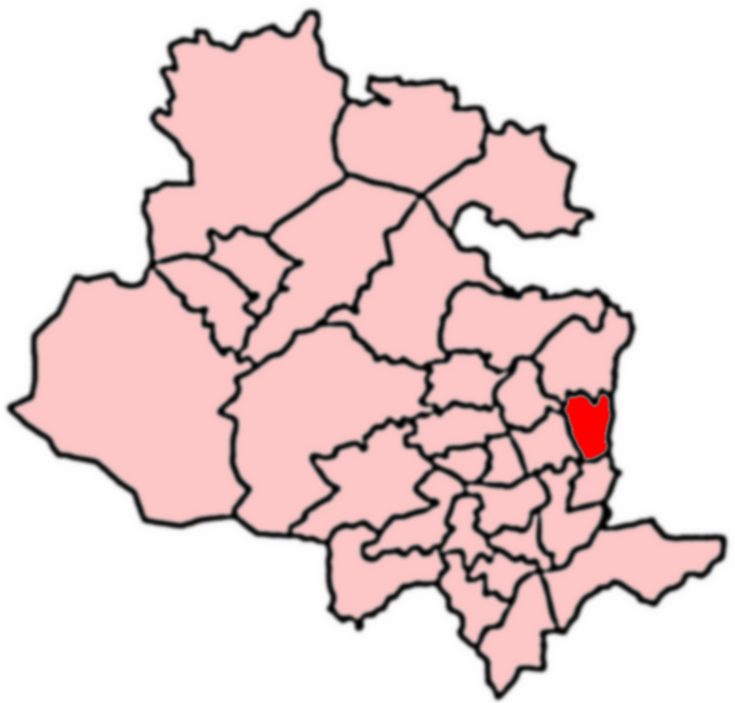
2004 Boundaries of Eccleshill Ward.

Election	Councillor	Councillor	Councillor
2004	David Ward (Lib Dem)	Jeanette Sunderland (Lib Dem)	Ann Lesley Ozolins (Lib Dem)
2006	David Ward (Lib Dem)	Jeanette Sunderland (Lib Dem)	Alun Owen Griffiths (Lib Dem)
2007	David Ward (Lib Dem)	Jeanette Sunderland (Lib Dem)	Alun Griffiths (Lib Dem)
2008	David Ward (Lib Dem)	Jeanette Sunderland (Lib Dem)	Ed Hall (Lib Dem)
2010	Chris Reid (Lib Dem)	Jeanette Sunderland (Lib Dem)	Ed Hall (Lib Dem)
2011	Chris Reid (Lib Dem)	Jeanette Sunderland (Lib Dem)	Alun Griffiths (Lib Dem)
2012	Chris Reid (Lib Dem)	Jeanette Sunderland (Lib Dem)	Alun Griffiths (Lib Dem)
2014	Dominic Fear (Lib Dem)	Jeanette Sunderland (Lib Dem)	Alun Griffiths (Lib Dem)
2015	Dominic Fear (Lib Dem)	Jeanette Sunderland (Lib Dem)	Alun Griffiths (Lib Dem)
2016	Dominic Fear (Lib Dem)	Jeanette Sunderland (Lib Dem)	Alun Griffiths (Lib Dem)

indicates seat up for re-election.

== See also ==
- Listed buildings in Idle and Thackley
