= Holy Trinity Church, Idle =

Church in Idle, West Yorkshire, England

Coordinates: 53.8380°N 1.7315°W

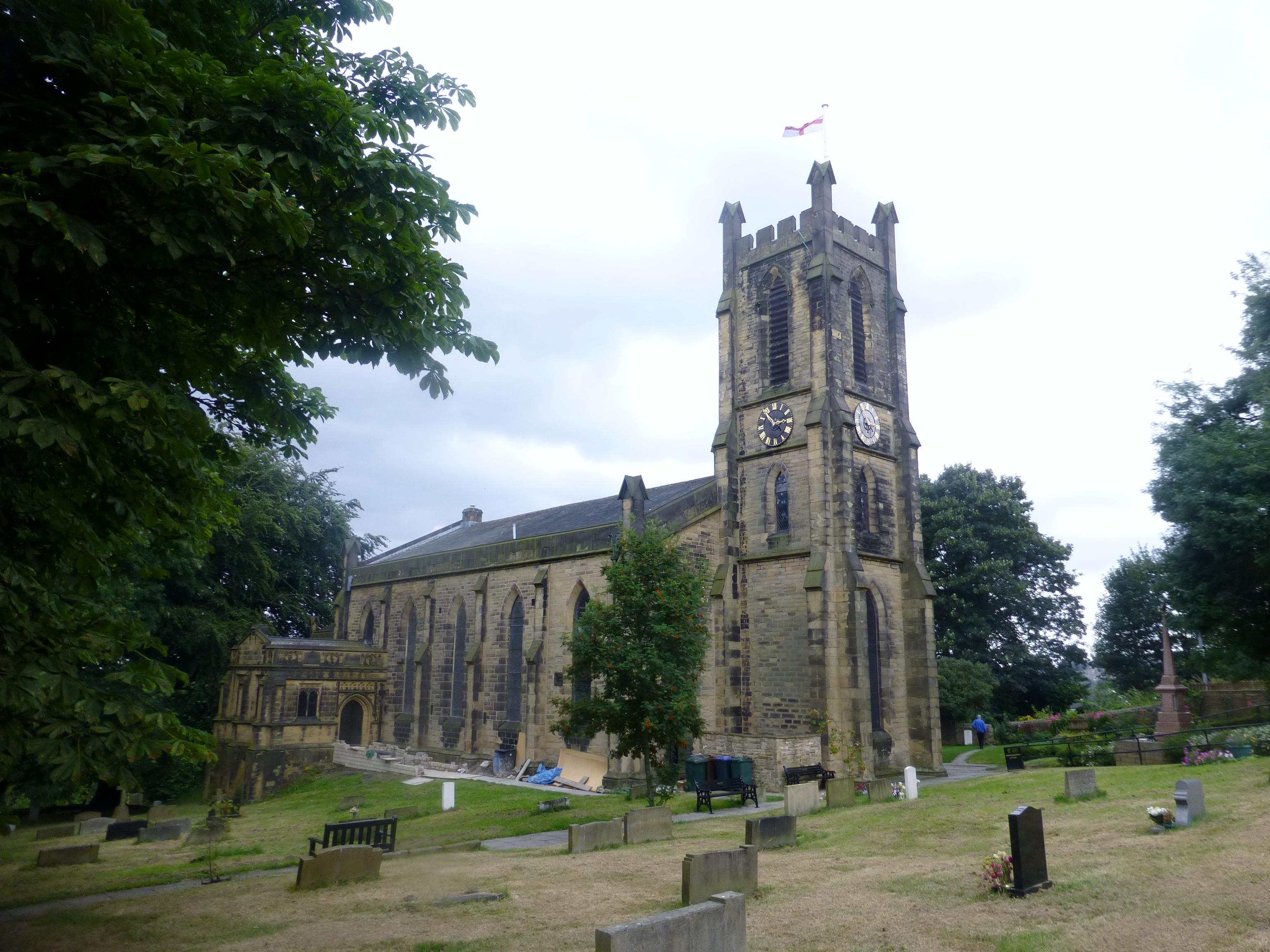
The church, in 2014

Holy Trinity Church is the parish church of Idle, West Yorkshire, a village in England.

A chapel of ease was built in Idle in 1630. In 1828, work started on a new building, on a different site, which was consecrated in 1830. It was designed by John Oates in the Early English style, and built as a Commissioners' church at a cost of £2,841 13s. A chancel was added in 1864, and a vestry later in the century. The building was grade II listed in 1983. In 2016, its east window was restored, at a cost of £40,000.

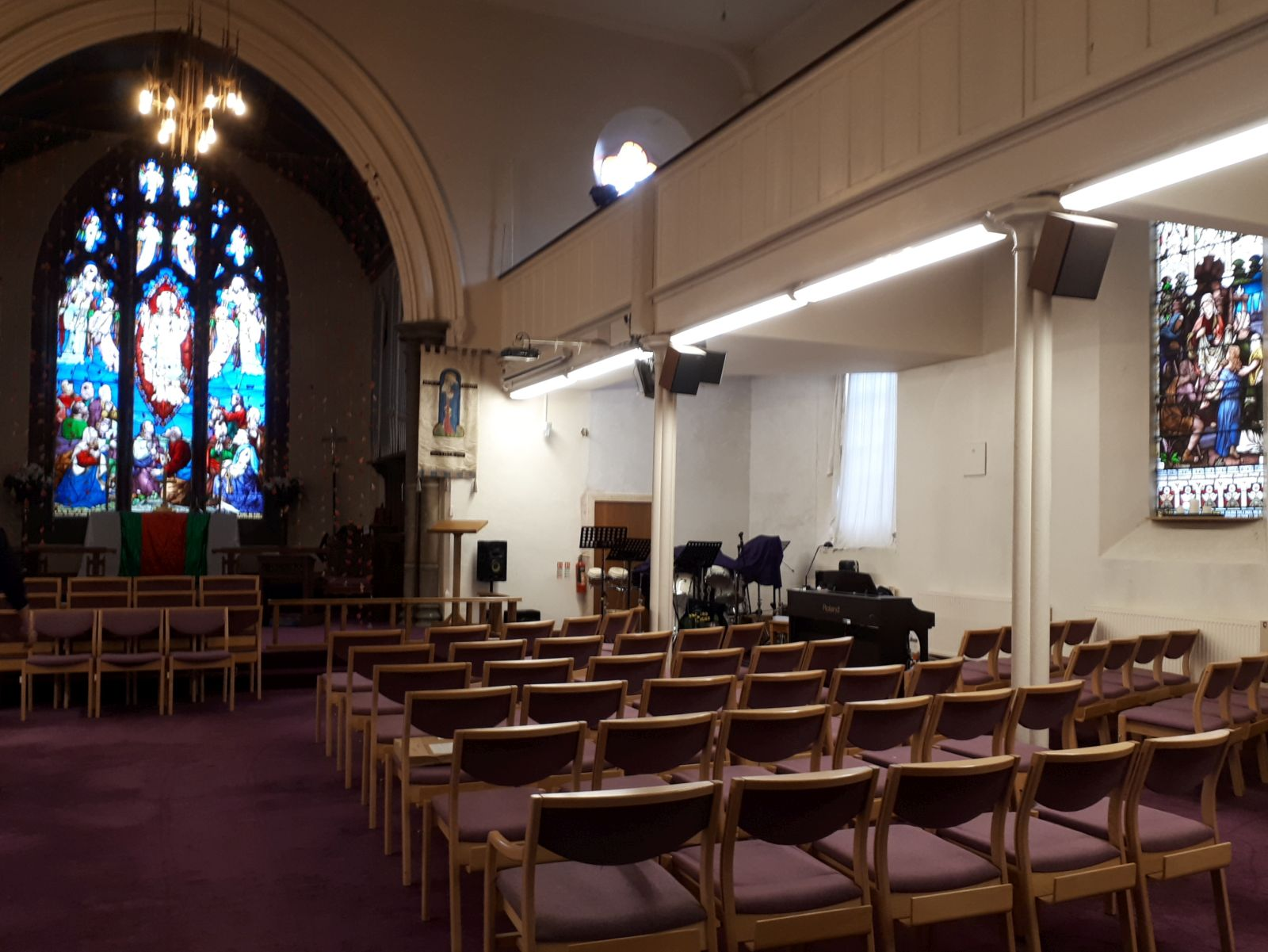
The nave and east window

The church is built of sandstone, and consists of a nave, a short chancel, a north vestry, and a west tower. The tower has buttresses, clock faces, and an embattled parapet with gabled pinnacles. The windows are lancets, and inside the church are galleries on three sides, supported by clustered iron columns.

== See also ==
- Listed buildings in Idle and Thackley
