= Idle Working Men's Club =

Working men's club in West Yorkshire, England

Coordinates: 53.8364°N 1.7320°W

The club's logo, depicting a workman leaning on a shovel

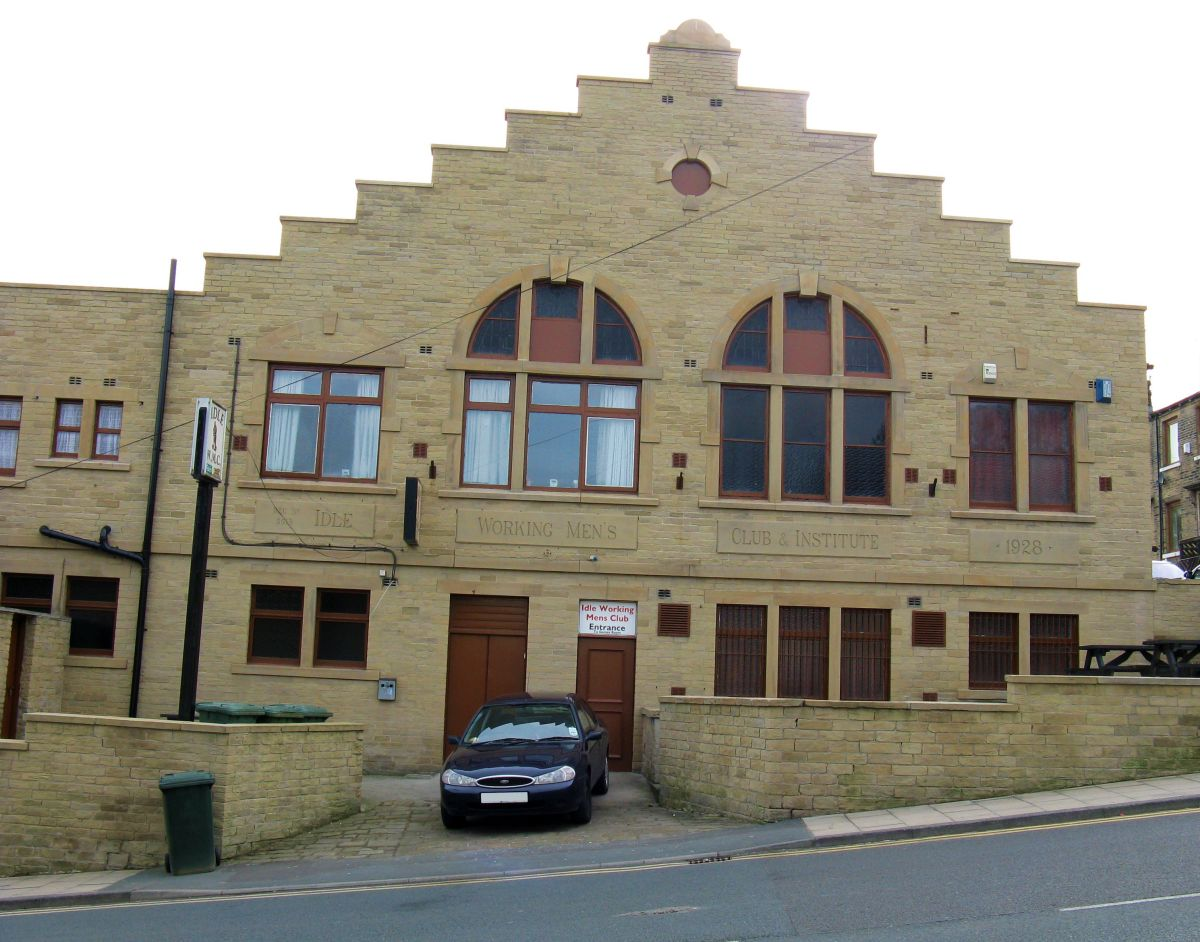
The Idle Working Men's Club

The Idle Working Men's Club is a working men's club in the village of Idle, a suburb of Bradford in West Yorkshire, England.

The club was established in 1928 by workmen from a local sewage works who found that their shift working arrangements and the pub licensing hours left them unable to have a drink after work.

The humorous pun in the club's name has attracted interest from around the world. The club has benefited by granting honorary memberships to people who would not normally fit its criteria for membership. Present honorary members include Mohammed Al Fayed, Paul Gascoigne, Uri Geller and Lester Piggott. Richard Whiteley, Michael Jackson, Tom O'Connor and Roger Moore were also honorary members.

In keeping with the tradition of many working men's clubs, Idle Working Men's Club supports a number of charities, most notably the children's cancer charity Candlelighters.
