= Listed buildings in Bradford (Eccleshill Ward) =

Eccleshill is a ward in the metropolitan borough of the City of Bradford, West Yorkshire, England. It contains 30 listed buildings that are recorded in the National Heritage List for England. All the listed buildings are designated at Grade II, the lowest of the three grades, which is applied to "buildings of national importance and special interest". The ward is to the northeast of the centre of Bradford, and contains the former village of Eccleshill and the surrounding area, including the districts of Fagley and Greengates. Most of the listed buildings are houses, cottages and associated structures, farmhouses and farm buildings. The other listed buildings consist of a former chapel, a church, and a former mechanics' institute.

== Buildings ==
Name and location	Photograph	Date	Notes
5 Beck Bottom, Greengates; 53.82795°N 1.70587°W	—	Mid to late 17th century	A house in gritstone with quoins and a stone slate roof. There are two storeys, two bays, and a single-storey outhouse range on the west. Most of the windows are mullioned, there is a large external chimney stack and an outshut porch.
153 Carr Bottom Road, Greengates; 53.82808°N 1.70615°W	—	Mid to late 17th century	A house in gritstone with quoins and a stone slate roof. There are two storeys and two bays. In the east gable end is a three-light mullioned window, and the other windows have been altered. The house has a large external chimney stack and a modern porch.
Haigh Fold; 53.81212°N 1.72285°W	—	Late 17th or early 18th century	A farmhouse that was extended and converted into a group of two-storey cottages in the later 18th century. They are in sandstone with quoins, and stone slate roofs with a saddlestone and shaped kneelers. The doorways have squared jambs, the windows are mullioned, some mullions have been removed, and in the gable end is a vertical bull's eye window.
1–15 Ashfield Place, Fagley; 53.80869°N 1.71933°W		1754	A terrace of cottages dating from 1800 to 1820 incorporating an older farmhouse. They are in sandstone with quoins, and stone slate roofs that have a gable end with a saddlestone and kneelers. Most of the windows are mullioned with two or three lights, and there are some single-light windows.
Cherry Tree Farmhouse and barn 53.81279°N 1.71418°W	—	1754	The barn was altered or added to the farmhouse in the early 19th century. The buildings are in sandstone with quoins and a stone slate roof. There are two storeys and a rear outshut. The doorway in the house has squared jambs, above it is a single-light window, the other windows are mullioned with two lights, and under the eaves is a datestone. The barn has a segmental archway.
Throstle Nest Farmhouse and barn 53.81348°N 1.71662°W	—	Mid to late 18th century	The farmhouse and barn are in sandstone with quoins, and a stone slate roof with saddlestones and kneelers. The house has two storeys, three bays, and a rear outshut. The central doorway has squared jambs, and the windows are sashes. The barn is at right angles, and contains a segmental arched entry.
3 Moorside Road, Eccleshill; 53.81959°N 1.72684°W	—	Late 18th century	A sandstone house with quoins, and a stone slate roof with saddlestones and coped kneelers. There are two storeys and three bays. The doorway has squared jambs, above it is a single-light window, and the other windows are mullioned with two lights.
223, 225 and 227 Moorside Road, Eccleshill; 53.81208°N 1.72307°W	—	Late 18th century	A row of three sandstone cottages with quoins and stone slate roofs. There are two storeys, the doorways have squared jambs, and the windows are mullioned with some mullions removed.
229 and 231 Moorside Road, Eccleshill; 53.81193°N 1.72297°W	—	Late 18th century	A pair of sandstone cottages with quoins and stone slate roofs. There are two storeys, the doorways have squared jambs, the windows in the upper floor are mullioned with three lights, and the ground floor windows have been altered.
9 Stony Lane, Eccleshill; 53.82079°N 1.72631°W	—	Late 18th century	A sandstone house, later a shop, with quoins, sill bands, and a stone slate roof. There are two storeys and three bays. The central doorway has squared jambs, and a projecting shop front has been added to the right of it. The window above it has a single light, and the other windows are mullioned with two lights.
27–39 Stony Lane, Eccleshill; 53.82108°N 1.72518°W		Late 18th century	A row of cottages, including a shop and a public house, the Royal Oak. They are in sandstone with quoins, stone slate roofs, and two storeys. The doorways have squared jambs, and the windows are mullioned with two or three lights.
Ravenscliff Farmhouse and barn 53.81171°N 1.70944°W	—	Late 18th century	The farmhouse and barn are in sandstone with quoins, and a stone slate roof with kneelers on the gable ends. The house has two storeys, a doorway with squared jambs, and mullioned windows with two or three lights. There is a small outhouse at right angles to the west, and a barn to the east.
3A Lands Lane, Eccleshill; 53.82366°N 1.72484°W		c. 1800	A chapel converted for residential use, it is in sandstone with quoins, and a stone slate roof with saddlestones and shaped kneelers. There are two storeys and four bays. In the middle two bays are full-height round-arched sash windows with voussoirs and imposts. The outer bays each contains a doorway with squared jambs in the ground floor and a square sash window above.
2 and 4 Moorside Road, Eccleshill; 53.82030°N 1.72719°W		c. 1800	A pair of sandstone cottages that have stone slate roofs with saddlestones. The doorways have squared jambs, and the windows are mullioned with two or three lights.
702 and 704 Harrogate Road, Greengates; 53.82792°N 1.71435°W	—	Late 18th or early 19th century	A building that was converted into two houses in about 1840–50, it is in sandstone, with bracketed eaves and a stone slate roof. The doorways have pilasters and cornices, in the ground floor there are three canted bay windows, the upper floor contains single-light and two-light mullioned windows, and at the rear is a tall round-arched stair window.
Coach house and stable east of 702 and 704 Harrogate Road; 53.82789°N 1.71396°W	—	Late 18th or early 19th century	The coach house and stable have been converted for residential use. The building is in stone with a stone slate roof, and on the roof is a pinnacled ventilator.
28 and 30 Back Stone Hall Road, Eccleshill; 53.81926°N 1.72947°W	—	c. 1800–20	A pair of sandstone houses with a stone slate roof. There are three storeys, and the windows are mullioned with two lights.
78 and 80 Stone Hall Road, Eccleshill; 53.82005°N 1.72748°W	—	c. 1800–20	A pair of sandstone houses with stone slate roofs. There are three storeys at the front and two at the rear. The doorways have squared jambs, and the windows are mullioned with three lights.
6–10 Moorside Road and barn, Eccleshill; 53.82014°N 1.72721°W		c. 1800–30	A row of sandstone houses with sill bands, paired eaves brackets, and a stone slate roof. There are three storeys, and each house has a doorway with squared jambs, and three-light mullioned windows. At right angles to the rear of No. 10 is a workshop or barn at right angles. This has three storeys and an attic, and a pedimented gable front containing a round attic window and pigeon holes. In the upper floor is a three-light mullioned window, above which is a range of round-headed ventilation slits.
Old Stone Hall; 53.81993°N 1.72751°W	—	1801	The house, which was later extended with a cottage to the left, is in sandstone with chamfered quoins, a sill band, a moulded eaves cornice on modillion brackets, and a stone slate roof. There are two storeys, the main block has a symmetrical front of three bays, and the cottage has two bays. The doorway has squared jambs and a cornice, the mullioned windows have been replaced by casements, below the central window is a date plaque, and in the rear of the cottage some millions remain.
73, 75, and 77 Stone Hall Road, Eccleshill; 53.82012°N 1.72812°W	—	1816	A row of three sandstone cottages with sill bands and stone slate roofs. There are two storeys, the doorways have squared jambs, some windows have single lights, and the others are mullioned with two lights.
31 Moorside Road, Eccleshill; 53.81849°N 1.72641°W		1817	A sandstone house with a sill band, paired eaves brackets, and a stone slate roof with saddlestones. There are two storeys and a symmetrical front of three bays. Above the central doorway is a date plaque with a cornice, and over that is a single-light window. The other windows are mullioned with two lights.
155 Moorside Road, Eccleshill; 53.81373°N 1.72363°W	—	c. 1830	A sandstone house that has a stone slate roof with saddlestones. There are two storeys and three bays. The central doorway has squared jambs, the window above it has a single light, and the other windows have two lights and mullions.
1–23 Moorwell Place, Eccleshill; 53.81834°N 1.72714°W		c. 1830	A terrace of houses, originally back to back, in sandstone with stone slate roofs. There are three storeys, and each house has two bays. The doorways have squared jambs, and the windows are mullioned with two lights.
Manor House; 53.81645°N 1.72954°W	—	c. 1830	The house, which incorporates earlier material as a rear wing, is in sandstone, and has a hipped stone slate roof. There are two storeys and a symmetrical front of three bays. The doorway has a moulded cornice on console brackets, the windows are sashes, and in the south return is a bow window.
14 Moorside Road, Eccleshill; 53.81992°N 1.72728°W	—	c. 1850–60	A sandstone house with a sill band, flat boxed eaves on console brackets and a hipped roof. There are two storeys and a symmetrical front of three bays. The central doorway has engaged Doric columns and an entablature.
Greengates Liberal Club; 53.83043°N 1.70904°W		c. 1850–60	The building is in sandstone with a sill band, and a stone slate roof with saddlestones and kneelers. There are two storeys and five bays. In the upper floor are round-arched casement windows and an ornate cast iron balcony. The ground floor contains a doorway with a moulded cornice, and the windows have flat heads.
Ukrainian Autocephalic Orthodox Church; 53.82105°N 1.72407°W		1854–55	Originally a Methodist chapel, it is in sandstone on a plinth, with an impost and sill courses, and is in Italianate style. There are two storeys, a basement on the south, and sides of six bays. On the front is a pediment, a bracketed moulded cornice, and quoin pilasters. The central porch has Doric piers, a deep entablature and a blocking course, and the doorway has a semicircular fanlight. The flanking windows have flat lintels, and in the upper floor are five round-arched windows with voussoirs.
82 Stone Hall Road, Eccleshill; 53.82015°N 1.72736°W	—	1859	A sandstone house with block eaves brackets and a stone slate roof. There are two storeys and a symmetrical front of three bays. The central doorway has pilasters and a cornice, the window above it has a single light, and the other windows are mullioned with two lights.
Mechanics Institute; 53.82065°N 1.72722°W		1868	The mechanics' institute, later a community century, is in sandstone, and has two storeys and a pedimented front of three bays. The outer bays contain doorways with segmental-arched fanlights, pilasters, and cornices, and between them is a tripartite window with a cornice. In the upper floor are round-arched windows, the middle window tripartite, with keystones and an impost band. The pediment has a finial, and in the tympanum is an inscription and the date. Along the sides are round-arched windows.
