= Greengates =

Area in Bradford, England

Coordinates: 53.831428°N 1.712172°W

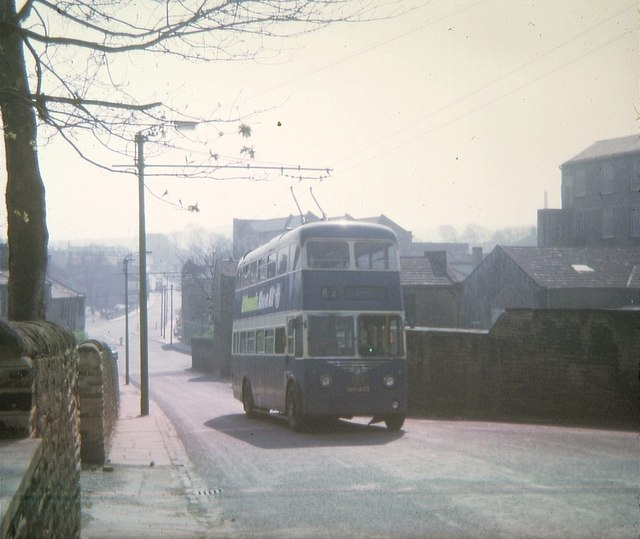
- A Bradford trolley bus on Albion Road

- Location within West Yorkshire
- OS grid reference: SE1837
- Metropolitan borough: City of Bradford
- Metropolitan county: West Yorkshire
- Region: Yorkshire and the Humber
- Country: England
- Sovereign state: United Kingdom
- Post town: BRADFORD
- Postcode district: BD10
- Dialling code: 01274
- Police: West Yorkshire
- Fire: West Yorkshire
- Ambulance: Yorkshire

Greengates is a small suburban area in the north-east of the city of Bradford, West Yorkshire, in England. The area is bordered by Idle and Thackley to the north-west, whilst Thorpe Edge is to the west. To the south of Greengates is Ravenscliffe with the village of Eccleshill beyond that. Apperley Bridge is to the north. East of Greengates, in the Leeds Metropolitan District, is the village of Calverley.

== History ==
To the west of Greengates is Albion Mills, a historic textile mill, destroyed by fire on 10 March 1911 but rebuilt. In 1931 the Bradford trolleybus routes were extended from Idle to Greengates, with the service running along Albion Road and Leeds Road.

In 1928 a purpose-built 595 seat cinema 'Greengates Cinema' was constructed on New Line for the Greengates Cinema Company. This closed in 1959 and is now an Asda supermarket.

== Governance ==
Greengates is situated largely in the Idle and Thackley ward and partly in the Eccleshill ward. It is represented as part of the parliamentary constituency of Bradford East.

== Economy ==
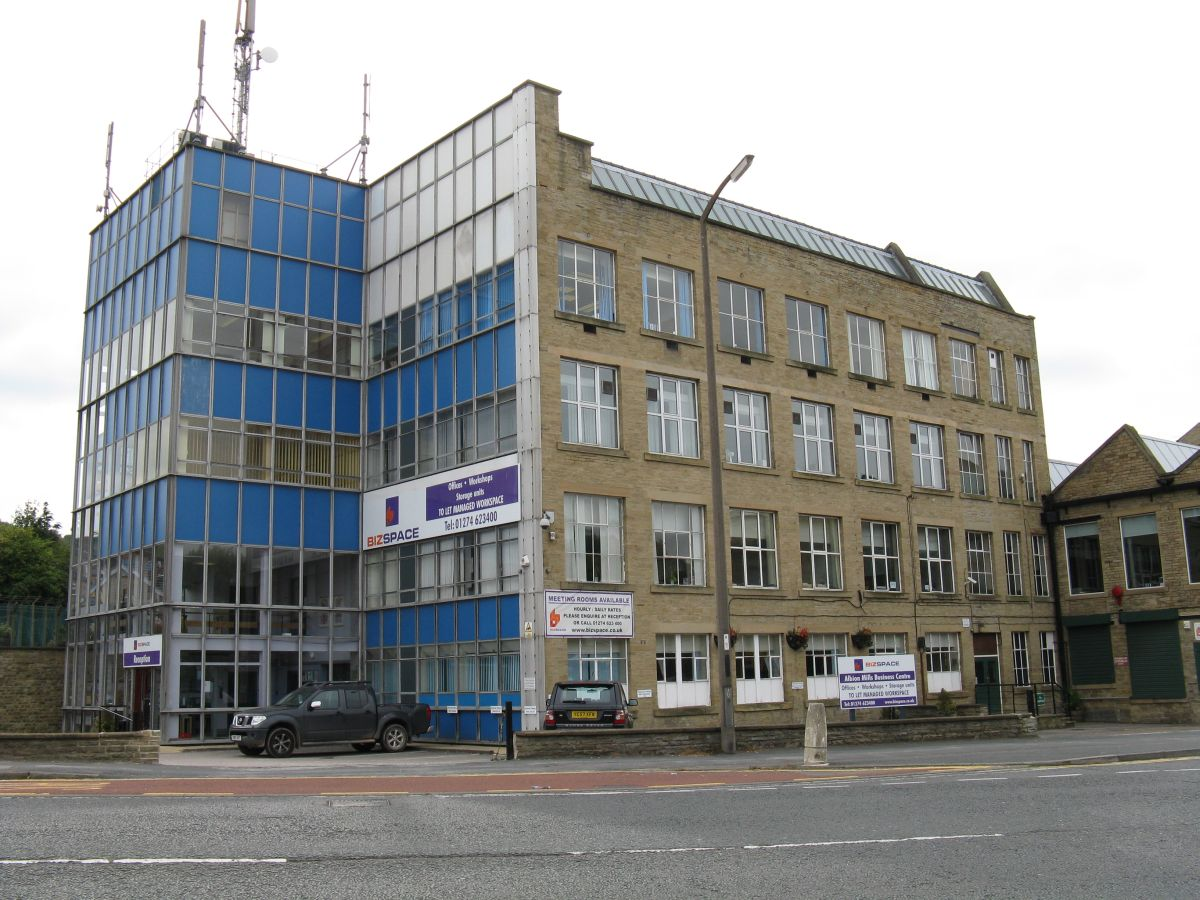
Part of Albion Mills Business Centre

Greengates' proximity to the Leeds and Liverpool Canal, which runs through Apperley Bridge to the north of the village, has meant that Greengates has several mills. At the western end is Robin Mills and Albion Mills. Robin Mills was a base for manufacturing knitting wool yarns but is now split into industrial units. A large part of Robin Mills is occupied by Storey Evans, carton, leaflet, label etc. printers for the pharmaceutical industry. Albion Mills is split into office accommodation and business units. There is the racing car themed Speedmaster Conference Centre, until recently notable for its classic, competition and racing car showroom and exhibition. The centre was opened in April 2008 by Sir Stirling Moss.

The large cenotaph war memorial situated at the crossroads, which commemorates those who died in World War I and World War II from Greengates and the surrounding villages.

On Harrogate Road to the north of the main crossroads there is a large Anglican church dedicated to St. John the Evangelist. Along this stretch of the Harrogate Road is Optegra Yorkshire Eye Hospital and Bettersight Advanced Eye and Vision Consultancy.

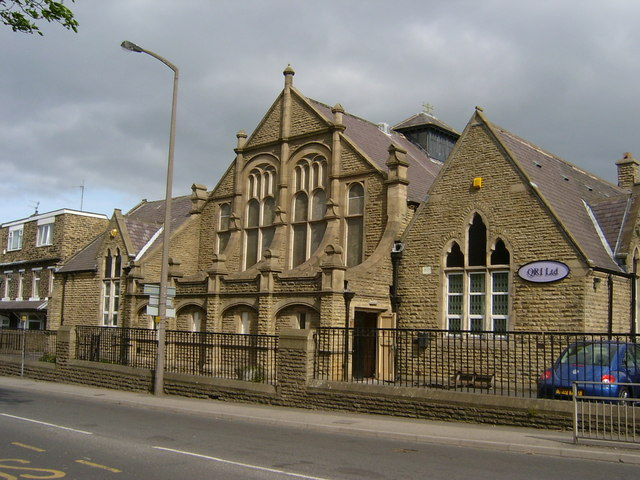
Old village school, New Line

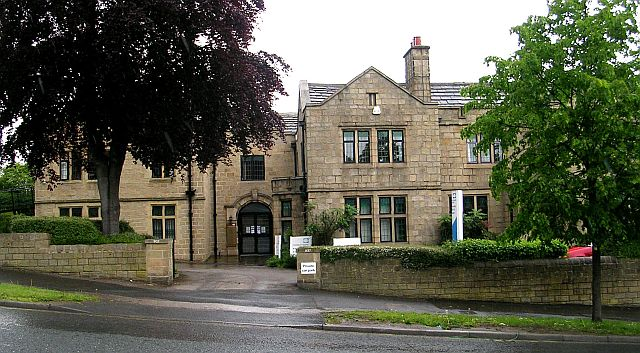
Optegra Yorkshire Eye Hospital, Harrogate Road

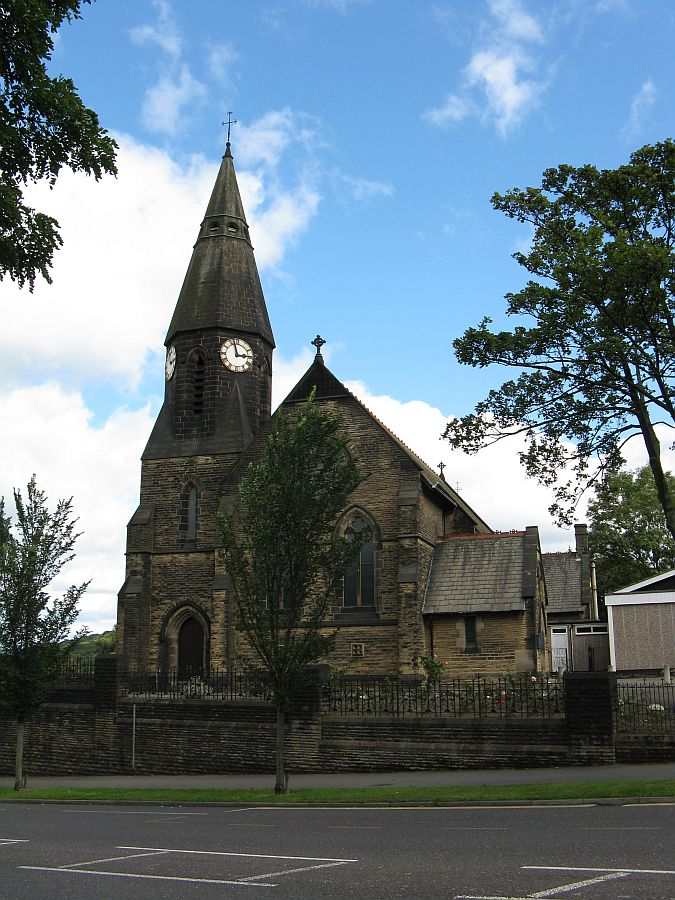
Church of St. John the Evangelist, Harrogate Road

There are a number of listed buildings in Greengates. These are to be found at Beck Bottom, Carr Bottom Road, Haigh Hall, Harrogate Road, New Line and Stockhill Fold.

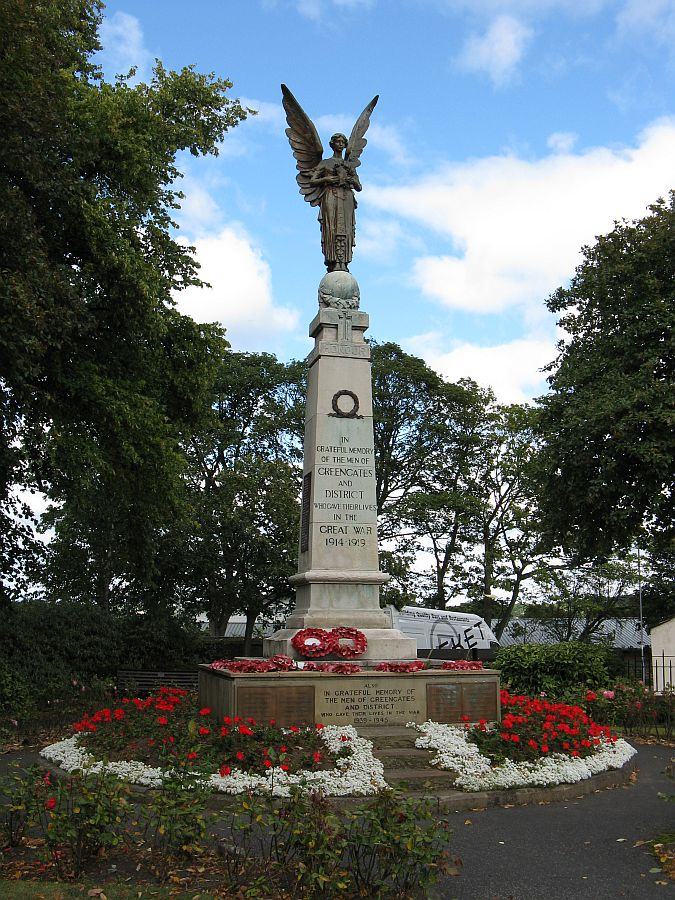
Greengates War Memorial^{*}

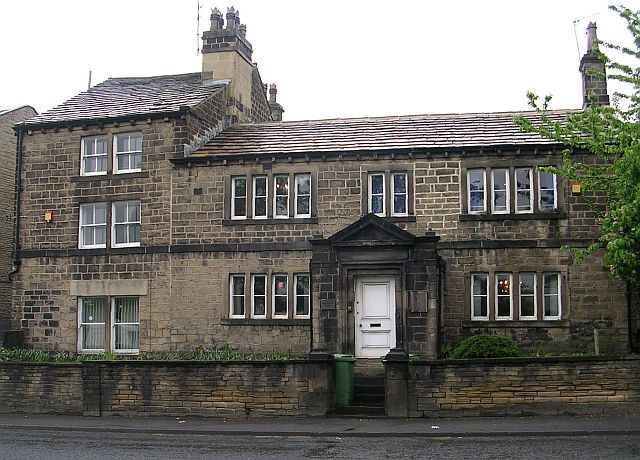
Greengates House,^{*} Harrogate Road

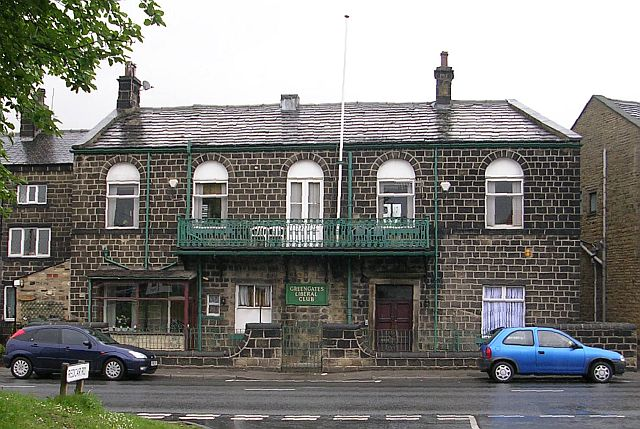
The Liberal Club,^{*} New Line

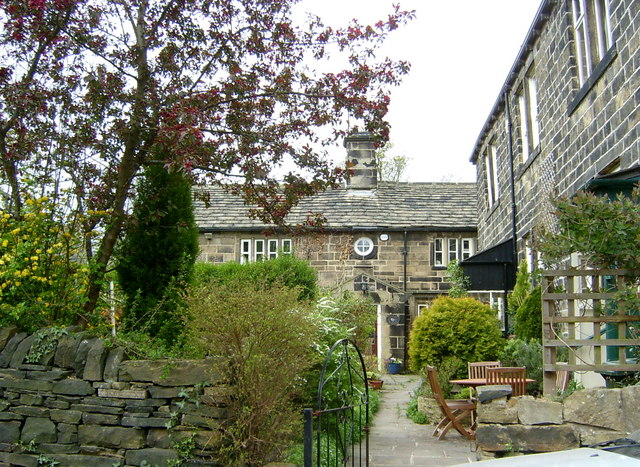
Haigh Hall^{*}

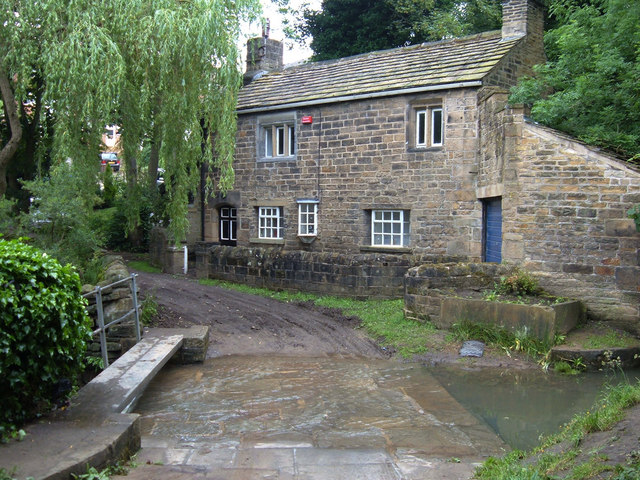
Listed building at Beck Foot^{*}
^{*} listed buildings

== Education ==
Greengates has its own primary school, Greengates Primary School, that moved northwards out of an older building on Leeds Road, to a new building across the road. The old school building has now been transformed into fashion business premises. Parkland Primary School, immediately behind Albion Mills, also serves Greengates and the neighbouring Thorpe Edge estate.

== Transport ==
The following bus services run to Greengates:

- 645: (First Bradford) Buttershaw – Greengates via Five Lane Ends and Bradford City Centre,
- 60: (Keighley Bus Company) Leeds – Keighley via Bingley and Saltaire,
- 747: (Flying Tiger) [Airport Direct] Bradford – Leeds Bradford Airport – Harrogate.

The A657 Leeds Road / New Line runs east–west through Greengates while the A658 Harrogate Road runs approximately north–south. Greengates does not have its own railway station: the nearest station is Apperley Bridge railway station, just under a mile to the north. The nearest airport to Greengates is Leeds Bradford Airport, which can be accessed by bus service 747.

== Notable people ==
- Albert Cordingley (1871–1939), first-class cricketer

== See also ==
- Listed buildings in Idle and Thackley
- Listed buildings in Bradford (Eccleshill Ward)
