= Idle, West Yorkshire =

Area of Bradford in West Yorkshire, England

Coordinates: 53.84°N 1.73°W

Idle
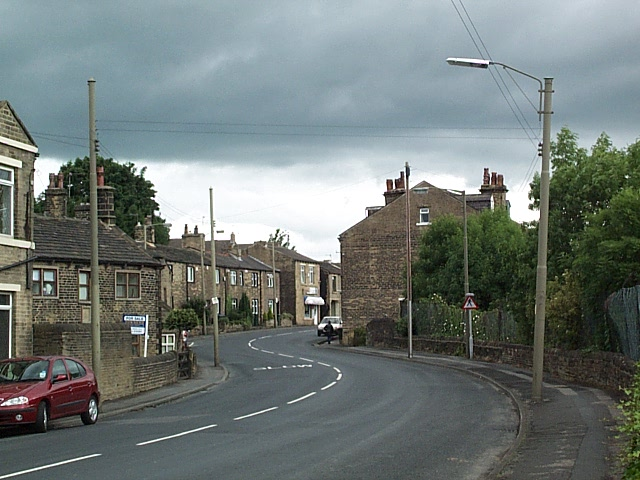
- Highfield Road, Idle

- Location within West Yorkshire
- OS grid reference: SE178383
- Metropolitan borough: City of Bradford
- Metropolitan county: West Yorkshire
- Region: Yorkshire and the Humber
- Country: England
- Sovereign state: United Kingdom
- Post town: BRADFORD
- Postcode district: BD10
- Dialling code: 01274
- Police: West Yorkshire
- Fire: West Yorkshire
- Ambulance: Yorkshire

Idle is a residential suburban area in the city of Bradford, West Yorkshire, in the north-east of the city. Historically it was a separate village, and before that it was the Manor of Idle.

Idle is about 5 miles (8 km) north of the centre of Bradford and 2.5 miles (4 km) east of Shipley. It is loosely bordered by the areas of Eccleshill, Wrose, Thackley, Apperley Bridge, and Greengates, and also bordered to the north by the River Aire along with the Leeds-Liverpool canal. At the 2021 census, the area of Idle & Thackley had a total population of 17,290 people.

The etymology of Idle can be traced back to the Old English word for "Idel", meaning "Empty Space". A myth perpetuates that the etymology of Idle belongs to that of "Idlawe" or "Ide's Hill", referring to an Anglo-Saxon settler called "Ide", however, this is not widely accepted due to a lack of historical evidence.

Industry in Idle, according to the 2021 census, consists of retail and wholesale (14.5%), human health and social work activities (14.5%) and education (11.6%) for people living in Idle.

Historically, the village achieved some economic success and experienced high population growth during the 19th century due to advances in industrialisation which influenced the widespread textile industry of 19th century Bradford which was also prevalent within the village, evidenced by remnant mills contained within the village to the modern day. The village also had a successful quarrying industry along Idle Moor, a geographical moorland where the modern Idle area is located.

== History ==
Evidence of human occupation within Idle can be traced as far back as Prehistoric & Roman times. Roman coins were historically unearthed by quarrymen setting up business at Catstones Quarry located on Idle moor in the 19th century. No permanent Roman settlement has been unearthed, with no plans for excavation near the old Idle Moor quarry sites. Other archaeological finds have been found dating to the 1st and 2nd centuries of various brooches and coins again at Catstones Quarry.

Some prehistoric flints found on alluvium deposits of the River Aire have also highlighted even earlier human activity in the region. This suggests early human activity could have occurred around the area of Idle as evidenced by historical findings from the broader Yorkshire area.

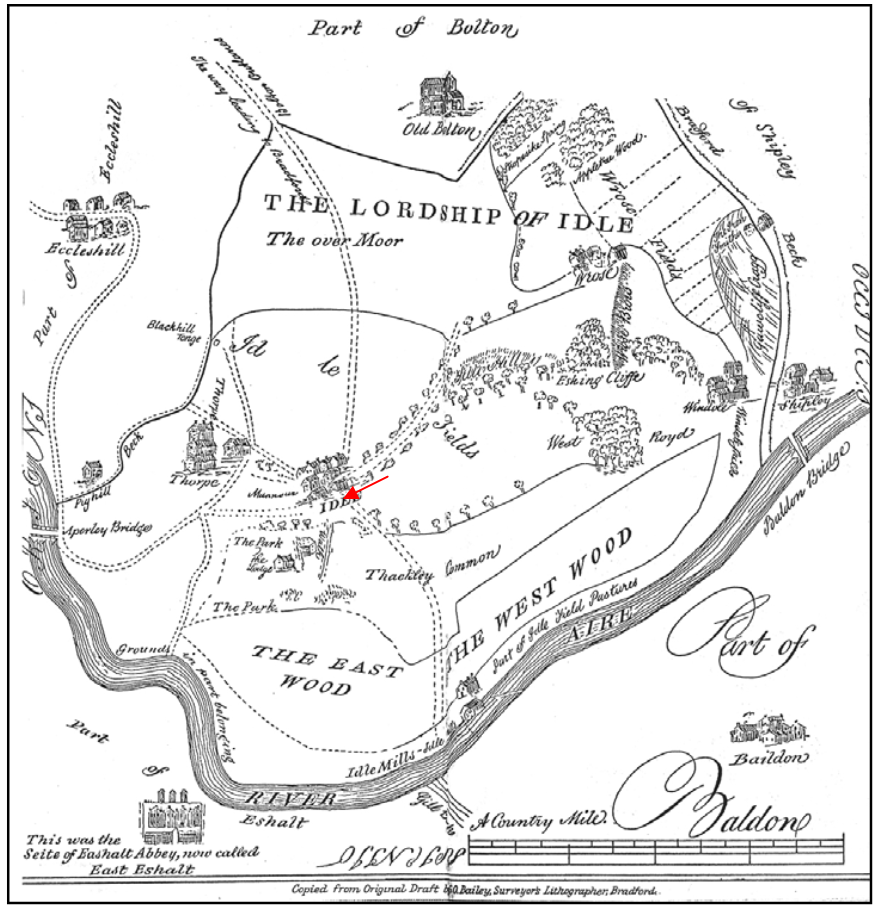
Annotated Map of the Lordship of Idle, 1584.

The first documented record of human settlement in Idle is from the 12th century, where Nigel de Plumpton, a local landowner, gave a portion of land to nuns living in Esholt. This land was referred to as "Idel" as opposed to "Idle" – referring to an Old English word for "Empty Space". The family of Plumpton were among the first landowners of the area of Idle, known as the Manor of Idle. By the 15th century, the Plumpton landowner family had reduced in wealth and power, thus, the manor was split with the succussive landowners being named as George, Earl of Cumberland & Sir John Constable, the latter splitting the manor further between his children.

The Manor of Idle contained the villages of Idle and Windhill and hamlets of Thackley, Thorpe-Green, Parkhill, Cross-Keys, Buckmill, and Wrose. The Manor of Idle was bounded by the River Aire in the north and in the east Pighill Beck (now named Haigh Beck) up to Blakehill Tongue and across westwards down a small beck to Bradford Beck. The name is thought to be a corruption of Idlawe meaning Ide's Hill, where Ida is supposed to be an Anglo Saxon settler. Thorpe middle school is in the centre of the village.

During the 19th century, Idle & the rest of Bradford had a predominantly textile industry, however, Idle also had a large quarrying industry, with Idle stone being exported across England as well as foreign exports as far as China, Australia & South America. An 1893 land survey showed mills including Castle Mills, Union Mill & New Mills employing around 1100 people, among other mills around Idle during the 19th century.

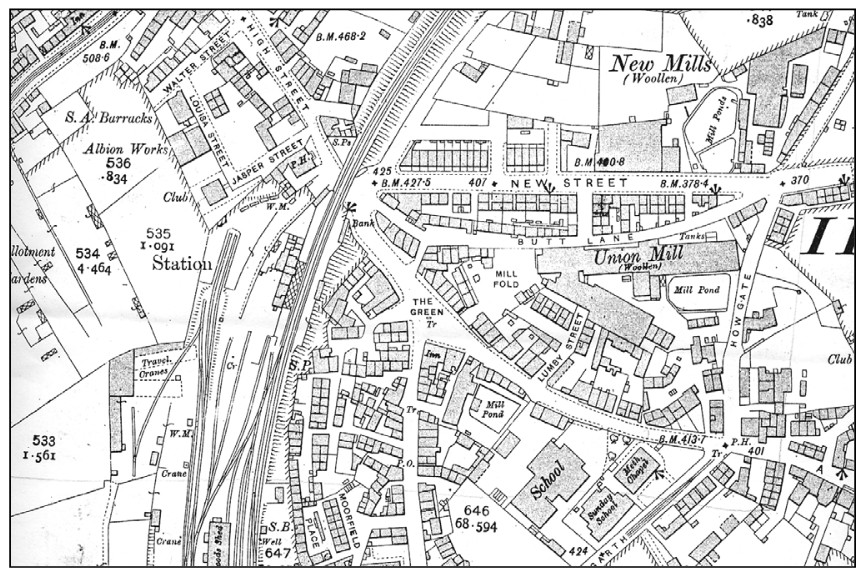
Survey of Idle, 1908

Because of the industrial success of Idle & the rest of Bradford, Idle had a large population increase from the start of the 19th century to the end of the 19th century, with the population recorded as being 3,400 in 1801 to over 12,000 by 1871.

=== Church history ===
Idle was once part of the parish of Calverley but in 1584 a chapel of ease was built on Town Lane and later in 1630 rebuilt on the same site. The building is now known as Old Chapel. A school was added to the western end of Old Chapel and later in 1836 was rebuilt as Round Steps School. The school building also contained a lockup and the town's offices, and was also used by the Mechanics Institute. It was demolished in the late 19th century. In 1914 there was a move to demolish Old Chapel to widen the road to improve access however there was a successful campaign to oppose this and preserve the Old Chapel.

In 1717 Upper Chapel was built on Westfield Road by dissenters, rebuilt in 1790 and rebuilt again in 1850. This was demolished in 1953 and rebuilt again becoming the United Reformed Church in 1972. The Primitive Methodist Church was established on Town Lane in 1861. Later the property was used by the Idle branch of the YMCA but was demolished later and housing built on the site.

Thorpe Methodist Chapel was built in 1814 and a new chapel built in 1871 then demolished circa 1981 and a modern chapel built on the site. Holy Trinity Church, Idle was built off Town Lane in 1830 and later the graveyard was extended into land between the church and The Grange previously occupied by Church Farm. In 1858 the Unitarian Church was built on Highfield Road but was later demolished. St John's Church was built on Cavendish Road but this has now been demolished. The Idle Baptist Chapel was built on Bradford Road in 1810 and the Idle Baptist Church was built in 1875 but was demolished in 1983.

The Salvation Army came to Idle in 1884 and took up residence in the Old Green Mill in Idle Green. In 1890 the foundations were laid for the present Idle Citadel Salvation Army Worship Hall on Walter Street: the builders were Messrs Obank & sons of Thackley. The hall was opened in April 1893. In 1999 a new community hall was built adjoining the main hall over the site of the old air-raid shelter. The Idle Spiritualist Church was established on Highfield Road in the former premises of the White Hart Inn.

=== Industrial and transport history ===
Idle's early local industry was based on coal measures and quarrying. Stone was exported using the canal and later on the railway. Mills in the Idle area include Old Green Mill, Butt Lane Cotton Mill, Union Mills, Simpson Green Mill or Castle Mill, New Mill and Albion Mill. Idle was served at different periods by two railway stations firstly the Idle (L&BR) railway station in Thackley on the Leeds and Bradford line during 1847-48, and then the Idle railway station in central Idle on the Great Northern Laisterdyke—Shipley line between 1875 and 1968. The railway opened to goods in 1874 and to passengers in 1875. Services to Idle, Thackley, Eccleshill and Shipley & Windhill were given a notice of withdrawal on 2 February 1931. Freight continued to be transported along this route until it too was given a notice of closure on 31 October 1964. Remnants of the railway can be found across the Idle area, with heavily eroded, nature-reclaimed trackbeds being located across the original route of the railway. Idle's workhouse was on Windhill Old Road in Thackley. Watmough's printers was founded in 1888 and had premises on High Street. The business closed and the buildings demolished to make way for housing. A tram service operated from Bradford to Thorpe Garth from 1901 to 1931 after which a trolley bus service started.

Jowett Cars Ltd had a car factory in Bradford Road, Idle until 1954. Jowett then sold the factory to International Harvester who made tractors at the site until the early 1980s. The factory was demolished after International Harvester closed it, and the site is now occupied by Enterprise 5, a retail complex largely consisting of independent units, McDonald's and a Morrisons supermarket. Rank Leak Wharfedale had a site on Highfield Road manufacturing Hi-Fi equipment. The Idle Picture Palace (cinema) opened in 1912 located in existing buildings on The Green. Circa 1930 sound was installed and in 1955 a wide screen, but it closed in 1959 to reopen as a Bingo hall but the building was demolished in 1970/71. In more modern times there was a Hillards Supermarket off Idlecroft which later became Dunnes Stores. The premises remained unoccupied after Dunnes closed in 2015. The site has been developed and is now split between Home Bargains and Aldi.

== Geography ==
The borders between the village and its neighbouring areas are not particularly well defined, but there are three distinct areas in the village: the mainly working class area of Thorpe Edge to the south east of the village; the middle class area, centred on the main roads of Highfield Road and Town Lane, west of the village; and the middle class area centred on the main road of Leeds Road, east of the village. To the extreme west of the village, immediately on the border with the area of Wrose, is the mostly rural Idle Moor. This is a particularly hilly area of the village and provides views over the River Aire valley towards Shipley and Baildon.

The village centre consists of a small village green, around which are various shops, banks, a pubs and eateries. In the area leading away from the village centre towards Leeds Road, there is a recreational area including football fields, tennis courts, a bowling green and a children's play area. This is known locally as the Idle Rec. Idle and The Green is a conservation area.

== Governance ==
Idle was a township and chapelry in the ancient parish of Calverley in the West Riding of Yorkshire. In 1866 it became a separate civil parish, and in 1894 briefly an urban district, but in 1899 it was included in Bradford when it became a city. In 1951 the parish had a population of 10,516. Today the village is located in the ward of Idle and Thackley. The village is also located in the newly created parliamentary constituency of Bradford East, a successor seat to the Bradford North constituency which was originally created for the 1918 general election, with the new Bradford East seat being created in 2010 with minor changes proposed in 2023 for the 2024 general election.

Idle has historically not had an official twin town or village, however, Shipley historically made twin town associations with the German town of Hamm during the 1970s, with representatives from Hamm visiting Idle, Shipley & the rest of Bradford in the during the 1970s & 1980s. There are currently no plans to officiate a sister or twin village for Idle.

== Landmarks ==
Leading down to the village from Highfield Road is the main High Street, with businesses and pubs, a medical centre and dental practice.

On the High Street is the 'Idle Working Men's Club' built in 1928. To outsiders this is perhaps the best known feature of the village, as when read out the name erroneously implies that the club provides a place for 'idle' or lazy working men to drink, rather than simply being a working men's club in the village of Idle. The unique name has acquired the club a cult status around the world, with many clamouring for an official 'Idle Working Men's Pass'. The membership exceeds 1,000, a large number considering the decline of similar working men's clubs throughout the north of England. Women were allowed to become members in 1995. There are over a dozen public houses and bars in Idle. The Post Office is on Bradford Road and West Yorkshire Police's Eccleshill Police Station is in Idle. On Leeds Road is the Bradford branch of the British Red Cross. Idle's War Memorial in the lytch gate of the Holy Trinity Church in Town Lane memorialises the 215 men who died in both world wars.

Many of the houses and buildings in Idle village date back almost a century, and provide a significant remnant of Bradford's expansion during the Industrial Revolution. Idle's listed buildings can be found around Albion Road, Bradford Road, Cross Road, The Green, Greenfield Lane, Highfield Road, High Street, Howgate, Ley Fleaks Road, Town Lane, and Westfield Lane.

Under the western part of Idle runs the Frizinghall to Esholt sewage tunnel. One of the tunnel's ventilation shafts is located at the edge of the Hepworth and Idle Cricket Club's cricket field off Westfield Lane. A TV repeater transmitter is located near Idle Hill in Idle Moor.

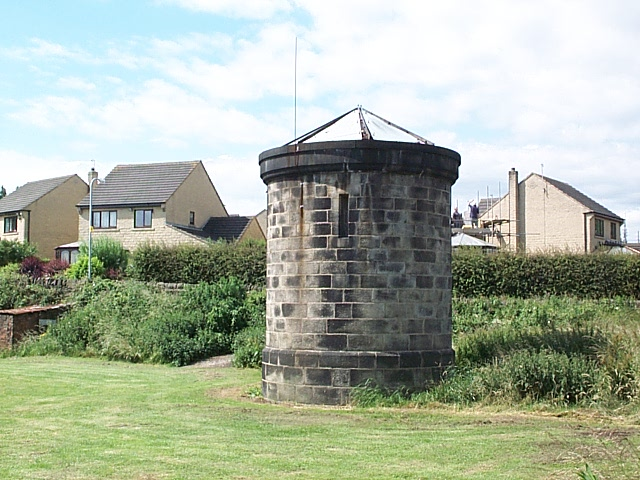
Frizinghall to Esholt sewage tunnel ventilation shaft, Westfield Lane

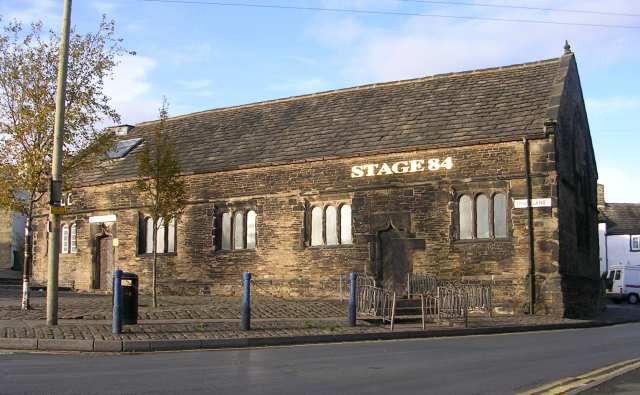
Old Chapel (1630), Town Lane

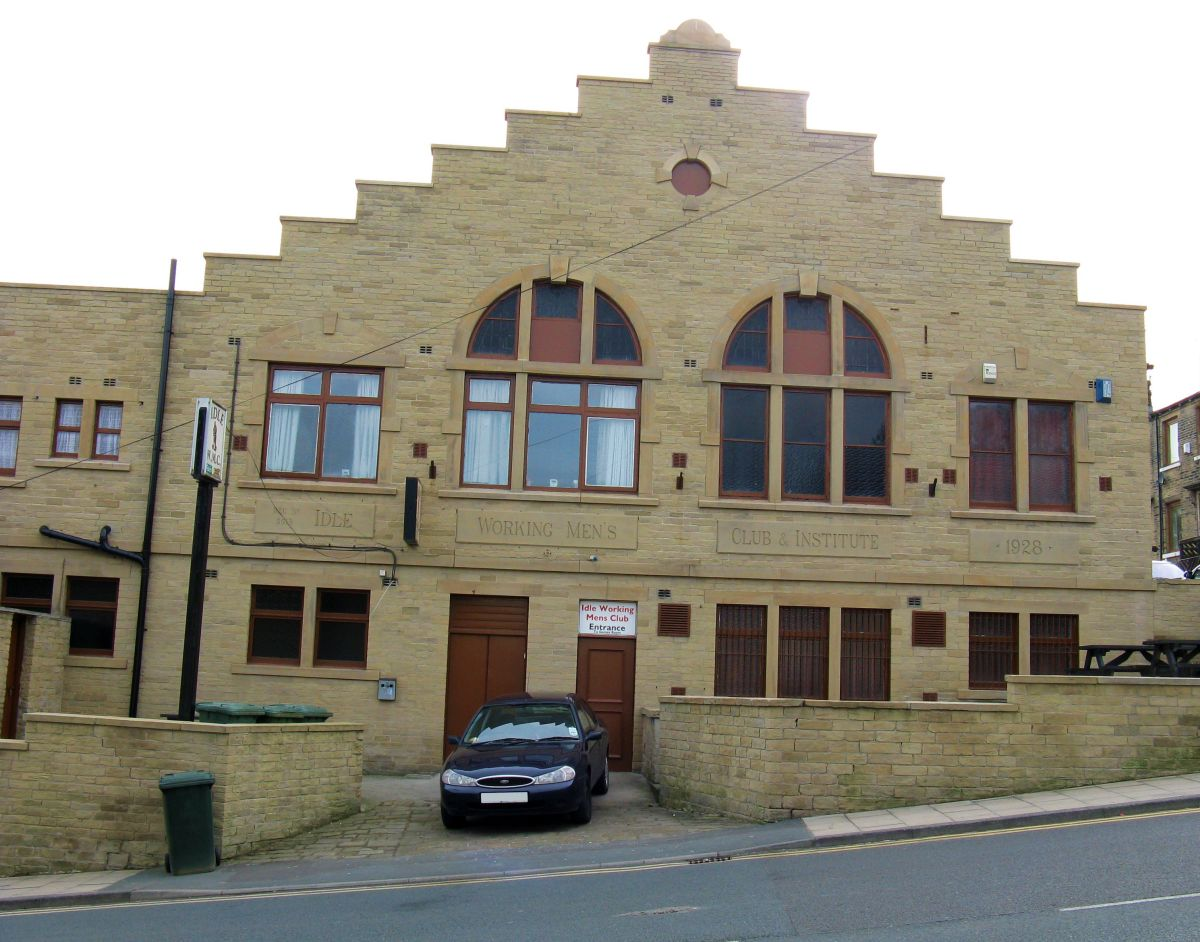
Idle Working Men's Club (1928), High Street

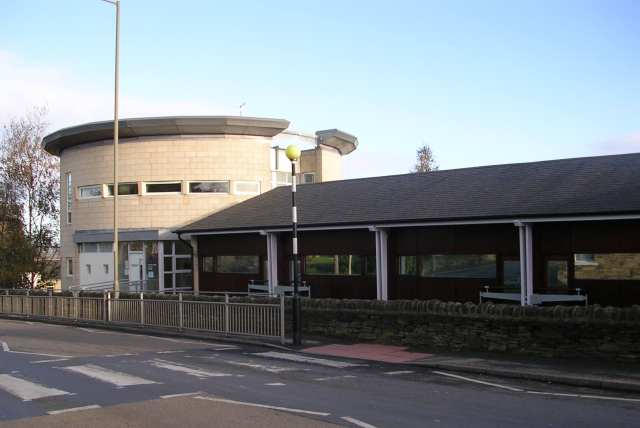
Idle Medical Centre, Highfield Road

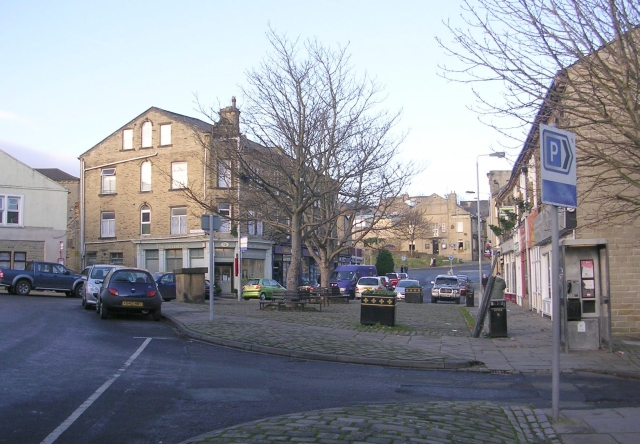
The Green

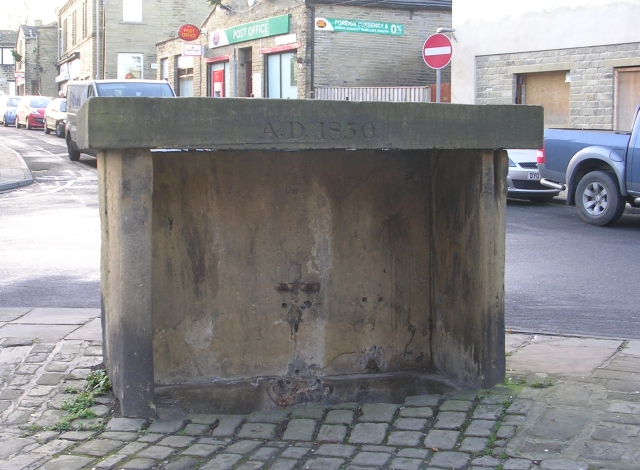
Cattle trough in The Green

=== Churches ===
Holy Trinity Parish Church, a large, impressive Victorian church dating from 1830, complete with graveyard and bell tower, is located on Town Lane. The United Reformed Church's Idle Upper Chapel is on Westfield Lane, and Idle Baptist Church is on Bradford Road.

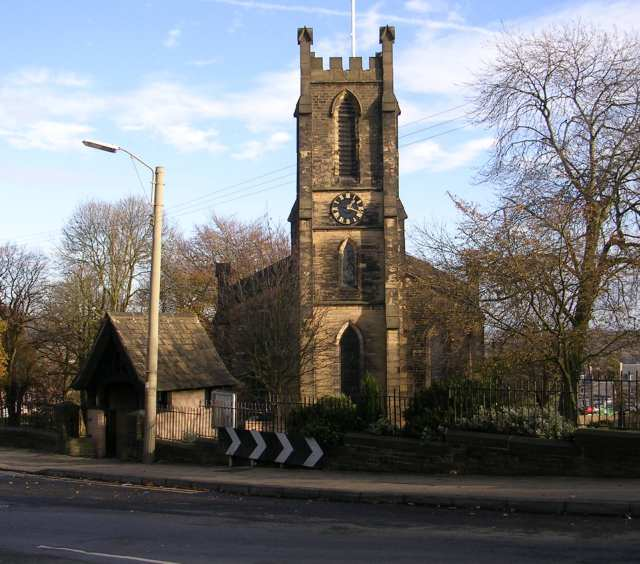
Holy Trinity Parish Church (1830), Town Lane

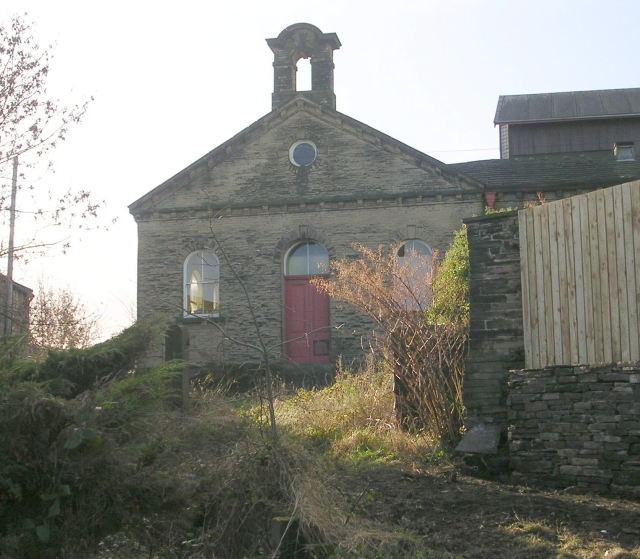
Former URC church, Westfield Lane

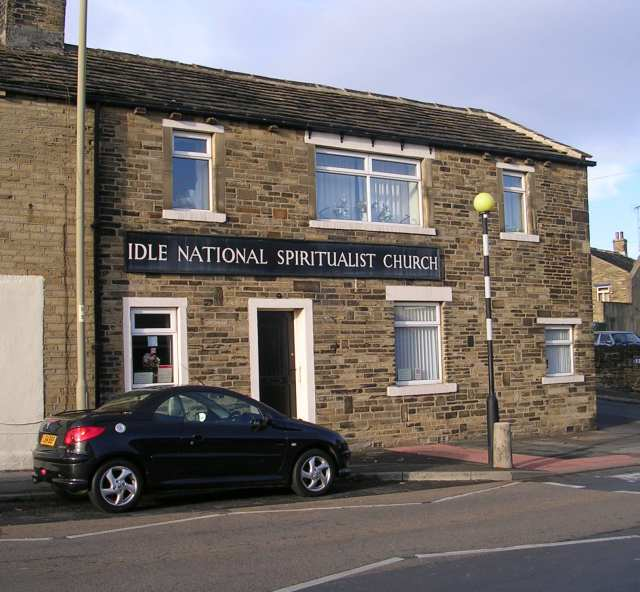
Idle National Spiritualist Church, Highfield Road

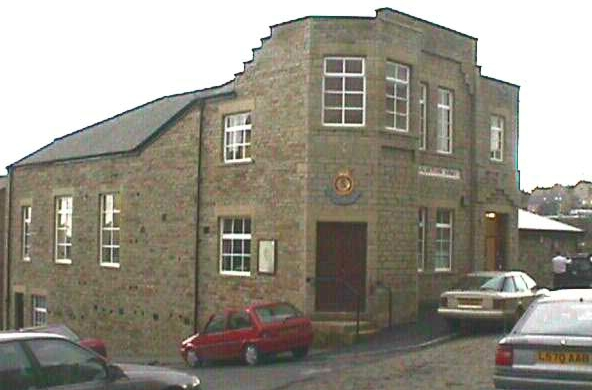
Salvation Army Idle Citadel (1900), Walter Street.

== Education ==
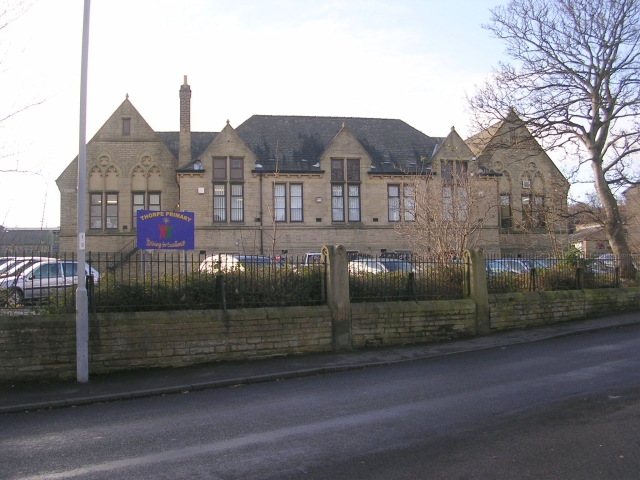
Thorpe Primary School

On Leeds Road is Immanuel CE Community College. Idle C.E. Primary School is on Boothroyd Drive, and Thorpe Primary School in Albion Road. The Stage 84 Performing Arts School is located in premises on Town Lane. Blakehill Primary School is on Highfield Road. Idle's branch library is on Albion Road.

== Sport ==
The village was home to several cricket pitches which hosted a number of teams, including Hepworth & Idle CC. The village has a football team with multiple age groups such as under 14s and younger.

Home of ocean rowing pair, Chris Nicholl and James Tordoff, of Team “Hell Oar High Water” who completed the 2019 Talisker Whisky Atlantic Challenge in a time of 44 days 21 hours and 58 minutes.

== Culture and events ==
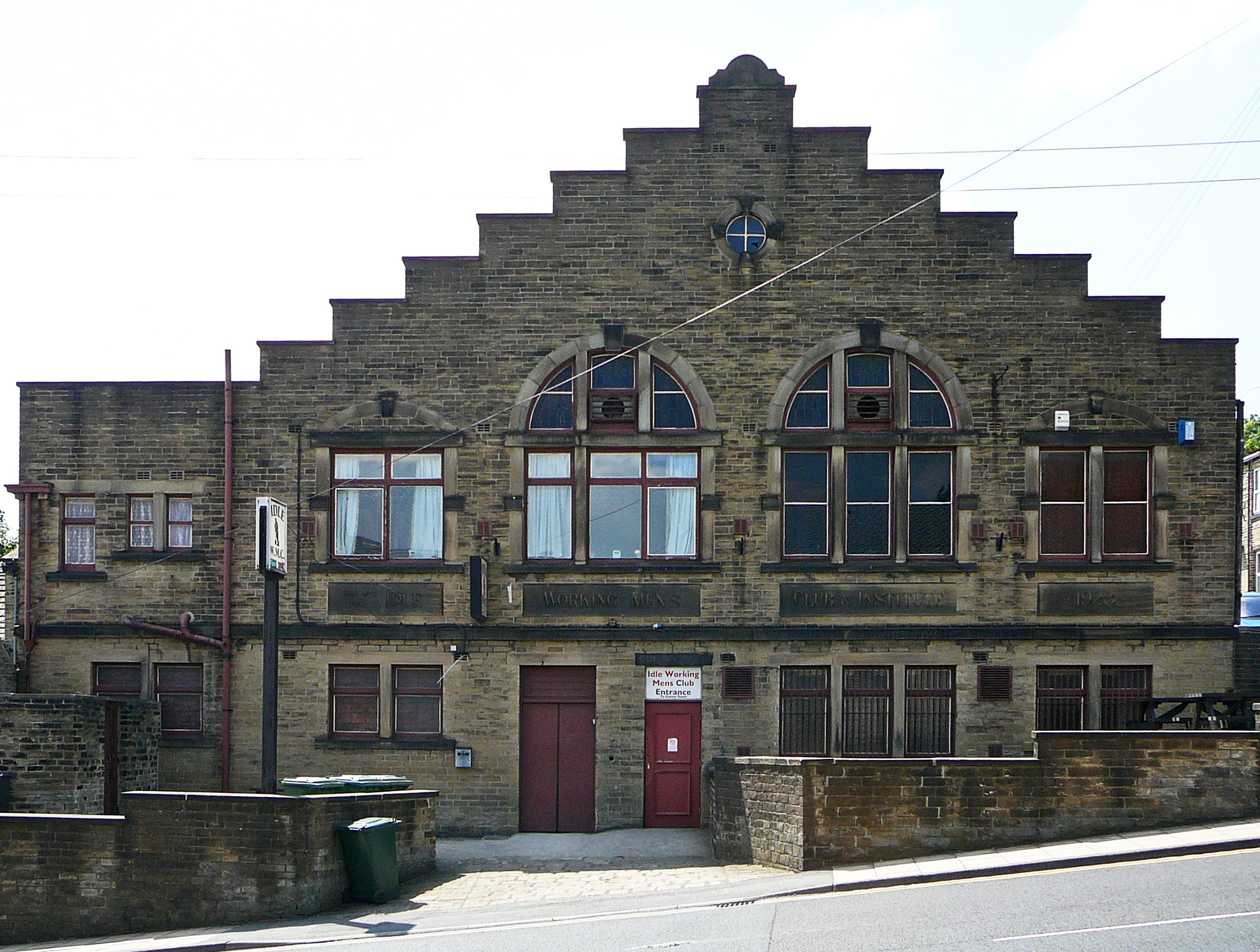
The Idle Working Men's Club Entrance

Musical groups in the area include the Idle and Thackley Operatic Society and the Idle Bell Ringers. The Idle Beer Festival is held at the Hepworth and Idle Cricket Club. The village is home to the Idle Men's Working Club (sometimes abbreviated to "Idle W.M.C"), renowned for its ironic name, the Idle W.M.C opened in 1928 by sewage workers unable to drink at local pubs after late working shifts. The club's honorary members include Mohammad Al Fayed, Paul Gascoigne and Michael Jackson.

Idle is also home to the Stage 84 School of Performing Arts and the ND Dance academy. Stage 84 was founded in 1984 and has produced shows for the Edinburgh Festival Fringe, St. George's Hall and the Alhambra Theatre. The school is also an approved examination centre for performers working to gain qualifications from LAMDA, Trinity College London and IDTA. Additionally, the school has trained famous performers including Jack P. Shepherd, Kimberley Walsh and Nikki Patel.

== Notable people ==
- Joseph Whitworth (1803–1887), engineer and entrepreneur, was educated at William Vint's Academy in Idle.
- Sir Robert Jennings (1913–2004) ("Robbie") QC, former President of the International Court of Justice and one time Whewell Professor of International Law at Cambridge University, was born and educated in Idle and spent his whole upbringing there until he won the scholarship to Cambridge which set him on his career.
- English actor Michael Rennie (1909–1971), best known for playing Klaatu in The Day the Earth Stood Still, was born in Idle
- Vic Feather, Trades union leader, was born in Idle in 1908.
- Adrian Edmondson, comic actor, writer, musician and director, was born in nearby Wrose but grew up in Idle.
- Hannah Midgley, former Emmerdale actress, has lived in Idle for most of her life.
- Dickie Watmough, former Bradford City, Blackpool and Preston North End footballer, was born in Idle.
- Yorkshire and England cricketer Doug Padgett was born in Idle and played for Idle Cricket Club.

== See also ==
- Listed buildings in Idle and Thackley
