= Play:groundNYC =

Park on Governors Island, New York

- Interactive map of Play:groundNYC
- Type: Adventure playground
- Location: 40 Barry Road, Governors Island, New York, NY 10004
- Coordinates: 40.689°N 74.0153°W
- Area: 15,000 square feet (1,400 m^{2})
- Operator: play:groundNYC
- Open: Free and open to the public weekends 12pm – 4pm (April 1 to November 17)
- Website: Official website

Play:ground NYC is a non-profit adventure playground that has operated on Governors Island in New York City since 2016 and advocates for access to space for free play.

== History ==
In 2014, Eve Mosher, an artist, and Alexander Khost, a youth rights advocate and web developer, began holding pop-up adventure play events in public parks after hitting on the idea at a child's birthday party. They founded play:groundNYC the following year together six other co-founders: Yoni Kallai, an acrobat and "circus strongman," Reilly Bergin Wilson, a play scholar, Robin Meyer, a playground designer, Jackie Katz, an arts educator, Anne Morosini, a non-profit project manager, and Philipp Klaus, an educator.

For the first 2 years of its existence in New York City, play:groundNYC ran several pop-up playgrounds to street fairs and several parks including Fort Greene Park. Shortly before setting up the permanent site on Governors Island, play:groundNYC installed and led an indoor adventure playground in the Brooklyn Children's Museum in January and February 2016. The installation was located on the second floor gallery and consisted of loose objects—cardboard boxes, fabrics, rope, tape, and other materials. It was staffed by playworkers. play:groundNYC partners with the Trust for Governors Island to open The Yard on Governors Island in 2016.

== Programs ==
=== The Yard (Governors Island junk playground) ===
On May 28, 2016, play:groundNYC opened a 50,000 square foot junk playground staffed by playworkers on Governors Island. The playground is divided into two sections: a "mud kitchen" for children ages 3 and up, and a larger "junk playground" for ages 6 and up. The mud kitchen consists of fabrics, tents, assorted toys, sticks, dirt, water, pots and pans, and mud. The junk playground contains hammers and nails, saws, shovels and other tools, tires, lumber, tarpaulin, pipes, and other materials.

In May 2018, the playground was renamed "The Yard" after the Yard, the first junk playground opened in the United States, in Minneapolis in 1949.

=== Pop-up play ===
play:ground holds pop-up playground events in New York City. It has brought pop-up playgrounds to street fairs and several parks including Fort Greene Park, Prospect Park, Maria Hernandez Park, Governors Island, and Brower Park.

=== Artist residency ===
During January and February 2016, play:groundNYC installed and led an indoor adventure playground in the Brooklyn Children's Museum. The installation was located on the second floor gallery and consisted of loose objects–-cardboard boxes, fabrics, rope, tape, and other materials. It was staffed by playworkers.

=== Play advocacy ===
Play:groundNYC hosts film screenings and panel discussions related to adventure playgrounds, playwork, "risky play," and racial, socio-economic, and other barriers to free play, such as "play-averse schooling regimes." These are generally held in museums and schools and feature The Land, a short documentary film about the nature of play, risk and hazard set in The Land, a Welsh "adventure” playground.

== See also ==
- Adventure playground
- Playwork
- Pop-Up Adventure Play
- Lady Allen of Hurtwood
- Roger Hart
