= Emdrup Junk Playground =

Adventure playground in Copenhagen, Denmark

Coordinates: 55.7184°N 12.5506°E

- Skrammellegepladsen, Emdrup
- Adventure playground, Copenhagen, 1965
- Interactive map of Emdrup Junk Playground
- Type: Adventure playground
- Location: Keldsøvej 5, 2100 København Ø, Denmark
- Nearest city: Copenhagen, Denmark
- Created: 1943
- Website: fi-lun.kbhbarn.kk.dk

The Emdrup Junk Playground (Danish: Skrammellegepladsen Emdrup) is an adventure playground located in Emdrup, a neighborhood in Copenhagen, Denmark.

== History ==
The Emdrup Junk Playground was the first planned junk playground and is frequently cited as the "birthplace" of playwork. It was opened in 1943 by a Workers' Cooperative Housing Association in Emdrupvej (or Emdrup), near Copenhagen, Denmark, during the German occupation of the 1940s. It grew out of a broader Danish resistance to Nazi occupation and parents' fears that "their children's play might be mistaken for acts of sabotage by soldiers."

The Emdrup Junk Playground emerged from a collaboration between Carl Theodor Sørensen, a Danish landscape architect commissioned by the architect Dan Fink to design a playground for the Emdrupvænge housing estate, and John (Jonas) Bertelsen (1917-1978), the playground's first "pædagoger". Sørensen had earlier worked in partnership with Hans Dragehjelm (1875-1948), the "father of the sand-box" and a co-founder of the Froebel Society in Denmark, on a plan to transform Cottageparken near Klampenborg, Denmark, into a children's park. Their proposal was ultimately rejected, but has provided scholars of play with insight into the historical context from which the Emdrup playground emerged. Sørensen’s initial design did not require an adult "pædagoger", but Bertelsen was hired as part of the housing policy of the Emdrup Workers' Cooperative Housing Association. Bertelsen stressed that play should be self-directed and pædagoger should allow children to pursue their own projects without adult interference. Together they aimed to build a site that would afford children living in cities the same opportunities for free play with waste materials and tools that were enjoyed by children living in rural areas.

The adventure playground is an attempt to give the city child a substitute for the play and development potential it has lost as the city has become a place where there is no space for the child's imagination and play. Access to all building sites is forbidden to unauthorized persons, there are no trees where the children can climb and play Tarzan. The railway station grounds and the common, where they used to be able to fight great battles and have strange adventures, do not exist any more. No! It is now not easy to be a child in the city when you feel the urge to be a caveman or a bushman. —John Bertelsen's Emdrup diary

The original site was minimally landscaped by Sørensen to evoke the elements of the Danish rural landscape: "the beach, the meadow, and the grove." The original site ran 65 meters from west to east and 82 meters in north to south, and consisted of a sandbox on a patch of grass enclosed by a fenced dyke planted with rosebushes, thornapple, and Acacia bushes, partly to screen the playground from view. (Note: Sørensen's designs for the playground are held by the Danish National Art Library and can be viewed here, on the library's website Emdrupvej / Keldsøvej, skrammellegeplads.) John Bertelsen coined the phrase skrammolog (or "junkology") to describe the children's play.

Marjory Allen, an English landscape architect and child welfare advocate, visited the Emdrup Junk Playground in 1946 for a few hours and wrote a widely-read article about the Emdrup Adventure playground titled Why Not Use Our Bomb Sites Like This?, which was published in Picture Post that year.

== Changes ==
Digging out holes underground and building houses on stilts were originally the main activities. Over time, the play area began to change with the demands from the children.

O'Connor and Palmer (2003) have described changes to the playground since 1943. While children's play remains free and self-directed, the construction area has dwindled since the 1960s and the diversity of scrap and construction materials has been reduced. Pre-built structures and a range of additional activities have been added. These include gardening, basketball, soccer, and a clubhouse on the site, theatre productions, and vegetable and flower gardening. Pre-programmed events have also been introduced, including the Skrammel Olympics and Cake and Bread Baking days. Periodic efforts to segregate children by age and to transform the skrammellegepladsen into a conventional playground have met with opposition from play advocates.

The Emdrup playground is staffed by Danish pedagogues (pædagoger) and their assistants, known as pædagog-medhjælpere. Pedagogues also facilitate meetings with the Parental Board of the recreational facility that houses the Emdrup Skrammellegepladsen.

== See also ==
- Adventure playground
