= Triangle Adventure Playground =

Playground in London, England

The Triangle Adventure Playground
- Location within Greater London
- Type: Adventure playground
- Location: Oval, London Borough of Lambeth
- Nearest city: London
- Coordinates: 51.482258°N 0.116088°W
- Website: Official website

The Triangle Adventure Playground is an adventure playground that has operated on Ashmole Street in Oval, in south London since 1957. It is the oldest adventure playground in London that is still located on its original site.

== History ==
The Triangle Adventure Playground was established in 1957 by Marjorie Porter (1907–2009), (Note: Further information about Marjorie Porter can be found in her autobiography, I Was Different: A Long Life in Education (2005, Propagator Press) and her papers in National Co-operative Archive.) Marjory Allen, and the London Council. Unlike many other adventure playgrounds established following the Second World War, the Triangle Adventure Playground was never a bombsite. It was established on land set aside for the Ashmole Primary School, which had been cleared as part of a programme of "slum clearance".

The playground is staffed by playworkers.
