= Adventure Playground (Berkeley) =

Urban park and playground in California

Adventure Playground, Berkeley
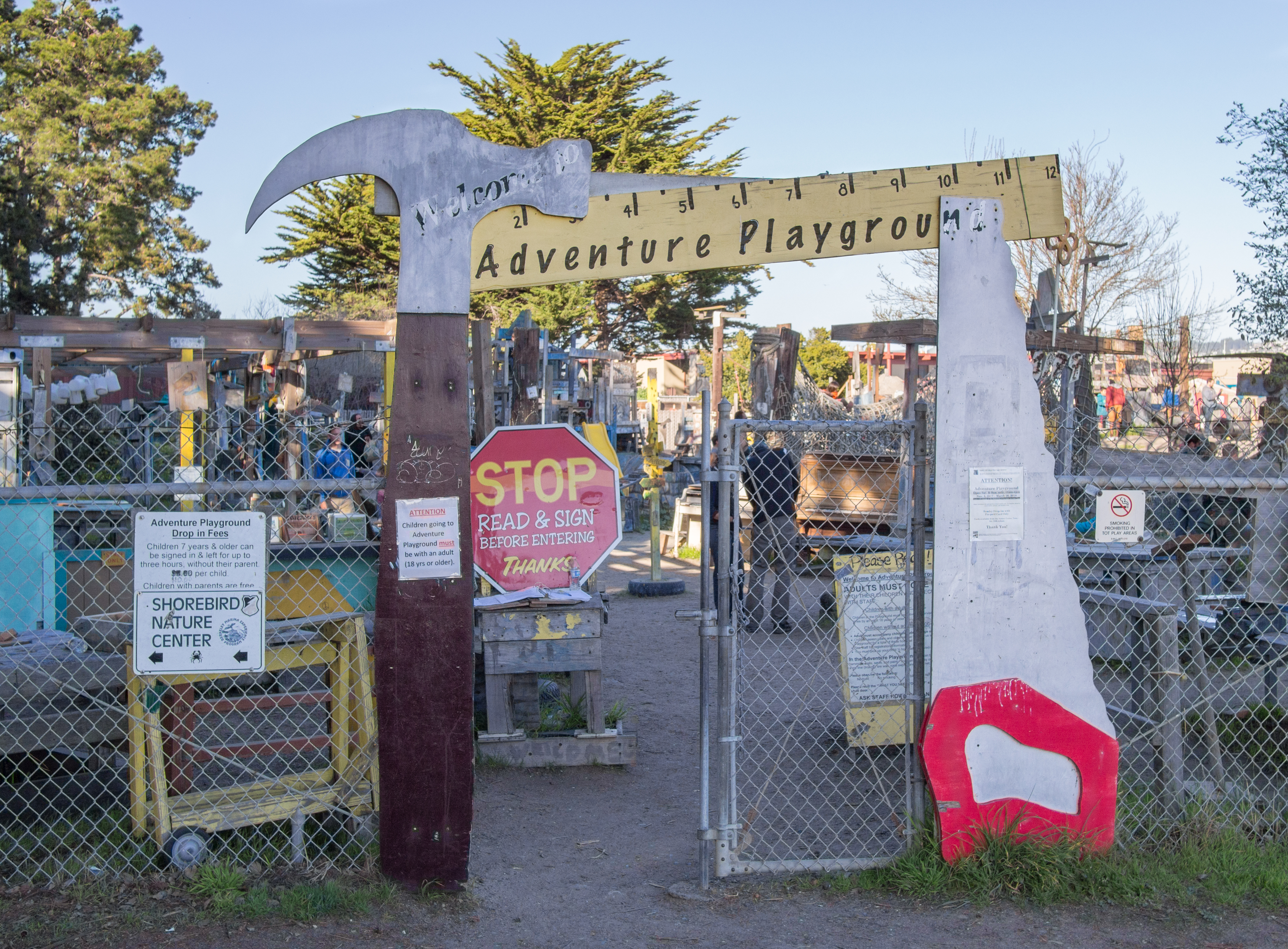
- Interactive map of Adventure Playground, Berkeley
- Type: Playground
- Location: Berkeley, California
- Coordinates: 37°51′47″N 122°18′52″W
- Operator: City of Berkeley, California
- Open: Monday-Friday 9:00 am-5:00 pm, Saturday & Sunday, 11:00 am–5:00 pm
- Website: Official website

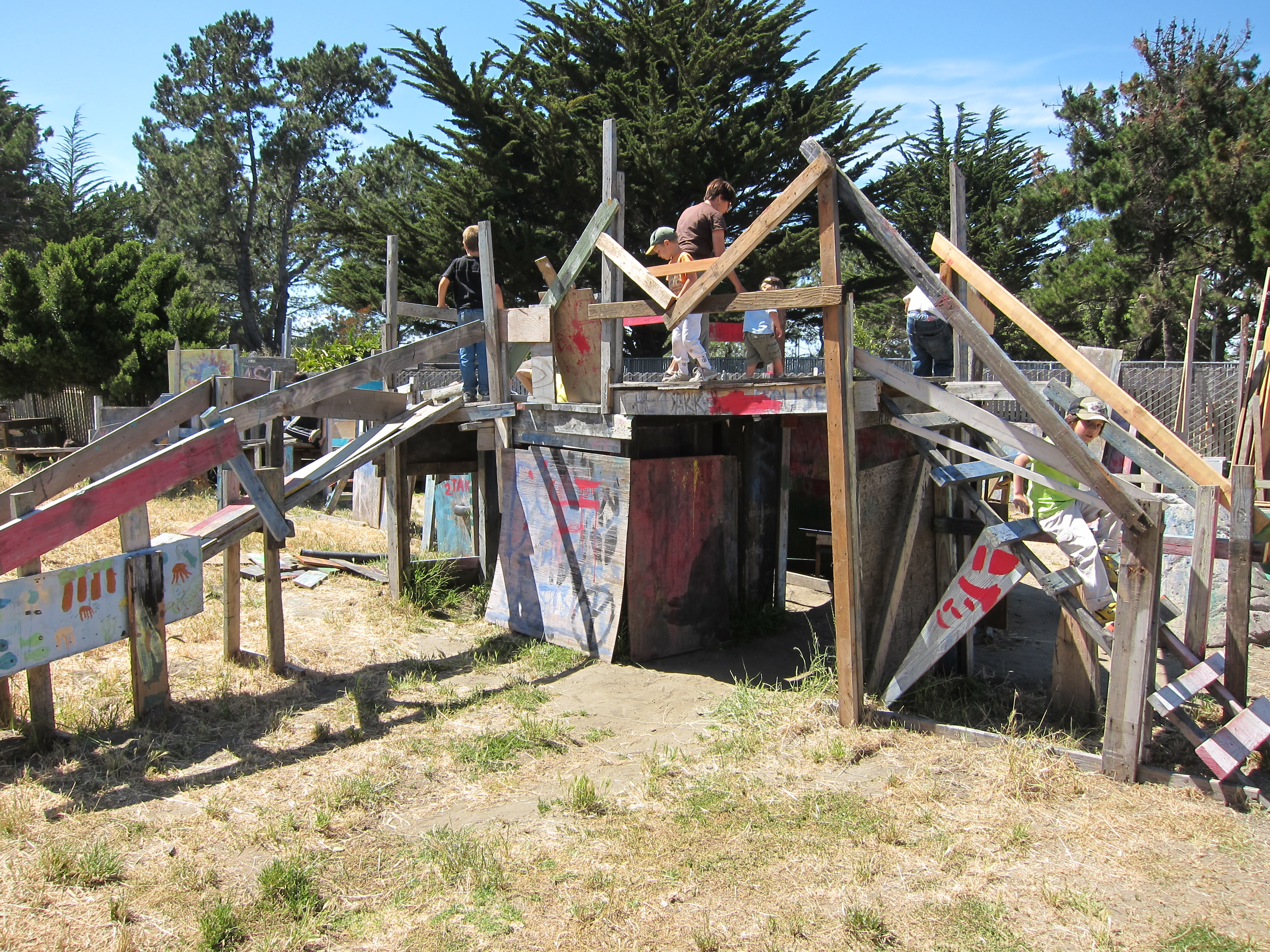
Play structure in the Adventure Playground

Adventure Playground is an urban park and adventure playground in Berkeley, California, located at the Berkeley Marina. The park opened in 1979 based on the ideas of Danish architect Carl Theodor Sørensen, who had made use of scrap junkyards for playgrounds when Copenhagen was under occupation during World War II. The adventure playground model, sometimes referred to as a "junk playground," is to provide children with the resources to build. The available tools include saws, hammers, workbenches, and nails. The legal liability raised by giving children relatively unrestricted access to these tools has made adventure playgrounds rare in the United States, with the Berkeley Adventure Playground being one of only four in the country.
