= Tarr Family Playground =

Playground in Central Park, New York City

Coordinates: 40°47′38″N 73°57′45″W

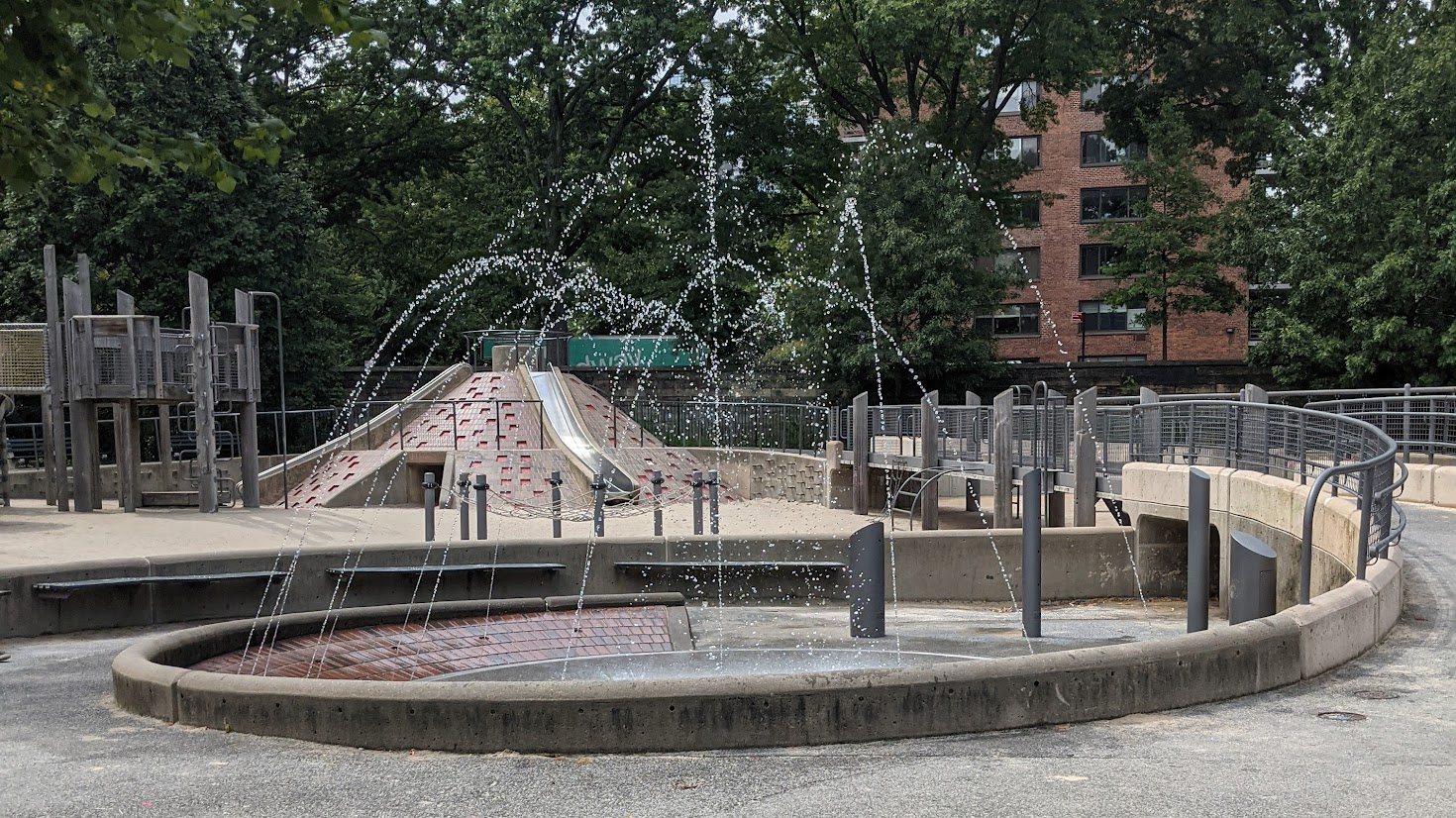
The water area of the playground with its bridge, treehouse, and pyramid in the background

Notable buildings and structures of Central Park. Click on the map and then on the points for details.
'"`UNIQ--templatestyles-00000001-QINU`"''"`UNIQ--templatestyles-00000002-QINU`"'

Tarr Family Playground is a playground in New York City's Central Park at West 100th Street and Central Park West. The playground features adventure-style design, was originally built in 1935–1936, and has been renovated twice since.

== Description ==
The playground is an adventure playground located near the north end of the park. It includes tire swings, traditional swings, monkey bars, net climbers, a concrete maze, a sandpit, and treehouse. Furthermore, the play area includes a bridge with a tunnel and climbing features, as well as a large pyramid with slides, tunnels, ladders, and net climbers. In addition, there is a water area featuring mist poles and floor jets, both activated using buttons.

The Central Park Conservancy maintains the playground.

== History ==
Tarr Family Playground was built in 1935–1936 as one of the park's perimeter playgrounds. It was renovated in 1972 after the play equipment had been damaged over the years. The renovation, which cost over $100,000, was funded by the Estée and Joseph Lauder Foundation. Architects Ross, Ryan, and Jaquette redesigned the playground as an adventure playground, including a maze with tunnels and slides, a tire and net structure, and a treehouse with a fireman's pole, and a net bridge. In addition, this renovation included ropes for swinging between a series of platforms, tire swings, traditional swings, a bridge with slides and ladders, a water area, and a pyramid with two roller slides and a tunnel. The water area consisted of an amphitheater with two repurposed fire hose nozzles which could be rotated to adjust their spray. On the opposite side of the central bridge was a smaller sprinkler for younger children. The water from this flowed into beneath the bridge and into the main amphitheater.

The Central Park Conservancy renovated the playground again in 2009. This renovation simplified the maze, reconstructed the treehouse, and replaced the majority of the sand below the play structures with rubber safety surfacing. Additionally, this renovation replaced the roller slides on the pyramid with traditional slides, modified the water area, expanded the sandbox and introduced water, simplified the tire swing structure, replaced the swinging ropes with a net climber, replaced the rope and tire structure with only ropes, and more.

Shortly after the playground was renovated, a thunderstorm destroyed many trees near the playground, including the two which were originally part of the treehouse. Consequently, the treehouse now stands as a standalone structure.
