= Murder of Carol Wilkinson =

1977 murder case in England

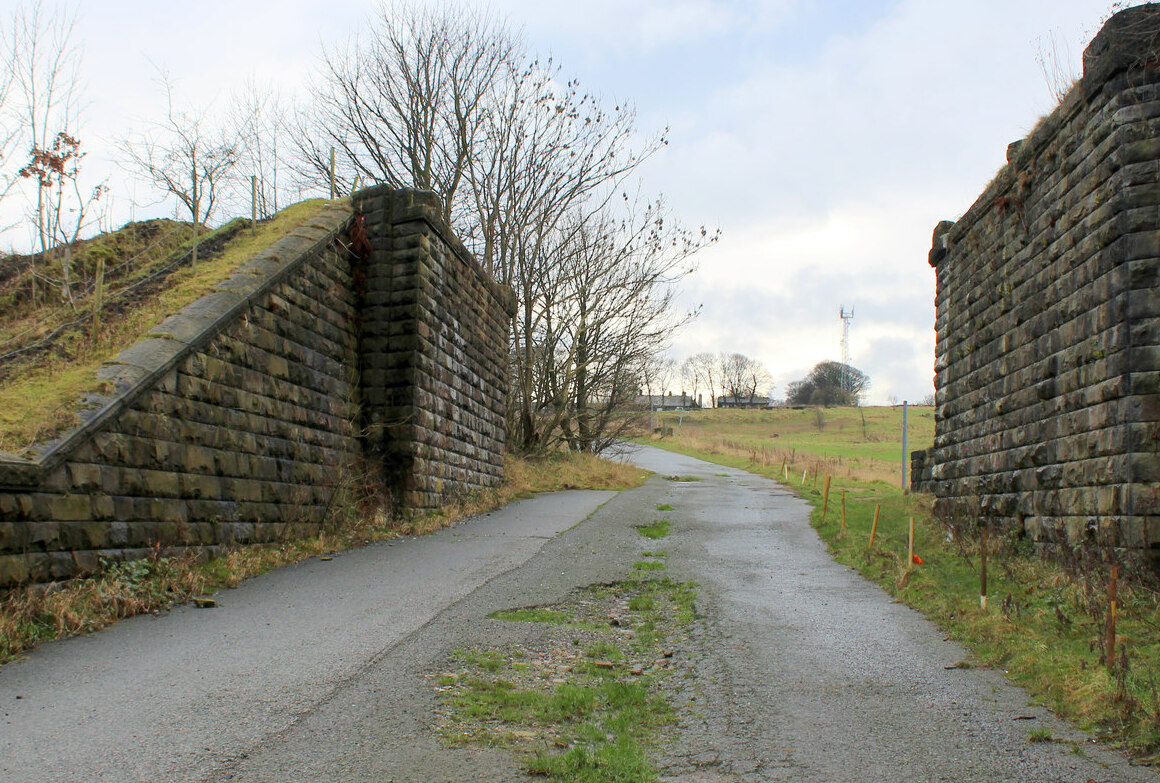
- The view towards the murder site in 2008. Wilkinson was found fatally injured in the field just by the buildings in the distance.
- Date: 10 October 1977
- Location: Woodhall Road, Bradford, West Yorkshire, England
- Type: Murder
- Accused: Anthony Steel

The murder of Carol Wilkinson, a 20-year-old woman who lived in Bradford, West Yorkshire, occurred on 10 October 1977. Anthony Steel spent 19 years in prison for the crime before his conviction was quashed in 2003. Steel died in 2007 at the age of 52.

Over the years, some writers and investigators have suggested that Peter Sutcliffe, the "Yorkshire Ripper", may have been Wilkinson's real murderer. Despite this, her case remains officially unsolved.

== Murder ==
Carol Wilkinson was attacked as she walked to Almond's Bakery, Gain Lane, Thornbury, where she worked as a clerk in the wholesale department. The attack took place in a field at the back of the bakery, which was about half a mile from her home in Ravenscliffe. Her best friend at work had heard her say she would not be walking the "muck road" route which Anthony Steel was said to have described in his confession.

Wilkinson was partially stripped, sexually assaulted and battered about the head with a large stone during the incident and found unconscious a short while later. After being found, she was taken to Bradford Royal Infirmary, where she remained on a life support machine for two days before the machine was turned off. This was the first time in Britain that a murder victim was certified dead while on life support.

== Conviction of Anthony Steel ==
Eighteen months after the killing, Steel's mother-in-law provided the police with a fish-shaped keyring, which the Crown alleged was taken from Wilkinson's handbag by the killer. This keyring was said to have been given by Steel to his future wife around the time of the murder. At the time of the murder, Steel was employed as a council gardener on the estate where the victim lived. The Crown also contended that Steel revealed details to the police that only the murderer would know.

In an interview regarding his confession, Steel explained that he was young and inexperienced with police custody. The pressure became overwhelming, leading him to say things to alleviate the stress. He felt intimidated as the police asserted their belief in his guilt, claiming they had proof and evidence. Steel believed that, due to the prolonged nature of the case, law enforcement was eager to convict someone to close the case, regardless of whether the individual truly fit the circumstances.

=== Conviction overturned ===
Steel was initially released on licence in 1998, and his conviction was quashed at the Court of Appeal in February 2003 due to new evidence from both defence and Crown consultant psychologists. They indicated that Steel was mentally handicapped and on the borderline of abnormal suggestibility and compliability, making him a significantly more vulnerable interviewee than was understood at the time of the trial.

Steel received an official police apology and government compensation in the region of £50,000–£100,000. However, he was in poor health following his release from prison. He died from a heart attack in hospital on 30 September 2007, aged 52, while awaiting further surgery.

== Links to Peter Sutcliffe ==
Over the years, some writers and investigators have suggested that Peter Sutcliffe, the "Yorkshire Ripper", may have been Carol Wilkinson's real murderer. Between 1975 and 1980, Sutcliffe committed 13 murders of women across Yorkshire and Manchester, his signature being to attack his victims from behind with blunt instruments. Wilkinson's murder was initially considered a possible "Ripper" killing but quickly ruled out as one, in part because Wilkinson was not a prostitute. However, police would admit by the end of 1979 that Sutcliffe did not only attack prostitutes, although by that time Steel had already been convicted of the murder. After Sutcliffe was convicted in 1981, writer David Yallop asserted that Steel had been wrongly jailed for the murder and that Sutcliffe was evidently the killer. He put forward these claims in a book titled Deliver Us from Evil, pointing out the similarities to Sutcliffe's known attacks in Bradford, Leeds and elsewhere. Wilkinson's murder took place nine days after Sutcliffe's murder of Jean Jordan in Manchester.

In 1978, it was widely reported that Professor David Gee, the Home Office pathologist who conducted the post-mortem examinations on all of Peter Sutcliffe's known victims, had observed that there were similarities between the murder of Carol Wilkinson and that of Yvonne Pearson, which was committed by Sutcliffe three months later. Like Wilkinson, Pearson was bludgeoned with a heavy stone and was not stabbed, and was initially ruled out as a Ripper victim. The similarities between Wilkinson and Pearson's cases led detectives to suspect not only that they might be linked to each other, but also that they might be copycat killings of the Ripper attacks. Pearson was re-classified as a Ripper victim in 1979, the year in which Steel was convicted of Wilkinson's murder. Yallop called for the conviction to be reviewed in 1981 because of the clear similarities, highlighting that Steel had always protested his innocence and been convicted on weak circumstantial evidence. Sutcliffe did not confess to Wilkinson's murder at his Old Bailey trial, although Steel was already the man serving time for the offence by then. During his imprisonment, Sutcliffe was noted to show "particular anxiety" at mentions of the murder, possibly due to the unsoundness of Steel's conviction.

Sutcliffe had in fact known Wilkinson and was known to have argued violently with her stepfather over his advances towards her. Sutcliffe knew the estate Wilkinson was killed on and was known to frequent the area, and in February 1977 – only months before the murder – was reported to the police for acting suspiciously on the street where Wilkinson lived. Another thing that links Sutcliffe to the killing is that earlier on the same day as Wilkinson's murder, Sutcliffe had gone back to mutilate Jean Jordan's body before returning to Bradford, showing he had already gone out to attack a victim that day and would have been in Bradford to attack Wilkinson after he came back from mutilating Jordan. The location of the attack on Wilkinson was very close to Sutcliffe's place of employment, T. & W. H. Clark, where he would have clocked in for work that afternoon.

In 2008, David Yallop again put forth the theory that Peter Sutcliffe was the true killer. In 2015, former detective Chris Clark and investigative journalist Tim Tate also supported the theory that Wilkinson was a victim of Sutcliffe in their book Yorkshire Ripper: The Secret Murders. They pointed out that her body had been posed and partially stripped in typical "Yorkshire Ripper" fashion, with her trousers and pants pulled down and her bra lifted up. ITV produced a documentary based on Clark and Tate's book in 2022, and this documentary is likewise titled Yorkshire Ripper: The Secret Murders.

== See also ==
- List of miscarriage of justice cases

== Bibliography ==
- Clark, Chris; Tate, Tim (2015). Yorkshire Ripper: The Secret Murders. The True Story of How Peter Sutcliffe's Terrible Reign of Terror Claimed at Least 22 More Lives. London: John Blake. ISBN 978-1-78418-418-6.
- Yallop, David (2014). Deliver Us from Evil. UK: Hachette. ISBN 9781472116581.
