= Eccleshill Adventure Playground =

Playground in Bradford, England

Coordinates: 53.8249°N 1.7098°W

The Big Swing
- Interactive map of The Big Swing
- Type: Adventure playground
- Location: Eccleshill, Bradford, West Yorkshire
- Nearest city: Bradford
- Operator: PlayBradford
- Open: Free and open to 5-13yr olds. Opening days and times vary depending on time of year and staff availability - call to check
- Website: Official website

Eccleshill Adventure Playground (organisation renamed PlayBradford in 2020), locally known as The Big Swing, is an Adventure playground that has operated in Eccleshill Park, Bradford, West Yorkshire since 2006. It is located beside the Ravenscliffe estate and provides open access adventure play for children and young people from five to sixteen years old. Most sessions however are for ages five to thirteen years old.

The playground is staffed by playworkers and runs a mobile play programme in deprived areas and a playworker apprentice programme.

Much like a school would, the charity needs to know emergency contact details for children that attend, whether this is for a one-off or regular attendance so as to be able to contact a responsible adult who lives with the child after the child has attended (e.g. to follow up after an incident that took place, or for track and trace purposes).

== The Big Swing ==
The Big Swing, which gives the playground its name, is the biggest of its kind in the north of England. An Adventure playground, The Big Swing has den and structure building, a cooking camp with fire, a 50 ft zip-wire, tools and loose parts, a jumping tower and slide, a playhouse, and two sunken trampolines.
