= Adventure playground =

Type of children's playground

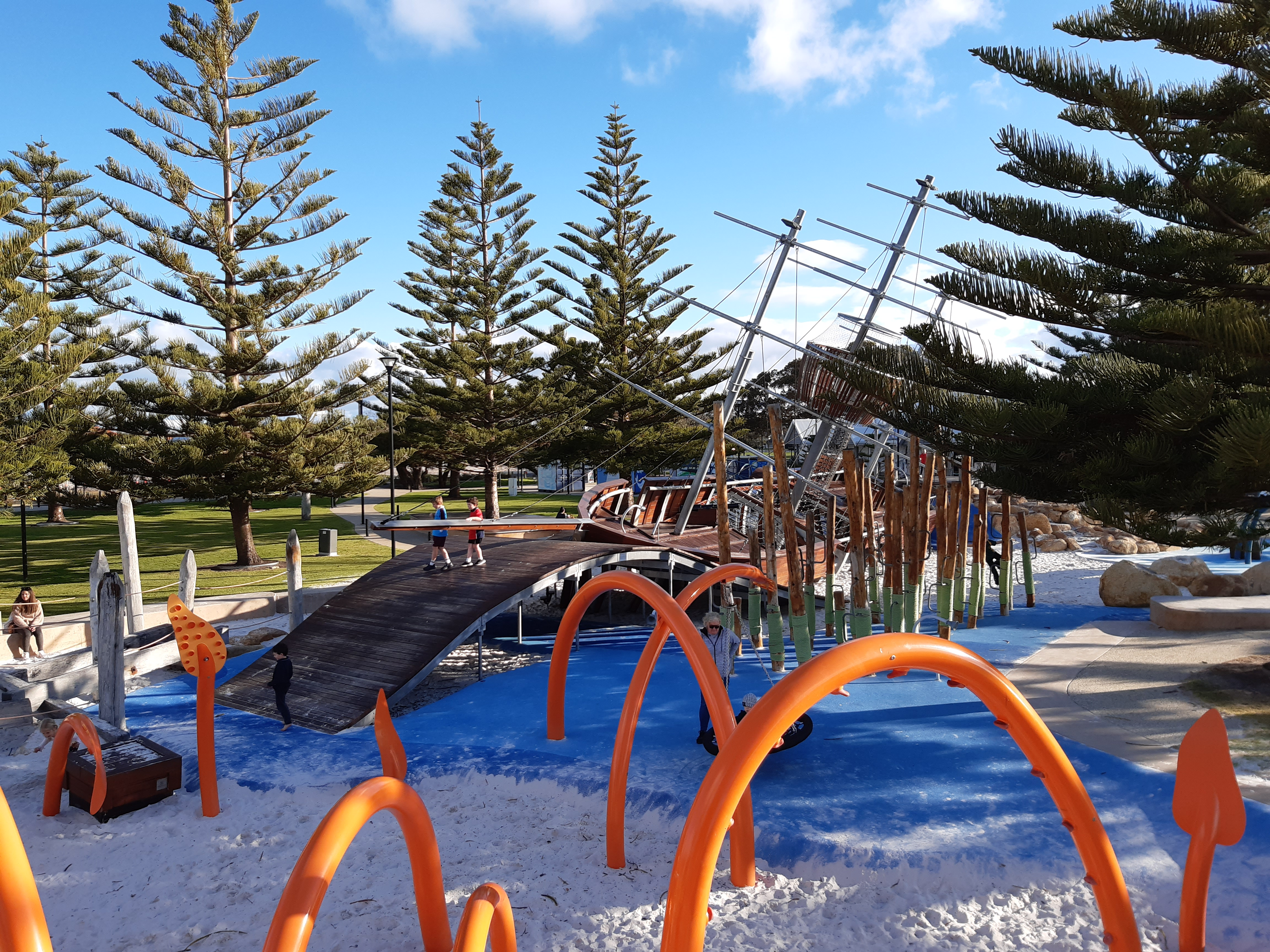
Busselton Foreshore Adventure Playspace with a sailing ship as part of the playground

An adventure playground is a specific type of playground for children. Adventure playgrounds can take many forms, ranging from "natural playgrounds" to "junk playgrounds", and are typically defined by an ethos of unrestricted play, the presence of playworkers (or "wardens"), and the absence of adult-manufactured or rigid play-structures. (Note: "Play is a process that is freely chosen, personally directed and intrinsically motivated. That is, children and young people determine and control the content and intent of their play, by following their own instincts, ideas and interests, in their own way for their own reasons." "Playwork Principles". playwales.org.uk. Playwork Principles Scrutiny Group. 2005. Archived from the original on February 25, 2017.) Adventure playgrounds are frequently defined in contrast to playing fields, contemporary-design playgrounds made by adult architects, and traditional-equipment play areas containing adult-made rigid play-structures like swings, slides, seesaws, and climbing bars.

== History ==
Adventure playgrounds are based on an idea from Danish landscape architect Carl Theodor Sørensen, who noticed that children were more fascinated by piles of scrap materials than the playgrounds that he had designed. In 1931, he articulated his vision of a "junk playground in which children could create and shape, dream and imagine a reality" that offered the play opportunities of rural areas to children in cities.

In 1943, the first adventure playground was set up by a Workers Cooperative Housing Association in Emdrup, Denmark, during the German occupation of the 1940s. The playground grew out of the spirit of resistance to Nazi occupation and parents' fears that "their children's play might be mistaken for acts of sabotage by soldiers". The 1946 book Why Not Use Our Bomb Sites Like This? caused "the idea of transforming bomb sites into 'junk playgrounds' to spread in the United Kingdom. The book, written by an English landscape architect and child welfare advocate Marjory Allen, discussed the Emdrup playground. Previous youth workers, including an art therapist in a Blitz-era play center in London, had identified permissive play as a tool to combat childhood aggression.

Mischievousness and sneaking around were criminalized in Nazi occupied Copenhagen, Adventure Playgrounds were born as a response. — Play:groundNYC, #playwork

Harry Shier, in Adventure Playgrounds: An Introduction (1984), defines an adventure playground as "an area fenced off and set aside for children" where they can "play freely, in their own way, in their own time" and "build and shape the environment according to their own creative vision". The spaces have been referred to with English terms such as "junk playground" (a calque from the Danish term skrammellegeplads), "waste material playgrounds", or "bomb-site adventure playgrounds". The term "adventure playground" was adopted in the United Kingdom "in an effort to make the ‘junk’ playground concept more palatable to local authorities".

British architect Simon Nicholson praised adventure playgrounds for teaching "the relationship between experiment and play, community involvement, the catalytic value of play leaders, and indeed the whole concept of a free society in miniature.'" He argued that in a play area, or any environment, "the degree of inventiveness and creativity, and the possibility of discovery" are correlated with the number and variety of what he called "loose parts", such as old tires, hammers and nails, mud, and random found objects.

Play advocates have emphasized the importance of adventure playgrounds for children of color in the United States, where policing "can feel like a kind of occupation".

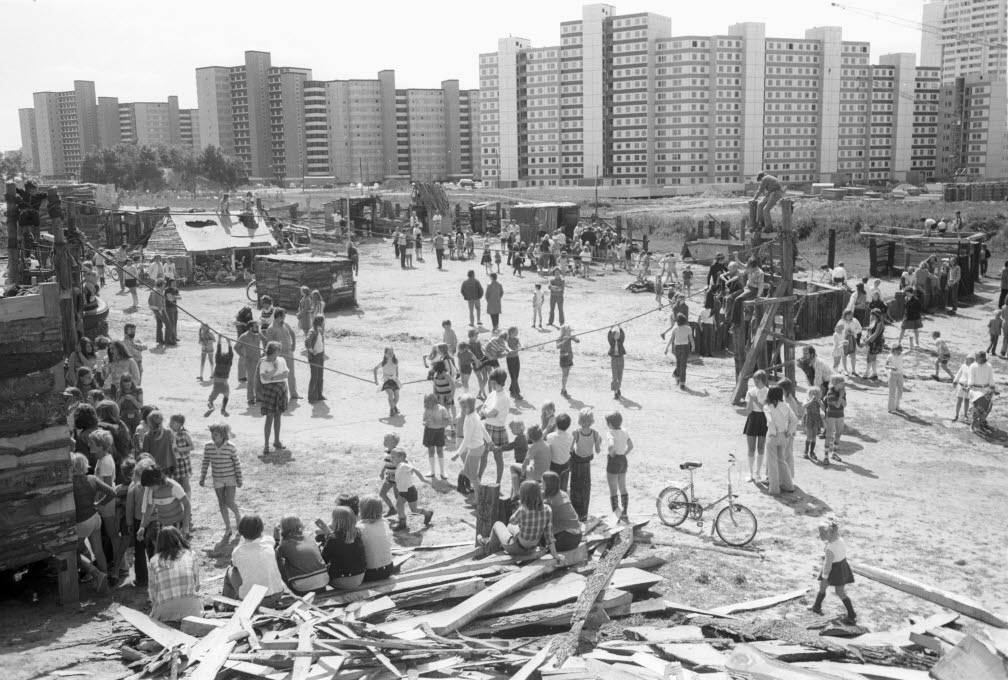
A children's festival at an adventure playground in Kiel, Germany

== List of adventure playgrounds ==
As at 2015 or earlier, there were about 1000 adventure playgrounds in Europe, most of them in England, Denmark, France, Germany, The Netherlands, and Switzerland. There are also adventure playgrounds in Japan.

This is an incomplete list.

=== The Americas ===
Canada

- TELUS Spark, in Calgary, Alberta has a Junkyard Playground open in the summer months.
- The city of Calgary, in Alberta, Canada, piloted a mobile adventure playground in five city parks during the summer of 2016.
- Toronto Ontario hosted an Adventure Playground from 1974 until the mid-1980s. It was a part of the revitalization of the waterfront called Harbourfront Centre.
- The City of Coquitlam in British Columbia created an Adventure Playground in the summer of 2018 as a pilot project.

United States

- The Yard, established in Minneapolis, Minnesota in 1949, the first adventure playground in the United States
- Adventure Playground in Berkeley, California, established in 1979
- Huntington Beach Adventure Playground in Huntington Beach, California, established in the 1970s
- Adventure Playground in Irvine, California
- Sacramento Adventure Playground in Sacramento, California
- The Hands-on-Nature Anarchy Zone in Ithaca, New York, established in 2012
- Adventure Playground at The Parish School in Houston, Texas
- Play:groundNYC on Governors Island in New York City, established in 2015
- SCV Adventure Play Foundation in Val Verde, CA.
- Heckscher Playground in New York City's Central Park
- Tarr Family Playground, also in Central Park in New York City

=== Asia ===
Japan

- The Setagaya Play Park or "Junk Playground" in Hanegi Park in Setagaya ward, Tokyo, Japan. (Note: The Setagaya Play Park was featured in episode 48 of Arirang's "Going Global" series "Going Global _ Japan "adventure playground"". www.arirang.com. ARIRANG CULTURE. Archived from the original on 2021-12-19.)
- Children’s Dream Park 川崎市子ども夢パーク (or "Yume Park") in Shimosakunobe, Kawasaki Takatsu Ward, Kanagawa Prefecture, Japan.

=== Australia ===
==== Australian Capital Territory ====
- POD Playground at the National Arboretum, Canberra.
- Ridgeline Park Playground,Denman Prospect
- Ruth Park Playground, Coombs

==== New South Wales ====
- Bungendore Park. Bungendore
- Carberry Park Adventure Playground, Gundagai
- The Adventure Playground Jubilee Park. Cootamundra

==== Northern Territory ====
- Jingili Water Gardens Playground, Darwin
- Adventure Play Park. Katherine

==== Queensland ====
- Flagstone Adventure Playground and Skate Park. Flagstone.
- Hinterland Adventure Playground. Cooroy
- The Jungle Adventure Play. Tingalpa
- Hervey Bay Adventure Playground. Pialba

==== South Australia ====
- Jubilee Park Adventure Playground. Port Noarlunga
- Monash Adventure Park. Monash
- St Kilda Adventure Playground. St Klida

==== Tasmania ====
- Kingston Park Playground. Hobart
- Riverbend Park. Launceston

==== Victoria ====
- Hays Paddock playground, Kew East
- KidsTown Adventure Playground. Shepparton
- Lake Pertobe Adventure Playground. Warrnambool
- The Venny, Kensington Adventure Playground. Kensington.
- Community Bank® Adventure Playground Hadfield Park. Wallan

==== Western Australia ====
- All Ages Playground. Katanning, Western Australia.
- Manjimup Heritage Park Adventure Playground. Manjimup
- Rio Tinto Naturescape. Perth.
- Chevron Parkland, Optus Stadium. Perth.

=== Europe ===
Denmark

Denmark has several adventure playgrounds, now known as Byggelegeplads (Building-playground) and formerly as Skrammellegeplads (Junk-playground). From the first site in Emdrup, the idea spread across the country and at the height of the popularity in the 1960s, there were about 100 adventure playgrounds in the country. Present active adventure playgrounds in Denmark includes:

- Skrammellegepladsen in Emdrup, Copenhagen.
- Bredegrund Byggelegeplads on Amager, Copenhagen.
- Remiseparken, on Amager next to Bredegrund.
- Regnbuen in Hvidovre, a suburb of Copenhagen.
- Rødovre Byggelegeplads in Rødovre, a suburb of Copenhagen.
- Byggelegepladsen Broparken, Rødovre.
- Byggelegepladsen Rønneholm, Rødovre.
- Højkjær Byggelegeplads in Brøndby, a suburb of Copenhagen.
- Skolemarken in Aarhus.
- Søndergård in Lystrup, a suburb of Aarhus.

Germany

- Abenteuerspielplätze und Kinderbauernhöfe in Berlin, or AKiB for short, is a federation of adventure playgrounds and children's farms in Berlin, Germany

Italy

- Ai Pioppi Playground, Nervesa della Battaglia.

Netherlands

- Jorgensland, a self-contained adventure playground on an island in Amsterdam

Sweden

- St Hans bygglekplats in Lund
- Borgarparkens bygglekplats in Lund
- Klostergårdens bygglekplats in Lund

Switzerland

- Robi-Spiel Aktionen—An organization of adventure playgrounds in Basel, Switzerland

United Kingdom

- Camberwell, London
- The Triangle Adventure Playground in Oval, South London. London's oldest adventure playground still located on its original site.
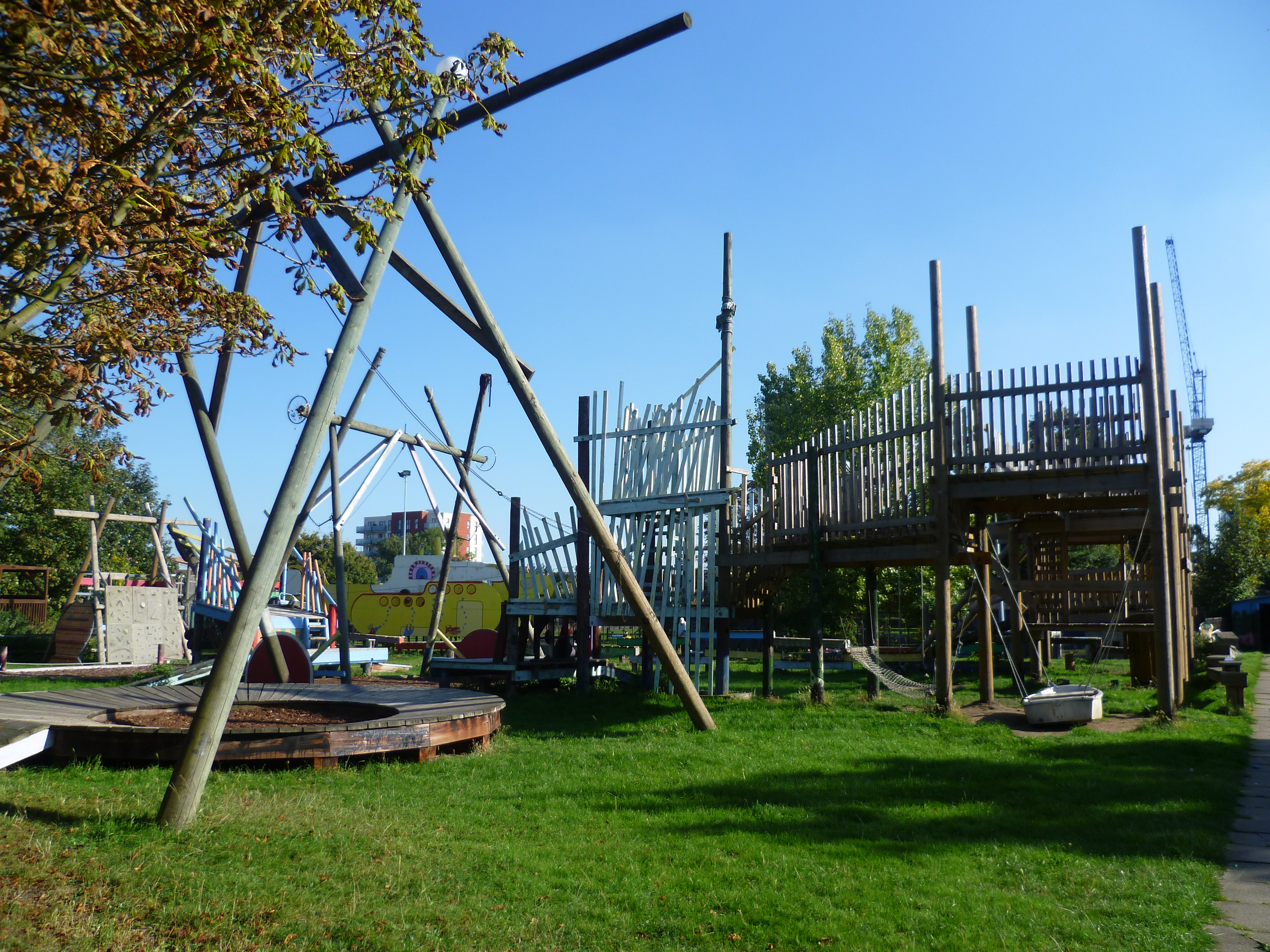
- Slade Gardens Adventure Playground in Stockwell, London, UK.
  Slade Gardens Adventure Playground, Stockwell, London.
- Lollard Street Adventure Playground, Kennington, London.
- Willington Road Adventure Playground, Stockwell, London
- Evergreen Adventure Playground, Dalston, London
- The Playground aka Adventure Play Hub, St John's Wood, London
- Glamis Adventure Playground Tower Hamlets, London
- Weavers Adventure Playground, Tower Hamlets, London
- Eccleshill Adventure Playground, (also known as The Big Swing) Bradford
- Lockleaze Adventure Playground, Bristol
- Felix Road Adventure Playground, Bristol
- St Paul's Adventure Playground, Bristol
- The Land (Adventure playground), Wrexham, Wales
- Meriden Adventure Playground Solihull, West Midlands

== Literature ==
- C. Th. Sørensen (1931): "Parkpolitik i Sogn og Købstad", (in Danish)
- "Risk and Safety in Play: The law and practice for adventure playgrounds (2003)"
- Joan Almon, Editor. (2017) Playing It Up—With Loose Parts, Playpods, and Adventure Playgrounds, Annapolis, MD: Alliance for Childhood.
- Mike Lanza (2012): "IPlayborhood. Free Play Press

Academic

- BDJA: Adventure playgrounds and city farms in Europe and what they contribute to sustainable urban development, a study from Germany
- Kotliar I.A. and Sokolova M.V. (2014). "Adventure Playground as an Example of the Child's Right to Play". Psychological Science and Education Psyedu.ru. 6 (no.2) (2): 81–90. doi:10.17759/psyedu.2014060207.
- Leichter-Saxby, Morgan (2007) Constructing the “Natural” Child: The Materiality of Play, Power and Subversion at Evergreen Adventure Playground. M.A. thesis, University of London. Retrieved 22 January 2017.
- Sutton, Lia (2005): Kinderparadijs (Children's Paradise): Advancing the Adventure Playground Movement, a student's thesis (Hampshire College, Massachusetts)
- Wilson, Reilly Bergin (2014) Who Owns the Playground: Space and Power at Lollard Adventure Playground (1954–1961). M.A. thesis, University of Leeds.
- Ben Highmore, Adventures in Lollard Street: An Experimental London Playground, 1955–60, History Workshop Journal, Volume 97, Spring 2024, Pages 174–195, https://doi.org/10.1093/hwj/dbae001

== Film ==
- Erin Davis (2015): The Land
- British Pathé (1950–1959): Come Out To Play Reel 2 1950–1959 includes a "junk playground" sequence.
- William H. Whyte (1980): The Social Life of Small Urban Spaces includes a "junk playground" sequence.
- Alliance for Childhood – play:ground NYC

== Arts and Theatre ==
- Junkyard (musical) written by Jack Thorne about Lockleaze Adventure playground (or ‘The Vench') in Bristol.

== See also ==
- Children's street culture
- Home zone/Play street
- Playwork
- Pop-Up Adventure Play
- Sudbury School
- Tinkering School
- Makerspaces
- Free-range parenting
- Forest kindergarten
- Lady Allen of Hurtwood
