= Huntington Beach Adventure Playground =

Park in California, United States

- Type: Adventure playground
- Location: 7111 Talbert Ave. Huntington Beach
- Nearest city: Huntington Beach, California
- Established: 1976
- Open: June 20 - August 19, 10:00 am to 4:00 pm, Monday through Saturday, closed Sundays and July 4th. Play ends at 3:40 pm for cleanup.
- Website: Official website

Huntington Beach Adventure Playground is an adventure playground located within Huntington Beach Central Park in Huntington Beach, California. The first adventure playground in Huntington Beach was established in the 1970s at the bottom of a quarry pit not far from the playground's present site. The original playground included a small shack, office, snack bar, and tool shed. After a number of years in its original location, and a temporary interim nearby due to flooding, the adventure playground was relocated to its present location in 1983. The adventure playground consists of several acres with a shallow pond, treehouses, a "mud park", rafts, rope climbing features, loose parts and scrap wood, and tools.

== See also ==
- Adventure playground
- Playwork
