= The Hands-on-Nature Anarchy Zone =

Children's play area in Ithaca, New York

Hands-on-Nature Anarchy Zone
- Type: Adventure playground
- Location: Cass Park Access Rd, Ithaca, NY 14850
- Nearest city: Ithaca, New York, USA
- Area: 1/3 acre
- Established: 2012
- Open: 7 AM to 7 PM
- Website: Official website

The Hands-on-Nature Anarchy Zone (or Anarchy Zone, or HONAZ) is an Adventure playground located in the Ithaca Children's Garden in Ithaca, New York. The Anarchy Zone was created in 2012 with support from Park Foundation through a partnership of the Ithaca Children's Garden, the US Fish & Wildlife Service, and EarthPlay. The Anarchy Zone consists of a play-area of a third of an acre with a large mud pit, sand and clay, trees and stumps, and many loose materials: logs, straw bales, soil, cardboard, rocks, and so forth.

The Anarchy Zone is staffed by playworkers.
