= Bohlenplatz =

Town square in Erlangen, Bavaria

Coordinates: 49.59671°N 11.01162°E

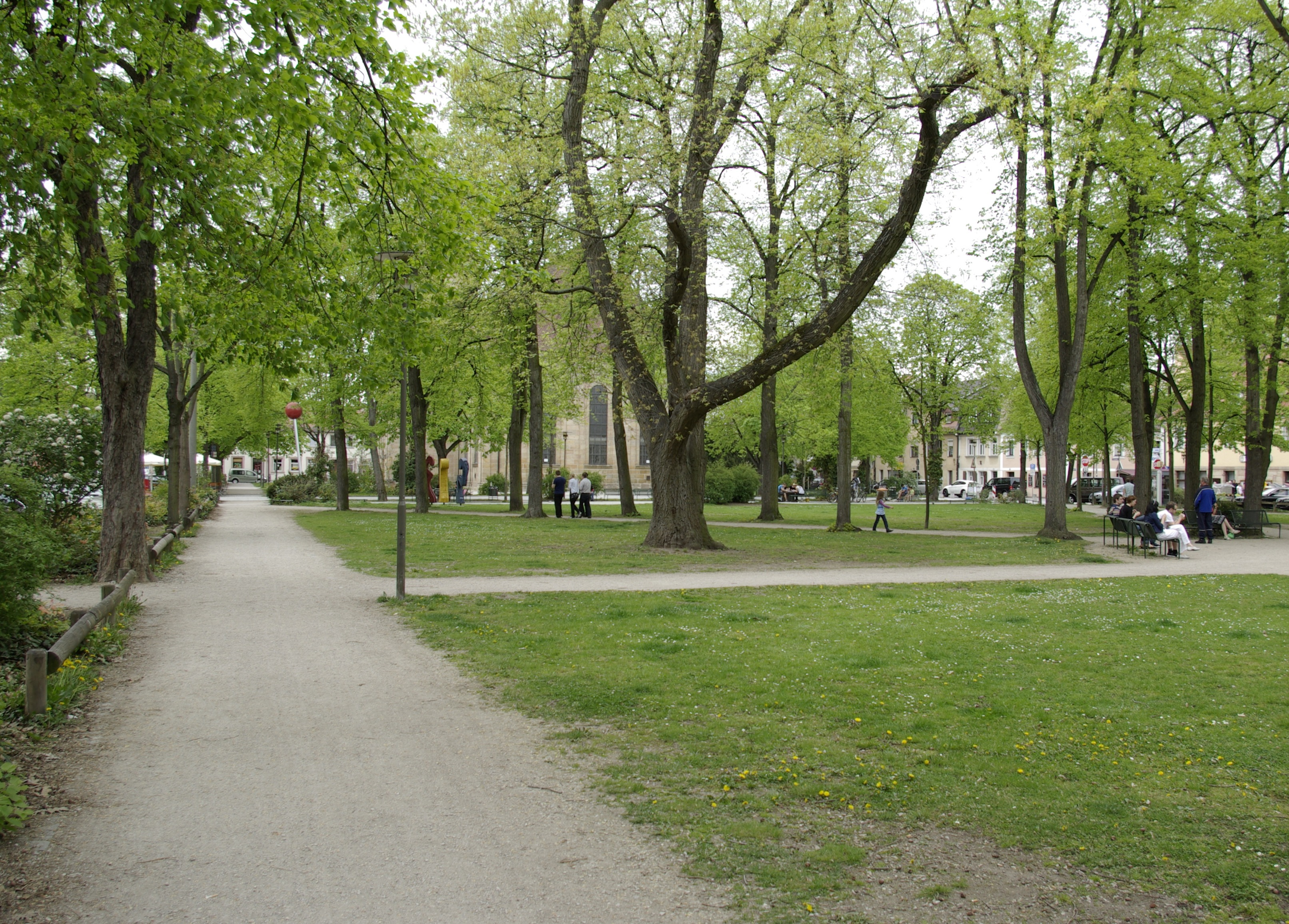
Green area at Erlanger's Bohlenplatz (2012)

The Bohlenplatz is a town square in the city of Erlangen, in the German state of Bavaria. It is known for its green area and is the site of a traditional Erlanger flea market. Bohlenplatz is the location of a one-time German church that is now used under the name Kreuz+Quer - Haus der Kirche Erlangen as an event site for the Evangelical Lutheran deanery of Erlanger.

== History ==
Bohlenplatz was known as the centre of the German Reformed Church. In the 19th century, the name Polenplatz was established for this square as well as the adjacent eastern block. In 1872, the name was changed to its current name, Bohlenplatz, referencing the social environment and their confused reinterpretation of a building yard used by Polish carpenters. From 1933 to 1945, the square was named after anti-Semitic journalist and publisher Dietrich Eckart. The original single-story houses of the city's stocking makers and craftsmen were enlarged or rebuilt. The site was for scree and as a sand pit. In 1780, however, attempts were made to counteract this by planting trees. For example, mulberry trees were planted for sericulture in 1826. In 1887, an overall design was carried out that approximately corresponded to the present square. The last major redesign took place in 1982.

The eastern half of the square was developed with the establishment of the new Building Office of the University in 1970.

A 222-meter deep artesian well on the south-east corner of the Bohlenplatz was built between 1864 and 1869. It did not supply the desired quantities of water and was abandoned in 1945. In 1919, the city built one of the first two children's playgrounds in Erlangen on the Bohlenplatz.

== Description ==
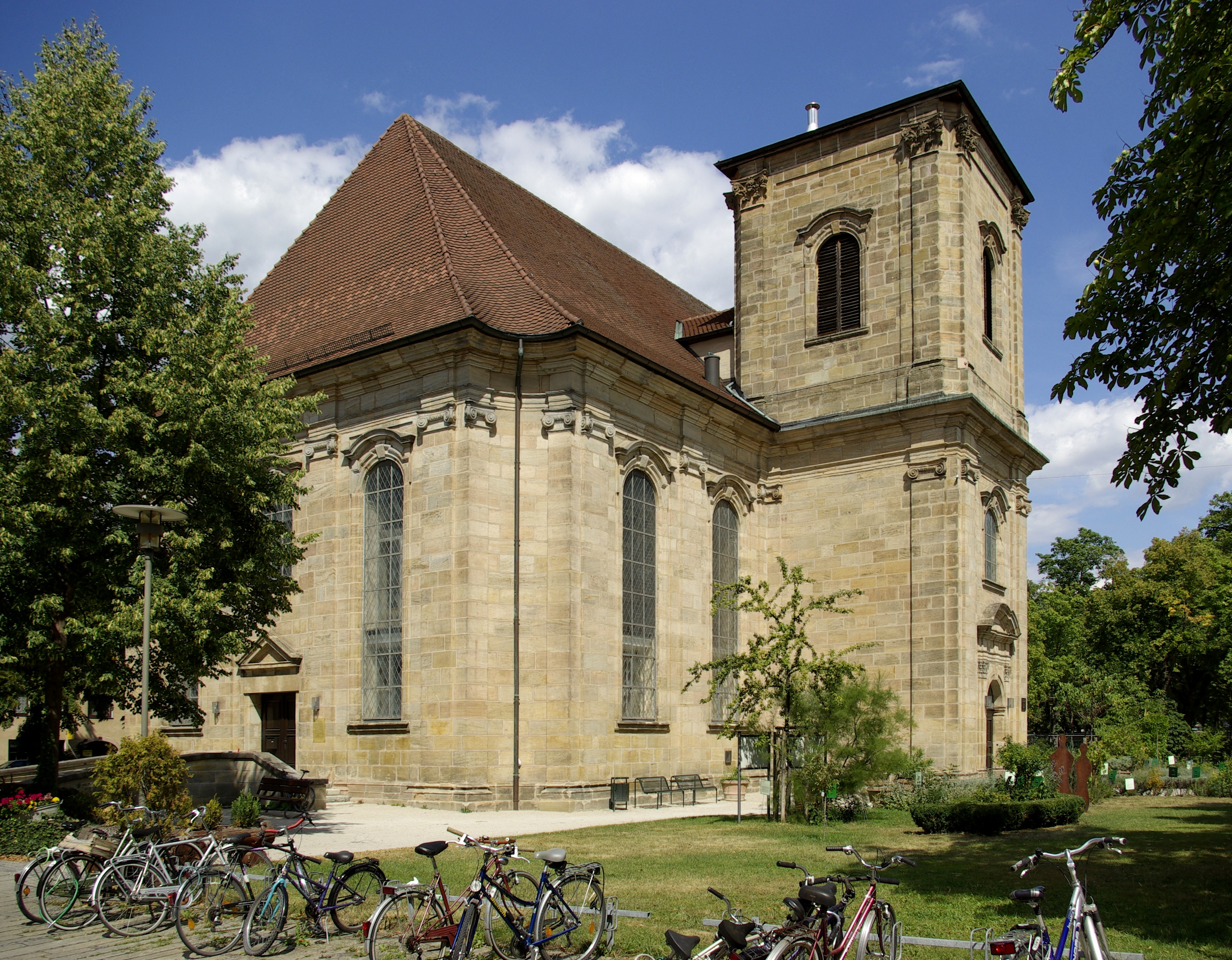
Erlanger's German former Church (2012)

The Bohlenplatz is an approximately 200×80-meter square in the historical old town of Erlangen, arranged in a west–east direction. Although it was not built until later, the square fits the pattern of Erlangen's New Town as a Baroque planned city. The square is bordered to the south by the Friedrichstraße-Luitpoldstraße street, to the north by the Obere Karlstraße-Marquardsenstraße street and the east by the Östliche Stadtmauerstraßee-Waldstraße street. Raumerstraße starts from the southern extent. A footpath and cycle path in the "Flucht Krankenhausstraße-Holzgartenstraße" divide the square into two unequal parts. The former German Reformed Church occupies the western third. The eastern part is leafy and parklike. A children's playground is available. The eastern end is marked by the new building of the University Authorities which was built in 1970.

== Literature ==
- Christoph Friedrich, Bertold Freiherr von Haller, Andreas Jakob (Hrsg.): Erlanger Stadtlexikon. W. Tümmels Verlag, Nürnberg 2002, ISBN 3-921590-89-2 (Gesamtausgabe online).
