= Danzer =

Danzer or Dänzer is a surname. Notable people with the name include:

- Emmerich Danzer (born 1944), Austrian figure skater
- Frieda Dänzer (1930–2015), Swiss alpine skier
- Georg Danzer (1946–2007), Austrian singer-songwriter
- George Danzer (born 1983), German poker player
- Gerald Danzer (born 1938), American historian
- Ludwig Danzer (1927–2011), German geometer

== See also ==
- Denzer (disambiguation)
- Danzer (company)
