= Jongensland =

Playground in Amsterdam, Netherlands

Jongensland (Dutch: “Boysland”) was an experimental, unsupervised adventure playground in Amsterdam built in the aftermath of World War II as an attempt by urban planners and child psychologists to undo fascist ideas of child development. Built in 1948 on an island that was only accessible by rowboat, Jongensland allowed boys and girls to construct structures and play without adult supervision. In 1980, it was relocated and renamed to Jeugdland ("Youthland"), and over time it has adopted adult attendants and organized activities.

== History ==
In 1943, Danish architect Carl Theodor Sørensen observed that children in Copenhagen were more fascinated by piles of junk than by playgrounds, and began to create "adventure playgrounds". Adventure playgrounds spread across Europe.

Jongensland was established by a private foundation on an island in eastern Amsterdam, designed boys and girls from age 18 months to 18 years. The playground was self-contained, and accessible only by rowing a boat across a canal. Resembling a junkyard, it was largely free of adults except for a retired police officer known as "Mr. Vlaanderen" who sat in a hut and rarely intervened. Mr. Vlaanderen provided discarded wood and scrap materials for children to hammer into ramshackle structures, which were continually destroyed and rebuilt. Children operated Jongensland like a sort of village, and were permitted to burn fires, cook food, hold boat races, and look after goats, chickens, cats, and rabbits. A newspaper reported in 1973 that Jongensland received 200 visitors even rainy days.

In 1969, photographer Ursula Schulz-Dornburg captured what she described as its "seemingly rule-free, commune-esque state". Images in her photo book Huts, Temples, Castles (Mack, 2022) depicts the children's complex wooden huts and radical play, such as a scene of boys playing on a rope swing next to a burning wood pallet. She described Jongensland as a "place that allowed change, all kinds of change" that was "all about the freedom to be oneself".

In 1980, Jongensland was relocated due to the construction of a ring road in the area. It was renamed from Jongensland (meaning "Boysland") to Jeugdland ("youthland") to reflect the inclusion of girls. Over time it has abandoned its initial ideals and radical freedom, and adult attendants now provide organized programming and enforce public safety in the playground.
