= Roger Hart =

American writer and academic

- Born: {Birth date); Rustington, Sussex, England
- Education: University of Hull, England (BA, Geography). Clark University, Worcester, Massachusetts (MA and PhD in Geography),
- Occupation: Retired Professor
- Years active: University Professor (1976 - 2022)
- Website: www.gc.cuny.edu/people/roger-hart

Roger A. Hart (born 1950, Sussex, England) is a retired child-rights academic, and former Professor of Psychology and Geography at the City University of New York and Co-Director of the Children's Environments Research Group.

== Education ==
Hart received a B.A. in Geography from the University of Hull in England in 1968 and undertook a Masters and PhD in Geography at Clark University in Worcester, Massachusetts.

== Teaching ==
Hart was editor of Childhood City Quarterly for ten years and is on the advisory boards of Child magazine, the Child Development Institute at Sarah Lawrence College, and the Children’s Garden Programs of the American Horticultural Society. He has also taught at UCLA and the Université de Montréal. Roger Hart is the former Director of the Center for Human Environments and the Children’s Environments Research Group at the Graduate Center of the City University of New York.

== Research ==
Hart's research has focused on understanding the everyday lives of children and youth and, to this end, he has designed many participatory methodologies for working with young people. He has collaborated with others in the application of theory and research to the planning and design of children's environments and to environmental education.

In recent years, his work has been more broadly concerned with finding ways to foster the participation of disadvantaged children in fulfilling their rights. To this end, he has collaborated in numerous countries with international non-governmental agencies. With UNICEF, he has written 2 books on children's participation and co-authored “Cities for Children: Children’s Rights, Poverty and Urban Management”. With Save the Children Alliance, he has written “The Children’s Clubs of Nepal: A Democratic Experiment” and the video “Mirrors of Ourselves: Tools of Democratic Self Reflection for Groups of Children and Youth”.

== Bibliography ==
- Children’s Participation: The Theory And Practice Of Involving Young Citizens In Community Development and Environmental Care. New York: UNICEF, and London: Earthscan, 1997 (Also available in Chinese, Japanese and Spanish).
- Cities for Children: Children’s Rights, Poverty and Urban Management (with Bartlett, S., de la Barra, X., Missair, A., and Satterthwaite, D.). New York: UNICEF, and London: Earthscan, Summer, 1999.
- Environments for Children: Understanding and Acting on the Environmental Hazards That Threaten Infants, Children and Their Parents. (with Satterthwaite, D., Levy C., Ross D., and Stevens, C.). New York: UNICEF, and London: Earthscan, 1997.
- Children's Participation: from Tokenism to Citizenship. for UNICEF Innocenti Essays, No. 4, UNICEF/International Child Development Centre, Florence, Italy, 1992. Published by the Latin American office of UNICEF as La Participacion de los Niños: de la participacion simbolica a la Participacion Autentica. (Also published by NGOs in French, Turkish, Japanese and Thai).
- Getting in Touch with Play: Creating Play Environments for Children with Visual Impairments. (with Kim Blakely and Maryanne Lang). New York: Lighthouse National Center for Vision and Child Development, 1991.
- Land and Life: A World Geography. (with Harm de Blij and Gerald Danzer). Chicago, IL: Scott-Foresman Publishing Company, 1988.
- Children's Experience of Place: A Developmental Study. New York.: Irvington Publishers (distributed by Halstead/Wiley Press), 1978. (reviews in Science, Geographical Review, and Contemporary Psychology).

== See also ==
- Child and Youth participation
- Children's rights
- UNICEF
