= Hans Dragehjelm =

Danish educator (1875–1948)

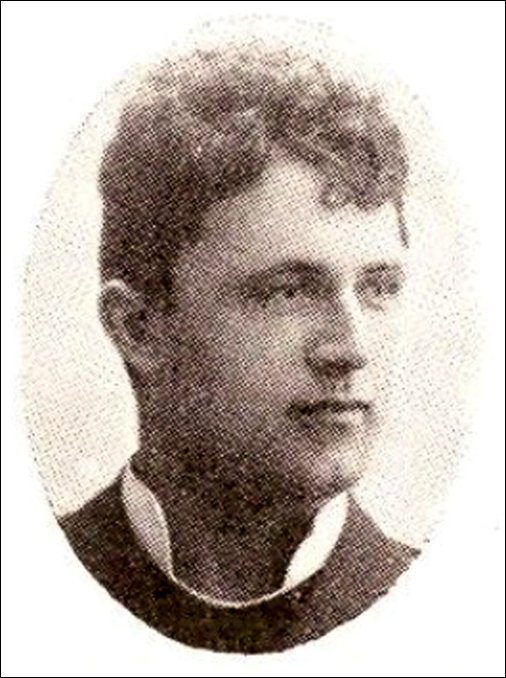
- Hans Dragehjelm ca 1900.
- Born: Hans Christian Dragehjelm; 17 February 1875; Nykøbing
- Died: 2 April 1948 (aged 73); Copenhagen
- Occupation: Teacher
- Known for: Introducing the sandpit to Denmark
- Awards: Order of the Dannebrog 1938

Hans Dragehjelm (Nykøbing, 17 February 1875 - Copenhagen, 2 April 1948) was a Danish teacher and child educator.

Dragehjelm is known for introducing the sandpit to Denmark in 1908, specifically on a plot of land in Christianshavn in Copenhagen. He also wrote several books and treatises on children's play in sandboxes, and was an advisor to the Ministry of the Interior on the design of playgrounds.

Dragehjelm worked together with landscape architect Carl Theodor Sørensen, and in 1943 they created the first construction playground, Emdrup Junk Playground.
