= Denzer =

Denzer may refer to:

- Denzer, Wisconsin, United States
- Roger Denzer (1871–1949), American baseball player

== See also ==
- Danzer, a surname
