= The Land (adventure playground) =

Adventure playground in Wrexham, Wales

- Interactive map of The Land
- Type: Adventure playground
- Location: Plas Madoc, Wrexham, Wales, UK
- Nearest town: Wrexham
- Area: 3,025 square metres (32,560 sq ft)
- Established: February, 2012
- Open: open Monday, Wednesday, Thursday, Friday and Sunday, opening times vary
- Website: Official website

The Land is a junk playground in Plas Madoc, a housing estate seven miles south of Wrexham, in Wales.

The Land is operated by the Association Of Voluntary Organisations In Wrexham (Avow) and it has been in operation since 2011, providing open access adventure play for children and young people from five to sixteen years old. The playground is staffed by between 6 and 12 playworkers and forms part of a collection of play opportunities offered on the Plas Madoc estate which include ‘Street Play’ and ‘Get Out and Play’.

The Land consists of a fenced, one acre play-area with a brook running through it, "piles of pallets, a tonne of tyres, the odd upside-down boat, wheelbarrows, ladders, fishing nets, various stray hammers ..., ropes and punch bags". The play-area, which had been used by Plas Madoc children prior to the opening of The Land, was set aside for a junk playground with funding from WREN.

The Land was the subject of documentary called The Land, directed by the American filmmaker Erin Davis, who spent a month filming there in 2012.
