= Pop-Up Adventure Play =

American non-profit organization

- Formation: 2011
- Website: popupadventureplay.org

Pop-Up Adventure Play is a not-for-profit play advocacy organization founded in the United States with centres in other countries. It is also a registered charity in the UK.

== History ==
Pop-Up Adventure Play was first founded in the United States with support from Fractured Atlas in order to translate the UK playwork tradition for use in the US. It was later established as a Private company limited by guarantee, and then a charity, in the United Kingdom. Its founding members include Morgan Leichter-Saxby, Suzanna Law, Sharon Unis, Anna Housley Juster, Daniel Bigler and Erin Davis. Pop-up Adventure play held its first pop-up adventure playground in New York City in 2010. There have since been over 300 Pop-Ups in more than 25 countries.

== Programs ==
Pop-Up Adventure Play advocates for "child-directed, open-ended play," hosts pop-up adventure playgrounds, provides Playwork training and pop-up play support and free resources to other play organizations worldwide.

Pop-Up Adventure Play has held pop-ups in McCarren Park, in Brooklyn, Central Park and other parks in New York City, Northampton, Massachusetts, Port Clinton, Ohio, Largo, Florida, Santa Clarita, California, Missoula, Montana, and elsewhere. Pop-Up Adventure Play also opened a free "Pop-Up Play Shop" in Cardiff, Wales, where children could play with recycled materials.

== See also ==
- Adventure playground
- Playwork
