= Ravenscliffe, West Yorkshire =

Housing estate in Bradford, West Yorkshire, England

Coordinates: 53.819°N 1.712°W

Ravenscliffe
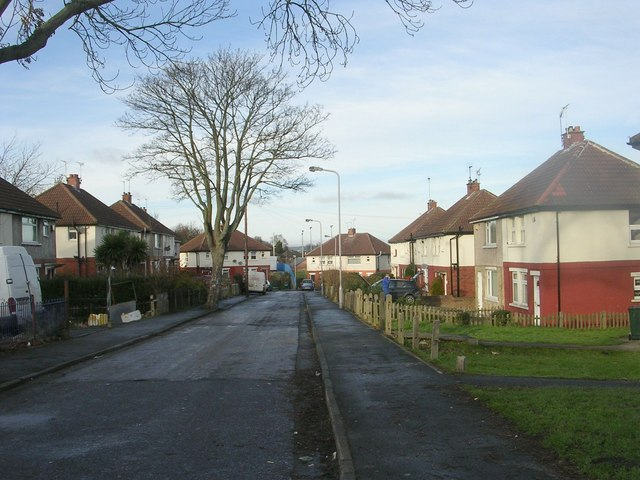
- Barham Terrace, a typical street in Ravenscliffe

- Location within West Yorkshire
- Metropolitan borough: Bradford
- Metropolitan county: West Yorkshire
- Region: Yorkshire and the Humber
- Country: England
- Sovereign state: United Kingdom
- Police: West Yorkshire
- Fire: West Yorkshire
- Ambulance: Yorkshire

Ravenscliffe is a housing estate in the Eccleshill ward of the Bradford district, in the English county of West Yorkshire. Ravenscliffe is located to the west of Fagley Beck and to the east of the A658 Harrogate Road. The buildings that were Ravenscliff farmhouse are situated off to the south in Fagley while Ravenscliffe Woods are in Pudsey to the south-east. On 10 July 2001, Ravenscliffe was subject to rioting on the estate, this was just after the Manningham riots. Now, Ravenscliffe has a large newly built housing development, two shops and an Indian takeaway. The Gateway centre which is adjacent to the shops, as a pre-school nursery and the centre also helps the disadvantaged, elderly and vulnerable tenants of the community.

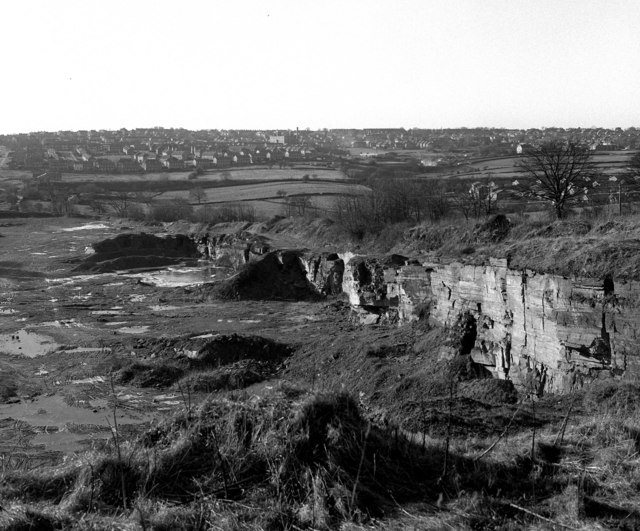
View towards Ravenscliffe Estate across the former Woodhall Quarries

== Landmarks ==
On Harrogate Road can be found Eccleshill Swimming Pool, a public house, Holybrook Primary School playing fields, the clubhouse of Eccleshill Sports and Social Club and Victoria Park sports ground where Victoria Rangers play rugby football (inactive) East of the playing fields is the Eccleshill Community Hospital and Eccleshill Park—an area of grassland and the Eccleshill Adventure Playground. In the middle of Ravenscliffe is a sub post office and The Gateway Community and Children's Centre. To the north Ravenscliffe merges with Greengates.
