= The Yard (adventure playground) =

Children's play area in Minneapolis, Minnesota (1949–1950)

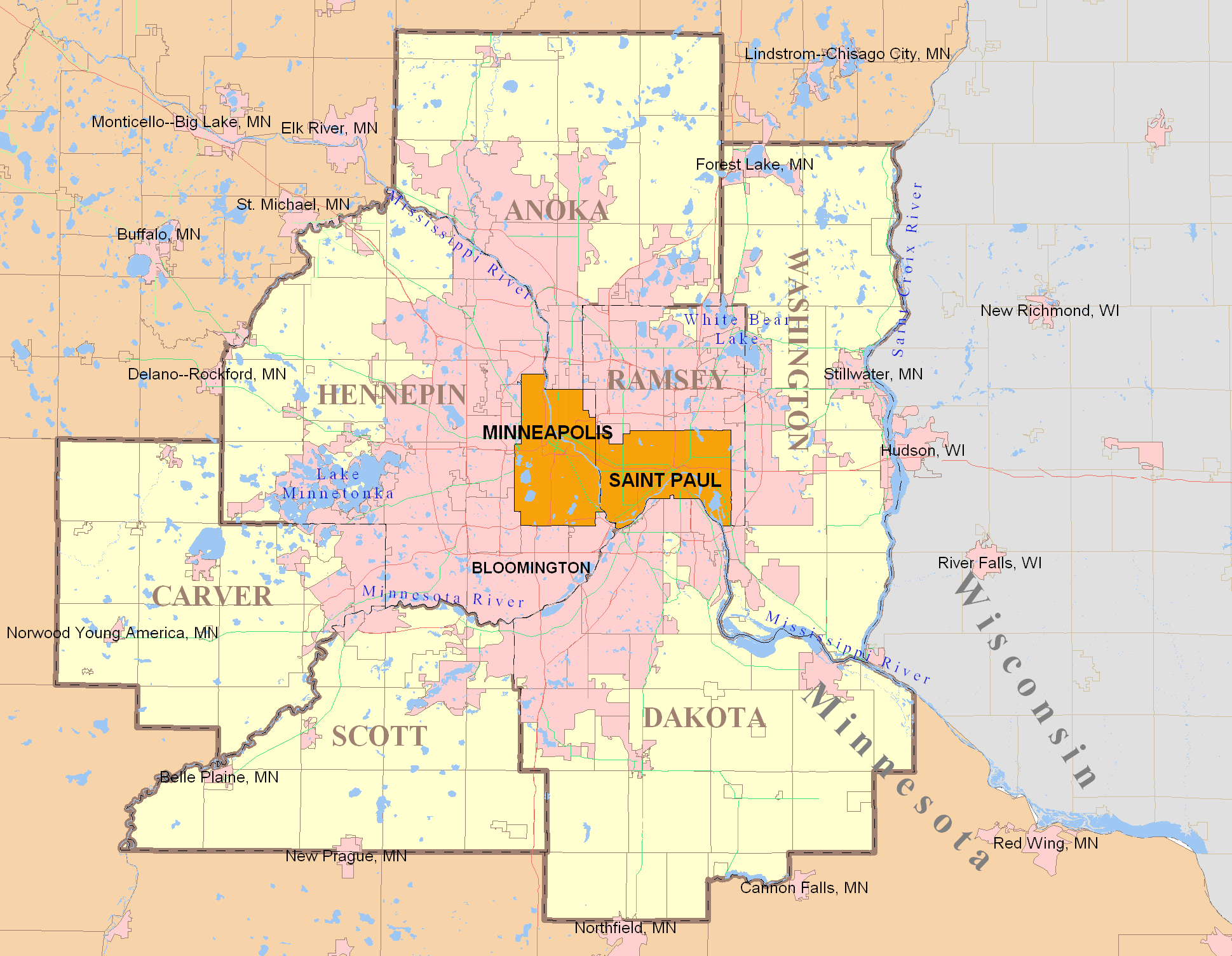
- Location within Minneapolis–Saint Paul
- Type: Adventure playground
- Nearest city: Minneapolis
- Coordinates: 45.030470°N 93.241690°W
- Created: 1949
- Closed: c. 1950

The Yard (also called 'Young Yardville' or 'Yardville') was the first adventure playground established in the United States. It was opened in Minneapolis, Minnesota, in 1949, to give children "their own spot of earth and plenty of tools and materials for digging, building and creating as they see fit."

== History ==
McCall’s Magazine, together with the United Way and several local organizations, sponsored the construction of the playground in 1949. President Harry Truman visited the site in 1949. It was popular with children and police: "'Since President Truman visited The Yard last fall, we haven't had a call out that way,' says Juvenile Officer Virgil Lenens of the Minneapolis Police Department. 'It used to be a headache, with the kids breaking street lamps and picking up stuff from houses under construction to build their shacks along the railroad tracks.'"

The Yard was equipped with tools for digging and building, second-hand lumber, bricks, tiling, paint, nails, an old railroad boxcar, and the body of a milk truck.
