= Oval, London =

Coordinates: 51.4813°N 0.1197°W

Oval
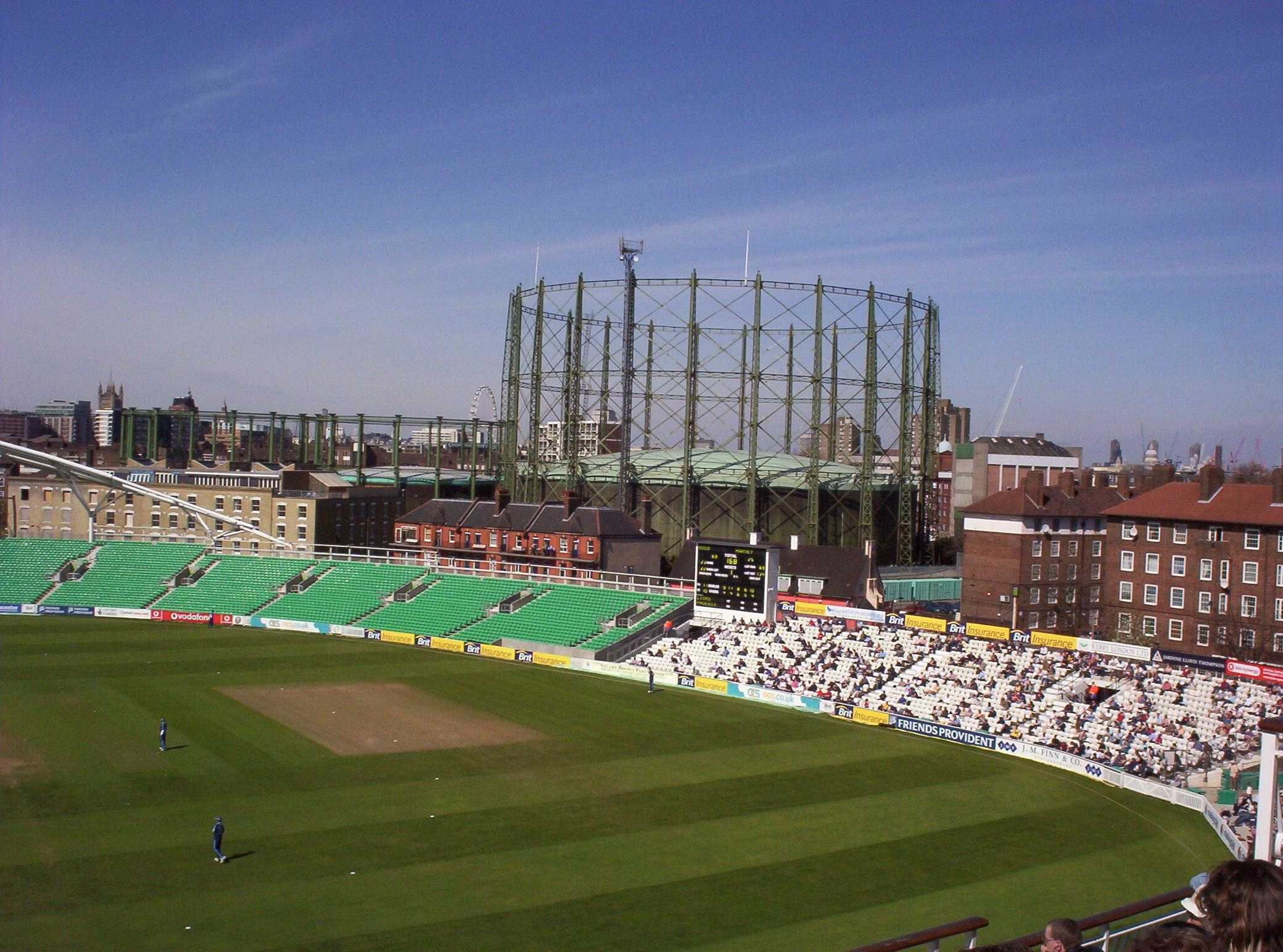
- The area is known for The Oval cricket ground.

- Location within Greater London
- Population: 15,106 (2011 Census.Ward)
- OS grid reference: TQ305775
- London borough: Lambeth
- Ceremonial county: Greater London
- Region: London
- Country: England
- Sovereign state: United Kingdom
- Post town: LONDON
- Postcode district: SE11
- Postcode district: SW8, SW9
- Dialling code: 020
- Police: Metropolitan
- Fire: London
- Ambulance: London
- UK Parliament: Vauxhall and Camberwell Green
- London Assembly: Lambeth and Southwark

Oval is an area in south London, in the London Borough of Lambeth. It is the part of Kennington around The Oval cricket ground, situated 2.1 miles (3.38 km) to the southeast of Charing Cross.

== History ==
The land here was, from the seventeenth century, used for a market garden. The name "Oval" emerged from a street layout which was originated in 1790 but never completely built. The Montpelier Cricket Club leased ten acres of land from the Duchy of Cornwall in 1844, and Surrey County Cricket Club was formed soon thereafter at a meeting at the Horns Tavern (since demolished) on Kennington Park Road.

== Governance ==
The Oval ward of the London Borough of Lambeth includes part of Kennington and some of the River Thames. It is in the Vauxhall and Camberwell Green parliamentary constituency, represented in Parliament by Florence Eshalomi of the Labour Party.

== Geography ==
Oval is part of Kennington. It is 2.1 miles (3.38 km) to the southeast of Charing Cross in central London. It straddles the border of south-west London and south-east London, and is where the postcode SE11 converges with the postcodes SW8 and SW9.

== Demography ==
In 2001, the National Census recorded a population of 11,983 for Oval.

== Transport ==
The nearest tube stations are Oval, Kennington, Stockwell and Vauxhall.
