= Sandpit =

Playing area for children

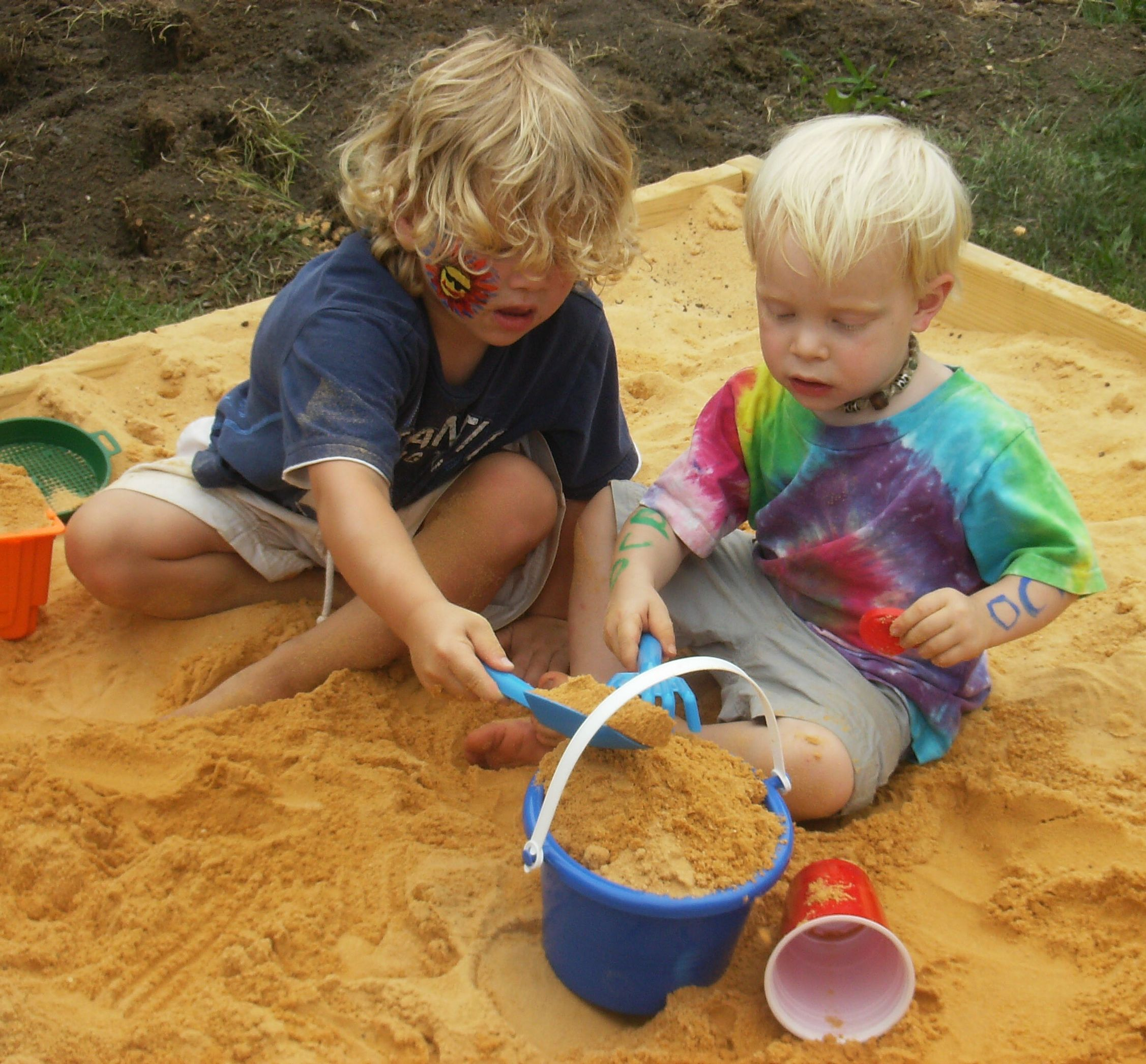
Children play in a communal sandbox

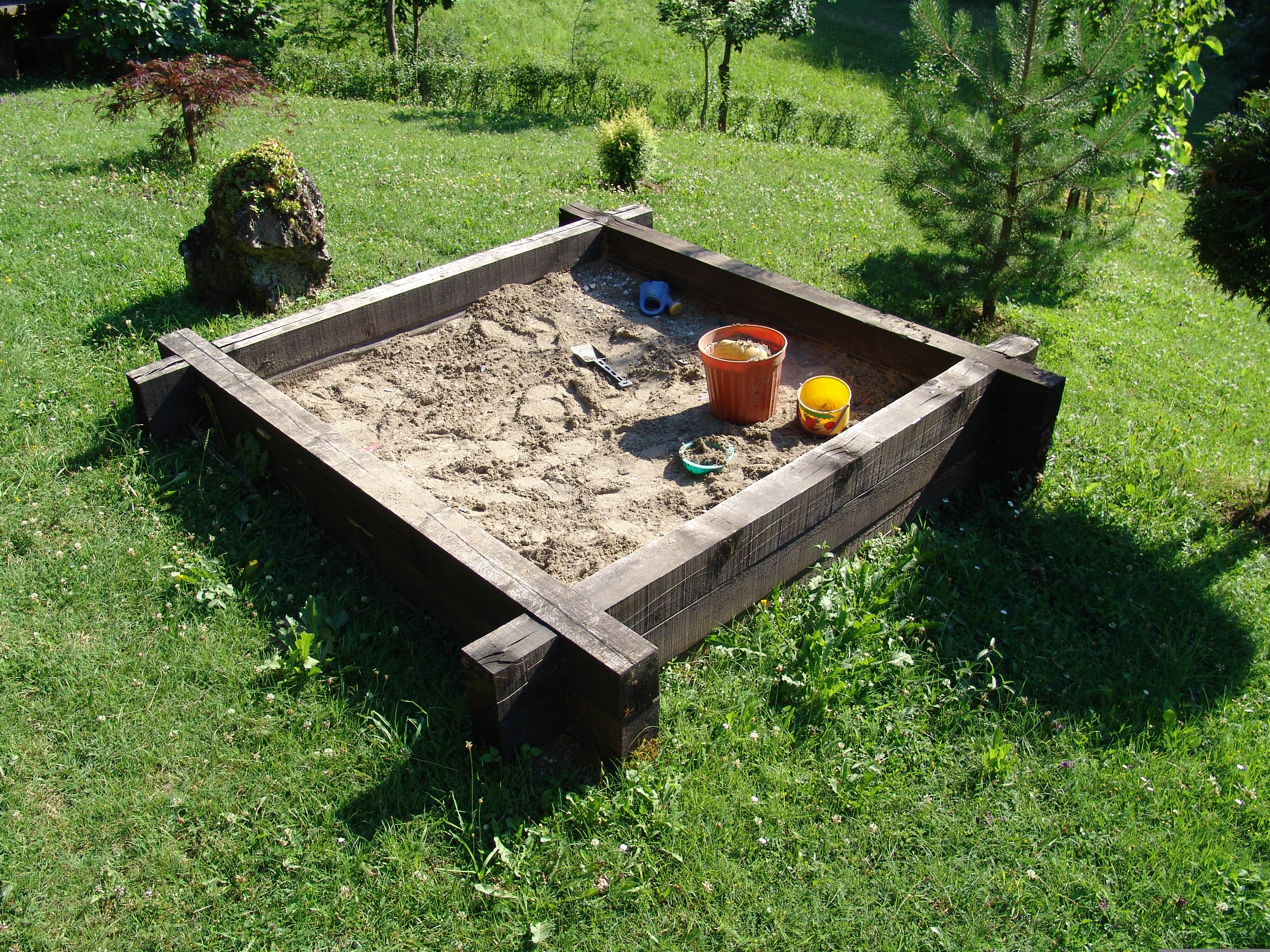
Sandpit with toy tools used by children to play in sand

A sandpit (most Commonwealth countries) or sandbox (US and Canada) is a low, wide container or shallow depression filled with soft (beach) sand in which children can play. Sharp sand (as used in the building industry) is not suitable for such use. Many homeowners with children build sandpits in their backyards because, unlike most playground equipment, they can be easily and cheaply constructed.

== History ==
German sand gardens were the first organization of children's play in public spaces. The German "sand gardens" were an 1850 offshoot of Friedrich Fröbel's work on kindergartens. Sand gardens were introduced to America by Marie Elizabeth Zakrzewska, starting in her home city of Boston, inspired by the German sand gardens she observed while visiting Berlin in the summer of 1885. Joseph Lee from Boston is considered the "founder of the playground movement".

== Physical description ==
The "pit" or "box" itself is simply a container for storing the sand (or other material) so that it does not spread across surrounding surfaces. They sometimes have lids to cover the sand when not in use. The use of actual sand can be a health risk, such as ringworm, which can be introduced by animals.

== See also ==
- Hans Dragehjelm
- Borrow pit
- Japanese rock garden
- Outdoor playset
- Sand art and play
