= Gerald Danzer =

American historian (born 1938)

- Born: Gerald A. Danzer; November 9, 1938 (age 87)
- Education: Northwestern University (PhD)
- Occupation: Historian

Gerald A. Danzer (born November 9, 1938) is professor emeritus of history at the University of Illinois Chicago. He is a specialist in historical geography, world history, and the use of old maps as historical sources.

== Early life ==
Gerald Danzer was born on November 9, 1938. He received his PhD from Northwestern University in 1967 for a dissertation on the subject of "America's Roots in the Past: Historical Publication in America to 1860".

== Career ==
Danzer is professor emeritus of history at the University of Illinois Chicago where he has taught an MA program for teachers of history for over thirty years. He is a specialist in historical geography, world history, and the use of old maps as historical sources. He is a former director of the Chicago Neighborhood History Project.

== Selected publications ==
=== 1980s ===
- People Space and Time. The Chicago Neighborhood History Project: An Introduction to Community History for Schools. University Press Of America, 1986. (Joint author) ISBN 0819152226
- Public Places: Exploring Their History. Altamira Press, 1987. ISBN 0761989315

=== 1990s ===
- Discovering Western Civilization Through Maps and Views. Harper Collins, 1991. (With David Buisseret) ISBN 0673535967
- Mapping World History: A Guide for Beginning Students. Harper Collins, 1992. ISBN 0065005600
- The Americans. McDougal Littell, Evanston, 1998. (Multiple later and variant editions) ISBN 0395851823
- World History: An Atlas and Study Guide. Prentice Hall, 1998. ISBN 0130953822

=== 2000s ===
- An Atlas of World History. Borders Press, 2000. ISBN 0681465727
- The Americans: Reconstruction to the 21st Century. McDougal Littell, Evanston, 2003.
- Maps in Context: A Workbook for American History, Volume I. Bedford/St. Martin's, 2004. ISBN 978-0312434816
- Maps in Context: A Workbook for American History, Volume II. Bedford/St. Martin's, 2004. ISBN 978-0312434823
- Chicago's Historic Maps: Resources for Understanding the City. Illinois Historic Preservation Agency, Springfield, 2007. ISBN 9780942579253
- Illinois: A History in Pictures. University of Illinois Press, 2011. ISBN 978-0252032882
- The World's Columbian Exposition, 1893: Reconstructing the Geography of Chicago's World's Fair by way of a Fire Insurance Atlas. Privately printed, Chicago, 2014.
