= Marjory Allen, Baroness Allen of Hurtwood =

British landscape architect (1897–1976)

The Right Honourable The Lady Allen of Hurtwood JP
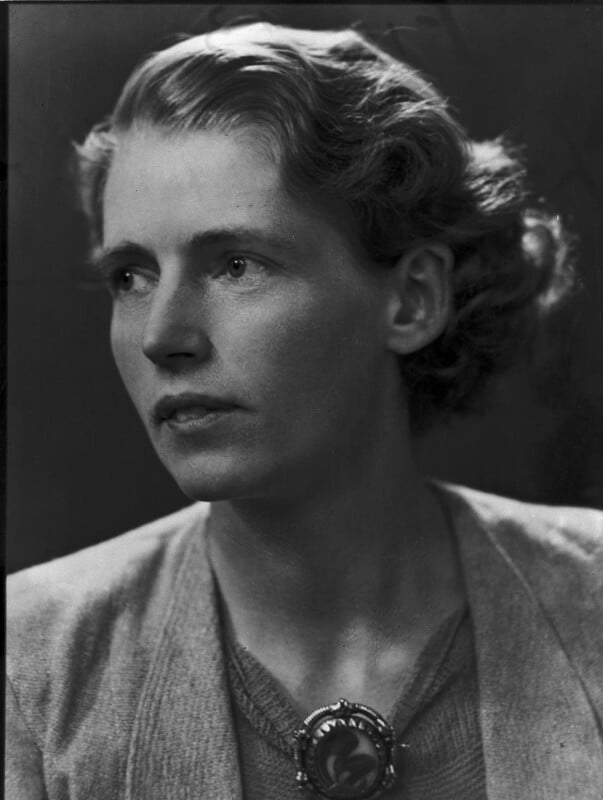
- Allen in 1942
- Born: Marjory Gill; 10 May 1897; Bexleyheath, Kent, England
- Died: 11 April 1976 (aged 78)
- Other name: Joan Allen
- Occupations: Landscape architect, child welfare campaigner

Marjory Allen, Baroness Allen of Hurtwood (née Gill; 10 May 1897 – 11 April 1976), known to her friends as Joan, was an English landscape architect and promoter of child welfare.

== Early life and education ==
Marjory Gill was born in Bexleyheath, Kent. Her brother was Colin Gill and her cousin was Eric Gill. She was educated at Bedales School and University College, Reading, where she took a diploma course in horticulture. In 1921 she married Clifford Allen, a leading member of the Independent Labour Party who had been imprisoned as a conscientious objector in World War I.

== Career ==
Marjory Allen worked as a landscape architect throughout the 1920s and 1930s and was elected the first fellow of the Institute of Landscape Architects in 1930.

Clifford Allen, who had been created 1st Baron Allen of Hurtwood in 1932, died in 1939, and Lady Allen threw herself into her work, also becoming interested in the welfare of children. Her campaigning for children in institutional care led to the passing of the Children Act 1948. She was chairman (1942–1948) and president (1948–1951) of the Nursery School Association of Great Britain, founder president of the World Organisation for Early Childhood Education, a member of the Central Advisory Council for Education (1945–1949), and chairman of the Advisory Council on Children's Entertainment Films (1944–1950). During the Second World War, Lady Allen, with the support of the Home Secretary, Herbert Morrison, with whom she was friends, established a scheme whereby waste material from the bomb sites were turned into children's toys. After World War II she served as a liaison officer with UNICEF in Europe and the Middle East.

She campaigned for facilities for children growing up in the new high-rise developments in Britain's cities and wrote a series of illustrated books on the subject of playgrounds, and at least one book on adventure playgrounds, spaces for free creativity by children, which helped the idea spread worldwide.

== Works ==
- Triangle Adventure Playground
- Lollard Street Adventure Playground

=== Books ===
- Design for play... the youngest children (1963, published by the Housing Centre Trust)
- Play parks (1964, published by The Housing Centre)
- Planning for play (1971, ISBN 9780500010471, 0500010471)
- Memoirs of an uneducated lady (1975, ISBN 9780500011331, 0500011338 )

== Commemoration ==
In May 2024, a blue plaque was unveiled in Marjory Allen's honour, on the site of her home between 1958 and 1966 at 22 Lawrence Street, Chelsea, London.
