= Carl Theodor Sørensen =

Danish landscape architect

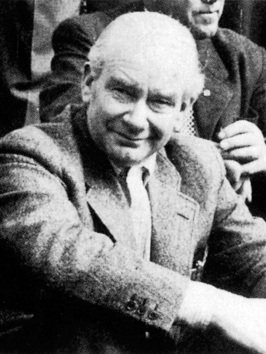
- Carl Theodor Sørensen in 1949
- Born: Søren Carl Theodor Marius Sørensen; 24 July 1893; Altona, Hamburg, Germany
- Died: 12 September 1979 (aged 86); Copenhagen, Denmark
- Occupations: Landscape architect; Author; Professor of landscape architecture

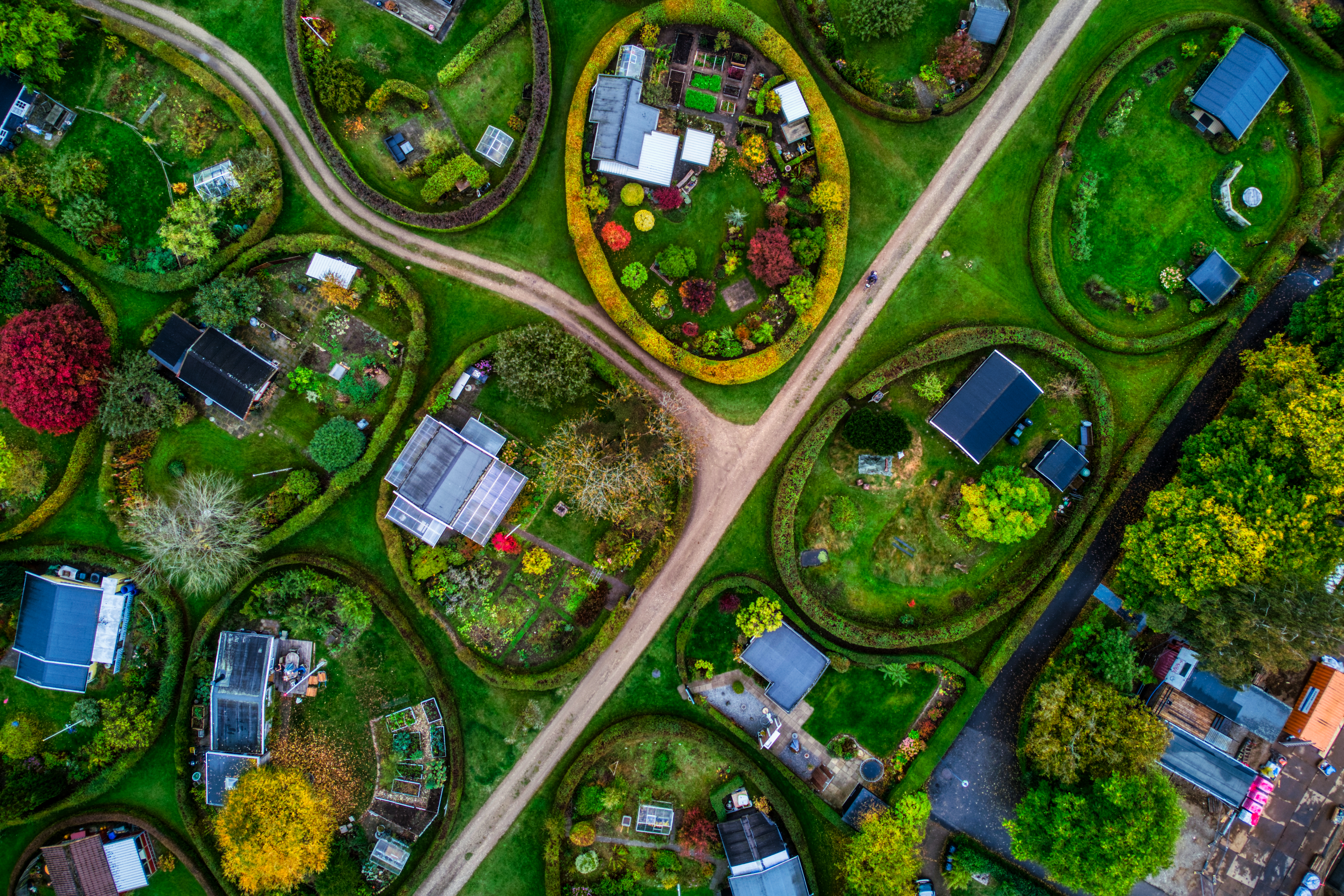
The Oval Allotment Gardens, Nærum, Denmark

Søren Carl Theodor Marius Sørensen (24 July 1893 in Altona, Hamburg, Germany – 12 September 1979 in Copenhagen, Denmark) was a Danish landscape architect who is considered to be one of the greatest landscape architects of the 20th century. A contemporary of Thomas Church, Geoffrey Jellicoe and Luis Barragán he was a leading figure in the first generation of Modernists in landscape design. He is best known for designing the first adventure playground, in partnership with Hans Dragehjelm, in Emdrup, Copenhagen.

== Career ==
Sørensen was a prolific author producing eight books, editing two volumes and writing hundreds of articles. Only one short book has been translated into English and another into German and Dutch. His books cover open space in urban life, horticulture, the history of garden art, principles of garden design, as well as education and autobiography.

Sørensen worked with Copenhagen schoolteacher Hans Dragehjelm (1875–1948) on the first ever adventure playground in Emdrup, a district of the Danish capital Copenhagen in 1940. Photos from the time show children playing with bricks, digging in the mud and building dens with wood and nails. In his book Parkipolitik i Sogn og Købstad (Park Politics in the parish and market town), Sørensen stated his belief that "children's playgrounds are the city's most important form of public plantation". He believed children needed sun and open space to play in and hated the trend for dark, shady courtyards as play spaces. He called them skrammellegepladser ("junk playgrounds").

His designs reflected the Modernist movement and include strong geometric shapes and graceful landforms.

He started teaching at the Royal Danish Academy of Fine Arts in Copenhagen in 1940 and was professor of landscape architecture there from 1954 to 1963. He was awarded the Eckersberg Medal in 1945 and the Prince Eugen Medal in 1972.

== Major Projects ==
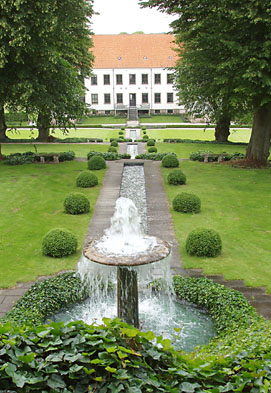
Water-garden, Clausholm Castle

- Eidsvold Værk (garden), Norway
- The Kampmann Garden
- Vitus Berings Park I, Horsens
- Vitus Berings Park II, Horsens
- De Geometriske Haver, Herning (1983)
- Klokkergården
- Høstrup Park
- The Church Plaza, Kalundborg
- Bellahøj Open-air Theatre, Copenhagen
- Aarhus University Park
- The Mølleå Canal, Åbenrå
- Kogenhus Memorial Park, Viborg
- The Golden Chain Garden in Middelfart
- The Sonja Poll Garden (designed for his daughter in 1970), Holte
- The Oval Gardens (allotment gardens), Nærum
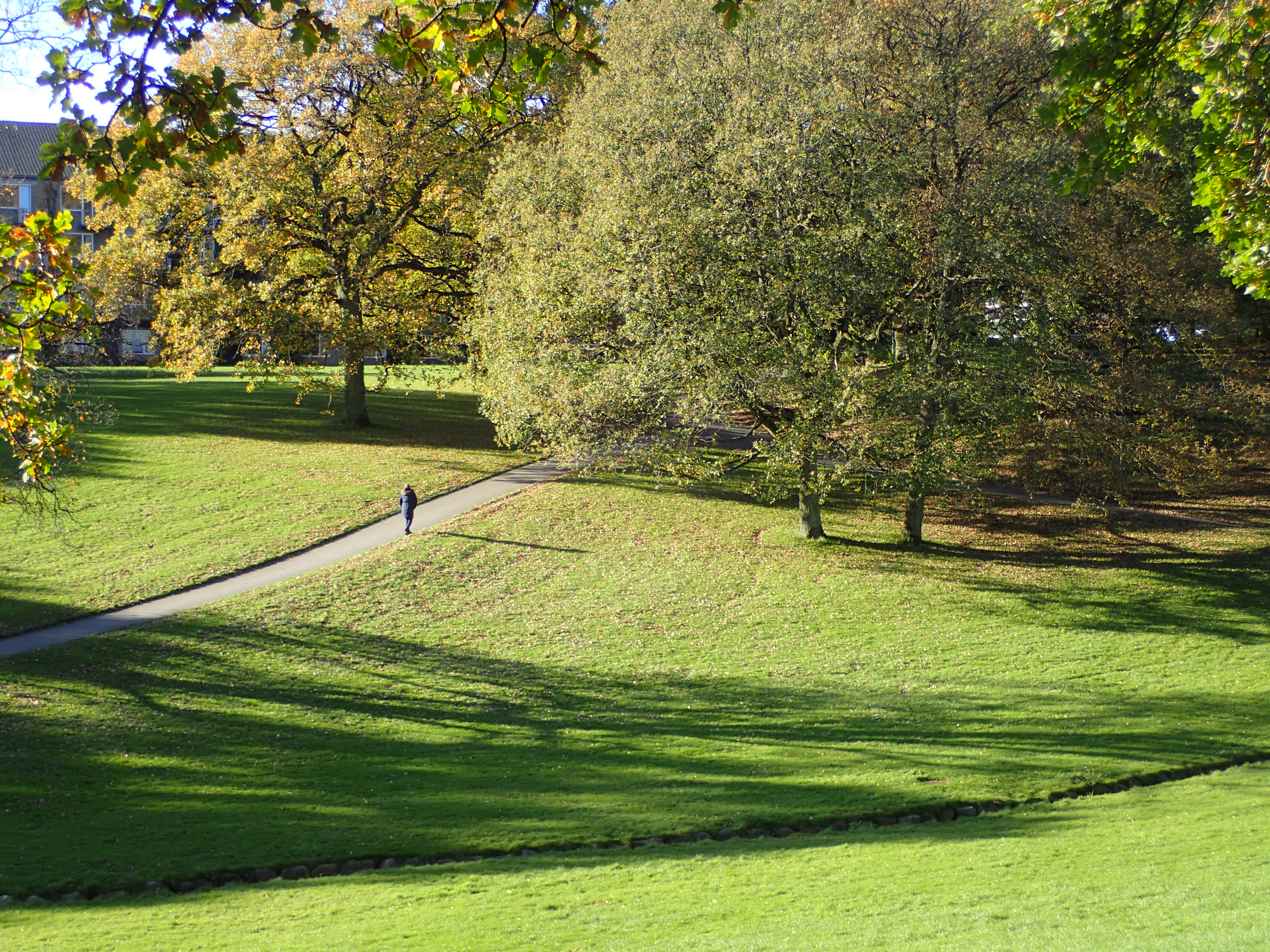
Aarhus University Park

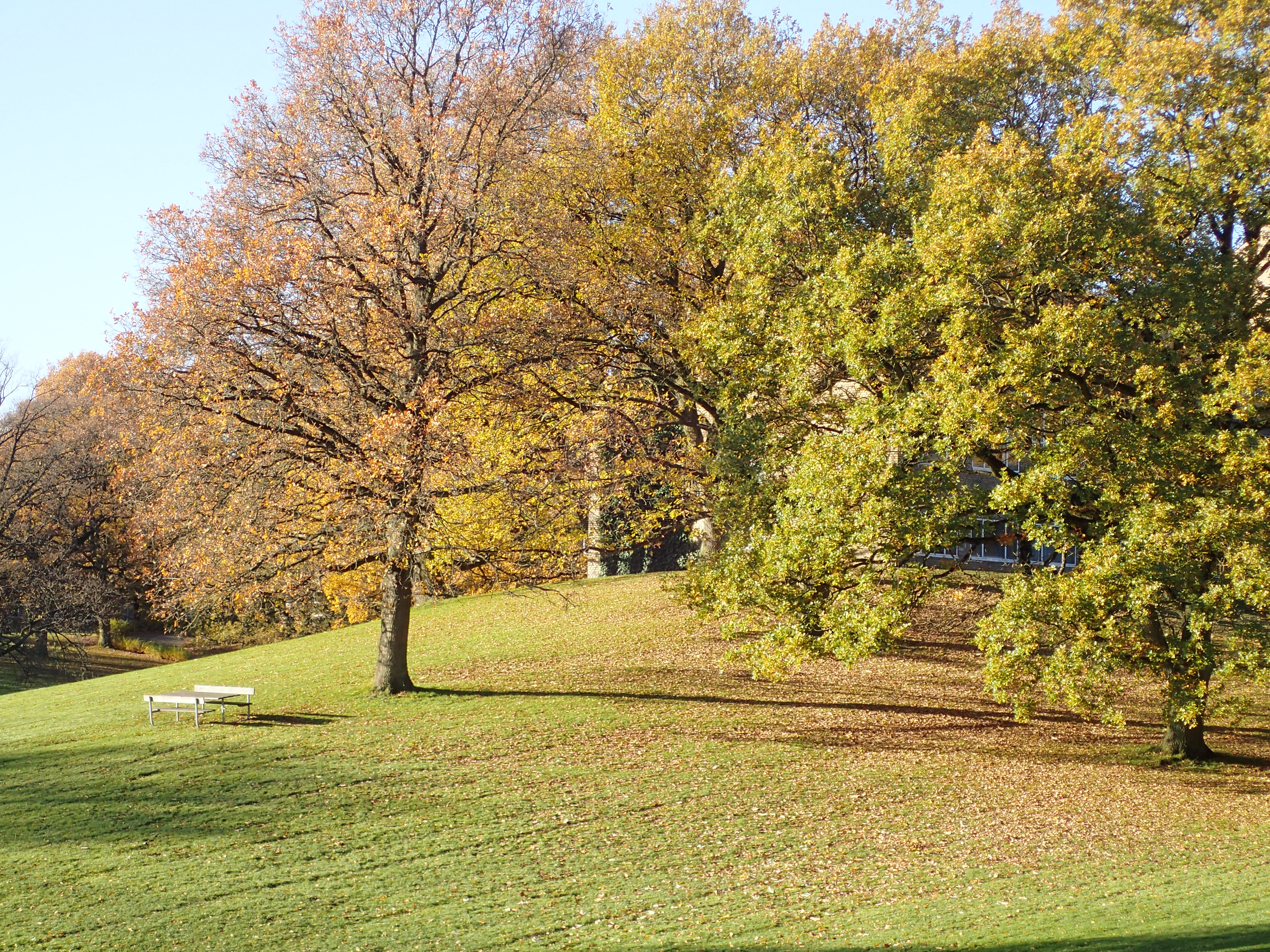
Aarhus University Park

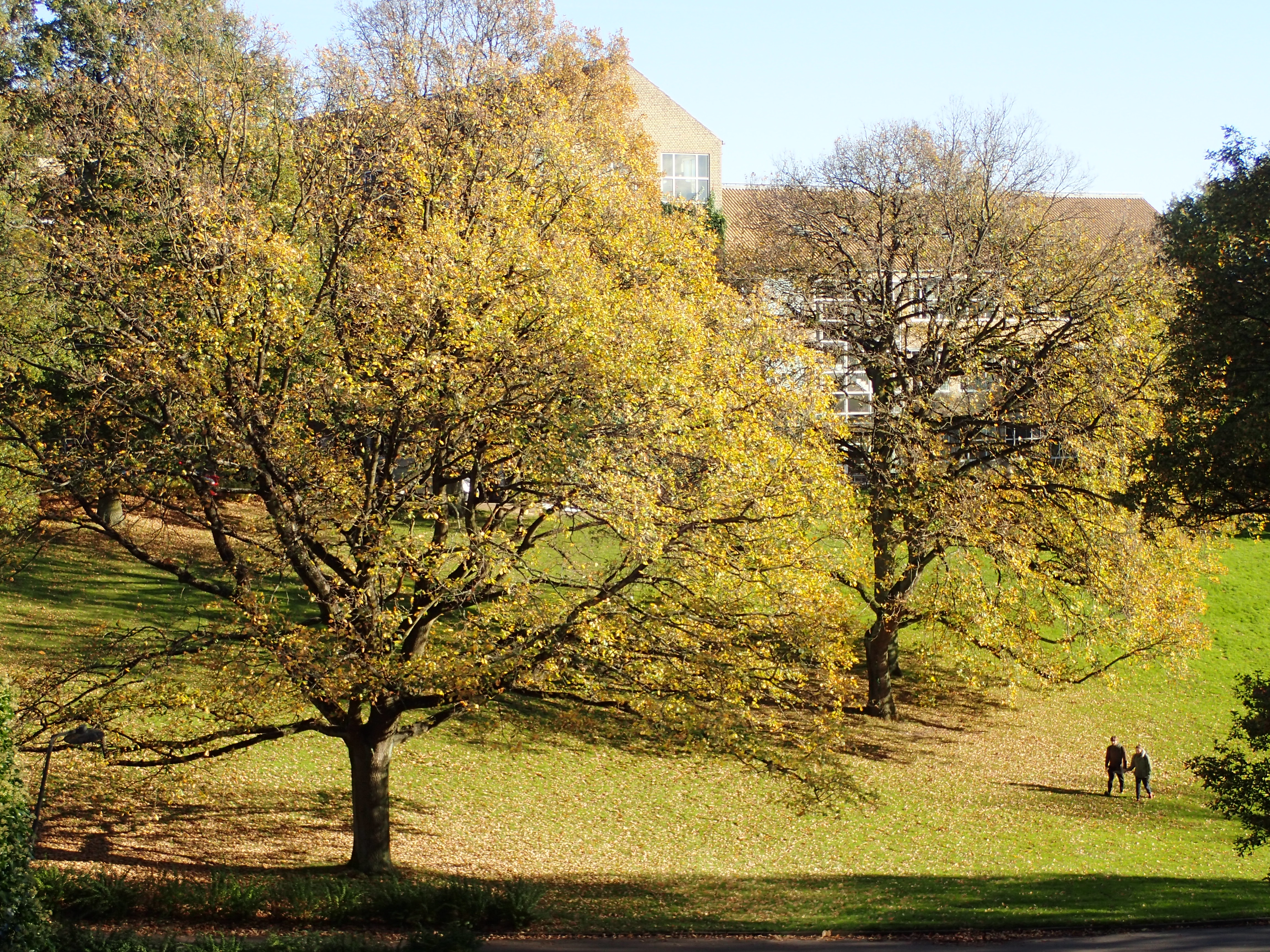
Aarhus University Park

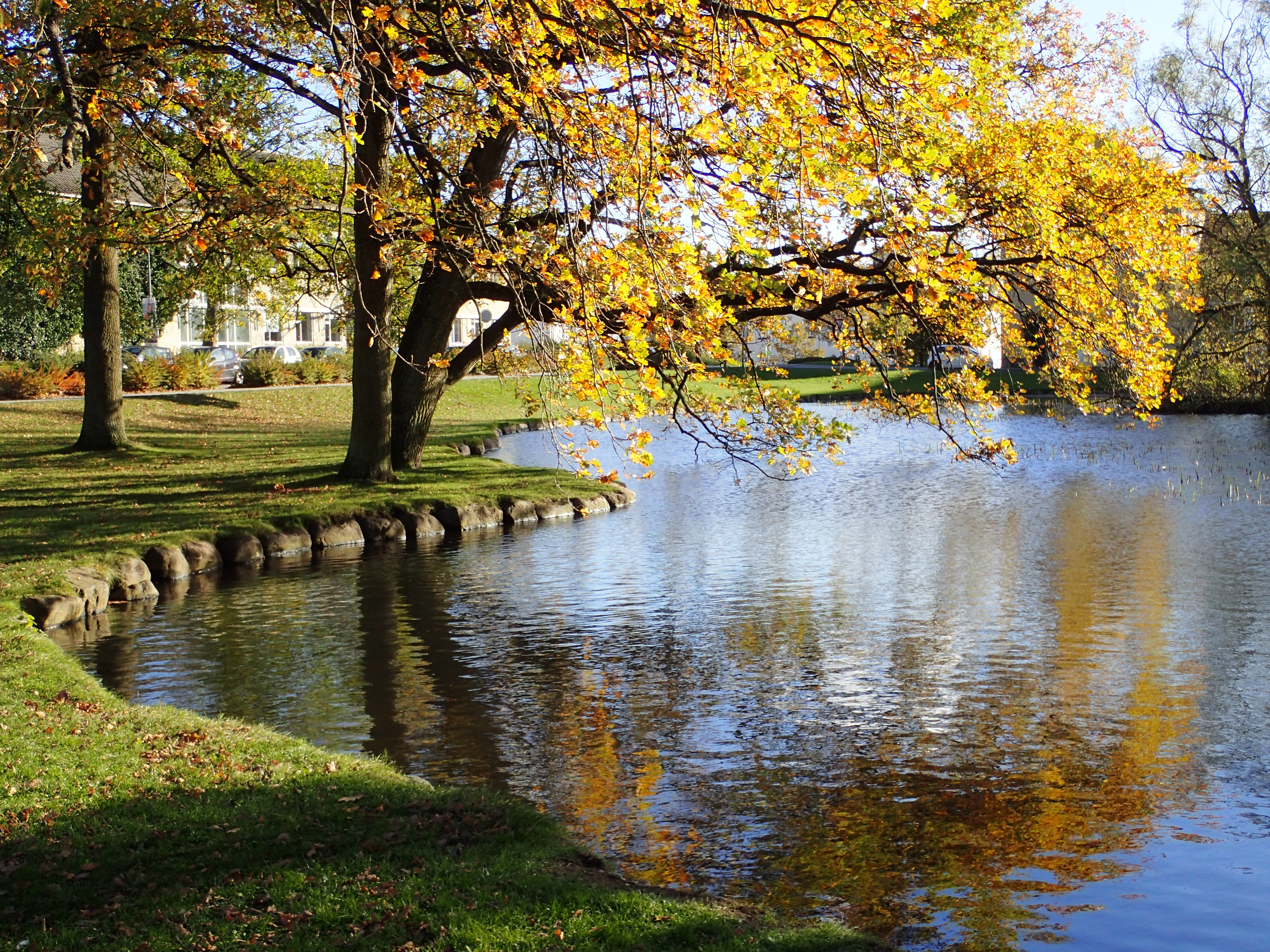
Aarhus University Park (the lakes)

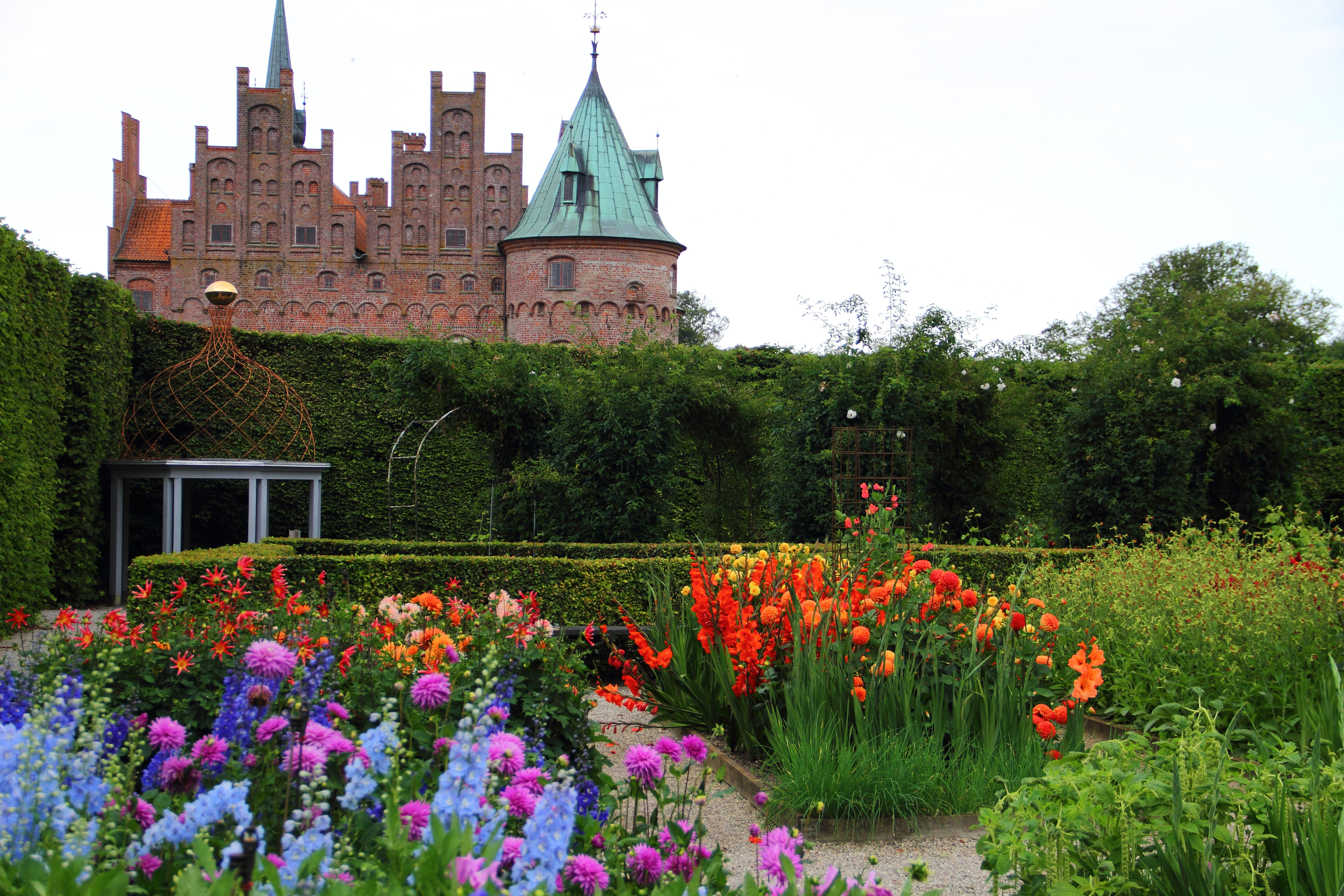
Egeskov Castle Park

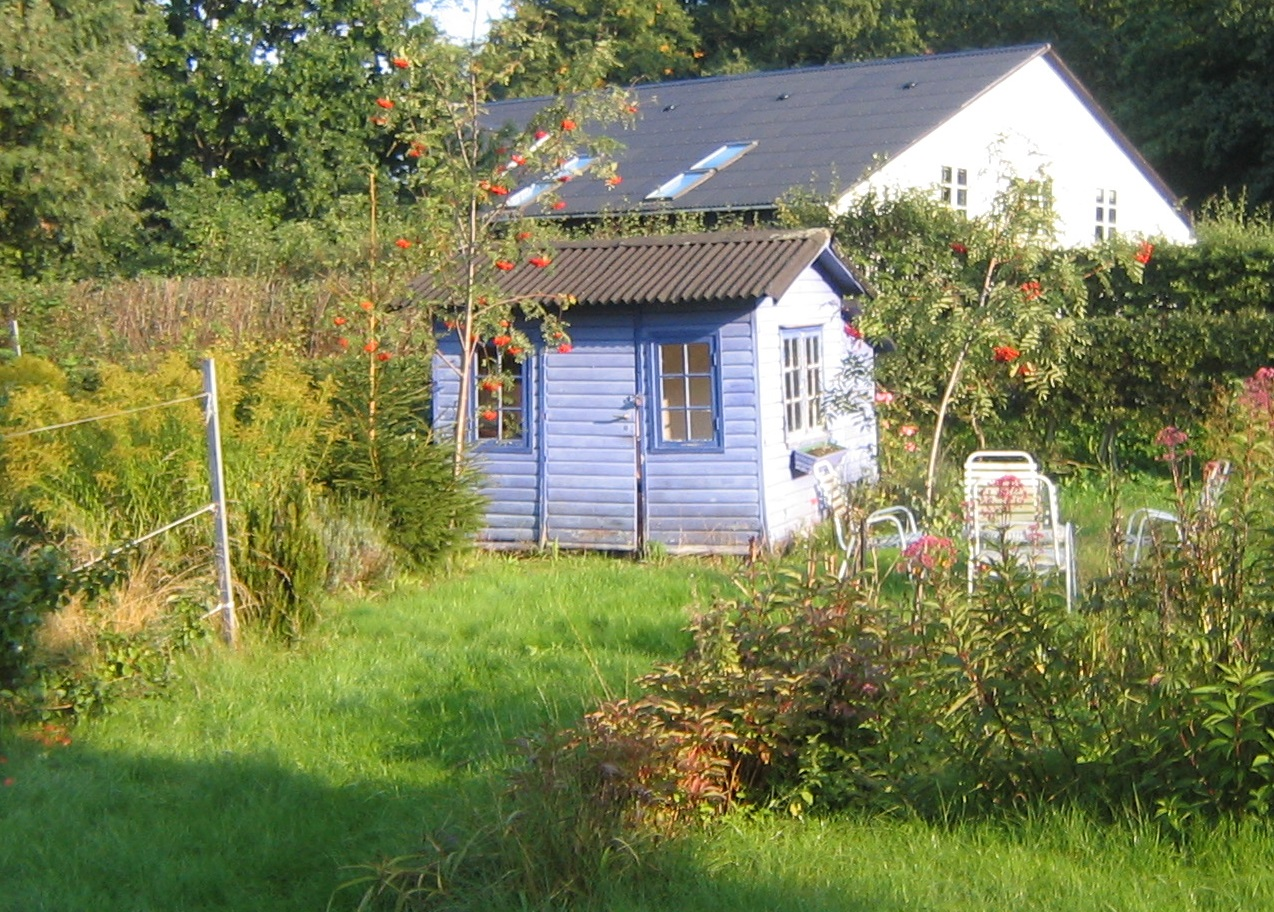
The Oval Allotment Gardens in Nærum.

== Bibliography ==
- Om Indretning af Haver, 1930, 1941 (with P. Wad)
- Parkpolitik i Sogn og Købstad, 1931 (reprint), Copenhagen 1978, ISBN 87-7241-405-7
- Om Haver, 1939
- Buske og Træer, 1948 (edited with Valdemar Jensen and H.K. Paludanred)
- Frilandsblomster, 1949 (edited with Valdemar Jensen and H.K. Paludanred)
- Europas Havekunst fra Alhambra til Liselund, 1959, 1979
- The Origin of Garden Art, 1963 (reissued in: Havekunst, Sophienholm, 1977) (in English)
- 39 Haveplaner. Typiske haver til et typehus, 1966
- Haver. Tanker og arbejder, 1975

== Literature ==
- Andersson, Sven-Ingvar – Hoyer, Steen (2001): C.Th. Sørensen – Landscape Modernist. The Danish Architectural Press. ISBN 87-7407-223-4
