= Playwork =

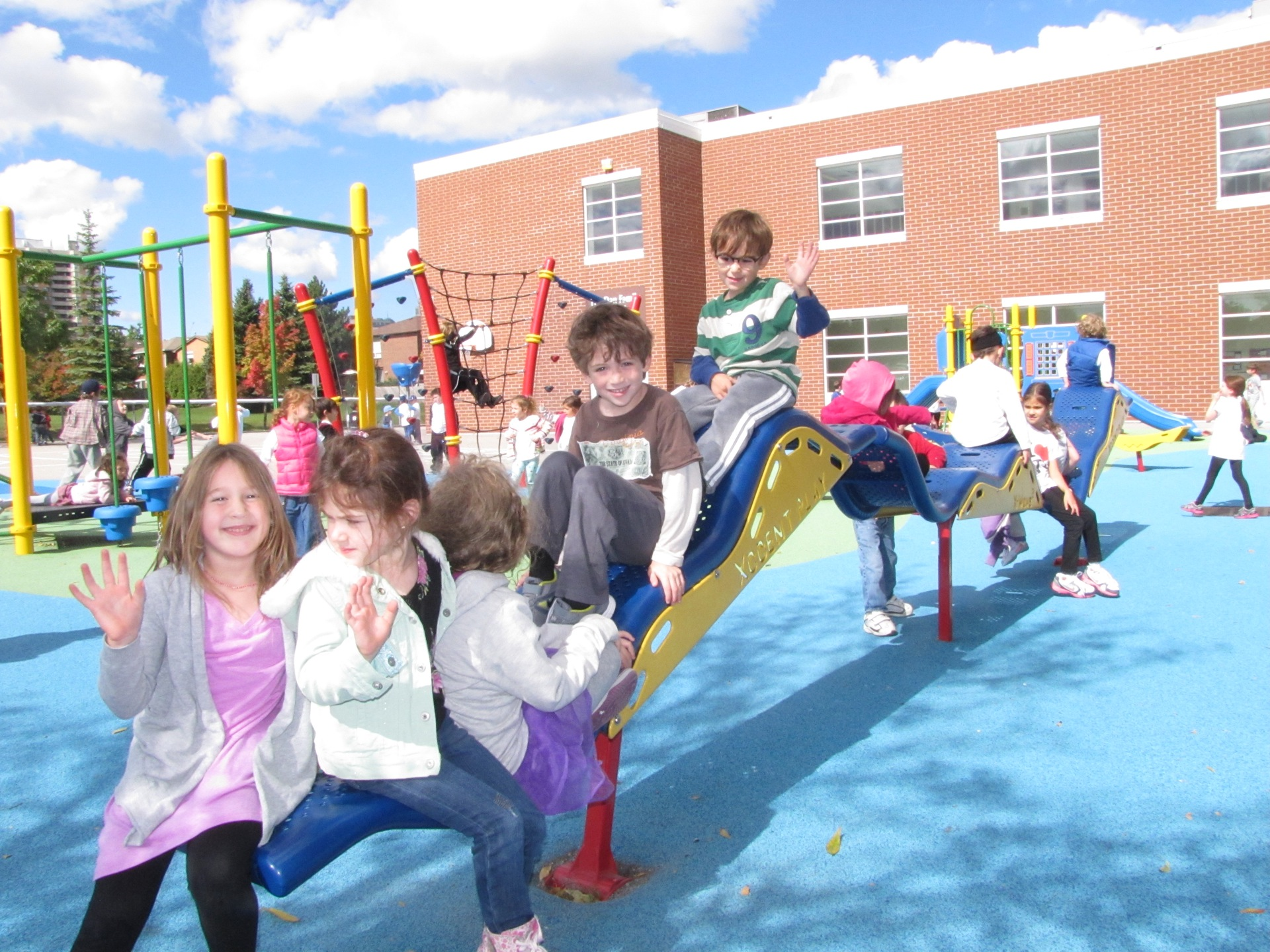
Children playing in playground (2012)

Playwork is the work of creating and maintaining spaces for children to play. The theory and practice of playwork recognises that children's play should ideally be "freely chosen, personally directed and intrinsically motivated."

It is the job of a playworker to ensure that the broadest possible range of play types can be engaged in or accessed by children, and to observe, reflect and analyze the play that is happening and select a mode of intervention or make a change to the play space if needed.

Playwork should not be confused with childcare. A qualification in playwork relates to working with school aged children and should not be confused with qualifications more suited to work in early years or youth work.

== History ==
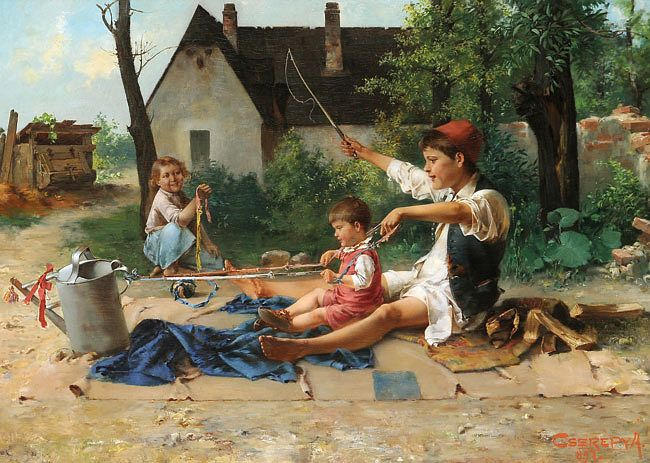
Children playing (1897)

The profession has its roots in the early adventure playground movement which began after Lady Allen of Hurtwood visited a site in Copenhagen during the German occupation of the city during World War II. The term and concept of "adventure playground" truly began after she brought the concept back to London. The sites were not typical playgrounds, but rather empty public spaces with a plethora of resources and materials, otherwise mistaken as "junk," for children to build, create, and mold their own environment.

Playwork today has been popularized in mainstream culture by the short documentary, The Land, about an adventure playground in Wrexham, Wales. Non-profits such as Pop-Up Adventure Play host trainings, workshops and open play workshops across the UK, US, and Canada. Playwork can be studied at the graduate school level, specifically in Leeds Beckett University in the UK under Dr. Fraser Brown.

== Play rangers ==
A play ranger is a local government employee who visits parks and outdoor spaces, providing equipment and some guidance to help children enjoy their public spaces more. They have been described as a combination of a park ranger and a playworker. They share some skills and goals in common with staff of a forest kindergarten, but are more focused on play than workers at forest schools.
