= Esther Acklom =

British heiress (1788–1818)

Viscountess Althorp
- Known for: Socialite and heiress
- Born: Esther Acklom; September 1788
- Died: 11 June 1818 (aged 29); Halkin Street, London
- Buried: Great Brington, Northamptonshire
- Noble family: Spencer (by marriage)
- Spouse: John, Viscount Althorp (m. 1814)
- Father: Richard Acklom
- Mother: Elizabeth Bernard

Esther Acklom (September 1788 – 11 June 1818), also known as Esther Spencer, Viscountess Althorp, was a British heiress and socialite most well known for her social flirtations. Born the only child of Richard Acklom of Wiseton Hall, Nottinghamshire, and his wife Elizabeth, Acklom found great success and popularity in London social circles because of her wealth and good humour. She quickly gained the reputation of a flirt, turning down a large amount of marriage proposals, including those of James, Lord Lindsay, naval officer Edmund Knox, and Henry, Lord Glentworth, the heir of Lord Limerick.

In 1812 Acklom became engaged to the army officer Christopher Tilson, but she broke this off just before the wedding, and she broke off a subsequent engagement to another man after she inherited her father's wealth upon his death in December. She went on to meet John, Viscount Althorp towards the start of 1814, and despite his initial unwillingness she persuaded him to marry her, probably so that he could remove his debts with her dowry and she could receive a title. Notwithstanding this inauspicious start, the marriage was a happy one. Acklom died giving birth to a stillborn child in June 1818, and Althorp mourned her for the rest of his life.

== Life ==
=== Early life ===
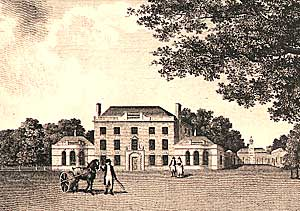
Wiseton Hall

Esther Acklom, born 1788, was the only child of Richard Acklom of Wiseton Hall, Nottinghamshire, and his wife Elizabeth née Bernard, the sister of Francis, Lord Bandon. As such she was also her father's heir, and her wealth led her to be highly popular in London high society despite being "a stout and somewhat plain lady", according to biographer John Andrew Hamilton. Acklom arrived in London in around 1807, living at her father's house in Lower Grosvenor Street. She was supported and sometimes chaperoned by Frances Calvert, the wife of politician Nicolson Calvert, who quickly noted that Acklom was wont to be a flirt and coquette. Frances' brother-in-law, Charles, was one of the first men to propose to Acklom, but she turned him down declaring that she would not marry a man who was over thirty. Social historian John Doran described her as a "queen of hearts...who broke as many as she could".

Soon after her flirtation with Charles Calvert, Acklom began to receive more marriage proposals, turning down James, Lord Lindsay among others. By November Acklom had moved on to attract the attention of another of Frances' relatives, this time her nephew Edmund Knox, a Royal Navy officer. Frances commented of Acklom at this time that "she has a way of encouraging men, without meaning to have them". Acklom's relationship with Frances began to severely deteriorate after this, with the latter attempting to avoid her, and the former behaving "as cold as an icicle". Acklom continued her flirtations, this time with Henry, Lord Glentworth, the heir of Edmund, Lord Limerick. Despite these difficulties, the Calverts were still on good terms with Acklom by 1809, mostly due to their strong relationship with Acklom's father.

Acklom continued to grace social circles, and by the middle of 1811 was still receiving marriage proposals, with Frances resigned that Acklom was "a very good girl, only with some faults in manner". Opinions on Acklom were not all negative however; she was occasionally chaperoned by John Spencer Stanhope's mother, and was close with the Spencer-Stanhope family. Their biographer, A. M. W. Stirling, takes a more positive approach to Acklom, saying that "she was invariably agreeable, despite the fact that her speech was apt to be too frank and her determination too unswerving to render her universally popular".

By 30 June Acklom had keenly agreed to marry a different suitor, Thomas Knox, who was a travelling companion of Spencer Stanhope and elder brother of Edmund Knox, but her father was in declining health and he refused to complete the marriage settlements. (Note: A. M. W. Stirling records that it was Richard Acklom's demands for a higher settlement that broke off the engagement, rather than a refusal to complete them at all.) By November the marriage was all but cancelled because of these difficulties. Frances, still highly involved in Acklom's social life, bitterly commented that "never was there anything equal to the conduct of the Acklom crew, Miss at the head". After this Acklom met Christopher Tilson, a British Army officer, while at Exmouth. The pair became quickly engaged and the marriage was to take place, but Acklom reneged on the agreement just beforehand; Tilson returned to serve in the Peninsular War soon afterwards. In August 1812 Acklom agreed to marry a J. Madocks, but on 31 December her father finally died, leaving her his fortune and compelling her to break her engagement with Madocks. Now worth more than £10,000 a year, Acklom used her newfound wealth to pay Madocks back all the money he had spent on her during their engagement, and he, like Tilson, chose to escape the situation by going off to war.

=== Marriage ===
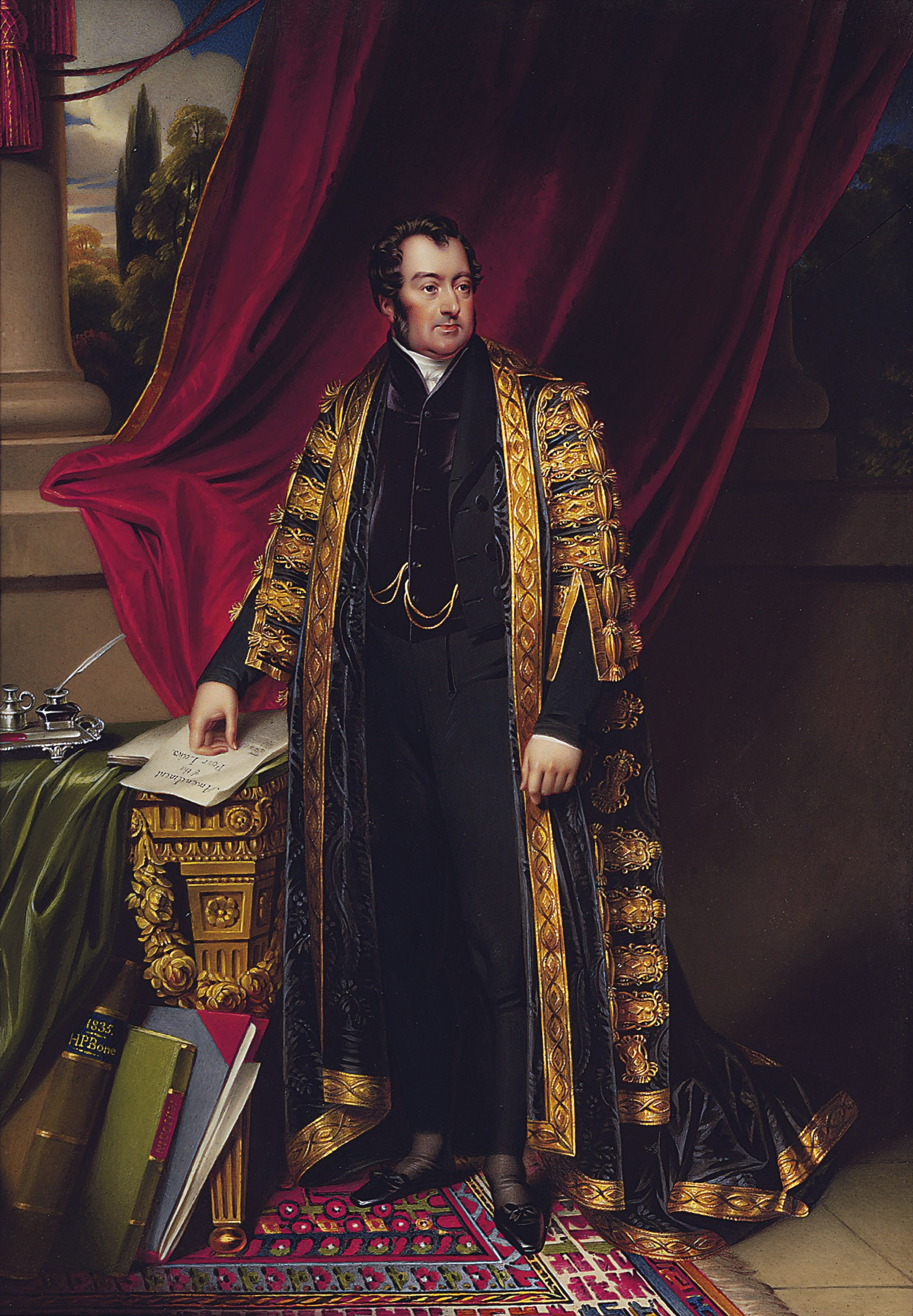
Acklom's husband Althorp in his later years as Earl Spencer

Soon after this Acklom met and was courted by John, Viscount Althorp; he had not intended to marry and was only courting her because his parents wished him to marry, but Acklom made it so clear to him that she wished to marry him that he proposed to her despite this. Acklom was likely drawn to Althorp because of his title, and at first the couple had little to like about each other (it had taken Althorp a two-hour walk before he could bring himself to propose) but this changed as the engagement went on. Before the wedding could take place Althorp's grandmother Georgina, Lady Spencer died, leaving them both in mourning and unable to go ahead with the wedding. She retired to Bath, during which time Tilson returned to England, having been promoted to lieutenant-general. It was thought that Acklom would go back on her engagement with Althorp now that Tilson had returned with higher honours, but this was not to be so. Being lauded for her "intelligence and wit" as well as her wealth, Acklom married Althorp at Upper Brook Street, London, on 13 April 1814, in front of an audience of over 2,000 people.

Some were unimpressed with the marriage, with Althorp's sister Lady Sarah Spencer deriding Acklom as "a vulgar person and a spoilt child", arguing that Althorp only married her in order to settle his debts with her dowry, but still admitting that the marriage itself was a happy one, with the couple devoted to each other. Althorp's mother Lavinia, Lady Spencer, similarly disliked the "portly, homely" Acklom, who biographer John Pearson noted as the antithesis of what Lavinia wanted for her son in a wife. After the marriage Acklom was taken to Althorp on a favourable visit to her new family and their estates, but the couple chose to live together at Wiseton, Acklom's inherited country home that included over 2,000 acres (810 ha) of land. They went about rebuilding Wiseton in a more modern fashion, at a cost of £10,000, with Althorp focusing his time on farming.

Aware that an heir was necessary for the aristocratic Spencer family, Acklom was eager to have a child. She fell pregnant towards the end of 1817, and the couple moved from their town house on noisy Pall Mall to William, Lord Fitzwilliam's quieter house in Halkin Street. On 8 June 1818 the baby, a boy, was stillborn there. Acklom stayed abed, and on 11 June her health deteriorated rapidly and she too died, despite the efforts of Althorp and her doctor to revive her. Her death left her husband heavily in grief. Acklom was buried alongside her son in the family vault at Great Brington on 18 June. Althorp, who had been master of the Pytchley Hunt, refused to hunt again in her memory, and chose to always wear black mourning clothes. Despite later becoming the third Earl Spencer, he never married again, leaving his brother Frederick to inherit the title upon his death, at which point he was still wearing a locket containing a strand of Acklom's hair.
