= Listed buildings in Wiseton =

Wiseton is a civil parish in the Bassetlaw District of Nottinghamshire, England. The parish contains 14 listed buildings that are recorded in the National Heritage List for England. All the listed buildings are designated at Grade II, the lowest of the three grades, which is applied to "buildings of national importance and special interest". The parish contains the village of Wiseton and the surrounding area. The original Wiseton Hall was replaced in 1962 by a building which is not listed, but a number of buildings in the grounds are listed, including the stable range and a pair of entrance lodges. The Chesterfield Canal passes through the parish, and two bridges crossing it are listed. The other listed buildings include estate cottages, a farmhouse, a public house, two ice houses, and a model dairy.

== Buildings ==
Name and location	Photograph	Date	Notes
The Grange; 53.40014°N 0.92233°W		Late 17th century	A farmhouse in colourwashed brick on a plinth, with a floor band, moulded eaves, and a pantile roof with coped gables and kneelers. There are two storeys and attics and five bays, a two-storey two-bay extension to the right, and a single-storey lean-to. The central doorway has a fanlight, and the windows are sashes with rubbed brick heads. There are casement windows in the right gable and in the lean-to, and the extension contains a mullioned and transomed window.
Wiseton Top Bridge; 53.39917°N 0.92148°W		c. 1775	An accommodation bridge over the Chesterfield Canal, it is in brick with stone dressings, and consists of a single stilted segmental arch. The bridge has stone soffits and jambs, projecting impost blocks, a keystone, and a brick parapet with stone coping.
Lady's Bridge; 53.40439°N 0.92489°W		Late 18th century	The ornamental bridge carries a private road over the Chesterfield Canal. It is in rendered brick with stone dressings, and consists of a single stilted segmental arch. The bridge has stone soffits, keystones carved with masks, and stone coped parapets with an ornamental cast iron railing. The abutments are octagonal, and the piers have octagonal caps.
The Duck; 53.40593°N 0.93934°W		Late 18th century	Formerly the White Swan Hotel, the public house is in red brick on a rendered plinth, with floor bands, dentilled eaves, and hipped tile roofs. In the centre is a three-storey canted three-bay block, flanked by two-storey single-bay wings, outside which are single-storey two-bay extensions. In the centre is a doorway with a rusticated surround, and the windows are a mix of sashes and casements, those in the middle floor of the central block in round arches. To the left is a canted porch linked to an outbuilding that has a pantile roof, two storeys and three bays. In the ground floor are two French windows, and the upper floor contains casement windows with segmental heads.
Gardeners Cottage, Wiseton Hall; 53.40003°N 0.92456°W	—	Late 18th century	The cottage is in brick with floor bands, an eaves band and a slate roof. There are two storeys and a single bay. In the ground floor is a doorway and a sash window, and the upper floor contains a horizontally-sliding sash window flanked by blank panels with rubbed brick heads.
Wall, gate piers, gates and spring head, Wiseton Hall; 53.40060°N 0.92602°W	—	Late 18th century	The wall enclosing the garden of the demolished hall is in brick with stone dressings and buttresses. It contains a pair of square brick piers on rendered plinths, with recessed panels, and capitals on scrolled brackets, and between them is a pair of elaborate wrought iron gates and a decorative overthrow. In the centre is a spring head in brick with stone dressings. It contains a grotesque mask in a moulded surround, a moulded entablature, and an arched broken pediment, and is flanked by square brick piers with stone capitals.
Ice House, Wiseton Hall; 53.39792°N 0.92219°W	—	c. 1800	The ice house has a brick doorway, partly rendered, with a segmental head. The brick passage leads to a circular brick saucer-domed ice chamber.
The Gatehouse Lodges and gate piers 53.40614°N 0.93846°W		Early 19th century	The two lodges flanking the entrance to the drive of Wiseton Hall are in rendered brick with stone dressings, deep moulded eaves and pyramidal slate roofs. They have a single storey, a single bay, a square plan, and pilasters flanking the openings and at the corners. On the street front is a sash window, and on the drive front is a doorway with a fanlight. To the east is a three-bay round-arched arcade with rendered square piers on stone plinths, surmounted by a moulded pediment. Between the lodges are four round stone gate piers with incised decoration and gadrooned caps.
Icehouse, Gatehouse Lodges; 53.40598°N 0.93862°W		Early 19th century	The ice house has a brick doorway with a segmental head. A flight of steps leads down to a brick chamber, with a segmental vault measuring about 6 feet (1.8 m) by 10 feet (3.0 m).
Laurel Cottage; 53.40051°N 0.92259°W		c. 1830	The estate cottage is in brick with stone dressings and a hipped Welsh slate roof. There is a single storey and attics, two bays, and a single-storey flat-roofed rear extension. In the centre is a gabled porch with a Tudor arch and a recessed doorway. It is flanked by three-light mullioned windows with hood moulds. In the attic are two gabled eaves dormers containing two-light mullioned windows with hood moulds. In the left return is a large three-light window.
Woodbine Cottage; 53.40050°N 0.92279°W		c. 1830	The estate cottage is in brick with stone dressings and a hipped Welsh slate roof. There is a single storey and attics, two bays, and a single-storey flat-roofed rear extension. In the centre is a gabled porch with a Tudor arch and a recessed doorway. It is flanked by three-light mullioned windows with hood moulds. In the attic are two gabled eaves dormers containing two-light mullioned windows with hood moulds. In the left return is a large three-light window.
Dairy, Home Farm; 53.39781°N 0.92896°W	—	Late 19th century	The model dairy is in pebbledashed and colourwashed brick, on a plinth, with stone dressings and a tile roof. There is a single storey and an octagonal plan. The doorway has a chamfered surround and a rectangular fanlight. In the other faces are iron-framed casement windows with chamfered surrounds.
Wiseton Stables; 53.40122°N 0.92371°W		1899	The stable block of Wiseton Hall is in brick with stone dressings, floor bands, dentilled eaves and roofs in pantile and lead. There are two storeys and a closed courtyard plan with ranges of 20 bays. The central projecting gatehouse has a round arch and banded rustication, above which is a stage with coped ramps containing a clock face with keystones. Over this is a pyramidal roof, on which is a bellcote with balusters and a lead tent roof with two finials. The flanking walls contain ventilators with rubbed brick heads, and mullioned and transomed windows. Elsewhere, there are stables, a carriage house and a groom's house.
Rose Cottage, Hawthorn Cottage, Myrtle Cottage and outbuildings 53.40159°N 0.92118°W		c. 1900	A row of three estate cottages in red brick, with quoins, moulded and dentilled eaves, and a hipped tile roof with swept valleys. There is a single storey and attics, and four bays, the outer bays projecting. The doorways have fanlights, and the windows are sashes. In the attics are dormers, those in the outer bays gabled and pedimented, the four between with flat roofs. At the rear are two square brick outbuildings with pyramidal roofs.
