= Albert Cordingley =

English cricketer (1871–1945)

Personal information
- Full name: Albert Cordingley
- Born: 13 May 1871; Greengates, Bradford, Yorkshire, England
- Died: 27 April 1945 (aged 73); West Green, Crawley, Sussex, England
- Batting: Left-handed
- Bowling: Slow left-arm
- Role: Bowler

Domestic team information
- Years: Team
- 1901–1905: Sussex

Career statistics
| Competition | First-class |
|---|---|
| Matches | 15 |
| Runs scored | 47 |
| Batting average | 5.22 |
| 100s/50s | 0/0 |
| Top score | 24* |
| Balls bowled | 1,137 |
| Wickets | 16 |
| Bowling average | 34.12 |
| 5 wickets in innings | 1 |
| 10 wickets in match | 0 |
| Best bowling | 5/22 |
| Catches/stumpings | 9/0 |
- Source: , 9 January 2011

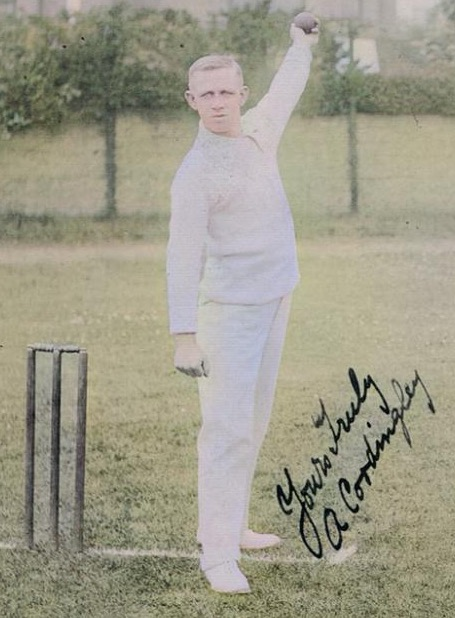
Albert Cordingley c. 1900 (colourised image from an original cabinet photograph in the private collection of Nicholas Sharp)

Albert Cordingley (13 May 1871 – 27 April 1945) was an English professional cricketer from Yorkshire who played first-class cricket for Sussex in the early years of the 20th century.

Cordingley turned professional at age 22, becoming a club pro at Lytham in Lancashire and compiling four seasons of increasingly impressive performances which brought him to the attention of Yorkshire, who hired him at the end of 1897 as a potential replacement for left-arm spin bowler Bobby Peel, who had been dismissed. He played for the Yorkshire 2nd XI the following year, as well as in one non first-class match with the first XI against Worcestershire, but then rejected the offer of a place in the Yorkshire first team squad as backup to Wilfred Rhodes and returned to club cricket, this time at Wiseton in Nottinghamshire. Again he was spotted by a first-class county, and after a successful private trial he was offered a contract by Sussex and accepted despite the fact that he would have to wait two years before officially qualifying to play for his new county.

He moved south and determinedly worked his way back up from club cricket to make his first-class debut in 1901 at the age of 30 for Sussex. His two best performances for the county both occurred early in the following season; he took a five-wicket haul against Nottinghamshire at Trent Bridge, and shared a record 115-run 9th-wicket partnership with test-player "Ranji" (K. S. Ranjitsinhji) against Surrey at The Oval, going on to appear in 10 matches for the Sussex first XI that season. He was sparingly used though, bowling just over 100 overs, and was dropped from the first team for the following two seasons but stayed contracted to Sussex and was recalled in 1905 to play four final matches for them.

Following his relatively short first-class career, he returned to full-time club cricket in 1906 and played until 1911 for East Grinstead, serving as the club pro from 1907. He remained involved in cricket for the rest of his life, devoting over 25 years to the village club at Pease Pottage, near Crawley, Sussex, as a player, coach, groundsman, and umpire after joining it in 1912, as well as making guest appearances for several other Sussex clubs. Having honed his groundskeeping skills earlier in his career at Lytham and Wiseton, and on the ground staff at Hove, he prepared a pitch at Pease Pottage that was considered to be of county cricket standard, seeing some of the highest batting totals in Sussex scored on it. The cricket ground was ploughed up in 1940 after the advent of World War II to serve as allotments for the war effort, and the club disbanded after many of its players had left to join the British armed forces.

Among the most notable wickets he took at different stages of his career as a bowler were those of John Tunnicliffe, Arthur Shrewsbury, and Sir Arthur Conan Doyle. He was also a substitute fielder for Yorkshire in a match against M.C.C. at Lord's in 1898 and took to the pitch while W. G. Grace, one of the greatest cricketers of all time, was batting.

== Early life and development as an amateur cricketer (1871–1893) ==
Albert was born at Low Fold, Greengates, near Bradford, in the Spring of 1871 to Joseph Cordingley, a drier at the local wool mill, and his wife Esther, daughter of a canal boatman. He had three elder brothers and three sisters, and the family started out poor but were aspiring. His father would leave the mill in the 1870s to set up shop as a furniture dealer, becoming a respected tradesman in nearby Eccleshill, and his brothers James, William and Harry would become, respectively, a publican, a carter, and a coppersmith. Their younger brother Albert initially followed their father into mill work, and by age 20 had worked his way up to the supervisory position of overlooker.

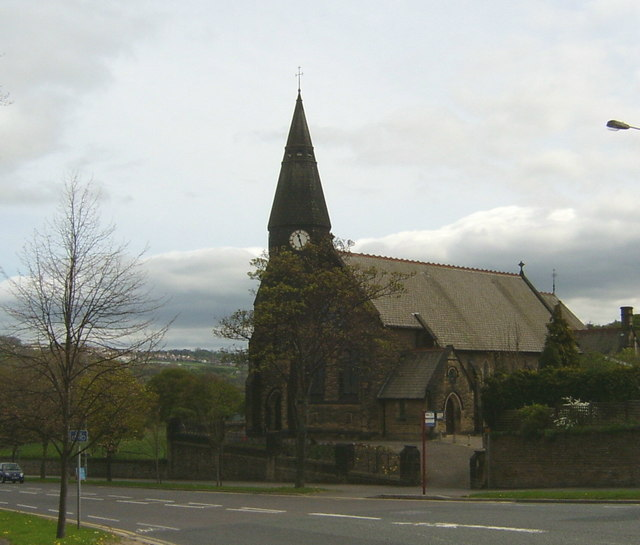
St John's Church, Greengates

The young cricketer began his competitive career as a youth with local side Greengates Church Cricket Club, who competed mainly in the Bradford League, and in whose church, St John's, his youngest sister Laura would be baptised in September 1894. In May 1890, having just turned 19 years old, he played one of his first ever organised competitive fixtures, taking 3 wickets in a low-scoring loss to Bingley Primitives, but then dominated a second match against the same team in July, batting at number 1 and taking 7 wickets.

The following season he stepped up a level and began playing for the neighbouring Eccleshill Club, whose league cricket was played in the Airedale and Wharfedale League. He took 7 wickets for Eccleshill in a 26-run victory at Chickenly in June 1892, and the following season helped them to a third-place league finish, along the way claiming a hat-trick as part of a five-wicket haul for 27 runs in a convincing 21-run victory over fellow title-chasers Guiseley. One of his final performances for Eccleshill came in late September 1893 in a 31-run victory over Spen Victoria. Coincidentally, 46 years later Eccleshill would win its first ever Priestley Cup by defeating the same Spen Victoria in the final, and Albert's name would be mentioned in newspaper reports as being one of its best former players.

== Professional cricket career (1894–1920) ==
=== Lytham, Lancashire (1894–1897) ===
Cordingley, a slightly built man of below-average height, began his professional career at the age of 22, when he was engaged in April 1894 as professional at Lytham, and he had four increasingly successful seasons with the club. His first season began encouragingly, with the young bowler taking 4 wickets of the 8 to fall in a hefty 98-run victory over Castleton in May 1894, and he helped his club to a ninth successive victory in late July by taking another 4 wickets in a solid 42-run victory over Fylde. In August he was re-engaged for the following year "at a considerably higher salary." Despite Lytham having a poor 1895 season, with a record of 7 wins, 6 draws and 11 losses, Cordingley performed admirably again, finishing with a record of 107 wickets at a cost of 7.35 runs each. He was re-engaged for the 1896 season but, not being required in Lancashire until later in April, he was able to play a game for his old club Eccleshill against neighbours Idle on the 18th, showing that he was keeping in touch with his cricketing roots in Yorkshire. He had another fine year in Lancashire in 1896, and in one match towards the end of the season in August took 9 of the 10 wickets to fall in a thumping 85-run victory over visitors East Lancashire Wanderers. At the beginning of August 1897, after four seasons during which he had rendered "yeoman service" to Lytham, according to an account in the Blackpool Gazette, he was allocated a benefit match against Lancaster, which Lytham handily won by a score of 151 to 82, in no small part due to their Yorkshire professional, who took 7 wickets for 16 runs. The event was expected to have netted Cordingley "a nice sum", since many tickets had been sold and the attendance was good. In possibly his final appearance for the club, in early September 1897 against Broughton, he secured an easy 54-run victory by again taking 7 wickets in an innings.

=== Yorkshire County Cricket Club (1897–1898) ===
Towards the end of the 1897 season, Cordingley came to the attention of his native county team and he competed with Wilfred Rhodes for a place in the Yorkshire first team after the sacking of bowling all-rounder Bobby Peel for misconduct. While Cordingley was usually classified nominally as a slow left-arm bowler, The Daily Argus, a Bradford newspaper, noted that he had a technically good bowling action and could effectively alter the pace he bowled the ball, the Yorkshire Post described him as a "medium-paced bowler", and The Manchester Guardian recorded that he "bowls medium pace, and keeps a remarkably good length." Whatever Cordingley's pace of delivery was at the time, he was as well qualified for a bowling role with Yorkshire as Rhodes: there were excellent reports from his time at Lytham and early bowling results with Yorkshire actually favoured Cordingley, who was also six years Rhodes' senior.

A trial match to uncover new bowling talent for Yorkshire was staged at the end of the 1897 season at Park Avenue, Bradford beginning on 20 September between Yorkshire and a selection of promising colt players from around the county. Cordingley handily outperformed his younger rival in the match, finishing the first day's play with the impressive figures of 8 wickets for 33 runs off 21 overs for Yorkshire against the Colts. Remarkably, the slow left-armer's return might have been even better: he was unlucky to have two easy catches missed off his bowling by senior players, one of the culprits being the fielder at mid-off, the Yorkshire captain Lord Hawke, who ironically was a strict disciplinarian notorious for taking a very dim view of dropped catches. In contrast, Rhodes toiled away for 15 overs against the county, conceding 61 runs for the sole wicket of Robert Collinson. The Sporting Life singled out Cordingley's performance for praise, qualifying him as a bowler who "keeps a remarkably good length". For the second day of the match, it was decided to see what Cordingley could achieve against the senior team and he did not disappoint, opening the bowling for the Colts and dismissing both Yorkshire's talented all-rounder Frank Milligan and the unfortunate Collinson, both out bowled, at a cost of 41 runs off 18 overs. Switching sides again and taking yet another Colts' wicket, Cordingley finished the game with superb aggregate figures of 11 wickets for 95 runs from 47 overs, whereas Rhodes took just one Colts' wicket in the second innings to finish with a return of 2 wickets for 99 runs from 27 overs in the match. The Yorkshire Committee were impressed with Cordingley's performance and approached him informally to see if he might be interested in joining his native county club; a measure of the man is that his first response was to tell them that, since he was still employed by Lytham and they had "treated him so kindly", he would need to consult with them before agreeing to anything with Yorkshire. Lytham duly informed Cordingley that they would reluctantly release him. Despite Rhodes' relatively lacklustre figures, he had shown promise in the trial game, so when the Yorkshire Committee met in Sheffield on 6 October to discuss arrangements for the following season, it was decided that both Cordingley and Rhodes would be retained.

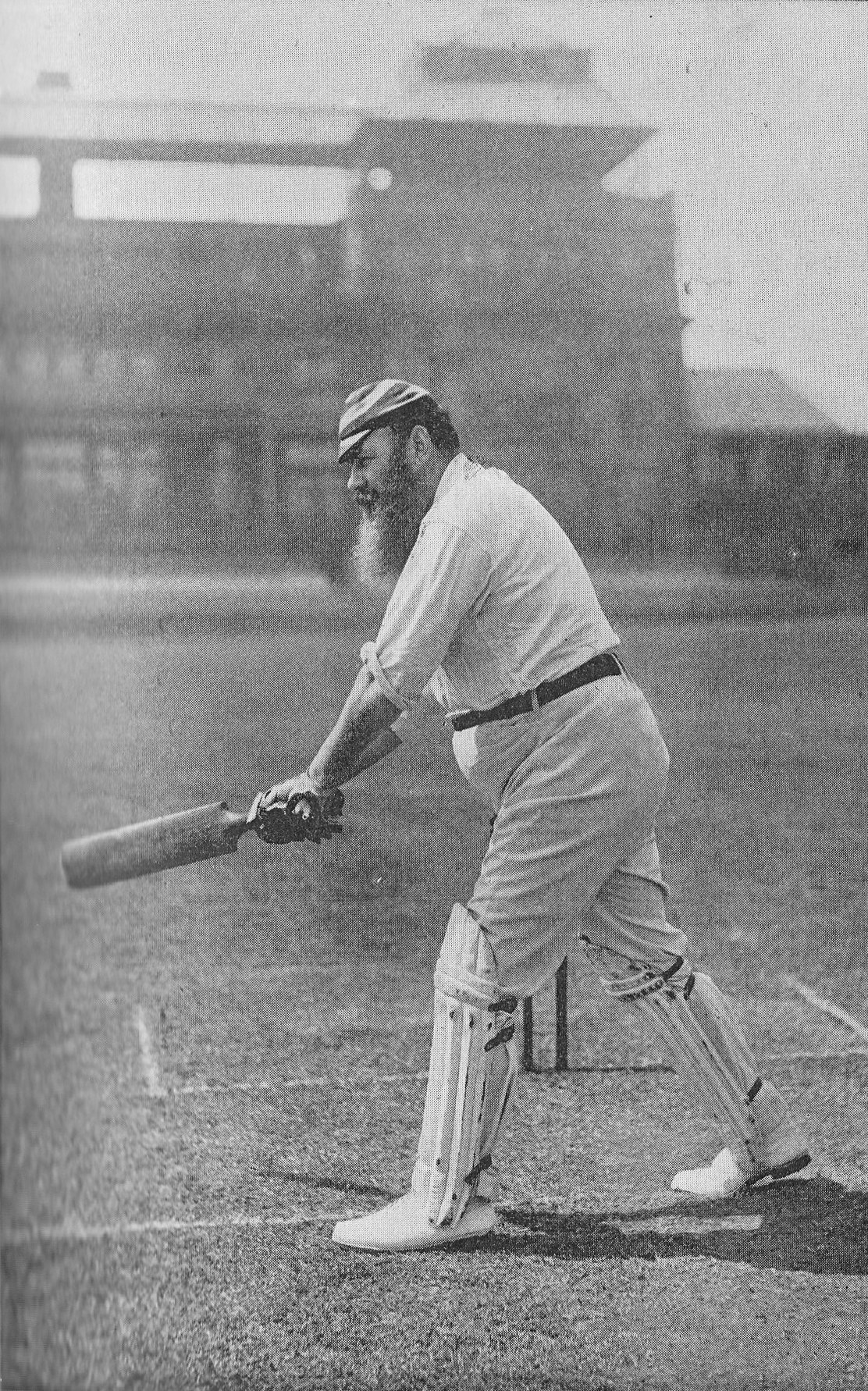
W. G. Grace (1897)

The trend of bowling results reversed at the start of the 1898 season, beginning with a badly rain-affected match between Yorkshire Colts and Nottinghamshire Colts at Nottingham on 9–10 May in which both men figured; Cordingley performed economically, opening the bowling for Yorkshire in both innings and taking 1 wicket for 14 runs from 13 overs in the match, but Rhodes was more deadly though more expensive, claiming 4 victims for 37 runs off 17 overs, three of them stumped. The poor weather in Nottingham had though "prevented any real estimates of their abilities being made", and the turning point came two days later in a high-profile match against Marylebone Cricket Club (M.C.C.) at Lord's which began on 12 May. This was a far more prestigious affair, in which W. G. Grace played, i.e. in a class of cricket to which the two Yorkshire pretenders Cordingley and Rhodes included in the squad were "practically strangers". According to one story, Yorkshire captain Lord Hawke and leading amateur cricketer Stanley Jackson could not agree on which player to leave out and chose Rhodes merely on the result of a coin toss. Hawke however later denied this version of events; he claimed always to have believed Rhodes to be the better bowler and said that Jackson came to the same view after seeing Rhodes bowling during practice. Match reports at the time in the mainstream press relate instead that Cordingley had actually been selected to play, and it was only on the arrival of all-rounder Jackson "at the last moment" that Cordingley lost his place, while Rhodes had already replaced the absent all-rounder Milligan in the Yorkshire team. Jackson, although an exceptionally talented cricketer who had captained Harrow and Cambridge, and would go on to captain Yorkshire and England, was also a powerful, well-connected aristocrat who would at different future times become Chairman of the Conservative Party, President of the M.C.C., and President of Yorkshire, so it is possible that non-cricketing factors were (also) at work, especially as it appears that the final decision had to be made at the last minute prior to play beginning. Whatever the reasons, Cordingley had to be content with a role as the twelfth man. He took to the turf on the second day as substitute fielder for Haigh while W. G. Grace was at the crease. Rhodes meanwhile fully justified his selection by taking 6 for 63 in the match.

On the strength of his Lord's performance, Rhodes was chosen in the team for the next match against Somerset at Bath, while Cordingley was again consigned to a squad role. On 16 June, the first day of the Somerset game, Cordingley's mother Esther died, and on receiving the news he packed his bags and began the long journey back home to Greengates to attend the funeral. Rhodes meanwhile bowled with "great distinction", albeit on a classic "sticky wicket", taking 13 wickets for 45 runs, and after this run of form Cordingley was forced to accept that there was no immediate likelihood of taking his place. This stroke of bad luck for Cordingley gave rise to an unkind myth that after witnessing Rhodes' performance, he shook Rhodes' hand, having accepted his rival's superiority as a bowler, and returned home to Yorkshire for this reason, abdicating his responsibility to complete the team's tour of the South of England. In any case, Rhodes went on to take full profit from an 1898 season that was unusually wet and thus highly conducive to spin bowling, taking 141 wickets, helping Yorkshire to regain the County Championship title they had lost to their arch-rivals Lancashire the previous year, and demonstrating his future potential as a batsman by scoring three fifties. He would thereafter play for England and become one of the greatest all-rounders of his generation.

Cordingley meanwhile played a few games for the Yorkshire Second XI and in a non first-class match against Worcestershire: in July he played away at Lakenham against Norfolk, taking just two wickets in the match in a shock 20-run defeat, and at Worcester with most of the regular first team, bowling just 7 overs in the match and taking 1 for 25 in a 3-wicket victory. Ironically, Cordingley's final competitive match for Yorkshire proved to be one of his best performances for the county. In late August at Scarborough in the return 2nd XI match against Norfolk, he bagged 8 wickets in a convincing innings and 39-run revenge victory, narrowly missing a difficult return catch chance towards the end of the match which would have also earned him a hat-trick. The Yorkshire Evening Post praised his excellent performance and noted that he had been given little opportunity during the season to prove that his 11-wicket haul in the previous season's colts match had been "no fluke". One of his final outings for the county showed that this analysis was correct: in another end-of-season Colts match, this time played at Headingley, he took a five wicket-haul for 68 runs off 23 overs.

=== Wiseton, Nottinghamshire (1899) ===
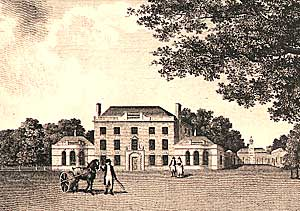
Wiseton Hall c.1790

At the beginning of the 1899 season, the Yorkshire Committee still considered Cordingley worthy of a place in the first team squad, particularly as his bowling style was different to that of Rhodes. Cordingley however believed that if he stayed on at Yorkshire it would only be as back-up to Rhodes and so refused the playing contract he was offered. Instead, while remaining on Yorkshire's books, he took a position as a professional working for Sir Joseph Laycock with a team based at his residence, Wiseton Hall, Bawtry, Nottinghamshire in April 1899, and had taken 109 wickets at an average of 7 for them by late August of that year. In addition to his playing duties, Cordingley was also responsible for upkeep of the beautiful cricket ground "unequalled for its position in any shire" surrounded by flower beds fronting Wiseton Hall, maintaining it "in a state of perfection".

=== Sussex County Cricket Club (1900–1905) ===
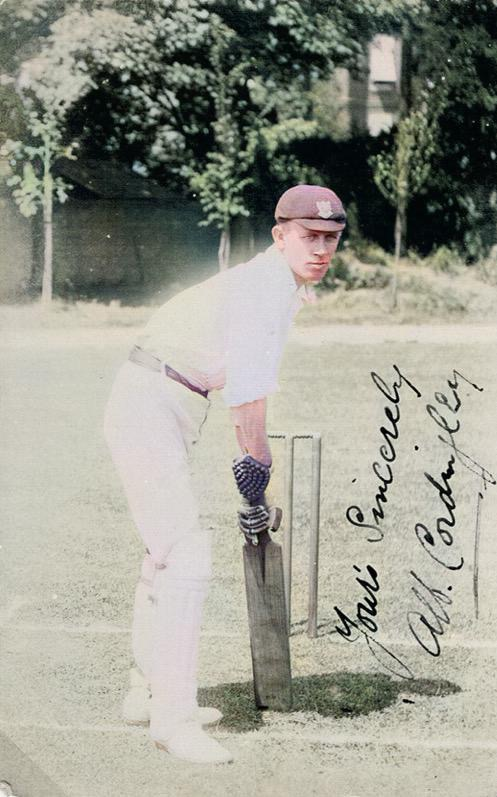
Albert Cordingley c. 1900 (colourised image from an original postcard in the private collection of Nicholas Sharp)

Towards the end of the 1899 season at Wiseton, he agreed terms to move on and play first-class cricket for Sussex once he could qualify by residency – a process that would take two years – after impressing at a private trial bowling against George Brann and club secretary William "Billy" Newham in the nets at Hove. This trial, Cordingley would later reveal, was organised by the Sussex great "Ranji" (K. S. Ranjitsinhji), who had been playing at the Headlingley Test Match in 1899, and came about because of a conversation Cordingley had with his local barber Jimmy Beaumont in Apperley Bridge, who then relayed the message to the more famous Sussex player, who was also a client, that Cordingley still desired to play at the highest domestic level.

During the 1900–01 seasons he travelled with the first team to all their fixtures but could not play in championship matches. He played instead for the Sussex second XI and for various Sussex clubs while he waited for his county residency qualification, which would not become official until January 1902. He put in a remarkable all-round performance in one of the first of the club fixtures, in June 1900, scoring 33 with the bat for Silverhill and taking 9 Southborough wickets for 27 runs off 16 overs, the last 7 wickets coming at a cost of just 7 runs in 10 overs, 6 of which were maidens. The three county second XI matches were less successful; despite taking 5 wickets at Lord's against the Middlesex second team in July 1900, the home side prevailed, and he only took 3 wickets in total the following season in the home and away fixtures against the Kent second string, his county also losing both matches.

In this period, he also received a small inheritance in April 1901 after his father Joseph died. It was shared with his brother-in-law, a mill worker who had married his younger sister Eliza, and would help tide Albert over financially until he could start playing first-class cricket. Albert's other five siblings were all still alive but were overlooked for the bequest, so it is clear that Joseph had recognised his youngest son's ongoing financial need.

Albert finally made his first-class debut at the age of 30 on 27 June 1901 in front of a crowd of over 2,000 spectator at the Saffrons Cricket Ground in Eastbourne in a match between Sussex and Oxford University, whose captain Frank Knox graciously allowed Cordingley to take the field even though he was not yet officially qualified to play for his new county side. The Sussex newcomer bowled 28 wicketless overs in the first innings at a cost of 92 runs on a wicket "appearing too hard to suit him", but improved greatly to take 3 for 29 off 7.3 overs in the second, including the wickets of both varsity openers, Marsham and Dillon.

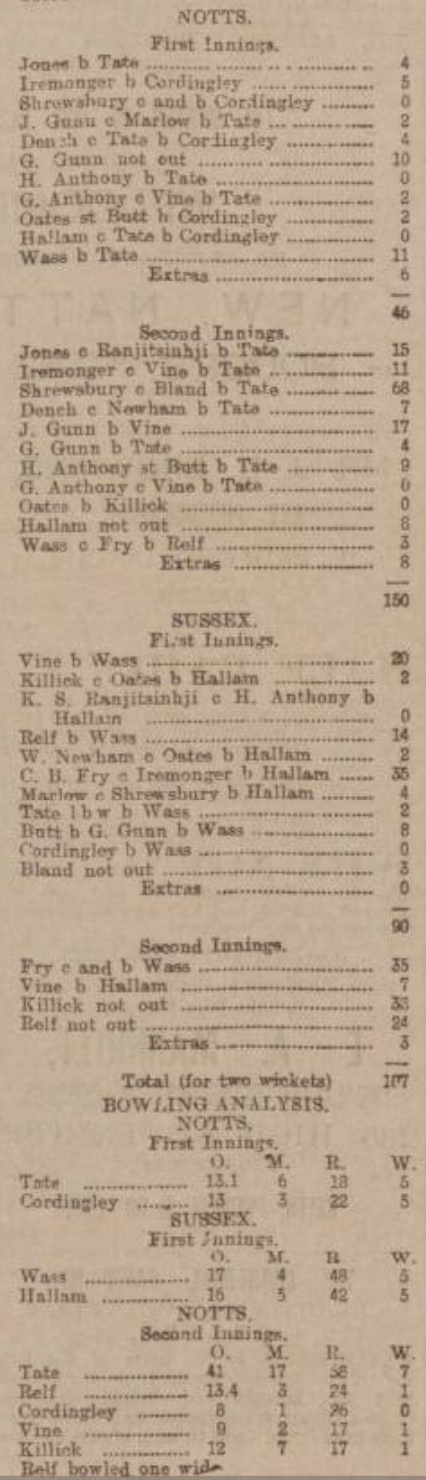
Scoresheet – Notts v. Sussex 2–3 June 1902

It would be difficult to make the case that Cordingley was a player over-showered with luck at key moments during his cricketing career, and so it was that in May 1902 his debut game as a fully-qualified Sussex player came not only under the intense spotlight of an away match at the Headingley headquarters of his former employers, Yorkshire, but also in a frigid early-season fixture that delivered "too much weather and too little cricket", with snow squalls and arctic temperature making it nigh impossible for slow bowlers like him to grip and manipulate the ball properly. Cordingley was called upon to send down just 8 overs in the match, for no reward, and was bowled by Hirst for 8 runs in his sole appearance as a batsman. There were some elements of (literally) cold comfort for Cordingley: even though the Yorkshire side appeared much stronger than their southern opponents, mercifully for the visitors the game ended in a draw despite Yorkshire's attempt to force a result on the dreary proceedings with a second innings declaration; Cordingley's old nemesis Rhodes was similarly ineffective, taking only 1 wicket for 111 runs from 41 overs; and one of the two catches Cordingley took was that of the Yorkshire captain, Lord Hawke, perhaps compensating for the drop he had made off Cordingley five seasons previously. Uppermost in his mind though was more likely disappointment at how sparingly he had been used; some of the more prescient journalists had already started to question why he had been put in the team in the first place if his skills were not going to be fully used.

The former Yorkshire man's two best performances came within the space of a few days in June 1902: he took five wickets for 22 runs against Nottinghamshire on the second day of the month at Trent Bridge, including a sharp return catch to dismiss for a duck Arthur Shrewsbury, who would end the season atop the first-class batting averages, and shared a partnership of 115 scored in only 100 minutes for the 9th wicket with his great friend and supporter "Ranji" at the Oval against Surrey on the tenth, remaining unbeaten on 24 at the conclusion of the first innings. While Cordingley clearly played the minor part, offering "stubborn defence" according to the Evening Standard, this partnership was at the time the record 9th wicket stand for Sussex in an away fixture, and remains the 4th highest (as of June 2023).

Cordingley stayed on with Sussex the following year, but played only three second XI matches in each of the 1903 and 1904 seasons, taking just 13 wickets in total in the six fixtures. Sussex's second team was indeed very weak overall compared to its southern opposition from Middlesex, Kent and Essex; in the eleven second XI matches in which he featured for Sussex from 1900 to 1904 there were no victories, with five drawn matches and six defeats.

Finally, Cordingley was recalled to the first team for his last four matches in June and July 1905, all producing draws, and with little personal success for the veteran bowler; he took just 4 wickets in aggregate for 127 runs from 48 overs. In all, he had featured in just 15 first-class games for Sussex in his six years under contract to them, and it is probably no coincidence that his best bowling performance for the county came in the early season when the pitch would have been softer, and more importantly in an away fixture; as a Leeds journalist observed during his final season with them, "Cordingley has made comparatively few appearances in county cricket. But Brighton is the sort of wicket to break any slow bowler's heart, and Cordingley might have achieved better results almost anywhere else." Three years after he left Sussex, another Yorkshire journalist agreed in retrospect, declaring that "...the wickets at Brighton gave him such a small chance of distinction that he never gained a permanent place in the Sussex eleven."

This was an era when "the majority of the county cricket clubs could not take proper care of even their best professionals"; Cordingley would have been well aware of this, and the fact that even in his first season with Sussex the club had been in a serious financial position. It ended the year in debt to its financiers, having made a loss of over £1,400 on income of just under £5,300, of which only £750 had been paid to its playing staff. The club was still in debt at the beginning of 1904 and was only able to clear the obligation during the year by holding "a successful bazaar". This respite was temporary and by the end of Cordingley's final season with the county, despite good on-field results it had fallen back into the red and was contemplating drastic measures to right the financial ship even including the "abandonment of the tea interval".

=== East Grinstead, Sussex (1906–1911) ===
After leaving Sussex, and with the impending birth of his second child Kathleen, at the beginning of the 1906 season Cordingley was undoubtedly in search of better long-term security for his growing family. He came from a humble background and had had to search out income wherever he could throughout the early years of his career; he had for example been obliged to labour in a Bradford furniture warehouse (probably his father Joseph's) in the winter before his first season with Yorkshire in 1898 because he received no remuneration from the club during the close season.

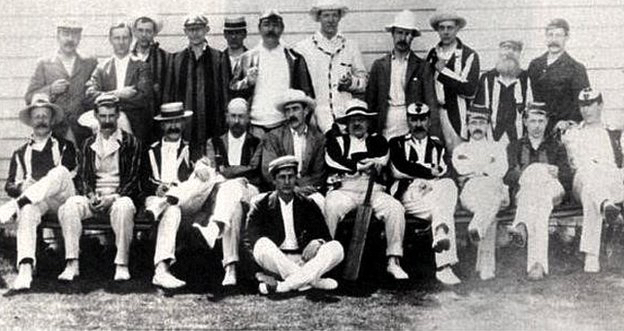
Sir Arthur Conan Doyle (back row, 6th from left) at an Authors v. Artists game (1903)

In June 1906 he began playing for the East Grinstead Cricket Club, which engaged him as full-time professional for the 1907 season, giving him some prospect of security in the short term. He celebrated his new appointment in fine style in the first game of the year, a home fixture at the club's West Street ground against a strong Brixton Wanderers team, by top-scoring with 55 runs out of a total of 186 and taking 6 wickets for 64 runs to set up a victory by 35 runs. Another memorable occasion with his new club was a cricket festival game against M.C.C. in August 1908 when he not only top-scored again with 67 runs out of total of 268 batting at number 11, but also took 5 wickets including the notable scalp of Sir Arthur Conan Doyle, a keen cricketer who played 10 first-class games for M.C.C., dismissed l.b.w. for 4, as well as that of his brother, John Francis Ines Hay Doyle. Cordingley was going through a purple patch with the bat, and a week later scored 50 not out against Sussex Martlets, again from the number 11 position, to complete a hat-trick of century partnerships for the 10th wicket inside a week!

In August 1909, Cordingley travelled with East Grinstead to play at Horley – a team who he would play for four years later – taking 7 wickets in an easy 57-run victory for the visitors, and bringing his total haul for the season to over 100 wickets.

Cordingley ended up serving as club professional for five full seasons, but again poor business management by his employer created a worrying situation for him. East Grinstead ran into financial difficulties due to falling subscriptions in 1911, and his contract was terminated at season's end to save the cost of "between £40 and £50" that his playing and groundskeeping services were costing them annually out of a total income of just over £220.

=== Pease Pottage, Sussex (1912–1920) ===
Having turned 40 years old while in his final season at East Grinstead, he finally found long-term stability in 1912 in the service of the wealthy Goddard family of Pease Pottage [then usually spelled Peas Pottage], Sussex. The former county player was ostensibly hired to work as a gardener at the Goddard family's residence, Tilgate Forest Cottage, and the Cordingley family took up residence nearby in the village, but Albert spent most of his time initially as a player, coach, and groundsman, and latterly as an umpire and groundsman, at Pease Pottage Cricket Club, of which Jack Goddard was the President, and whose ground adjoined the Tilgate estate.

Once established in the side, Cordingley became one of its mainstays. In the 26-match 1913 season, he was by far its leading wicket-taker, capturing 119 wickets for 1032 runs (average 8.80) off 403 overs, and was third top score with the bat, compiling 479 runs at an average of 25.4. One of his finest performances as a player came in an outstanding match against the United Sports Club at the tail-end of the club's pre-WWI heyday, in July 1914. He took 10 wickets for 102 runs to seal a victory by an innings and 110 runs in a match that also saw the club's record opening stand of 289 by Adair and Crossland.

During his time at Pease Pottage, Cordingley also made several appearances for other clubs in the area, usually on Saturdays. During the 1913 season, he travelled with neighbouring side Horley to compete in the Merstham Cricket Week in August, taking 4 wickets and contributing 7 of the runs in a narrow 18-run victory for the visitors in an unusual 12-a-side match played on what Cordingley himself described as a "glue-pot" wicket. He continued his winning streak against Merstham the following month playing for Reigate Priory, the Yorkshireman contributing 3 wickets and 9 unbeaten runs to a slim 13-run victory for the home side. In July 1914, he played again for Horley, taking 8 wickets in a 126-run thrashing of visitors Purley.

One of his final games as a player for Pease Pottage came at the age of 49, in June 1920, in an emphatic 73-run victory at Cuckfield, in which he bowled economically, taking 3 wickets for 13 runs, and contributed 16 runs with the bat.

In addition to his ongoing performances as a player, Cordingley earned a reputation for encouraging cricket in the local area, and for preparing a pitch at Pease Pottage on which almost all Sussex county players of the period played and which was considered by many to be of the same standard of most county grounds.

== Post-professional playing career (1921–29) ==
Even after retiring as a player for Pease Pottage at the end of the 1920 season, after which the Cordingley family moved from Pease Pottage to Crawley, Albert remained involved with the club as groundsman and umpire while continuing to play occasionally in recreational games for other teams. One of the first of these games came in June 1921 when he played for Crawley Working Men, taking 7 wickets for 23 runs in a slim 12-run victory over Roffey. The following June, he helped Three Bridges to a 57-run thrashing of Lingfield, taking 4 wickets for 19 runs. Possibly his final appearance as a player came at age 58 in a match between Crawley Working Men's "Old Uns" v. "Young Uns" in June 1929. Characteristically, he put in a polished performance, posting a second-top score of 24 batting at number 3, and recording the best bowling performance of the match, with figures of 5 wickets for 11 runs, to set up a victory by 43 runs for the old timers.

== Groundskeeping and coaching ==
It is not clear exactly when Cordingley ended his groundskeeping role at Pease Pottage, but it was probably in the early 1920s. From 1924 to 1934 he was responsible for the playing surfaces at the Crawley Bowling and Tennis Clubs, the former being considered under his care "among the best in the County of their kind". During this period, in 1932, he also advised Three Bridges Cricket Club in Crawley on how to re-lay their pitch, provided coaching services in 1937, and continued to contribute his groundskeeping skills to the club during World War II, in March 1942 agreeing again to supervise their wickets.

Cordingley's previous dedication as a groundsman for Pease Pottage Cricket Club was recalled many years later by a local sports journalist who had gone to Cordingley's house on a rainy November day to interview the old pro, only to be told that by Mrs Cordingley that her husband was not at home – he was up at the cricket ground working. The writer eventually found Cordingley out on the cricket ground "wearing a stove-pipe hat, his body enveloped in a cape and a sack, sitting on other sacks and weeding with a table fork". The club legend explained, "it's no use doing this in the dry weather, you can't get all the weed out."

== Demise of Pease Pottage Cricket Club ==
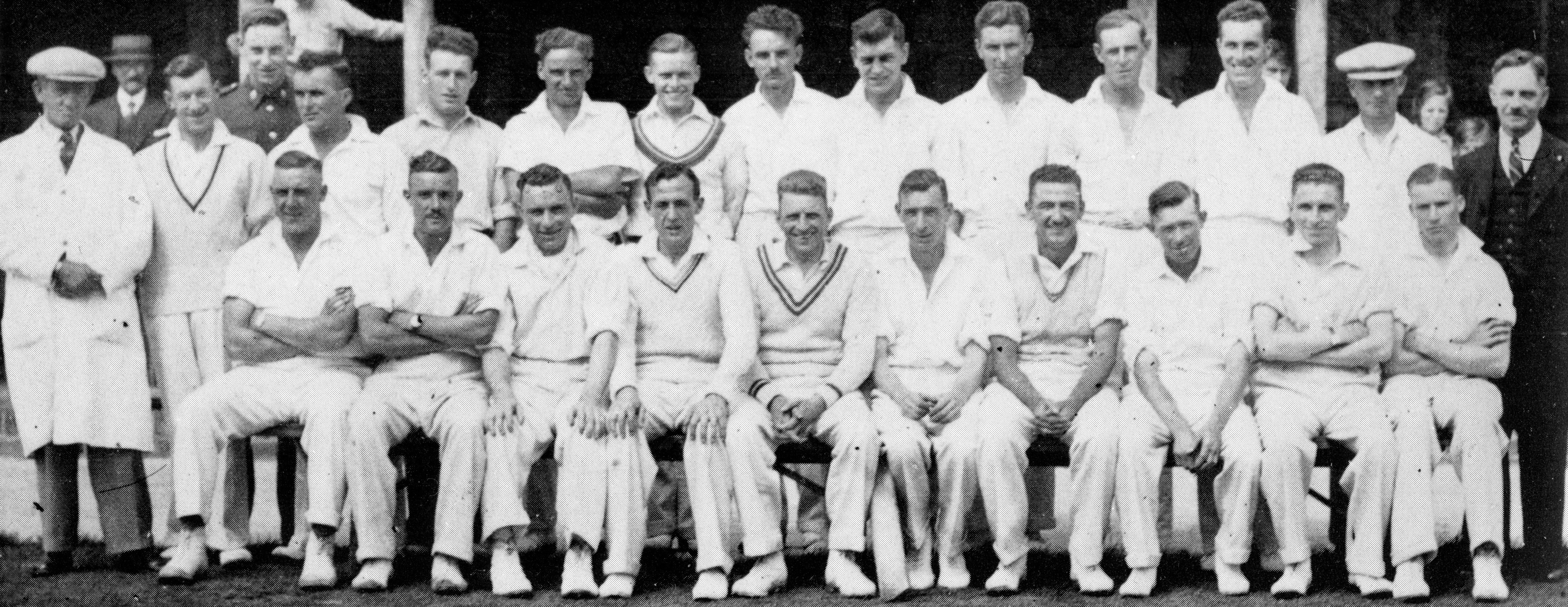
Crawley v. Peas Pottage Cricket Match, 12 August 1939. Cordingley at left, umpire.

One of Cordingley's final matches as an umpire for Pease Pottage Cricket Club took place on Saturday, 12 August 1939, when the small village side travelled to face neighbouring market town Crawley. The match result, a heavy 79-run defeat for the visitors, was portentous; 22 days later World War II broke out, sounding the death knell for his beloved club, which was to perish in a particularly heartbreaking fashion for the former groundsman early the following year. On 26 January 1940, during a meeting of members held at The Grapes Inn in Pease Pottage, it was announced that the club was to be wound up. The club's ground, owned by the Tilgate Estate, had been sold off to Slaugham Parish Council, with the land to be ploughed up for use as rent-free allotments for the war effort, and many of its members had already joined the armed forces making it "impossible to carry on". The meeting also decided to offer a gift to Cordingley in recognition of his long service to the club as umpire and coach. In a follow-up meeting held in April 1940 at The Grapes, the long-time club servant received this gift: a cheque so that he could buy a present for himself, because "during his career [he] has collected so many presents that it is difficult to purchase anything for him without duplication." It was also announced that since only a part of the ground had so far been ploughed up but the pitch was still intact, and the club still had £5 in hand, it would make an attempt to continue, playing games on Sundays. This attempt however failed, no doubt due to wartime constraints, and the minutes of the April meeting remained forever unsigned because the members never met again.

After the war, in May 1948, the club tried to re-form, and in October 1948 sought permission to play at Handcross Recreation Field, but nothing tangible seems to have come of this. Four years later, in May 1952, the former cricket ground in Pease Pottage, by then owned by the Tilgate Forest Hotel, came up for discussion in local parish council meetings as a possible venue for future games and recreation facilities amid fears that it might otherwise be redeveloped, but it was decided to take no action. The council's fears were well-founded though and eventually the ground fell into use as a car breakers facility; as of 2023 it is known as G W Bridges Car Scrap Yard.

== Quirks of playing career ==
Cordingley's batting average for his 15-match first-class career was 5.22, and his best bowling record was 5–22.

He played for two first-class counties, Yorkshire and Sussex, but only played first-class cricket for Sussex. He was involved in three matches against Worcestershire, the first for Yorkshire in May 1898, and the other two for Sussex in 1902. Worcestershire was recognised as a first-class county in December 1898; if it had been recognised just six months earlier, Cordingley would have had first-class cricket records for both counties for whom he played.

== Other sports ==
Cordingley was an accomplished billiards player, being for example the "very popular" winner of a tournament at East Grinstead in January 1908, and entertaining members in an exhibition tournament at the Crawley British Legion in October 1934.

== Death ==
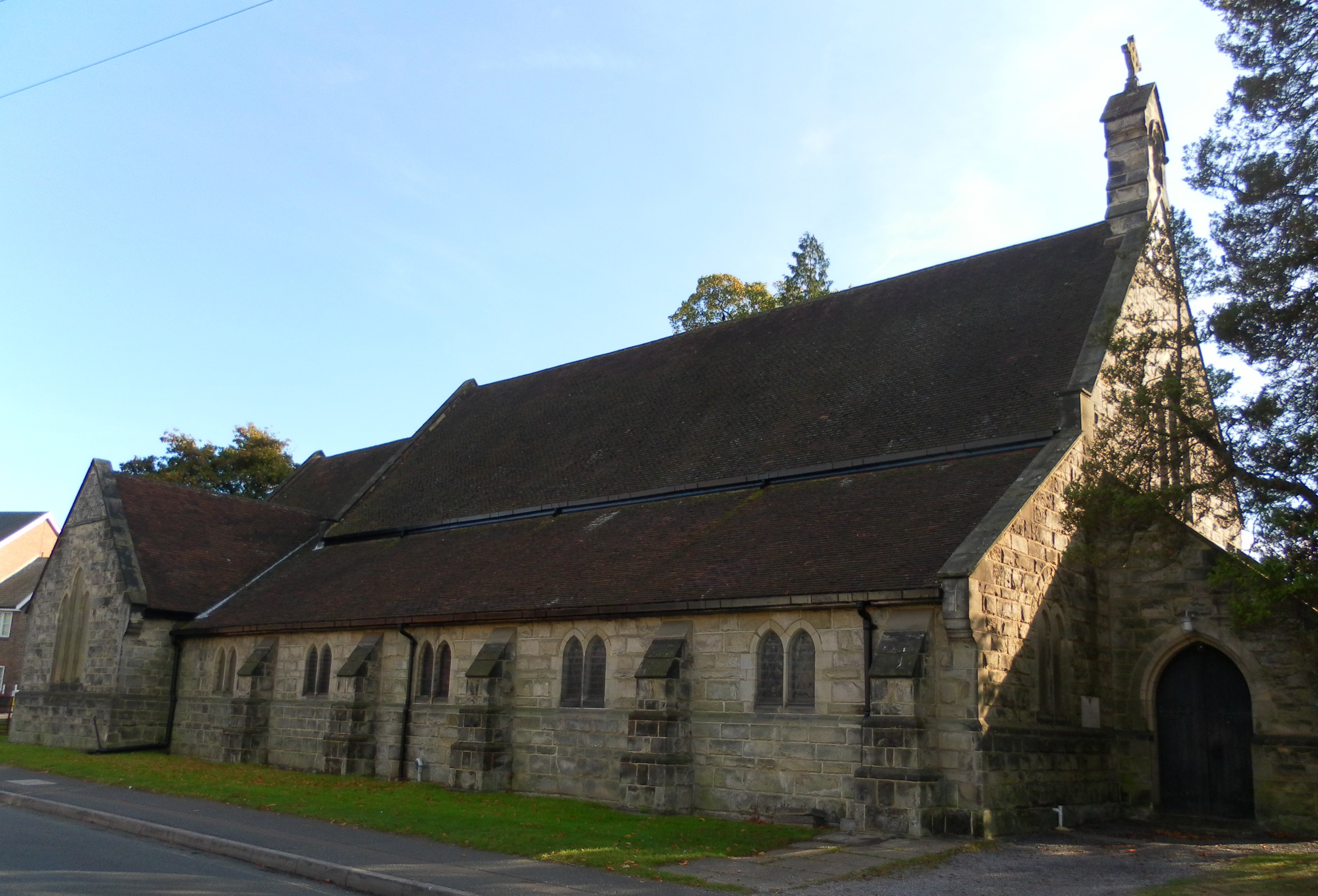
St Peter's Church, Crawley

Albert died from heart disease at Crawley and District Hospital, West Green, Crawley, not far from his home at 5 Saint Peter's Road, West Green, Crawley, Sussex, on 27 April 1945, aged 73. His funeral was held just a few yards away, between the hospital and his home, at Saint Peter's Church, West Green, Crawley three days later, on 30 April 1945, a date mistakenly reported in some sources as being that of his death. The mourners in attendance included his widow Cecilia and his daughters Christine and Kathleen.

== Legacy ==
A tribute article in a local Crawley newspaper described Cordingley as a "thorough gentlemen on and off the field" and recalled that the first wicket he ever took as a youth with the Eccleshill first team in the Bradford League was that of future Yorkshire opening batsman John Tunnicliffe, then playing for Pudsey, who would go on to score more than 20,000 first-class runs.

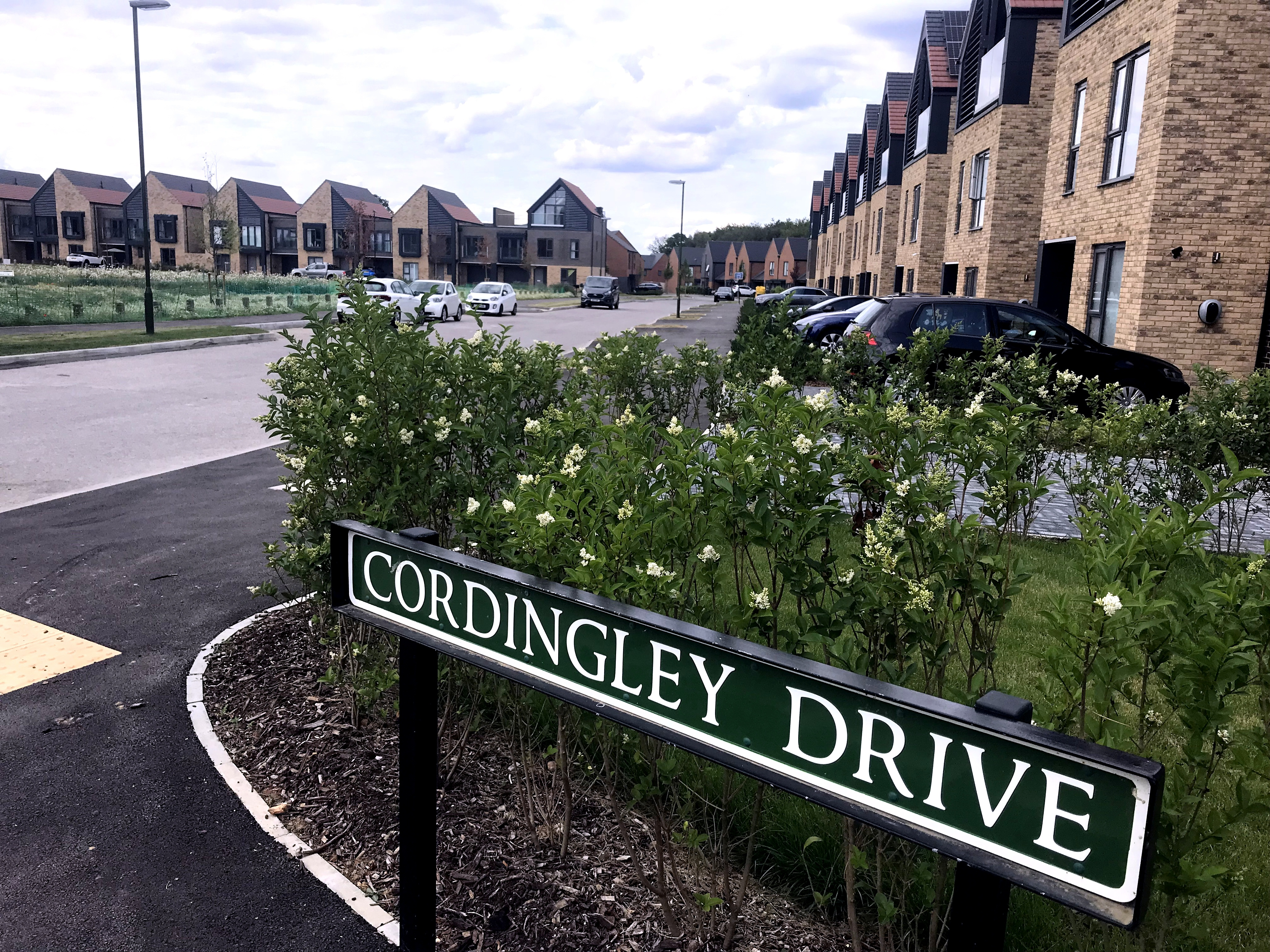
Cordingley Drive, Pease Pottage (June 2023)

While Albert and his wife Cecilia had no male children to carry on the cricketing tradition, the elder of their two daughters, Christine, born in 1896, married a Leeds doctor, Louis Gordon, who was also a passionate cricket fan. In 1948, he was one of the founding members and first chairman of an organisation which was to become the Northern Cricket Society (NCS). The NCS operates for the benefit of cricket fans in the north of England and 75 years after its founding still organises several speakers evenings every year held in the Long Room at Headingley Cricket Ground, an annual dinner, an annual Boxing Day charity cricket match, and an annual booklet.

A new street in Pease Pottage was named after Albert Cordingley in 2020, 75 years after his death. Cordingley Drive forms part of a large new development called Woodgate of over 600 homes, parkland, and a school at Pease Pottage that was originally approved in 2017 by Mid Sussex District Council. The drive – surely an appropriate name for a street named after a cricketer, even if Albert Cordingley was primarily a bowler – runs from the new village green to the south-east boundary of the development, on land that was formerly Hardriding Farm, Brighton Road, Pease Pottage.

== Sussex First-class playing record ==
Matches: played 15, won 3, drew 11, lost 1

Bowling: 189.3 overs, 43 maidens, 546 runs, 16 wickets, best bowling 5–22, average 34.12, 5 wickets 1, 10 wickets 0, strike rate 71.06, economy 2.88

Batting, 14 innings, 5 not out, 47 runs, highest score 24, average 5.22, hundreds 0, fifties, 0

Fielding, 9 catches (including 1 caught and bowled)
