= Wiseton =

Village and civil parish in Nottinghamshire, England

Coordinates: 53.401055°N 0.923095°W

- Village and civil parish
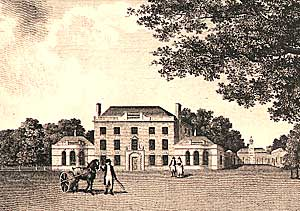
- Wiseton Hall, c.1790

- Location within Nottinghamshire
- Interactive map of Wiseton
- Area: 1.64 sq mi (4.2 km^{2})
- Population: 109 (2021)
  - Density: 66/sq mi (25/km^{2})
- OS grid reference: SK 717898
  - London: 135 mi (217 km) SSE
- District: Bassetlaw
- Shire county: Nottinghamshire
- Region: East Midlands
- Country: England
- Sovereign state: United Kingdom
- Settlements: Wiseton; New Wiseton
- Post town: Doncaster
- Postcode district: DN10
- Dialling code: 01777
- Police: Nottinghamshire
- Fire: Nottinghamshire
- Ambulance: East Midlands
- UK Parliament: Bassetlaw

Wiseton is a small village, country estate and civil parish, Nottinghamshire, England, situated between the villages of Gringley-on-the-Hill and Everton, approximately 5.6 miles (9.0 km) southeast of Bawtry and 7.7 miles (12.4 km) west of Gainsborough. There is also a nearby hamlet called New Wiseton. The Chesterfield Canal flows nearby, and there are several bridges in the vicinity. 109 residents were recorded for the 2021 census.

== History ==
The earlier hall was built in 1771 and was demolished in 1960. The estate belonged to the Acklom family before belonging to the wealthy aristocratic Spencer family. In 1832, the country estate at Wiseton covered 930 acres, 872 of which belonged at the time to John Spencer, 3rd Earl Spencer of Althorp. Spencer owned Holbein, Barlow and Caravaggio paintings at the "handsome" house.

At the time of John Marius Wilson's Imperial Gazetteer of England and Wales (1870–72), Wiseton had a population of 124 people with 24 houses.

Wiseton Hall was the home of Sir Joseph Laycock in the late 19th and early 20th century. Fronting the Hall during this period and surrounded by beautiful flower beds was a cricket ground "unequalled for its position in any shire", at one time maintained by professional cricketer Albert Cordingley, who also played for the Wiseton team in the 1899 season, taking over 100 wickets. Cricketer Harry Elliott was also once employed here. Richard Budge, former owner of RJB Mining, lived at the Hall.

== See also ==
- Listed buildings in Wiseton

== Gallery ==
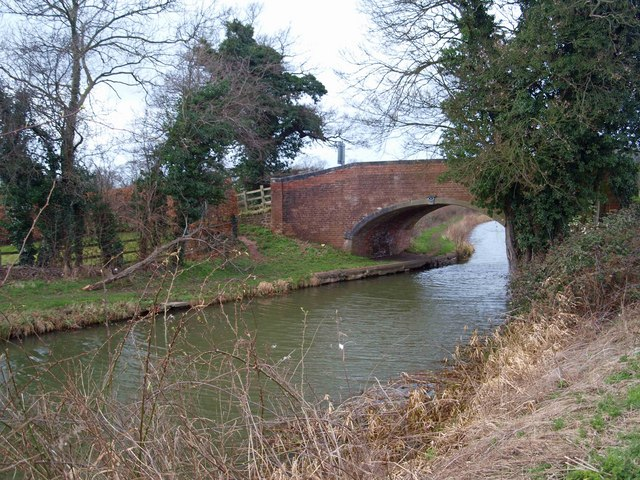
Bridge 71 on the Chesterfield Canal near Wiseton

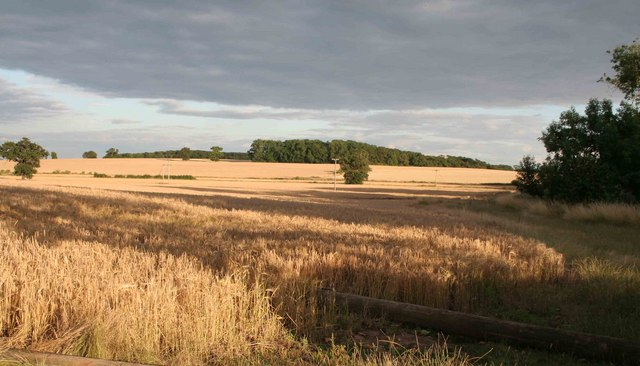
Corn fields near Wiseton

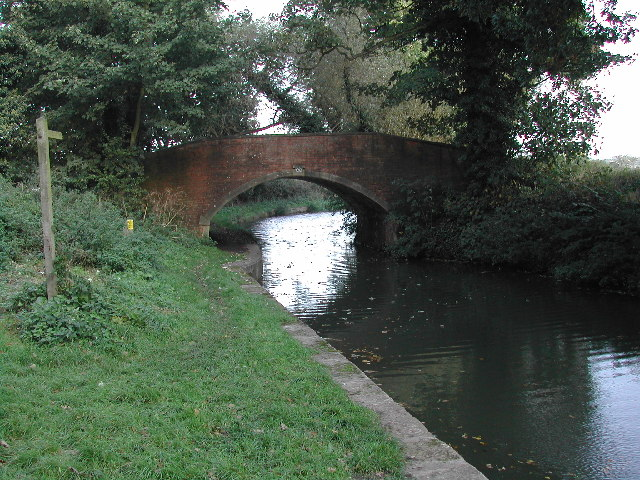
Wiseton Top Bridge

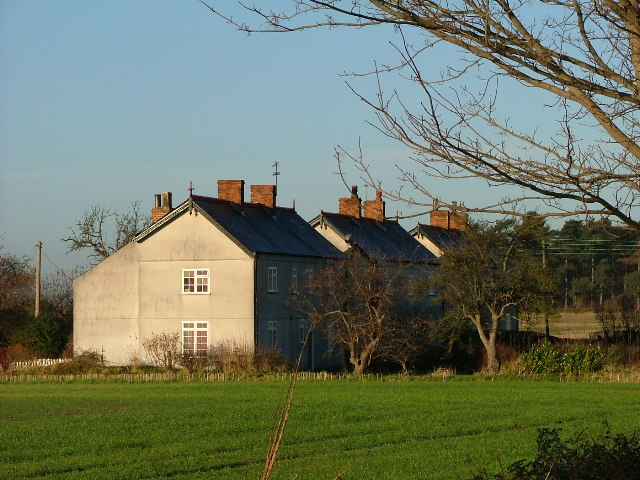
Cottages in New Wiseton
