= 99th Regiment of Foot (1794) =

Infantry regiment of the British Army

The 99th Regiment of Foot was an infantry regiment of the British Army, raised on 10 February 1794 by Lieutenant-Colonel Stuart Douglas (died 30 Jun 1795) and numbered as the 99th Foot in October of the same year.

Douglas was succeeded as commanding officer by Lieutenant-Colonel William Gardiner. Lieutenant-Colonel James Smith Baillie took command in September 1794 and Lieutenant-Colonel Christopher Tilson took command in November 1794.

Between April and July 1794, the regiment was stationed on the Isle of Man.

The regiment was dispatched to the West Indies, serving in San Domingo and taking part in the capture of the Dutch colony of Demerara in 1796. They were disbanded in Demerara in 1796, with the men drafted into the 39th (Dorsetshire) Regiment of Foot.
