= John Spencer, 3rd Earl Spencer =

British statesman (1782–1845)

The Right Honourable The Earl Spencer PC DL FRS
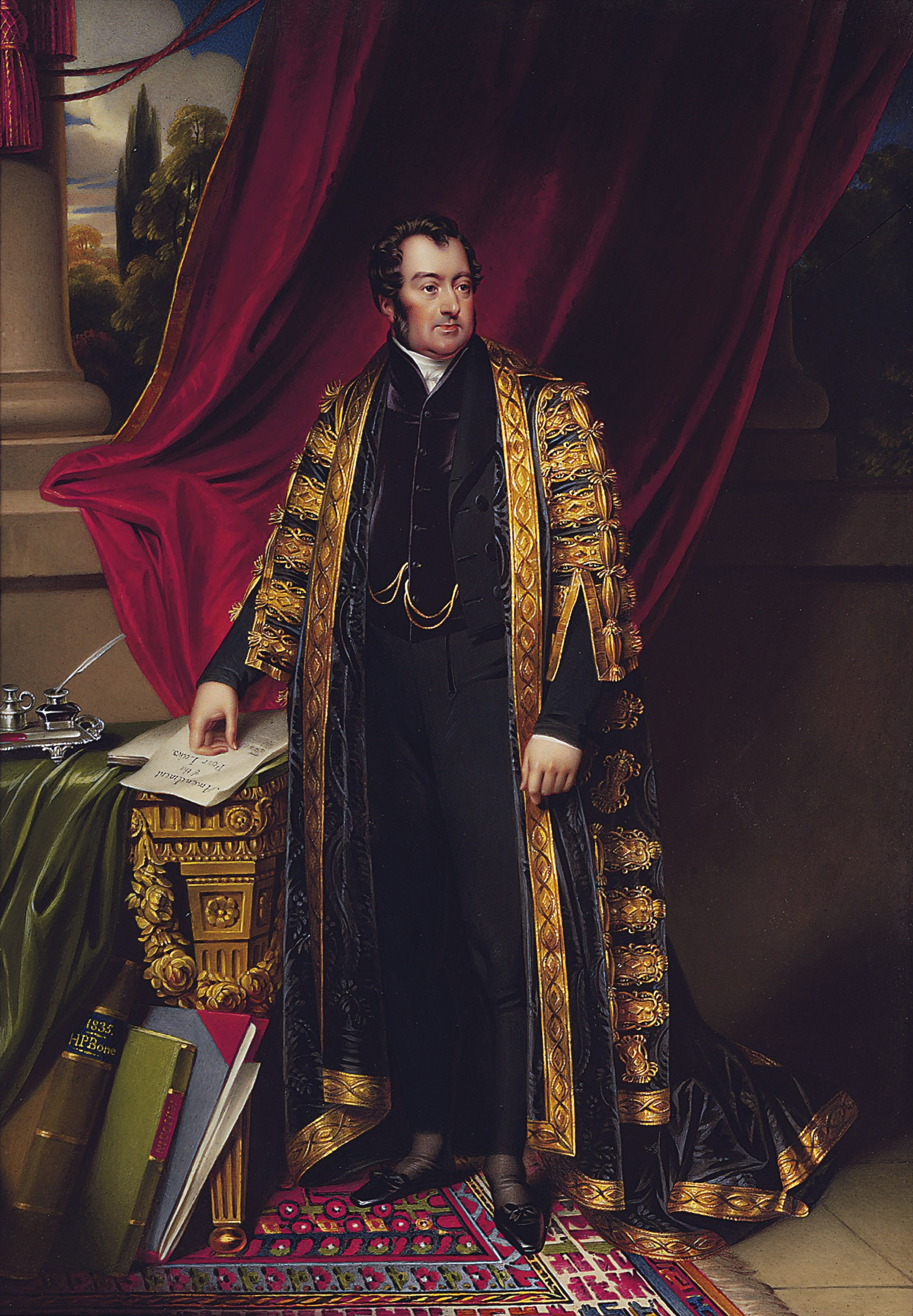
- Portrait by Henry Pierce Bone, 1835

Chancellor of the Exchequer
- In office 22 November 1830 – 14 November 1834
- Prime Minister: The Earl Grey; The Viscount Melbourne
- Preceded by: Henry Goulburn
- Succeeded by: Sir Robert Peel

Leader of the House of Commons
- In office 22 November 1830 – 10 November 1834
- Prime Minister: The Earl Grey; The Viscount Melbourne
- Preceded by: Sir Robert Peel
- Succeeded by: Lord John Russell

Personal details
- Born: 30 May 1782 St James's, Middlesex, England
- Died: 1 October 1845 (aged 63) Wiseton, Nottinghamshire, England
- Party: Whig
- Spouse: Esther Acklom (m. 1814; died 1818)
- Parent(s): George Spencer, 2nd Earl Spencer; Lady Lavinia Bingham
- Education: Trinity College, Cambridge

John Charles Spencer, 3rd Earl Spencer, PC, DL, FRS (30 May 1782 – 1 October 1845), styled Viscount Althorp from 1783 to 1834, was a British statesman. He was Chancellor of the Exchequer under Lord Grey and Lord Melbourne from 1830 to 1834. Due to his reputation for integrity, he was nicknamed "Honest Jack".

== Family and early years ==
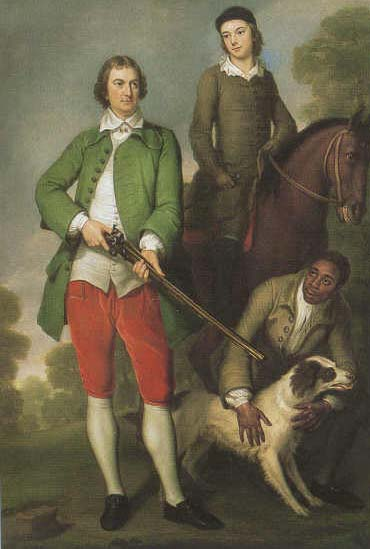
Portrait of Spencer's father and grandfather (with gun), by George Knapton, c. 1744

His father George Spencer, 2nd Earl Spencer had served in the ministries of Pitt the Younger, Charles James Fox and Lord Grenville, and was First Lord of the Admiralty (1794–1801). George Spencer was married to the eldest daughter of Lord Lucan. Their eldest son, John Charles, was born at Spencer House, London, on 30 May 1782. In 1800, after Harrow, he took up his residence at Trinity College, Cambridge, and for some time applied himself energetically to mathematical studies; but he spent most of his time in hunting and racing. He was appointed a deputy lieutenant of Northamptonshire on 5 June 1803.

In 1804, he entered parliament as a member for Okehampton in Devon. He vacated his seat in 1806, to contest the University of Cambridge against Lord Henry Petty and Lord Palmerston (when he was hopelessly beaten), but he was elected that same year for St Albans, and appointed a lord of the treasury. At the general election in November 1806, he was elected for Northamptonshire, and he continued to sit for the county until he succeeded to the peerage. For the next few years after this speech, Lord Althorp occasionally spoke in debates and was always on the side of Liberalism, but from 1813 to 1818 he was only rarely in the House of Commons. His absence was partly due to a feeling that it was hopeless to struggle against the will of the Tory ministry, but more particularly because of the death of his wife.

== Leader of the Commons ==
In 1819, on his return to political life, he pressed for establishing a more efficient bankruptcy court, and of expediting the recovery of small debts; and he saw both these reforms accomplished before 1825. During the greater part of the reign of George IV, the Whigs lost their influence in the state from their want of cohesion, but this defect was soon remedied in 1830 when Lord Althorp was chosen their leader in the lower house, and his capacity for the position was proved by experience. In Lord Grey's government Althorp was both Leader of the House of Commons and Chancellor of the Exchequer. He was instrumental in the success of the government measures. Along with Lord John Russell, he led the fight to pass the Reform Bill of 1832, making more than twenty speeches. It was also under Spencer's leadership and consistent lobbying that the House of Commons abolished slavery throughout the British Empire in 1833.

== The Lords ==
After the dissolution of 1833, the Whig government had been slowly dying, and was further weakened by Althorp's promotion to the House of Lords following the death of his father in 1834. The new Lord Spencer abandoned the cares of office and returned to country life with unalloyed delight. Henceforth agriculture, not politics, was his principal interest. He was a notable cattle breeder and the first president of the Royal Agricultural Society which was founded in 1838, the year he paid homage to Queen Victoria at her Coronation. Though often urged by his political friends to come to their assistance, he rarely quit the peaceful pleasures which he loved. He died without issue at Wiseton on 1 October 1845, and was succeeded by his brother Frederick (died 1857).

== Reputation and legacy ==
The Whigs required, to carry the Reform Bill, a leader above party spirit. "Honest Jack Althorp" has been called "the most decent man who ever held high Government office". Although he was not a particularly good public speaker, his integrity was an invaluable asset to the Government. Henry Hardinge, 1st Viscount Hardinge said that one of John Wilson Croker's speeches was demolished by the simple statement of Lord Althorp that he "had collected some figures which entirely refuted it, but had lost them." To Croker's credit, he replied that he would never doubt Althorp's word.

Spencer Street in Melbourne, is named in his honour.

== Marriage ==
On 13 April 1814, Spencer married Esther Acklom (September 1788 – 11 June 1818) at Upper Brook Street, Mayfair, London. Cokayne quotes from the Farington Diaries, "in marrying He complied with the wishes of Lord and Lady Spencer, it was not of His own seeking" and from the Letter Bag of Lady Elizabeth Spencer-Stanhope, "since Jack Althorp would not propose to her, she proposed to him; and such an unusual proceeding was fraught with happy consequences ... his devotion after marriage amply compensated for his lack of ardour before." Esther died on 11 June 1818 at the age of 29 at Halkin Street, Belgravia, London, England, in childbirth and she was buried on 18 June 1818 in Brington, Northamptonshire, England. John was said to be deeply upset by his wife's death and was devoted to her memory for the rest of his life: he resolved never to remarry, and it is said that he gave up hunting, his favourite pastime, to mark the depth of his loss.

== Coat of arms ==
Coat of arms of John Spencer, 3rd Earl Spencer
Coronet A Coronet of an Earl Crest Out of a Ducal Coronet Or a Griffin's Head Azure gorged with a Bar Gemelle Gules between two Wings expanded of the second Escutcheon Quarterly Argent and Gules in the 2nd and 3rd quarters a Fret Or over all on a Bend Sable three Escallops of the first Supporters Dexter: A Griffin per fess Ermine and Erminois gorged with a Collar Sable the edges flory-counterflory and chained of the last and on the Collar three Escallops Argent; Sinister: A Wyvern Erect on his tail Ermine similarly collared and chained Motto Dieu Defend Le Droit (God defend the right)

== Ancestry ==
Ancestors of John Spencer, 3rd Earl Spencer

8. Hon. John Spencer
4. John Spencer, 1st Earl Spencer
9. Lady Georgiana Caroline Carteret
2. George Spencer, 2nd Earl Spencer
10. Rt Hon. Stephen Poyntz
5. Margaret Georgiana Poyntz
11. Maria Mordaunt
1. John Spencer, 3rd Earl Spencer
12. Sir John Bingham, fifth Baronet
6. Rt Hon. Charles Bingham, first Earl of Lucan
13. Anne Vesey
3. Lady Lavinia Bingham
14. James Smith
7. Margaret Smith
15. Grace Dyke

Parliament of the United Kingdom
Preceded by Francis Dickins	Member of Parliament for Northamptonshire; 1806–1832	constituency abolished
New constituency	Member of Parliament for South Northamptonshire; 1832–1834	Succeeded by Sir Charles Knightley
Political offices
Preceded by Henry Goulburn	Chancellor of the Exchequer; 1830–1834	Succeeded by Sir Robert Peel, Bt
Preceded by Sir Robert Peel	Leader of the House of Commons; 1830–1834	Succeeded by Lord John Russell
Party political offices
First None recognised before	Whig Leader in the Commons; 1830–1834	Succeeded by Lord John Russell
Peerage of Great Britain
Preceded by George John Spencer	Earl Spencer; 1834–1845	Succeeded by Frederick Spencer
