= Broomfields, Bradford =

District of Bradford in West Yorkshire, England

Coordinates: 53.789°N 1.747°W

Fig.1 Broomfields, Bradford in West Yorkshire

Broomfields is a historic district on the south eastern edge of Bradford, West Yorkshire, England. In 1840 it was still a mainly rural area with a population of only a few hundred people. By 1880 it was one of the most densely populated districts of Bradford with 1,500 houses, a population of about 8,000 and many commercial premises. In 1932 a process of slum clearance and commercial regeneration was started. Today (2014) the district is almost wholly given over to commercial premises and once again has a resident population of only about two hundred people.

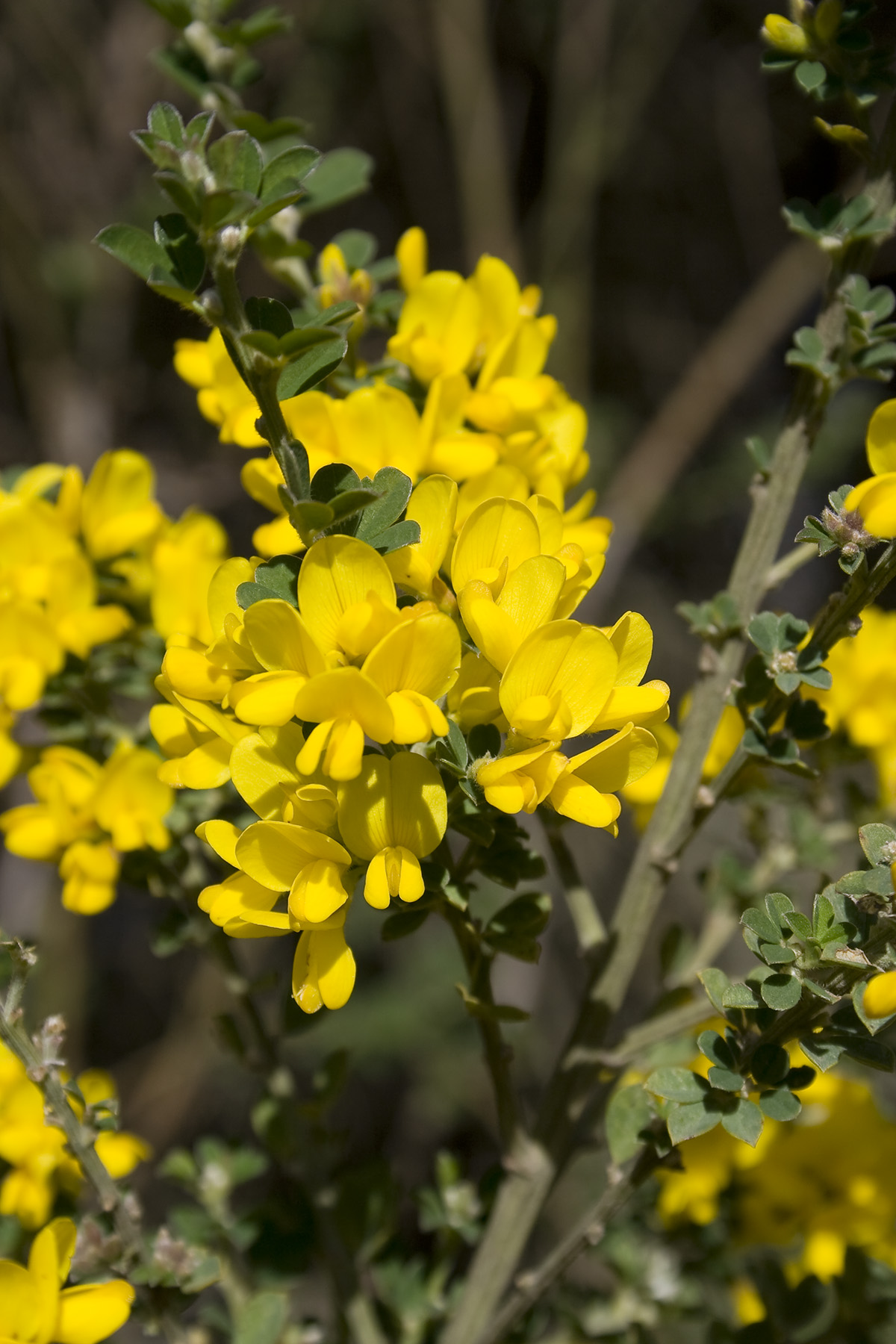
Fig 2 Flowering Broom gave its name to the district

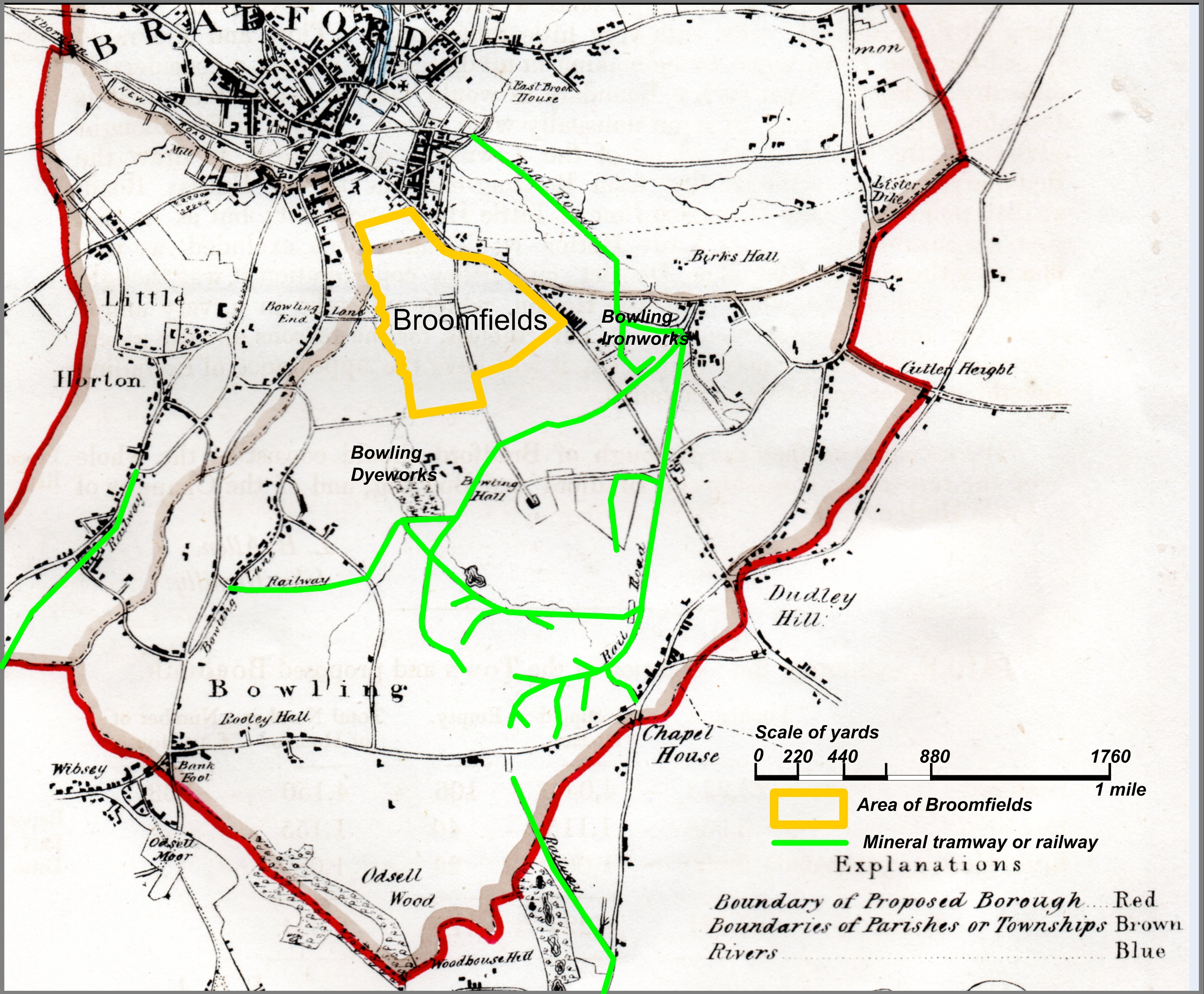
Fig.3 Broomfields 1831– within the new parliamentary borough

== Location, origins and early history ==
Broomfields was never an administrative area but rather a geographical expression. The northernmost part, a small area once referred to as "The Broom Closes", was in the township of Bradford. Most of Broomfields was within the township of Bowling. (From 1882 the ward of West Bowling and East Bowling.) The eastern boundary followed Wakefield Road. The western boundary was marked by Manchester Road – which also formed part of the boundary of the township of Horton. The southern limit of the area was the small estate of "Broom Hall". To the east of Broomhall the southern boundary was not precisely defined but approximated to the northern limit of "Spring Fields".

Despite the difficulties of indeterminate boundaries the area had a certain unity of geography and a shared history of economic development. It is composed of reasonably gentle north and west facing slopes, draining to Bowling Beck. The thin clay soils were unsuitable for arable farming and anciently had formed part of the wastes. By the late 17th century most of the land had been divided into "closes" for pastoral use. Flowering broom flourished on the poor soils and gave its name to the district. From an early date Broomfields provided the people of Bradford with country walks and the opportunity of catching trout in the becks. The water of the Lady Well was highly regarded for its curative properties and the spring was a place of resort on holidays. From 1774 with the opening of the Bradford Canal this idyllic picture started to change, though very slowly, as the coal and iron deposits were worked on a commercial scale.

In the last decade of the 18th century Sir Francis Lindley Wood (owner of Bolling Hall and Lord of the manor) sunk coal mines in Broomfields – much of which was part of his extensive estates. He delegated management of the mines to his energetic land agent, Isaac Wright. Isaac Wright only operated the New Heigh pit directly (It provided Sir Francis with a profit of £1200 pa.) and sub let other mines to "pit takers". There is evidence that by about 1800 he had opened a coal staithe in Bridge Street, Bradford, which was supplied from the Broomfield mines. Broomfield Colliery was at the junction of Hall Lane and Wakefield road close to the ancient "Wheatsheaf" public house. A group of single storey coal miner's houses of this period (see Fig. 14.1) still survive. In 1801 Sir Francis moved from Bolling Hall to another of his houses at Hemsworth. From 1803 most of the mineral rights of Sir Francis's estates were leased or sold piecemeal to the Bowling Iron Works. In 1794 Sir Francis leased 93 acres of ironstone in Hall Lane to them. In February 1816 he sold all his remaining landholdings and mineral rights in Bowling and Bradford to the iron works. In 1821 the ironworks also bought the lordship of the manor with the manorial lands and mineral rights.

Fig. 3 is based on a map of 1831 drawn up for the parliamentary committee tasked with deciding the boundaries of the new parliamentary boroughs proposed by the Reform Bill. The district of Broomfields has been overdrawn. Broomfields was about 970 yards from North to South and a maximum of 860 yards east to west amounting in total to about 130 acres. The map shows that in 1831 the area contained almost no buildings except a thin scattering along its Wakefield Road boundary. To the south east was the Bowling Ironworks with its growing network of mineral tramways. The ironworks had a major influence on the economic history of Broomfields. To the south are shown Bowling Dye Works and Bolling Hall with its access road "Bolling Hall Lane" running through Broomfields with the only other lane in Broomfields – "Mill Lane" running at right angles to it. The "mill" referred to was not a textile mill but the very ancient water powered manorial "Bowling corn mills". The only steam powered textile mill in Broomfields in 1831 was the "Prospect Mill" in Wakefield Road built in 1819 by the Bowling Iron Works company for letting out on a "room and power" basis.

Amongst the first lessees was Mr G.W Addison who in Hall Lane "built for his residence a fine house .... which he surrounded with gardens, green houses etc" Mr Addison set (or possibly confirmed – as his house was next to the older but even grander Hall Field) a fashion for building fine houses in Hall Lane. By 1849 Woodsley House, Springfield Lodge (239 Hall Lane), the unnamed house known only as No 223 and the 8 rather grand town houses of Broomfield Terrace had been built. No 237 Hall Lane (Fig 14.2) followed in 1851. The final house in the series, Windrush House, No 2 Hall Lane, was built as late as 1868. It was built for Dr Samuel Lodge on part of the garden of Mr Addison's house – which in 1864 had become the vicarage of St. Luke's church. All these houses, except Springfield Lodge, were in the classical style. Springfield Lodge had gothic elements.

Despite the mine-workings Broomfields in 1840 still had a largely rural aspect. To the west Caledonia, Waterloo and Britannia Mills had been built alongside Bowling Beck on the boundary of Broomfields. A few collieries were still in production and in the early 1840s the Bowling Ironworks built a tramway through Broomfields to transport coal from outlying mines to a new staithe "The Bradford Coal Depot" next to Britannia Mill. In 1838 The Bowling Iron Works Company built Victoria Mill on the southern boundary of Broomfields, also for letting out on a "room and power" basis. In 1843 Mr G.W Addison built Broomfields's third textile mill "Hall Lane Mills". Prospect Mill was purchased from the Bowling Ironworks by the Cole, Marchant and Morley partnership, who obtained additional land for "Prospect Foundry". Mr Marchant had previously been finance manager at the Bowling Iron Works.

Prospect Foundry established a flourishing business in domestic ironware: its black iron kitchen ranges were installed in many Bradford houses of the Victorian period. It also developed an engineering business: its steam engines powered many Bradford mills and could be still found at work during the 1960s. Other foundries and engineering works soon followed. Benjamin Berry and Co set up an engineering company in a part of Prospect Mill. In 1853 they built Ladywell Foundry in Hall Lane. Berry's were joined by "St Dunstan's Machine Tool Manufactury" and the Mill Lane Foundry.

Next to Prospect foundry a large area was occupied by Prospect Sawmills. The timber company had been founded in 1811 as Thorpe and Terry – later Thorpe, Terry and Schofield and from 1874 J.E Schofield. The sawmills continued working into the second half of the 20th century.

George Oddy, rope maker, was supplying haulage and winding ropes to the Bowling Iron works in 1789. Messrs. Oddy's rope walks at 235 Hall Lane continued in production into the second half of the 20th century.

== Industrialisation and urbanisation after 1850 ==
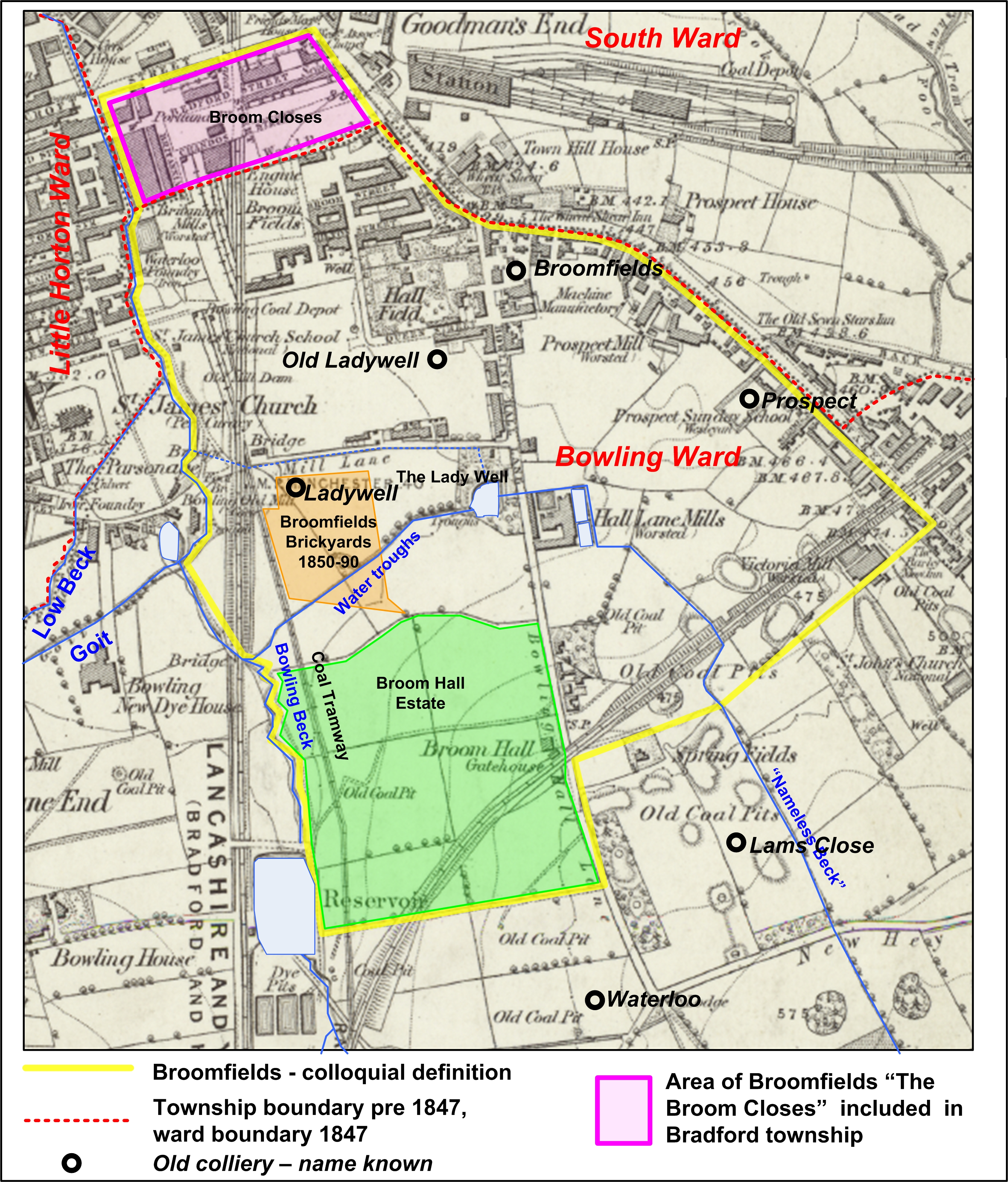
Fig 4 Broomfields in 1849 with railways as at 1854

In 1847 The Municipal Borough of Bradford received its charter. The new borough incorporated the former townships of Bradford, Bowling, Horton and Manningham. The borough was divided into 8 wards: Manningham, North, South, East, West, Little Horton, Great Horton and Bowling. Wherever possible the new ward boundaries followed the old township boundaries. A small area of Broomfields adjacent to Croft Street was included in South Ward. The remainder became part of Bowling Ward. In 1882 Bowling Ward was split into the wards of East and West Bowling. The Broomfields district became a part of East Bowling. Throughout all these and subsequent boundary changes the name "Broomfields" has remained in use. Successive cartographers have differed as to where "Broomfields" should be centred on the map.

In 1846 construction of the West Riding Junction (later the Lancashire and Yorkshire) railway started. It was opened in 1850 with a terminus at Drake Street station (approached via Broomfields tunnel) in the centre of Bradford. Thereafter urban development in Broomfields was very rapid – as was further expansion of the railway network. The railways changed what were the perceived boundaries of Broomfields. The Lancashire and Yorkshire line became accepted as the western boundary. In 1854 the GNR opened its line from Leeds to a terminus station at Adolphus Street. At the same time the GNR opened its "Bradford Avoiding Line" through the southern part of Broomfields to a junction with the L&Y line just to the south of Bowling Dyeworks. This line was soon recognised as the southern boundary. of Broomfields. These features are shown on Fig. 4 – a 6" to the mile Ordnance Survey Map surveyed in 1849, first published 1852 but updated to show new railways to 1854.

In 1866 the L&YR built the Parma Street coal yards to the west of the main line. In 1867 the GNR opened the "Bowling Curves Railway from a junction near Hammerton Street to a junction with the L&Y at Mill Lane. The GNR then ran its passenger trains into Drake Street, now renamed Exchange. To deal with the increased traffic the Broomfield tunnel was opened out into a wide cutting, occupying much of the area of the former Broom Closes. The area south of Croft Street became entirely given over to sidings and goods sheds. The GNR converted Adolphus Street station into a goods shed and added further coal yards and sidings. Subsequently Bradford Corporation built a new cattle market and wholesale green fish and meat markets, all served by GNR lines. In the mid 1870s work started on the Thornton Railway, with connections to the GNR and L&YR lines near Mill Lane. The line was opened in 1878 with a new station "St Dunstan's Junction" in Broomfields. By 1883 the Thornton railway had been extended through to Halifax and Keighley. By this time Broomfields was almost totally surrounded by railways, sidings and goods yards and with a railway through the middle

Census returns show that the railways and their associated works provided much employment for the people of Broomfields. . They provided another unexpected employment bonus. In 1850 a small brickworks was established next to the L&Y line to use material excavated from the Bowling-Low Moor tunnel – which had been dumped by the line side. In 1860 S. Pearson & Son re-established the "Broomfield Brickworks" on a much larger scale at the same location . Successive railway works provided brick making material for the next 30 years. Other sources of supply were drawn on.

Many commercial premises were built in Broomfields in the second half of the 19th century. In 1863 Ladywell Foundry was expanded and became Ladywell Mills. At the same time Globe Mills were built on the opposite side of Hall Lane close to Hall Lane Mills. All these mills were built for renting out on a room and power basis. Ladywell usually had three main tenants, each renting one of the three mill buildings. The 1912 Street directory lists the tenants as J&C Crabtree, Ltd commission wool comber, Ladywell Slubbing & Combing Co, and J.W Firth Ltd commission wool combers. Firths are still (2014) in occupation. At the same date Globe Mills had as tenants J & W Lister & Sons, worsted yarn spinners and the Bradford Steel Pin Manufacturing Co. Ltd. Later in the 20th century Globe mills was occupied by metal manufacturing and engineering companies – but no textile companies. The same directory states that Hall Lane Mills was solely occupied by W.H Wilkinson and Son, cabinet makers, who had occupied the premises since about 1880. Another "Prospect Mill" (in Usher Street) had also abandoned textiles and was occupied by Jas. Burroughs and Sons, wood-turners. Textile industries seemed not to flourish in Broom Fields so well as engineering and the furniture and timber trades. One of the biggest industrial sites in Broomfields in 1912 was the Prospect Saw Mills (founded 1811) – next to Prospect Foundry.

== Working class houses after 1850 ==
Completion of the L&Y railway in 1850 also signalled the start of a boom in the building of working-class houses in Broomfields. There were at that time in Bradford no building regulations or planning control. By 1855 about 500 houses plus about 65 "cellar dwellings" had been built in the area north of Mill Lane between Hall Lane and the railway. Another 200 were built to the East of Hall Lane so that by 1855 a total of about 700 working-class houses had been built – virtually all of them "back to back". Nearly all the houses were "one up and one down" with shared privies. Where the slope permitted the houses had cellar dwellings built beneath them. Fig 5 shows a block of this sort in Sturges Street, numbered 9–59. There were 22 one up/one down back to backs with 11 cellar dwellings underneath them The 33 dwellings shared 12 privies. Each cellar dwelling had only one room of about 115sq ft. The 1861 census reports that most of these subterranean dwellings were occupied by a family – some with a lodger. Despite many attempts by the council officials to clear out and close cellar dwellings all those in Sturges Street were still occupied at the time of the 1911 census.

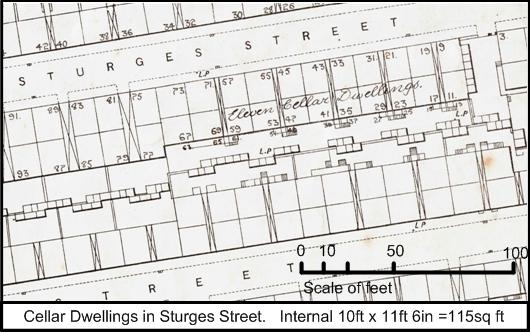
Fig 5 Cellar dwellings in Sturges Street built c 1854

.

In 1854 Bradford council introduced its first Building Bylaw. All building plans had to be submitted for approval to the Building and Improvement Committee. Minimum space, ventilation and sanitary standards had to be met. Cellar dwellings were banned. The next stage of working-class house building had to conform to the bylaw. About 65 such houses were built in Berry Street, Maw Street and Hall Lane. In 1859 Mr Hird completed a group of another 60 houses in Hall Lane, Hird Street and Lavinia street: They were back to back one up/one downs but each house had a garden containing a privy and an internal water supply.

In 1860 the council introduced a more stringent bylaw which effectively banned the building of back-to-back houses. Housing starts in the borough fell from about 1200 a year to 200. There was a hiatus in Broomfield house building. The speculative builders started a political campaign to have the 1860 by-law rescinded. Henry Ripley, perhaps as a riposte to the builders, embarked on construction of his "model village" of Ripley Ville on the site of the old Broomhall Estate. By 1868 he had completed a "very handsome" school and 196 houses. These were all 4 bedroom through houses, with front gardens and rear yards, with between 5 and 7 habitable rooms. The smallest Ripley Ville house was about three times the size of a "one up/one down".

After a bitterly fought municipal election in 1865 (in which the chairman of the Building and Improvement Committee lost his seat) Bradford Council introduced a revised building bylaw in 1866. This again allowed building of back to backs but imposed very stringent standards for space, ventilation sanitation and paving. The typical houses built under this bylaw were "tunnel back to backs". They had 2 or 3 bedrooms and usually a "side scullery". The undeveloped plots were rapidly filled up. In 1870 a third Building Bylaw set minimum street widths. After 1870 no more planning applications for back to backs were approved but the Bradford builders had such a stock of approvals that back to backs were still being built into the 1890s. In the early 1870s a triangle of land between Rouse Fold, Prospect Foundry and the Bowling curves railway was filled by two new streets – Prospect Street and Oliver Street – lined with houses of this type. The 125 houses were the last significant example of Victorian house building in Broomfields. About 1,500 working-class houses and 65 cellar dwellings had been built in 25 years – but there was little space for further expansion.

== Chapels, churches and schools ==
The Wesleyan Methodists built the "Seven Stars" schoolroom in Wakefield Road in 1825. In 1847 the name was changed to Prospect School Room when it was felt inappropriate for a Methodist establishment to be named after a public house. In the late 1860s the Prospect Methodists decided to build a chapel on a grand scale. They bought a large site adjacent to the schoolroom but covered by the spoil heap of the former Prospect Colliery. Several members of the men's class worked for the Bowling Ironworks. They borrowed rails and equipment and built a tramway from the site to the Broomfields Brickworks. Over the space of a year or so they cleared the spoil heap, saving the building fund £350 and receiving from Mr Peason an undisclosed sum in exchange for the brick making materials. The chapel, with 750 seats and a schoolroom in the basement, was opened in 1871 at a cost £6,000. (See Fig 16.1) The old schoolroom became the Bowling Liberal Club.

Prospect was the second Methodist chapel to be built in Broomfields. The first, a rather smaller affair though in a very handsome classical style, was built by the Wesleyan Association on the corner of Croft Street and Bridge street in 1838. The site also included a Sunday School and a small graveyard.

St James' CofE Church in Manchester Road – actually in the Township of Horton – was built in 1838. It was the nearest place of Anglican worship to Broomfields. It had a school attached to the church which for some years was the only school available to Broomfield children. The first vicar "Parson Bull" was a leader of the "Ten hours movement" and an enthusiast for factory reform. He was very popular with the working classes and hated by the mill owners – who eventually forced him to leave Bradford.

The first CofE Church to open within Broomfields was St Lukes in Bolling Street. It was consecrated in 1862. The architects were Malinson & Healey. It had a Sunday school but no day school. The Sunday school at first met in the buildings of the Broomfields Industrial School (formally the Broom Fields Ragged School) on the opposite side of Bolling Street. During the vicariate of Rev James Gallie (1878–1881) a Sunday school building "perhaps one of the best schoolrooms in the town" was erected next to the church. The schoolroom still exists.(See Fig 16.2 )

In 1868 the Ripley Ville school was opened. Financed by Henry Ripley as part of his "model village" of Ripley Ville, it was run by the non denominational British and Foreign School Society. The school buildings were design by Andrews and Pepper. The CofE Church of St Bartholomew's in Ripley Ville with 740 sittings opened in 1872. The architects were T.H and F Healey, who also designed Our Lady and St James Church in Worsbrough. It was the last church of the "Ten churches building campaign" of the Bradford Church Building Society.

In 1880 the Bradford School Board commenced building a large group of schools in Usher Street. They are still in use.

In 1873 Rev Cannon Motler of the RC church of St Mary's Stott Hill built St Ann's School on a site between Guy Street and Edwards Street. This was the centre of an Irish population in Broomfields of about 2,500. The school soon had 650 pupils. In 1881 the district of Broomfields was separated from St Mary's. In 1882 the rector, Rev A. Puissant built a presbytery on the same site. St Ann's church was built 1889–90. The architect of all three buildings was Mr. Edward Simpson. The buildings form a most pleasing architectural group. (See Fig 16.3). St Ann's proved to be the last example of church and school building in Broomfields.

A couple of additional but unnamed non-conformist Sunday schools are shown on the late 19th century maps. In the early 20th century a "tin mission" appeared in Hall Lane. In the 1880s a 200-seat "Spiritualist Chapel" opened in Walton Street. Cannon Motler and his Methodist counterparts would not have classed it as a place of worship. By 1912 the building was in use as "The Irish National League Club". Its secretary was Edward O'Neil and its caretaker John Carrol. This use would have met with Canon Motler's approval

== The making of an urban landscape from 1831 ==
The maps in Fig.6 show the urbanization of Broomfields during the period 1831 to 1931. By 1890 domestic and commercial buildings were so dense there was little scope for new developments. The maps of 1908 and 1932 show virtually the same buildings as the map of 1893. – apart from one important change. The 1908 map has been marked up to show the Midland Railways scheme for a through line with an indication that demolition of working-class houses in Broomfields was already in process.

Fig.6 Maps of Broomfields

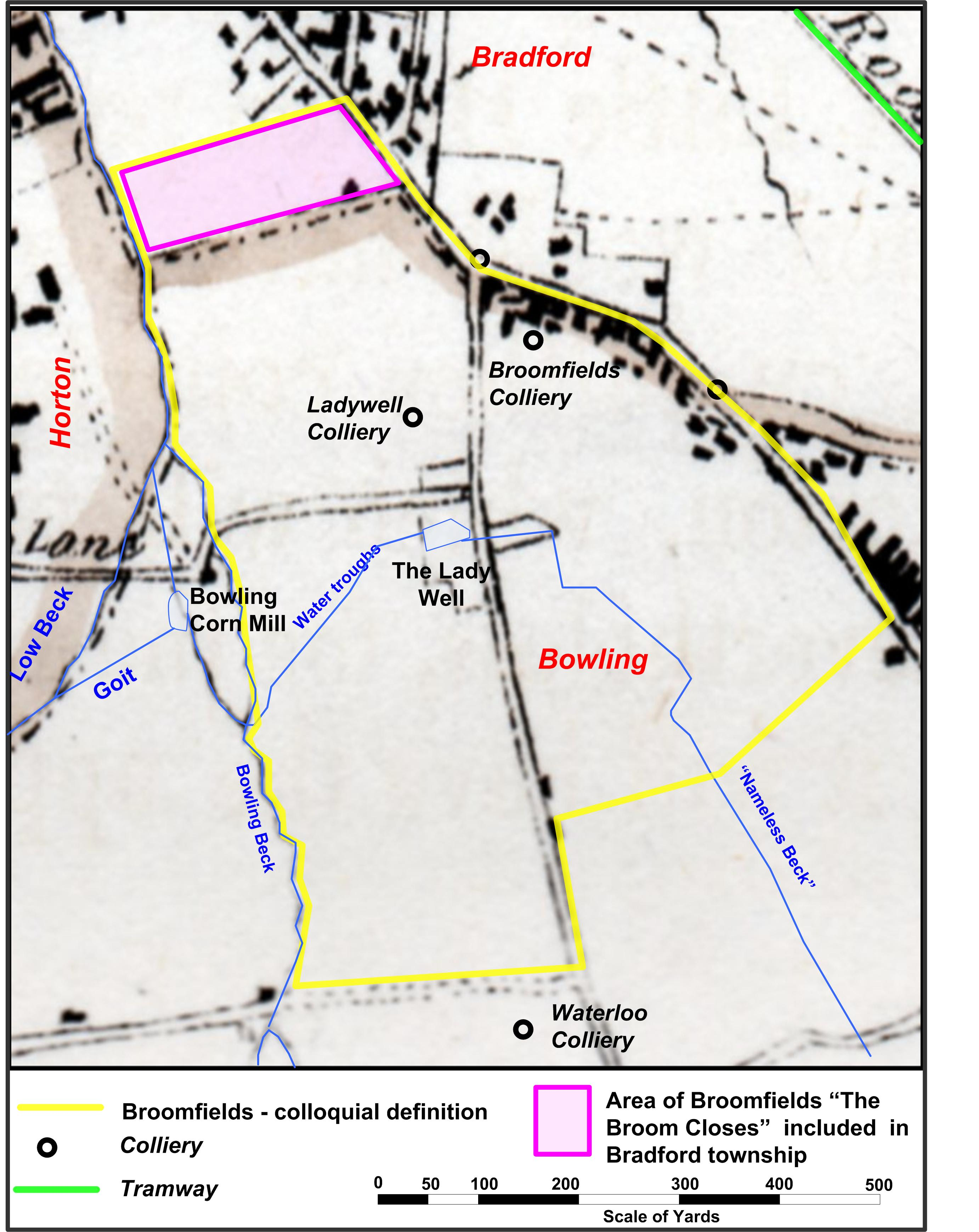
6.1 Broomfields in 1831.

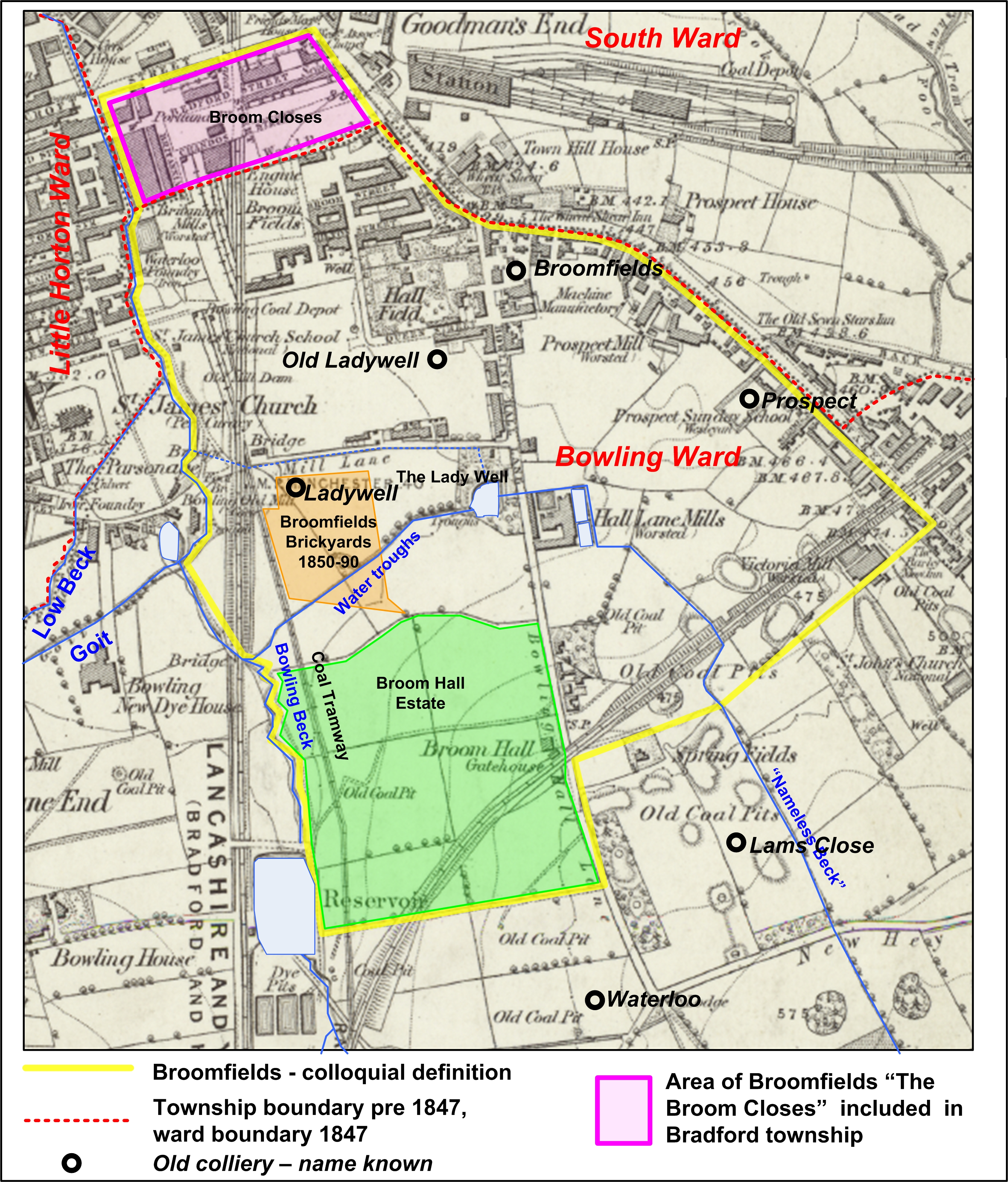
6.1 Broomfields in 1854.

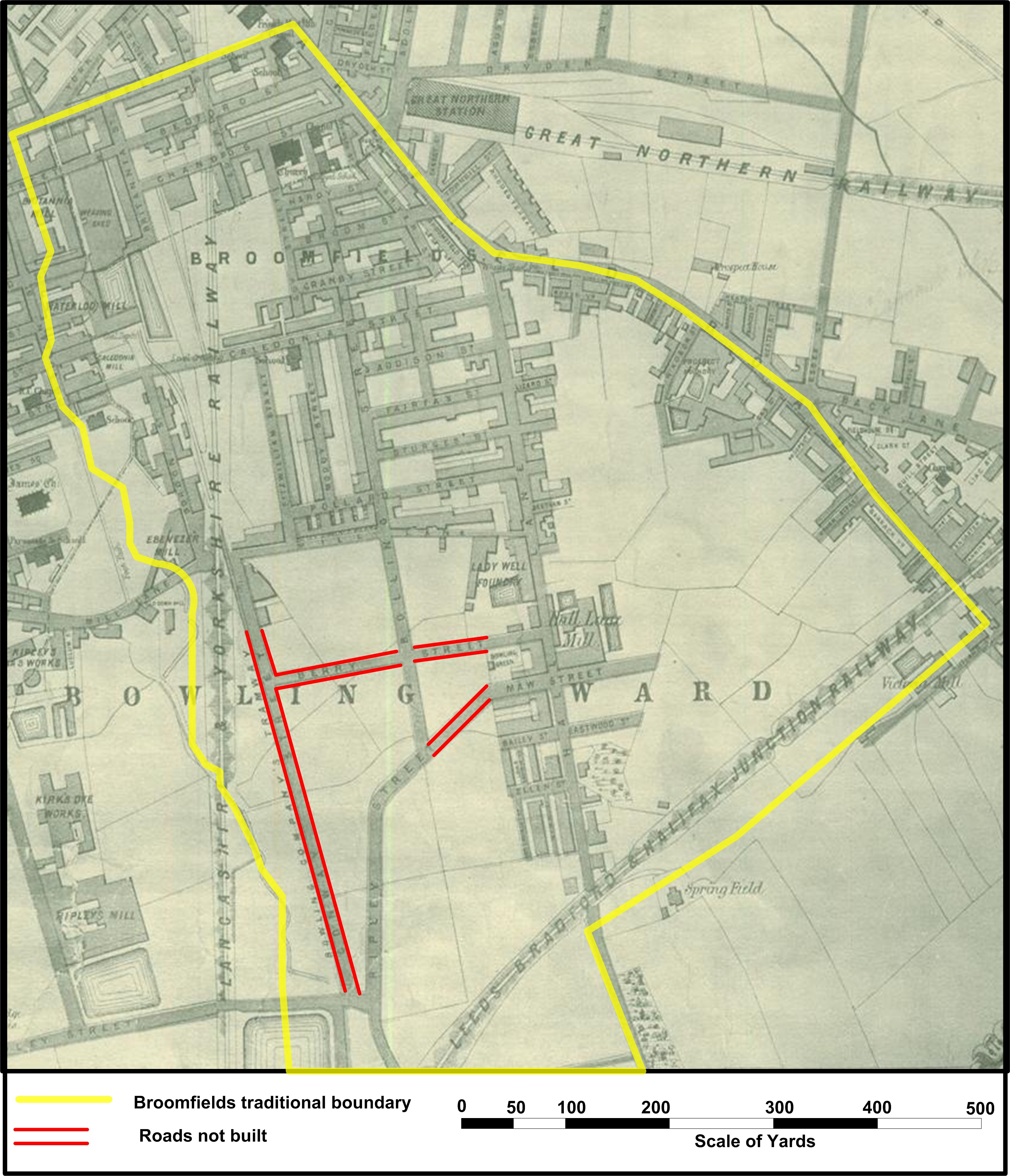
6.3 Broomfields in 1861.

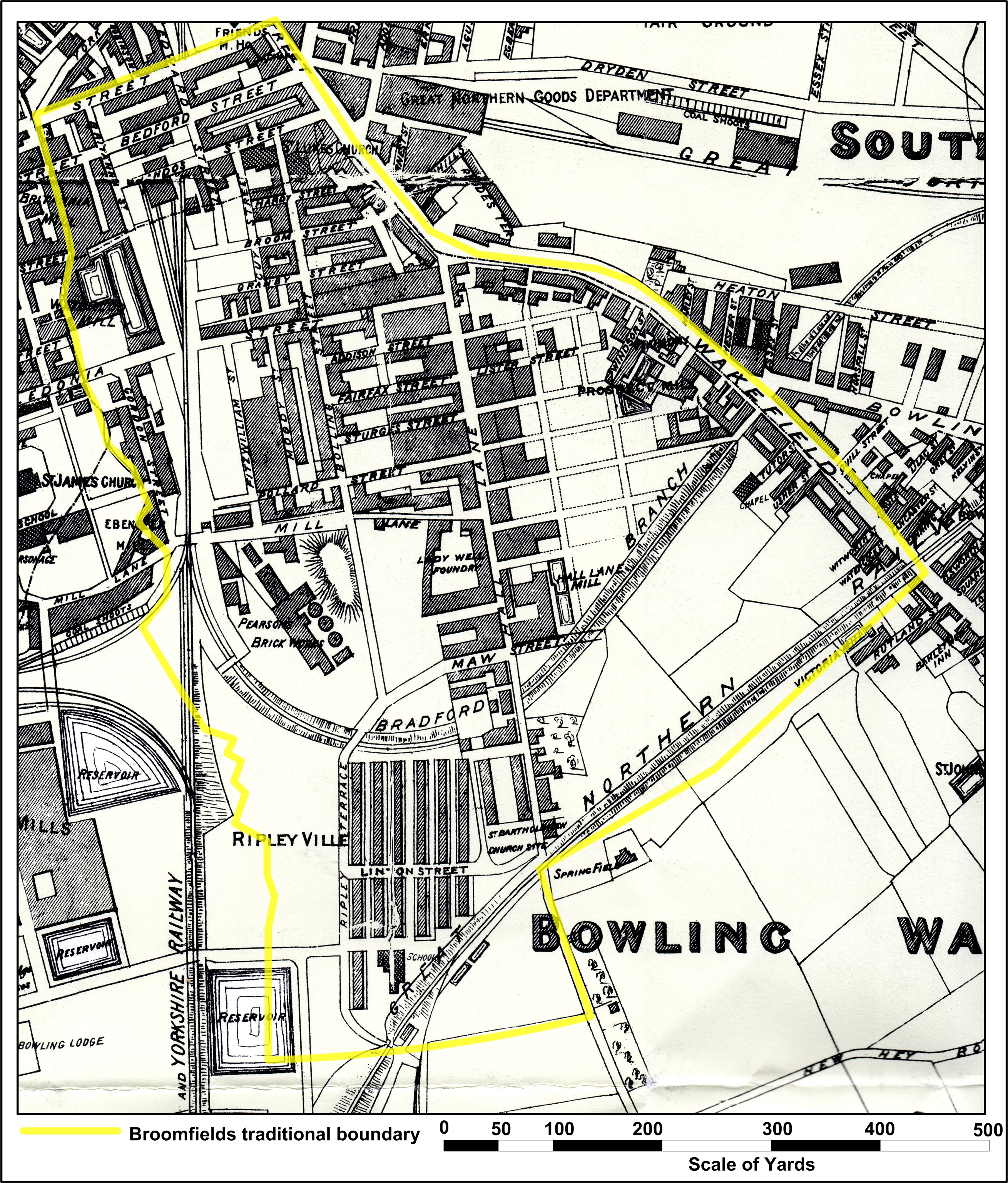
6.3 Broomfields in 1871.

.

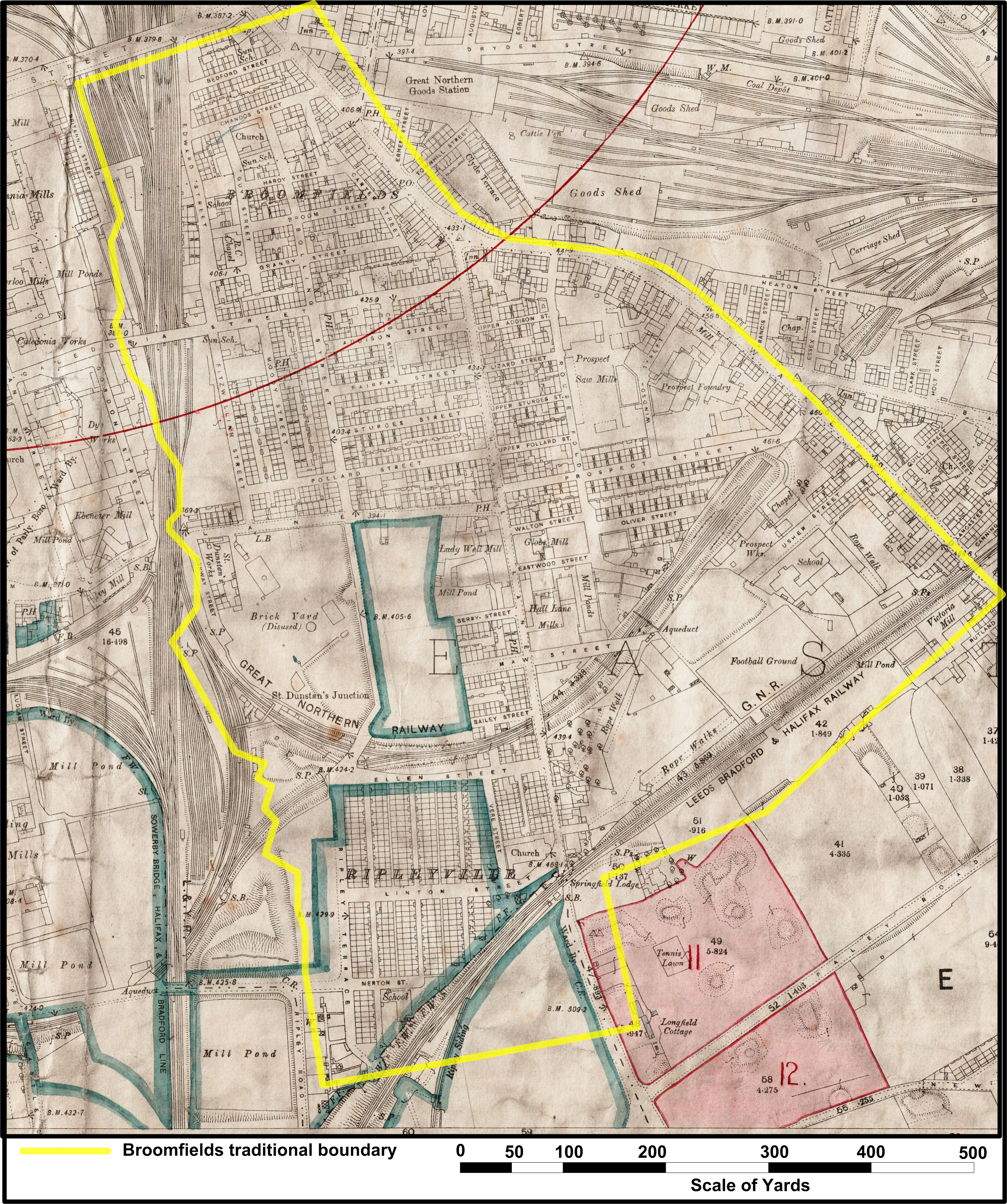
6.4 Broomfields in 1893.

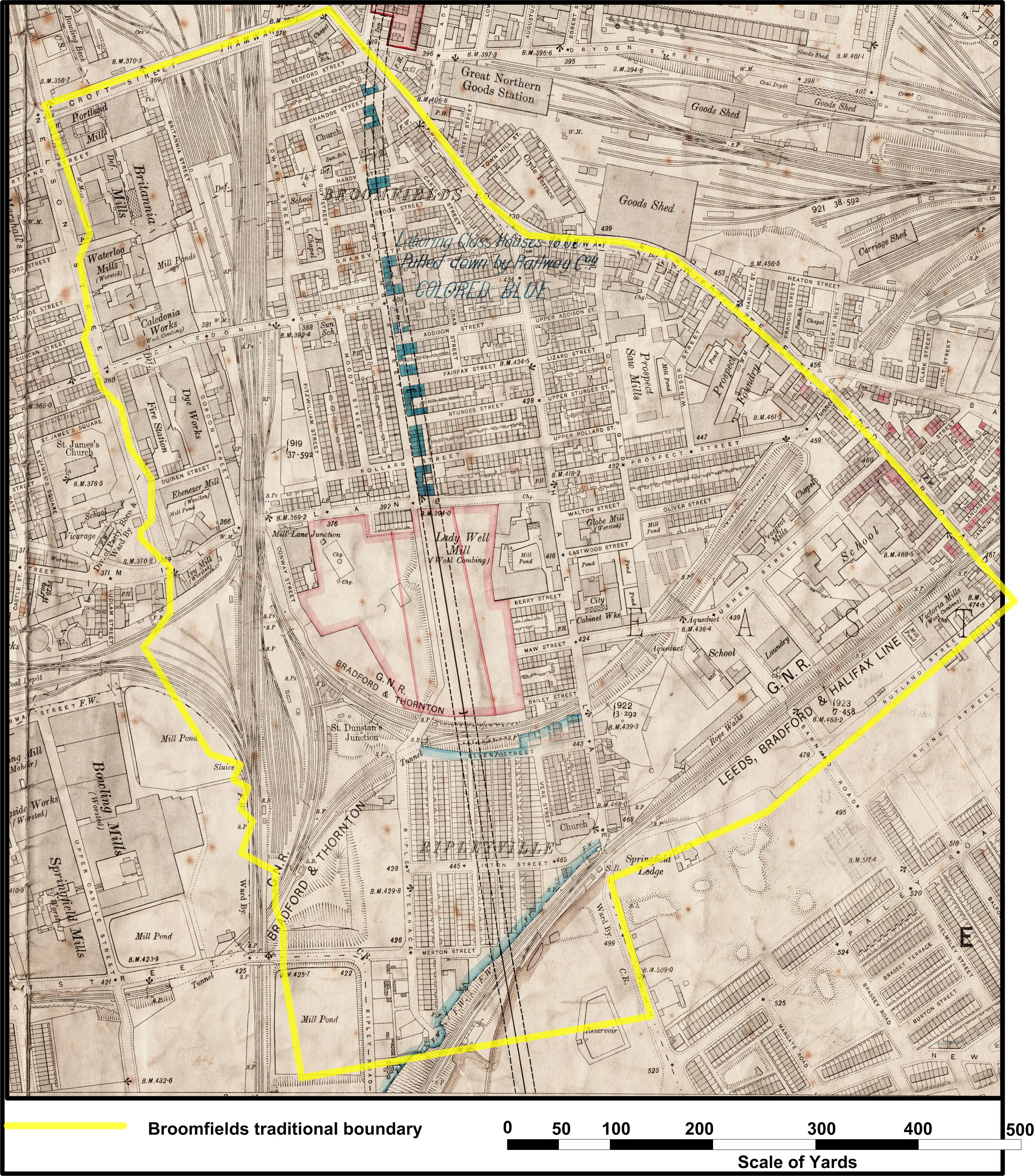
6.5 Broomfields in 1908.

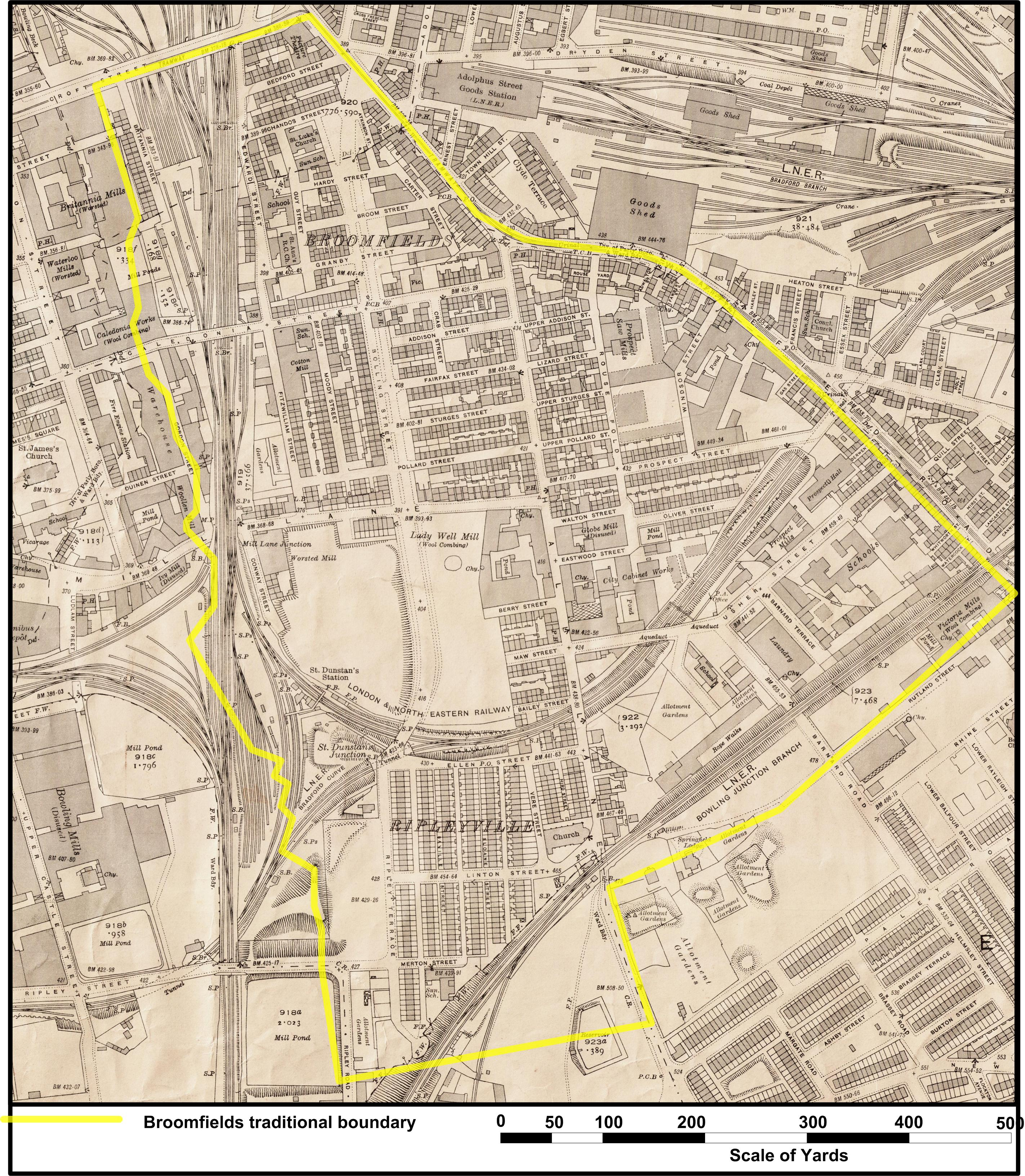
6.6 Broomfields in 1932.

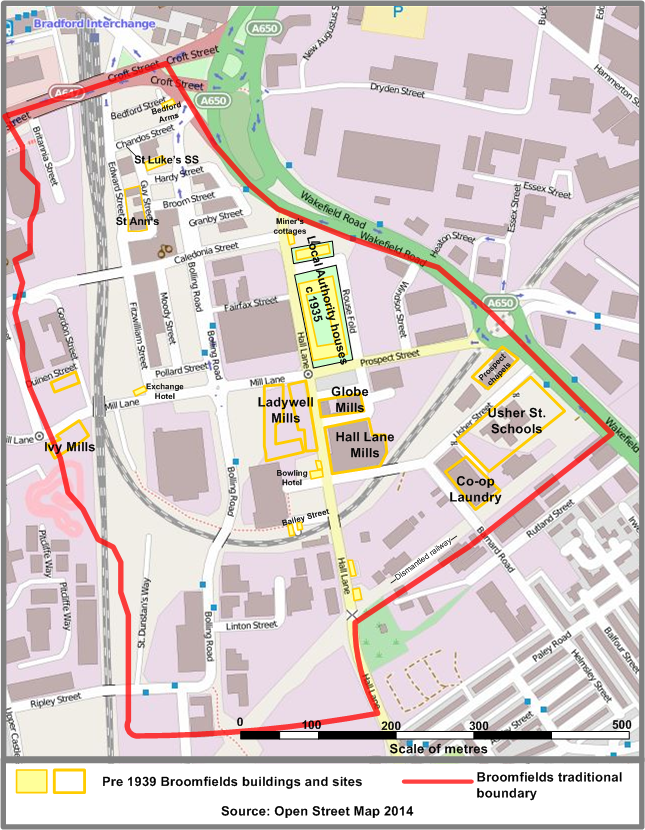
6.6 Broomfields in 2014.

.

== Population and social class in Broomfields ==
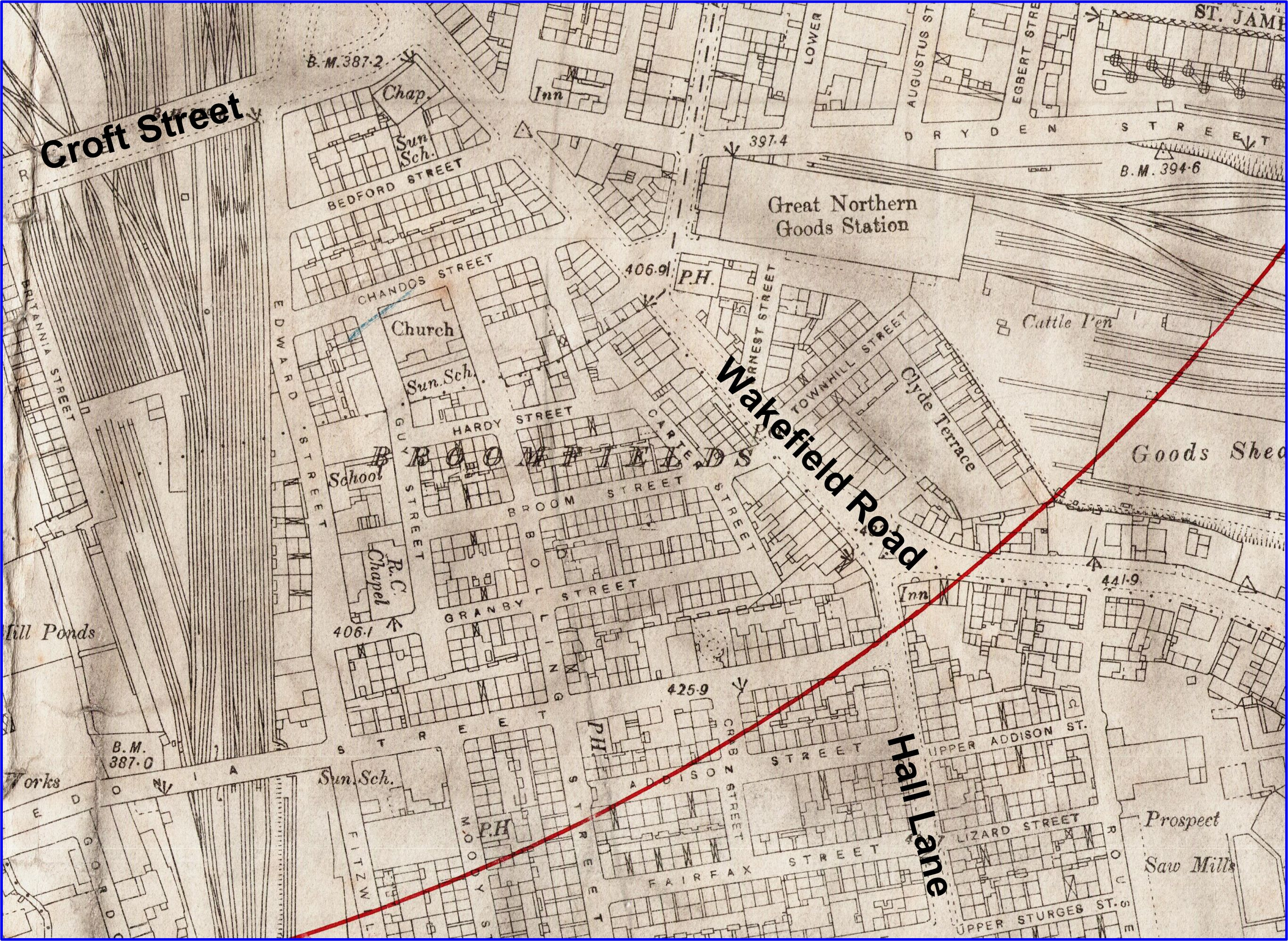
Fig. 7 Broomfields 1893. Detail from 1:2500 OS map showing dense working class housing

In the 1801 census the population of the 4 townships which would become the borough of Bradford in 1847 was 13,264. In 1851 it was 103,774. In 1881 (when the townships of Bolton, Allerton and Tyersal had joined the borough) it was 183,032. Population expansion in Broomfields mainly took place in the 1851–81 period. As Broomfields was not an administrative area there are no separate census statistics for it. In 1841 the average Bradford household size was 5.2 persons – and remained at this level until the 1880s. By that date Broomfields had about 1500 houses, indicating a population of about 7,800 – before allowing for houses in multiple accommodation and lodgers.

Richardson shows that of the Bradford population of 103,774 in the 1851 census 694 (0.7%) were born foreigners or colonials, 9,587 (9.2%) were born in Ireland and 93,502 (90.1%) were born in Great Britain. In the middle decades of the century the Irish were concentrated in 8 densely settled areas around the town centre. One of these was the Bedford Street area of Broomfields which in 1861 contained 1,162 persons of Irish birth – 19% of all Irish born persons in the Borough. Richardson estimates that three quarters of the congregation of the Roman Catholic church of St Mary's were of Irish birth or descent. Although Irish immigration reached a peak in 1840 it continued at a high level through the middle decades and only declined towards the end of the century. Cudworth's statement that the catholic parish of St Anns had 2,500 members is probably an understatement.

Writing of "the poverty stricken Irish" at the time of the 1851 census Richardson notes "The Irish came mostly from peasant backgrounds and were not welcome in 19th century Bradford. This as much as anything caused them to congregate in the established quarters. Their income status gave them little choice ..they occupied the lowest occupational groups"..."They made up 81% of the population of hawkers, 62% of "other labourers" and 25% of the charwomen and washer women..." and 15% of the hand wool combers -"the average pay of this group was 7/- for a 60 hour week"..."Crowding was more or less a necessity because rents were relatively high at two to four shillings a week for a workers cottage"..."Twenty two per cent of the households occupied by the 9,687 Irish in 1851 were two or more family households; in 1861 fourteen per cent were in this category".

These statements well describe the situation of the Irish population of Broomfields

The population of Broomfields was overwhelmingly working class. Middle class residents were confined to the dozen or so "fine houses" described earlier. The finest of these, Hall Field, with its 3-acre garden was demolished in the early 1850s and gave way to Sturges Street and Addison Street. All the other fine houses survived into the second half of the next century. In the 1860s Mr. Addison sold his house and it became the vicarage of St Luke's church. Springfield Lodge was at that time occupied by Mr Ripley, a worsted manufacturer. In 1895 it became the Methodist Manse. No. 237 Hall Lane was occupied by the Bradford registrar of Births Marriages and deaths. Later in the century it was occupied by Alderman Wright, owner of licensed premises. No. 235 Hall Lane was occupied by Mr. Mark Oddy, owner of the ropewalks. Woodsley House, no.205 Hall Lane was occupied by the Great Northern Railway's traffic manager. No.223 Hall Lane was the residence of George Pearson, railway contractor and owner of the Broomfields Brickworks. Mr Pearson's contracting business developed into an international concern. He built the twin tunnels under the River Hudson in New York before moving his residence and company headquarters to London

Dr. Samuel Lodge originated in Oxfordshire and in 1868 named his new house and surgery at No. 2 Hall Lane "Windrush House". He was already noted in his profession for his research into "wool sorter's disease" (Anthrax). As well as a general practitioner he was Bradford Police Surgeon in which position he developed high skills in forensic pathology. He retired from this post in 1897 to be succeeded by another Dr. Samuel Lodge (probably his nephew) but continued in general practice until his death in the opening years of the 20th century. His son was also a doctor. He specialized in audiology and ophthalmology and was senior consultant at the Bradford Eye and Ear Hospital. Windrush house was a GP's residence and surgery until it was demolished about 1970.

The middle class residents of Broomfields were distinguished and well known but few in number. They were never more than about 60 in a population of up to 8,000, only 0.8% of the total. Bradford as a whole was about 10% middle class. Broomfield's population was 99.2% working class.

The working class population covered a wide range of skills, income and status. The impoverished Irish cellar dwellers have already been mentioned. The residents of the four bedroom houses of Ripley Ville represented the upper strata of the working classes. Skilled craftsmen, self-employed tradesmen, school teachers, white collar workers and supervisors were typical of the residents. Many had good prospects of rising into the professional and middle classes. One such was Edward Wright. Born in 1834 he served an apprenticeship as a "machine maker" – probably with the Prospect Foundry. In 1861 he lived with his wife Emma (daughter of Mark Oddy the rope maker) in Mill Lane following the trade of "Master millwright and engineer". The family moved to No 83 Ripley Terrace. Business prospered. In the 1890s he moved to a newly built house in Bowling Park Drive: the 1901 census describes him as proprietor of an engineer's tools supply company.

Economic advancement was not limited to the upper echelons of the working classes. In the 1870s the stonemason brothers Thomas and Patrick Garvey moved from County Mayo to Bradford. After running a public house Patrick bought a house in Moody Street, Broomfields. By the time of the 1911 census he owned half a dozen houses. Thomas had retired from the building trades and lived in a comfortable house in West Bowling.

== Life and leisure in Broomfields ==
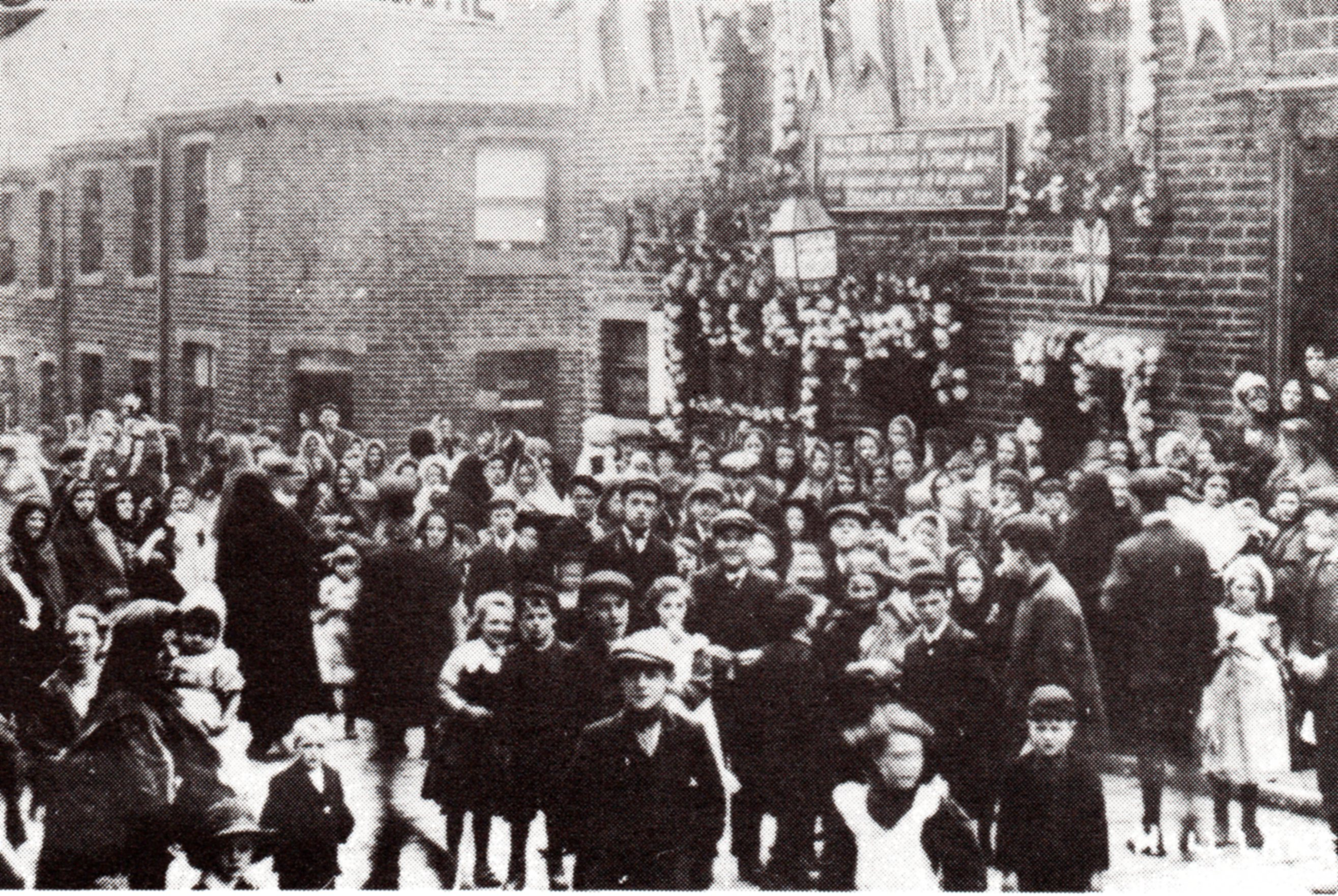
Fig. 8 Hall Lane decorated for Bowling Tide Week c. 1910

Broomfields developed a vibrant community and social life. The living rooms of the small houses were very restricted but the chapels, church halls, public houses and the streets themselves provided ample space. Twice a year Hall Lane was "en fete" for the "Spring Feast" and "Bowling Tide Week". Bowling Tide (12 August) week was Bradford's general holiday. All mills and factories stopped work. The "Tide Field" next to Hall Lane was filled by the rides and roundabouts of the travelling showmen and with stalls, coconut shies and boxing booths.

Boxing provided both entertainment and for the successful exponent of "fistics" the possibility of high earnings in the professional boxing ring and an escape from the poverty of Broomfields. Broomfields produced several champions, of whom the Delany Brothers were probably the most noted.

Church halls and chapels provided educational lectures as well as concerts, "socials" and "sit down teas". Reports in the Bradford Observer on events at Ripley Ville school hall referred to a public lecture on the Bengal Famine, "six hundred people gathered for a meeting" and on several occasions "between four and five hundred persons sat down to tea".

Public houses played a large part in social life – Broomfields had many of them. David Russell calculates that in Victorian Bradford there was 1 "pub" (public houses, dram shops and beer shops) per 200 of population. The number of licensed premises in Bradford reached a peak of 1,219 in 1882 (1 per 152 of population) and had fallen to 926 in 1894 (1 per 205 of population).

Some of the Broomfields pubs were quite grand buildings with concert rooms. The concert room of the Bowling Hotel was popular for wedding receptions. The ancient hostelry of The Wheat Sheaf was reconstructed in a classical style to conform with the new tastes. Russell notes "it must be remembered that the public house was not merely a source of drink and company, but acted as a focus for such divers activities as music, botany, geology cricket and bowls." Shopping and visiting the pub were very local activities. There was almost a shop on every street corner. Smiths Directory of 1912 lists 37 shops and pubs in Hall Lane. The list consisted of

- 6 licensed premises and 6 general shops
- 5 butchers and 5 grocers
- 3 fish and chip shops and 3 greengrocers
- 2 drapers and 2 tobacconists
- 1 hairdresser, 1 milliner and 1 pawnbroker

The dense buildings of Broomfields did not allow much space for outdoor sports. However, the 1893 1:2500 OS map shows a football field between Usher Street and the Railway embankment and next to the new Board Schools. The 1908 map shows that the co-op had built its laundry and depot on the site. The Broomfields Brickworks closed in 1890 and when the site was leveled it was commandeered by local schools and clubs and used as a football field until 1960.

In 1880 Bowling Park (Bowling Park, Bradford) opened with its north gate in Hall Lane only two hundred yards from Broomfields. In his invaluable article Russell describes the movement for "rational recreation". Its aim was to replace traditional working class leisure activities, spontaneous, unorganized, boisterous and sometimes disorderly, with activities less threatening to the middle classes and more in keeping with their values. Russell notes the opening of the Mechanics Institute in 1837 as an early victory for rational recreation. The municipal parks were a major victory.

Fig.8 Broomfields children in Bowling Park c1950

Bowling Park was beautifully landscaped with flower gardens, conservatories, promenades, a drinking fountain and band concerts. Enjoyment of the facilities was regulated by detailed bylaws, with fines and penalties for infringement. The bylaws laid down opening and closing times, prohibited football, meetings, dogs, alcohol and any form of unseemly behaviour. Despite the restrictions the park became very popular and well used. Sunday afternoon band concerts were very well attended – to the dismay of sabbatarians.

Fig. 9 shows Broomfield children in their Sunday best enjoying the rose garden – but probably infringing the bylaws by standing on the grass. The comparison with Fig. 8 is instructive.

Broomfields had one of the first cinemas in Bradford. The disused Wesleyan chapel on the corner of Croft Street and Wakefield Road re-opened as "The Picturedrome" in 1910. It was renamed "The Astra" in 1949. On Saturday afternoon it held the "penny rush" with a program of films, singing and competitions for the children of Broomfields. It remained in use as a cinema until 1956. The building was demolished for road widening in the 1959.

== De-population and industrial transformation after 1930 ==
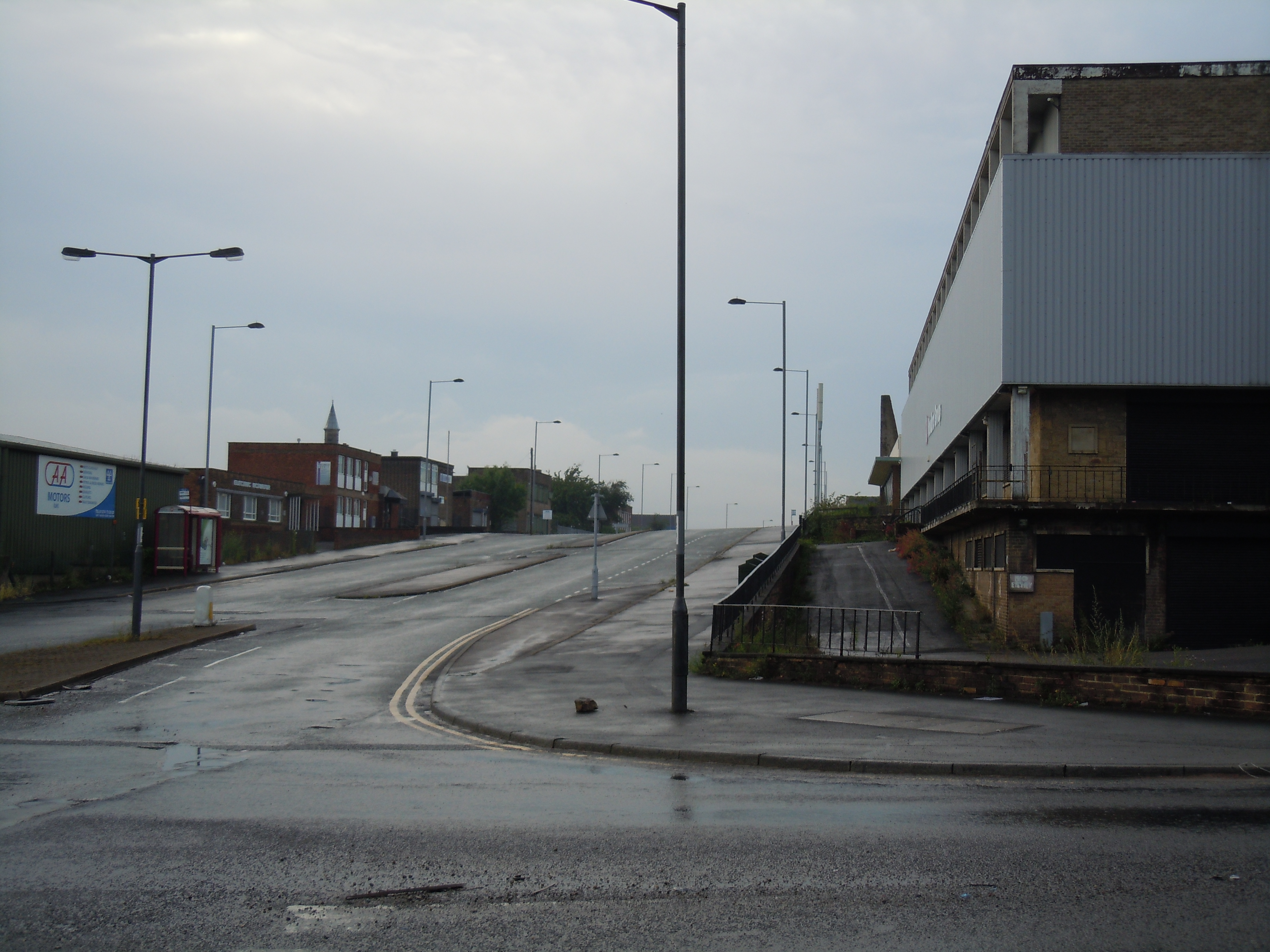
Fig.11 Bolling Road built 1931

Bradford Borough Council initiated its first slum clearance and urban regeneration schemes (although on a small scale) in the first decade of the 20th century. After the first world war it was presented with an unexpected opportunity in Broomfields. The Midland Railway Company had acquired Ladywell fields and a strip of houses along Bolling Street for its planned Bradford Through Line. It had already started on demolition (see Fig. 6.5) when it decided (1918) to abandon the scheme. Land acquired by the company was bought by the Bradford Corporation. In 1926 the corporation declared Ladywell Fields a public park and built a children's paddling pool fed from the Ladywell spring. The corporation continued the demolition program initiated by MRC and built not a railway but an up-to-date dual carriageway road. Completed in 1931 and named "Bolling Road" it was intended as a focus for urban regeneration. It is shown in Fig.11.

On completion of the road a major "slum clearance" program followed. Many of the houses demolished predated the 1854 building bylaw and had wholly inadequate space and sanitary provision. By 1939 virtually all the houses between the railway and Rouse Fold and north of Mill Lane had been demolished. Only pubs, some commercial premises and a few of the grander houses were spared demolition.

52 new local authority houses were built between Rouse Fold and Hall Lane. The majority of the Broomfields residents were re-housed on the borough's new "out of town" estate at Canterbury Avenue.

In 1939 war interrupted the program. In 1945, in the face of a desperate housing shortage, the Corporation was glad to accept a central government offer of 350 prefabricated houses. (See Prefabs in the UK) About 60 of these were erected on the recently cleared land in Broomfields. (See fig 14.4).

In 1951 (as required by the 1947 Town and Country Planning Act) Bradford Corporation formally adopted the "Bradford Development Plan". This plan envisaged the demolition of virtually all 19th century housing in Broomfields and its replacement by "light industrial and distribution" uses. The regeneration program started with construction of a new police headquarters in Bolling Road about 1956. After removal of the "prefabs" new industrial units appeared rapidly. In the late 1950s house demolition recommenced. By 1960 virtually all 19th century houses in and adjoining Hall Lane had been demolished. In 1970 the "model village" of Ripley Ville was demolished. Over the next few years Wakefield Road was widened to a dual carriage way and the remnants of Broomfield's 19th century houses were cleared to make way for it.

== Broomfields in the 21st century ==
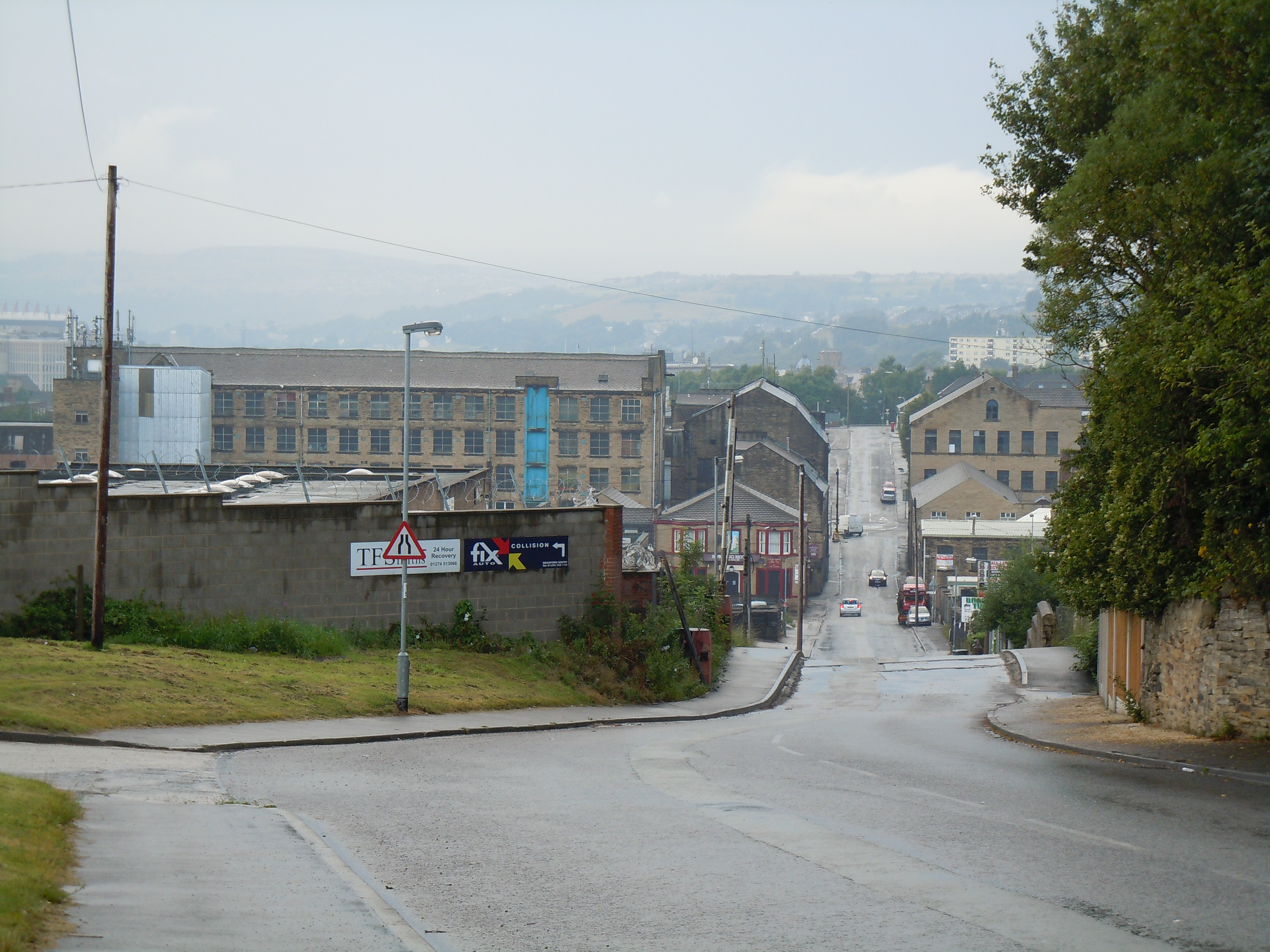
Fig.12 Broomfields from Hall Lane, July 2014

.

The view of Broomfields shown in Fig. 12 suggests a very Victorian townscape. However, the three mills are actually amongst the few survivors from that period. A satellite view of the area today is dominated by the anonymous grey sheds of modern warehousing and distribution and a number of smaller office buildings.

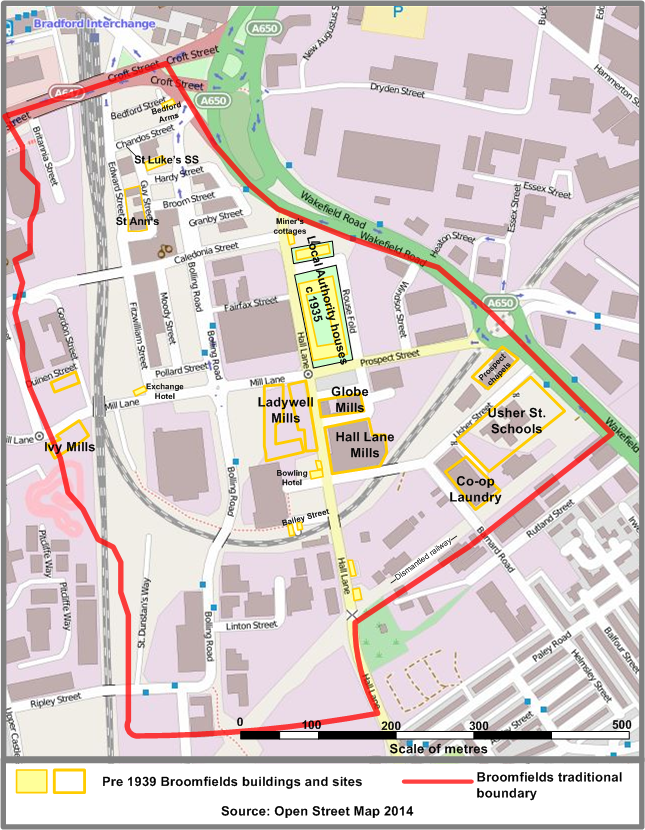
Fig.12 A Map of Broomfields 2014

.

The area has been transformed almost beyond recognition from the landscape of half a century back. The "Bradford Development Plan" of 1951 was implemented with extreme thoroughness. The photo galleries record the few remnants of Victorian Broomfields. Only 4 mills remain intact – and only Ladywell Mills remains in use for textile production.

Of the 1,500 houses built by the end of the 19th century only 14 still exist. Only 6 are still occupied, the others being in commercial use. The only other occupied houses are the 52 local authority houses built between Rouse Fold and Hall Lane in the 1930s. Since its peak between 1890 and the First World War the resident population has declined from about 8,000 to a couple of hundred.

Of the numerous public houses which once characterised the area the buildings of only three still remain. Of these only the former Exchange Inn, now renamed the "Mill Lane Pub", is still in use as licensed premises.

Of the many churches and chapels which once stood in Broomfields evidence of only 3 remain. The old (1871) and new (1906) chapels of Prospect Methodists still exist. The old chapel has been en engineering warehouse since 1960. The new chapel has been a Muslim mosque since the mid 1970s. Of the Anglican church of St Luke's only the Sunday school building still remains; it has been in use as an engineering workshop since 1942. The imposing buildings of St Ann's RC church with its presbytery and school are well cared for and in use as a company HQ

The site of the Lady Well and its sylvan pool, the historic centre of Broomfields, can still be identified. It is shown in Fig 13.2. It has been concreted over for use as a car park. Amongst the unkempt vegetation which fringes it might be some bushes of flowering broom.

Fig.13 Mills

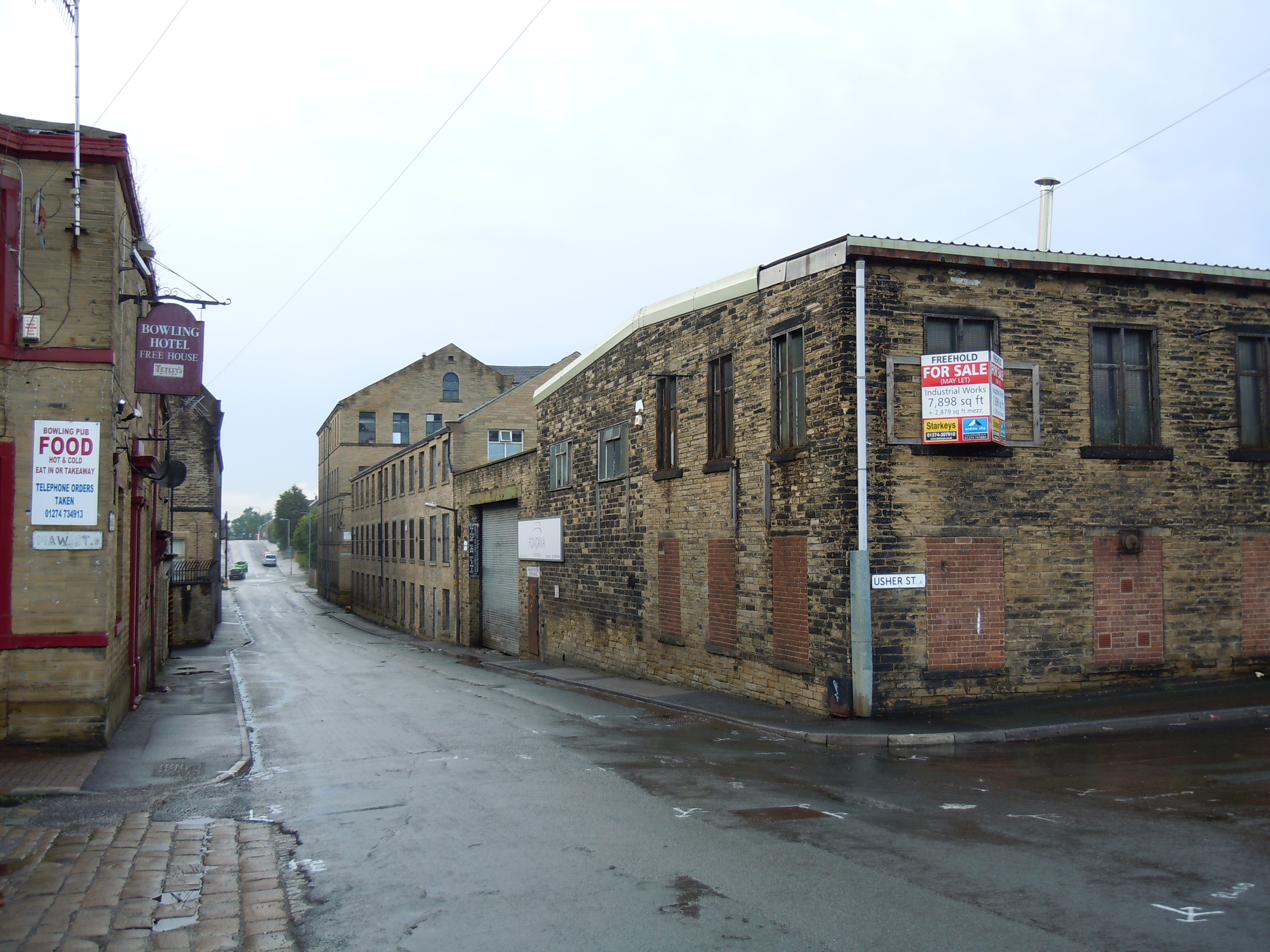
13.1. (left) Ladywell (right) Hall Lane & Globe mills

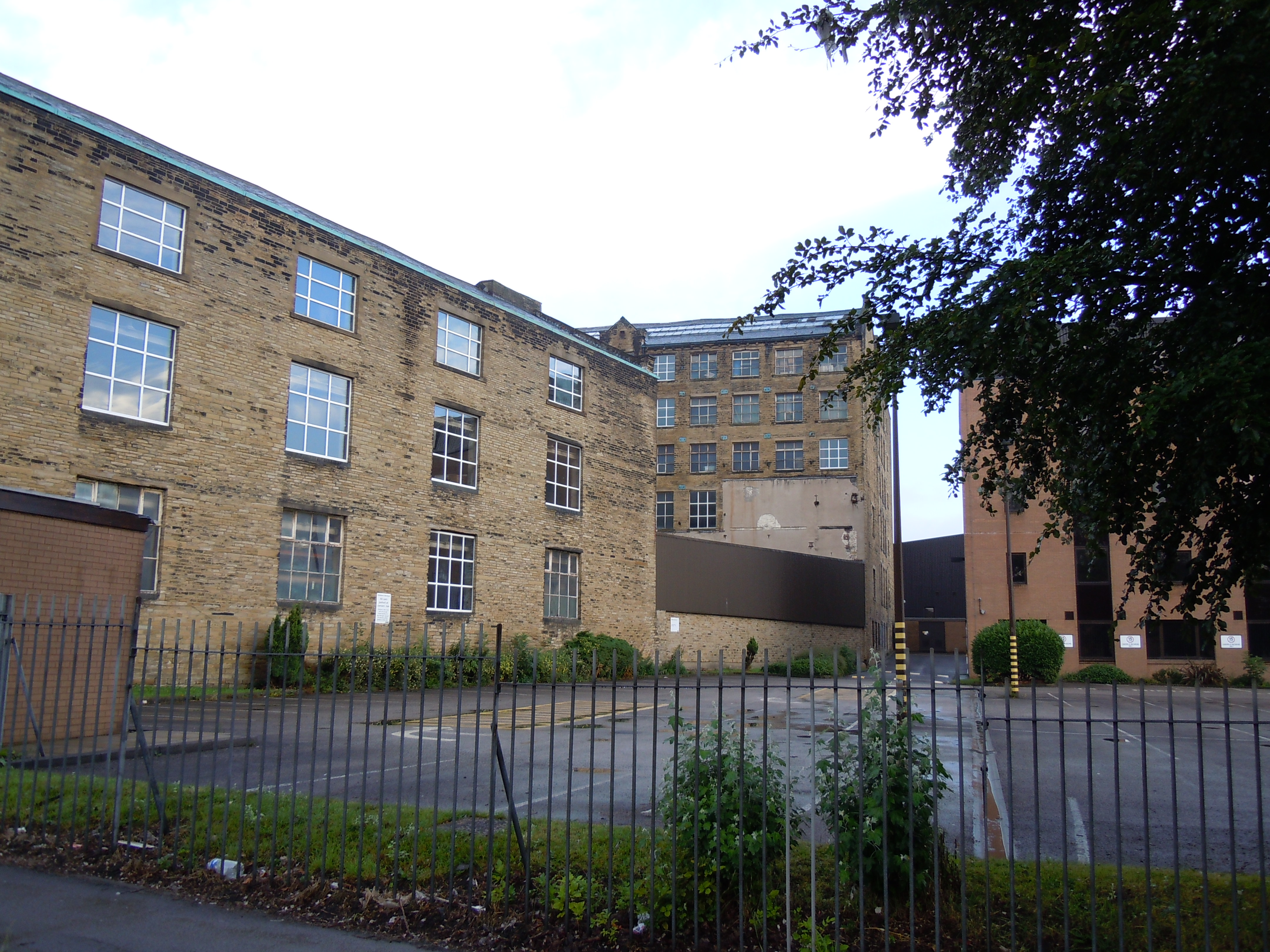
13.2 Site of the Lady Well and Ladywell mills

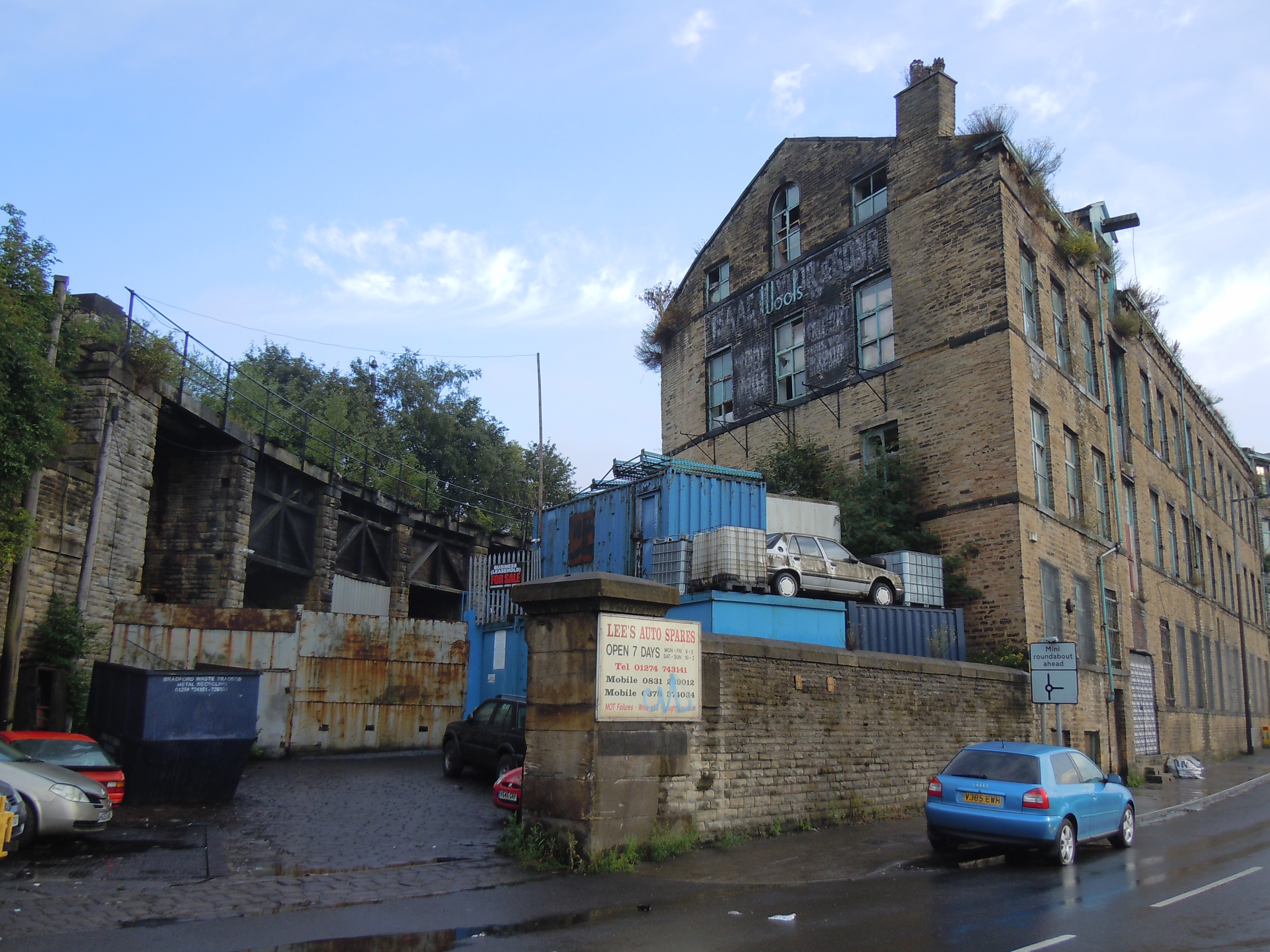
13.3 Ivy Mills and coal drops on the site of Bowling corn mills.

Fig.14 Houses

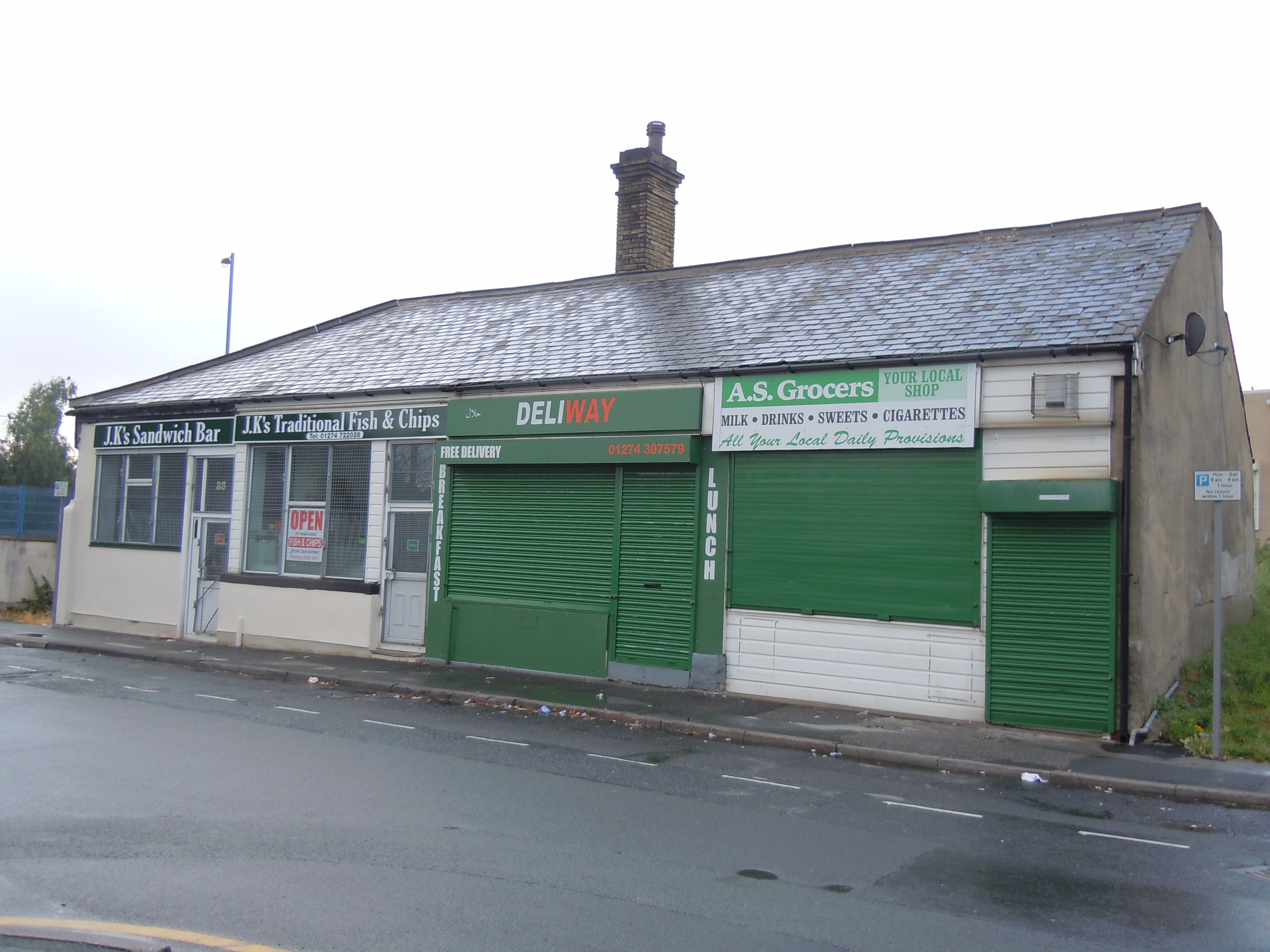
14.1 Coal miner's cottages in Hall Lane built c 1800.

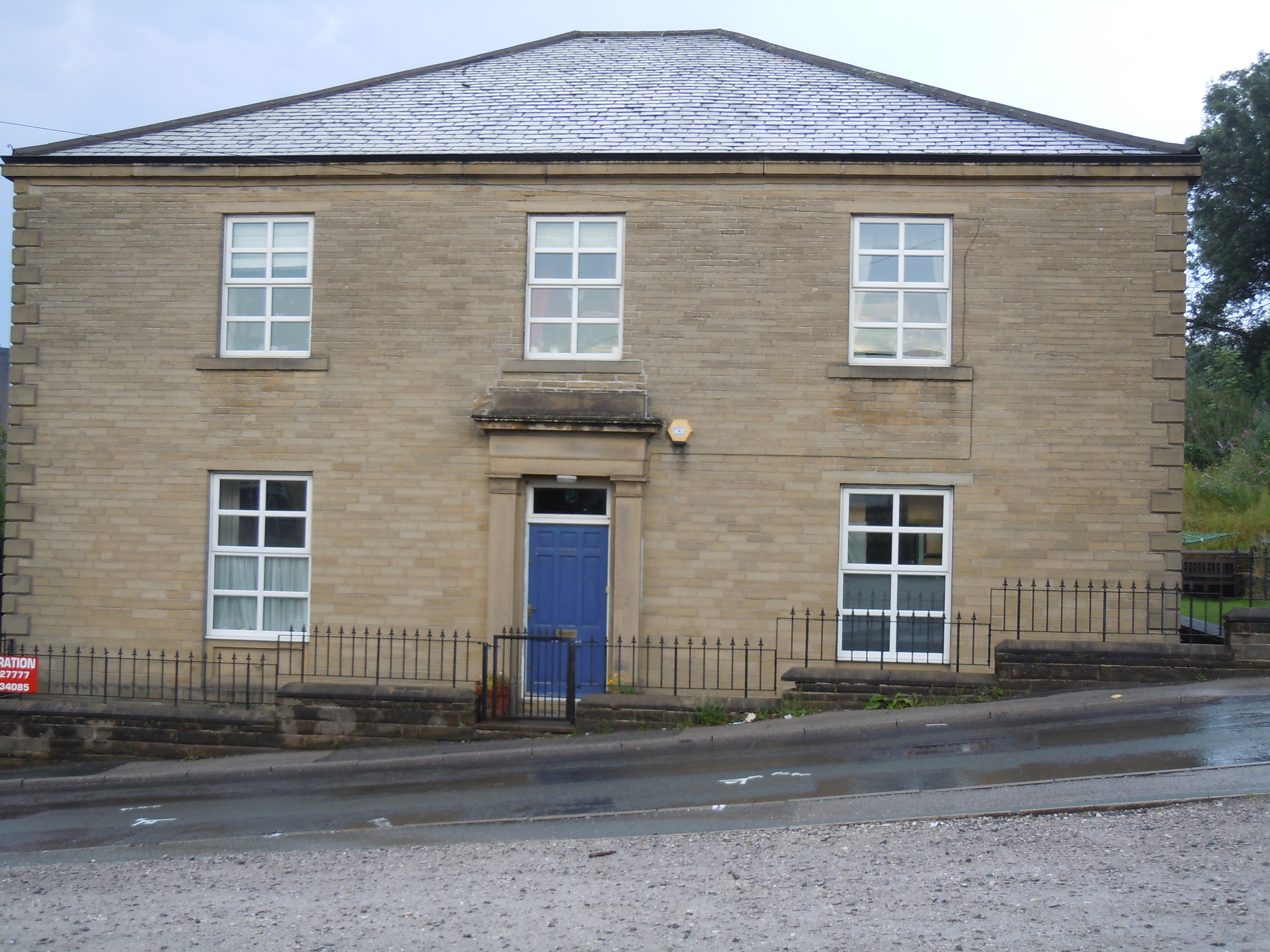
14.2 Middle class villa No. 237 Hall Lane built c 1851

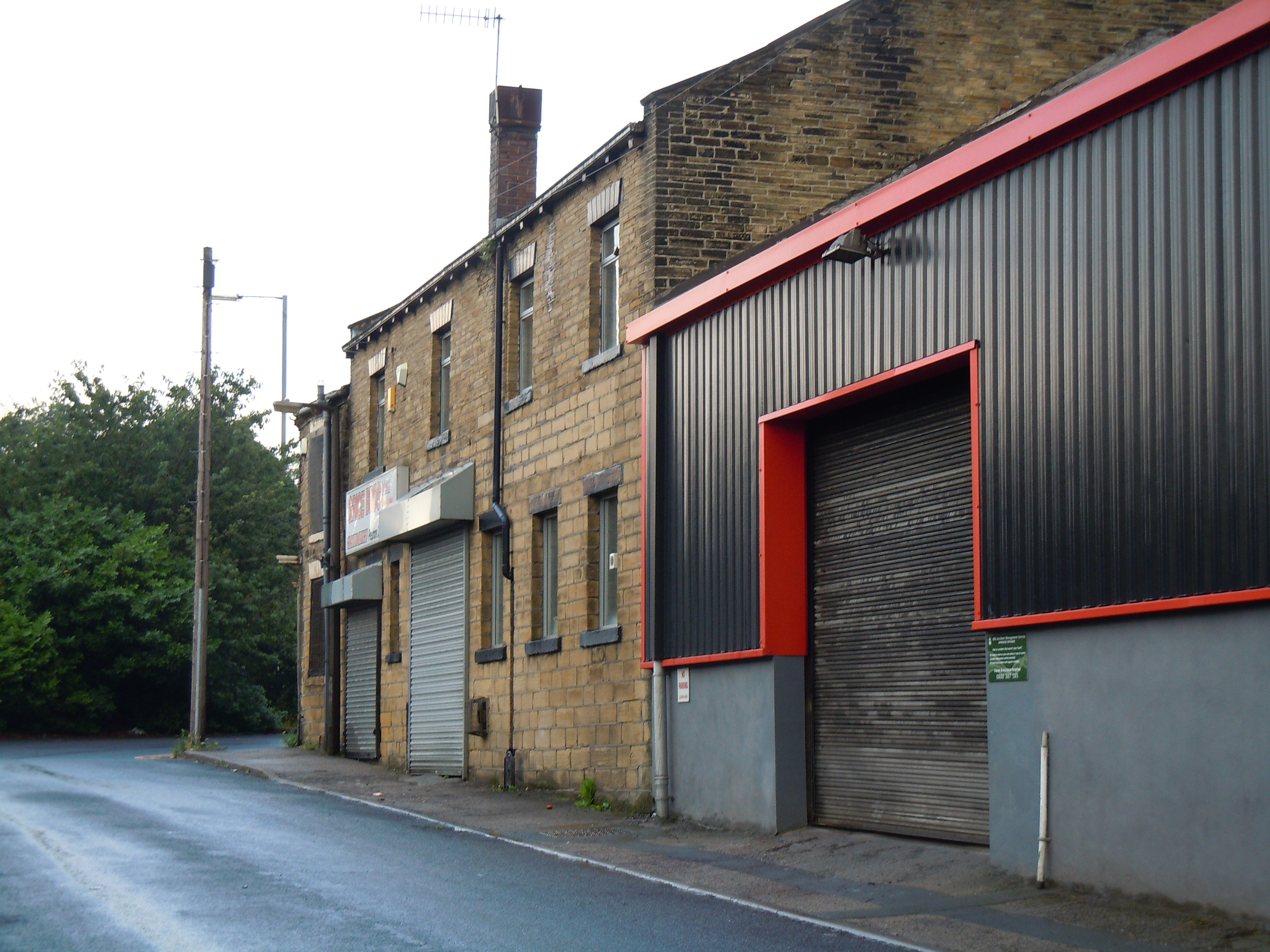
14.3 Working-class houses in Broom Street built c 1853

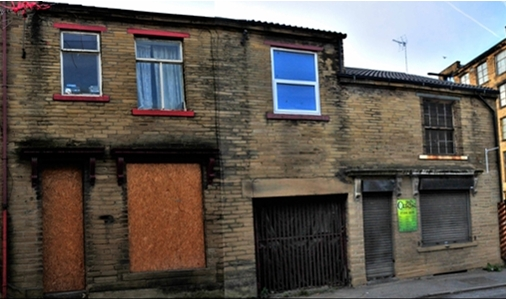
14.4 Working-class houses with shops. Nos. 110 & 108 Hall Lane built c 1858.

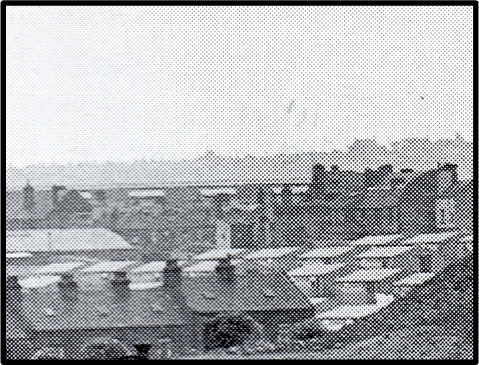
14.6 Prefabs in Broomfields c 1951

Fig.15 Public Houses

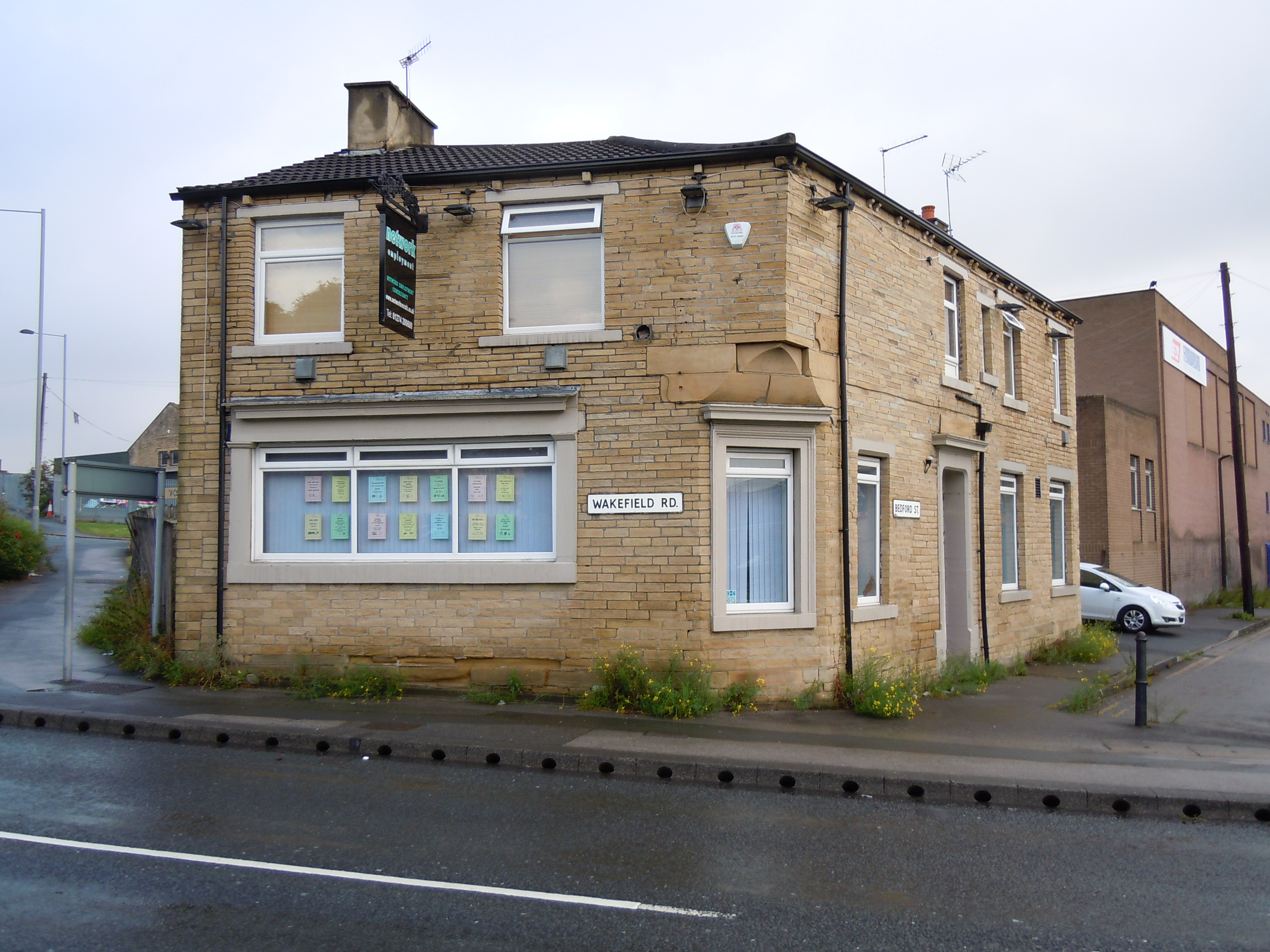
15.1 Bedford Arms

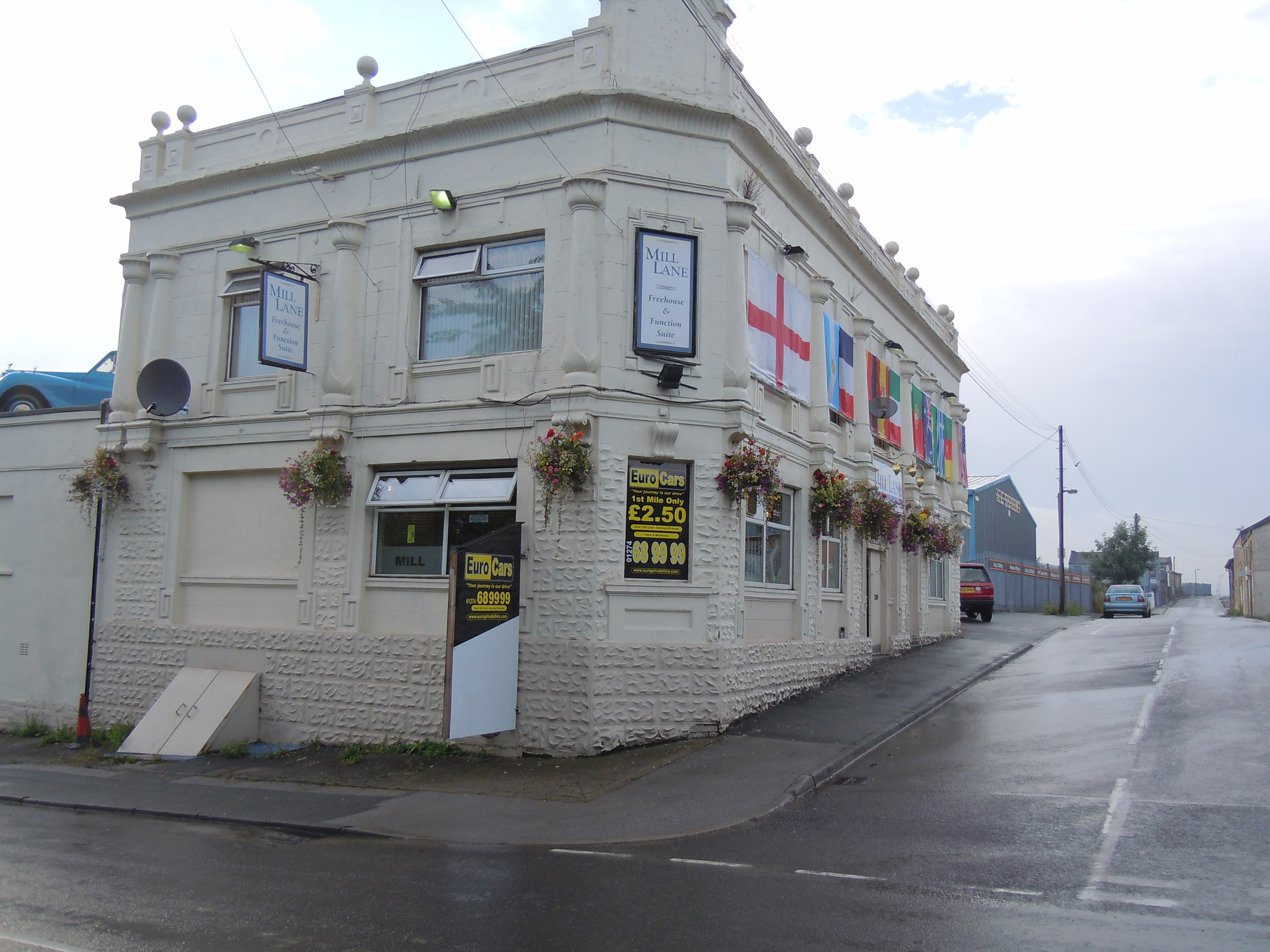
15.2 Exchange Inn

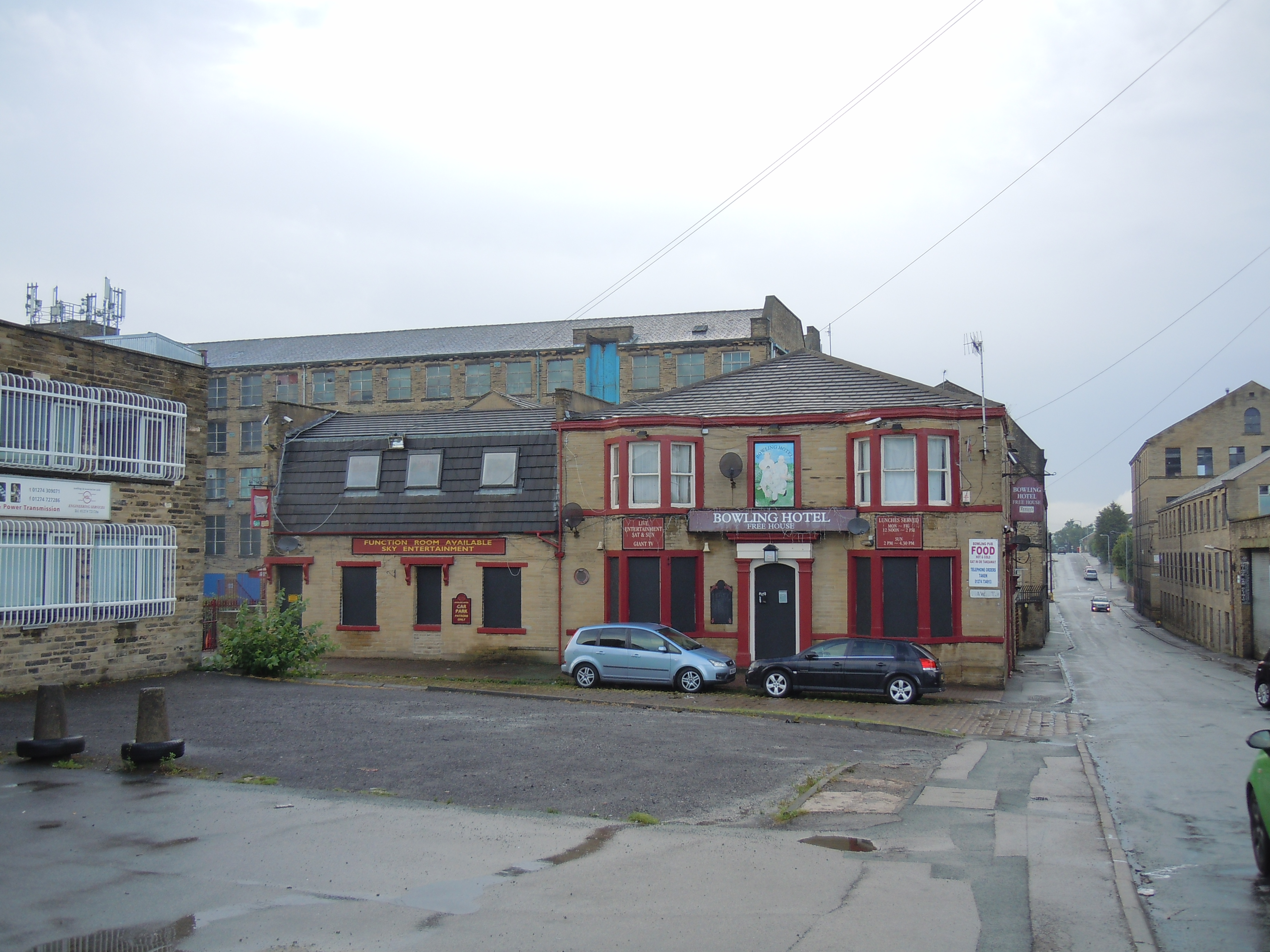
15.3 Bowling Hotel

Fig.16 Places of Worship

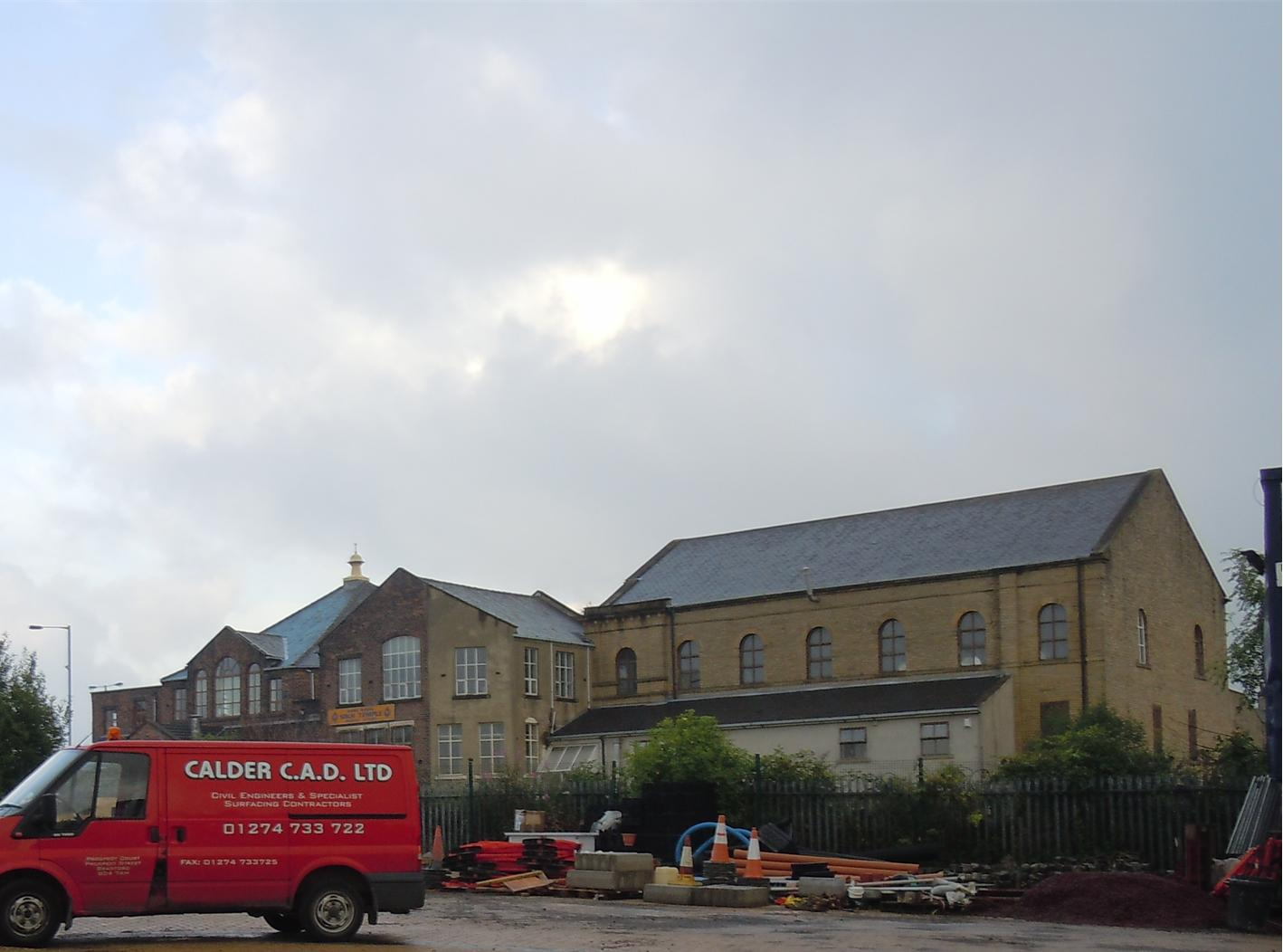
16.1 Prospect Methodist Chapels.

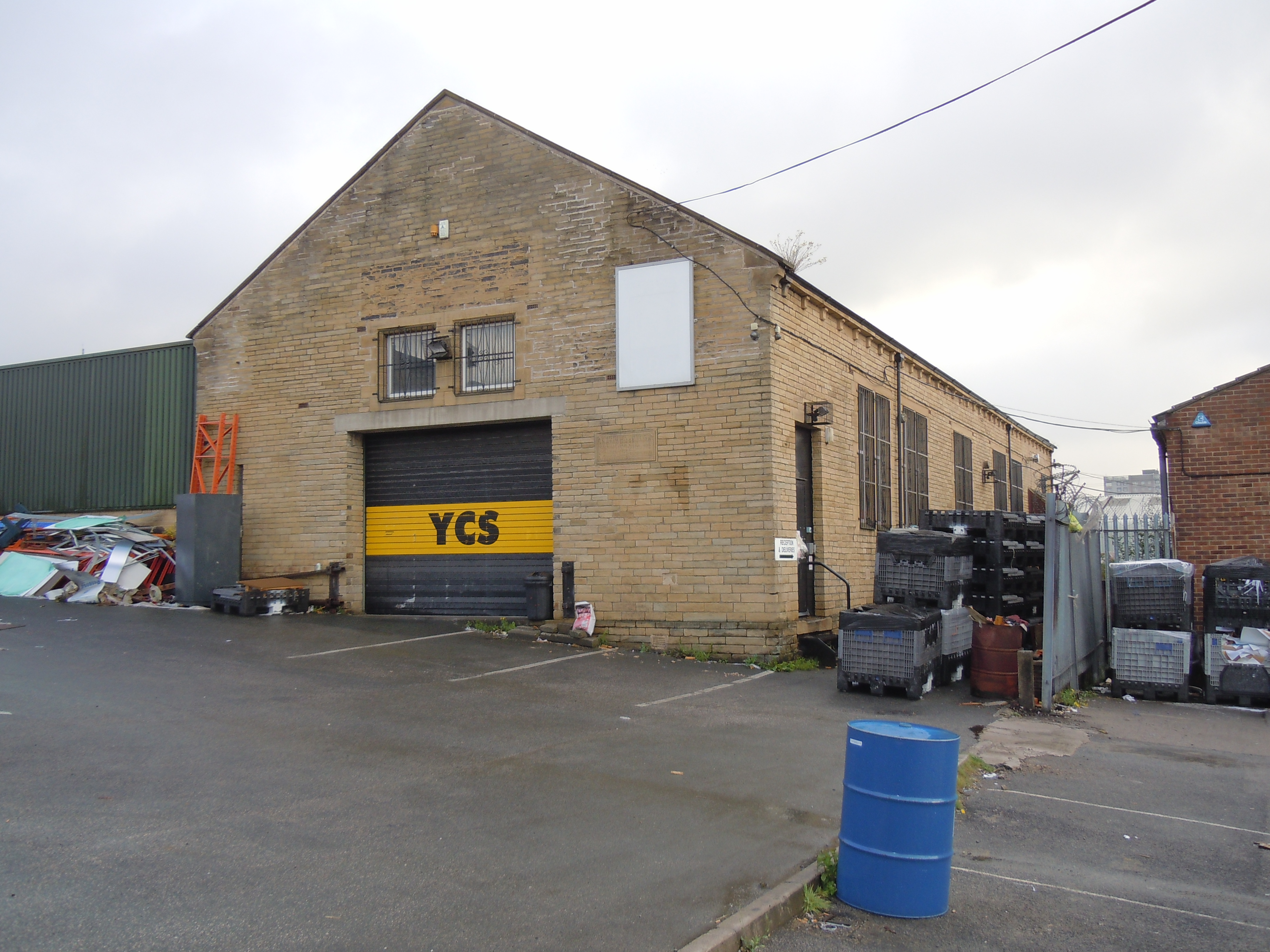
16.2 St Luke's (CoE) Sunday School.

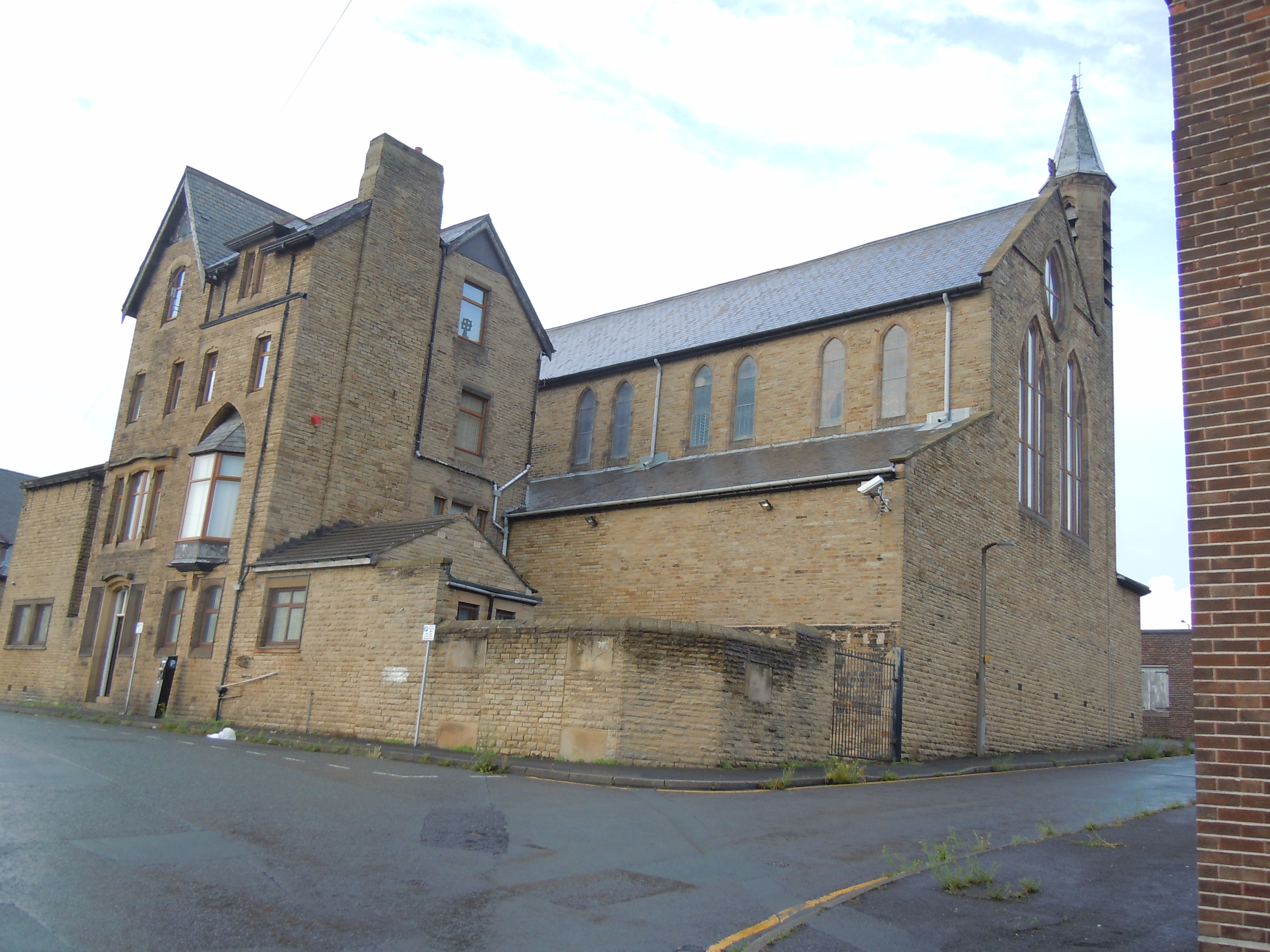
16.3 St Ann's (RC) church, presbytery and school.

== Bibliography ==
- Bradford Corporation (1856) The Acts relating to the Transfer of the Bradford Waterworks to the Corporation of Bradford.
- Bradford Directory (1872) Smiths Directory of Bradford 1872. Republished by Bank House Directories 2009 ISBN 9781904408482
- Bradford Directory (1912) Kelly's Directory of Bradford 1912. Republished 2011 TWC Publishing
- Bradford Libraries and East Bowling History Workshop. 1978 "Bowling Tidings"
- Caffyn, Lucy (1986) Worker's Houses in West Yorkshire 1750–1920. HMSO ISBN 0 11 300002 2
- Cudworth, William (1882) Historical Notes on the Bradford Corporation. Republished Old Bradfordian Press
- Cudworth, William (1888) Worstedopolis. Republished Old General Books Memphis
- Cudworth, William (1891) Histories of Bolton and Bowling. Thomas Brear & Co Bradford
- Cudworth, William (1891) Condition of the Industrial Classes. Collected articles from the Bradford Observer. Republished by Mountain Press 1977
- Firth, Gary (1990) Bradford and the Industrial Revolution. Ryburn Publishing ISBN 1-85331-010-7
- Firth, Gary (2006) J. B. Priestley's Bradford. Tempus Publishing ISBN 978 0 7524 3865 8
- Firth, Gary (2001) Salt and Saltaire. Tempus Publishing ISBN 0 7524 1630 8
- Hole, J. (1868)The Homes of the Working Classes with suggestions for their improvement. Longmans Green & Co. London
- James, David (1990) Bradford. Ryburn Publishing ISBN 978-1-85331-005-8
- James, John (1841) The History and Topography of Bradford, Longmans. Republished Mountain Press 1967 Centenary edition.
- James, John (1866) Continuations and Additions to The History of Bradford, Longmans. Republished E.J Morten 1973. ISBN 0 901598 69 0
- Jennings, Paul (1995) The Public House in Bradford 1770–1970, Keele University Press. ISBN 9781853311130
- Jennings, Paul (2004) Bradford Pubs. The History Press. ISBN 9780752433028
- Jowitt J. A. (editor) (1986) Model Industrial Communities in Mid Nineteenth Century Yorkshire. University of Bradford. ISBN 1 85143 016 4
- Jowitt J. A.& Wright D.G. (editors) (1986) Victorian Bradford. University of Bradford. ISBN 0-907734-01-4
- Keighley, Mark (2007) Wool City. Whitaker and Company ISBN 978-0-9555993-1-6
- Pickles, Derek (1966) The Bowling Tramways. Unpublished dissertation available at http://www.keepandshare.com/doc/3499098/bowling-tramways-doc-january-30-2012
- Rhodes, J. F. (1890) Bradford Past and Present. J.F.Rhodes and Sons, Bradford
- Richardson C. (1976) A Geography of Bradford. University of Bradford ISBN 0 901945 19 6
- Scruton, William (1889) Pen and Pencil Sketches of Old Bradford. Republished Mountain Press 1968
- Sheeran, George (1986) Good Houses Built of Stone . Allenwood Books ISBN 0 947963 03 0
- Sheeran, George (1990) The Victorian Houses of Bradford. Bradford Libraries ISBN 0-907734-21-9 (First published in 1986 in volume 2, pp. 47–53, of the third series of The Bradford Antiquary, the journal of the Bradford Historical and Antiquarian Society)
- Sheeran, George (1993) Brass Castles. Ryburn Publishing Ltd ISBN 1-85331-022-0
- Shepherd, Val (1994) Historic Wells in and Around Bradford. Heart of Albion Press. ISBN 1 872883 31 1
- Thornhill, John (1986) "All Change – Bradford's through railway scheme"' Bradford Antiquary 3rd series vol. 02 1986. Available at https://web.archive.org/web/20140714152803/http://www.bradfordhistorical.org.uk/antiquary/third/vol02/allchange.html
- Walker, R. L. (2008) When was Ripleyville Built? SEQUALS, ISBN 0 9532139 2 7
