= Holy Rood Church, Barnsley =

Holy Rood Church
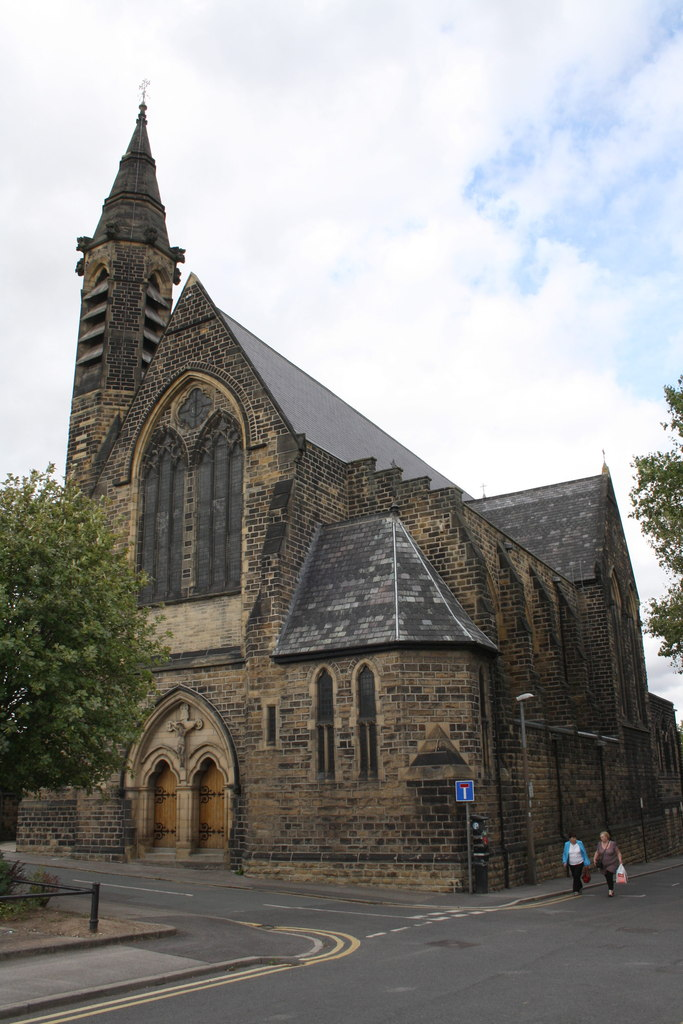
- Holy Rood Church
- 53.5507°N 1.4841°W
- OS grid reference: SE3427406120
- Location: Barnsley
- Country: England
- Denomination: Roman Catholic
- Website: CatholicBarnsley.co.uk

History
- Status: Active
- Dedication: Feast of the Cross

Architecture
- Functional status: Parish church
- Heritage designation: Grade II listed
- Designated: 13 January 1986
- Architect: Edward Simpson
- Style: Gothic Revival
- Completed: 1905

Administration
- Province: Liverpool
- Diocese: Hallam
- Deanery: Barnsley
- Parish: Holy Rood

Holy Rood Church is a Roman Catholic Parish Church in Barnsley, South Yorkshire, England. It was opened in 1905. It is situated on the corner of Castlereagh Street and George Street, next to West Way in the town centre. It was designed by Edward Simpson and is a Grade II listed building.

== History ==
=== Foundation ===
In 1800, forty Catholics led by William Rigby met Fr Vincent Louis Dennis, a French priest who was in the area to tutor to the children of John Payne, the owner of Newhill Hall in Wath-upon-Dearne, who agreed to serve the local Catholic community. Fr Dennis died in 1819, but in 1822, the local congregation laid the foundations for a church which was completed in 1824. It was "a barn-like structure, utilitarian rather than beautiful" and was very soon outgrown by the increasing congregation. By the 1831 register, there had been 378 baptisms from the time Fr Dennis began his ministry, the first entry being in 1804. Through the efforts of the then Parish Priest, a second and larger church was opened in 1832, with schoolroom accommodation in the cellars beneath. This was eventually succeeded by a purpose built school opened in 1859.

=== Construction ===
In 1903 the foundation stone was laid for the present church of Holy Rood and the parish priest invited the Sisters of Mercy to open a mother house in Barnsley in order to support the parish in its work in the community. The site of the church, which was opened in 1905, is in an elevated position and its spire visible across the skyline of Barnsley town centre. The church was consecrated on 14 May 1919. It was designed by Bradford architects Edward Simpson and his son Charles Simpson.

The church is in the Late Victorian Gothic style, with a Welsh slate roof and a tower to the north-west of the building. The tower is square at its base and then becomes octagonal. The spire is stone and has gargoyles around it. The baptistry is to the south-west of the nave and has five sides.

Inside the church there are two marble sculptures of a Pietà and Saint Patrick, and two more stone sculptures of Saint Michael and Saint Anthony. Above these sculptures there is a frieze with the stations of cross inset into it. There is an organ gallery at back of the church and a lady chapel in the south part of the church.

== Parishes in Barnsley ==
The parish of Holy Rood church is associated with the parish of Our Lady and St James Church in Worsbrough. They share the same newsletter and are served by the same priest.

Our Lady and St James Church in Worsbrough was built in 1902 and designed by T. H. and F. Healey of Bradford who also designed St Luke's Church in Broomfields and St Bartholomew's Church in Ripley Ville. It was initially an Anglican church and dedicated to just Saint James. After it became disused, it was sold to the local Catholics and they rededicated it to Our Lady and St James. It is a Grade II listed building.

Holy Rood Church celebrates Sunday Mass at 9:30 and 11.00 am, and Our Lady and St James Church celebrates a vigil Mass at 6:00 pm on Saturday evening.

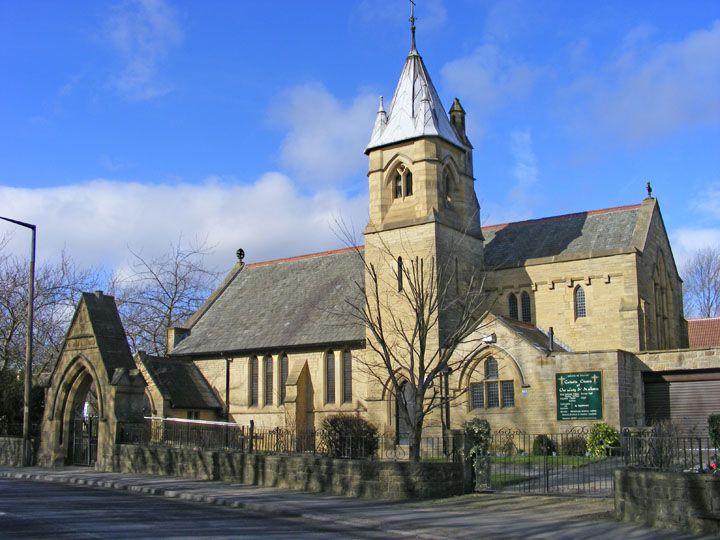
Our Lady and St James Church, Worsbrough

== See also ==
- Roman Catholic Diocese of Hallam
