= Bowling Park, Bradford =

Urban park in West Yorkshire, England

Bowling Park
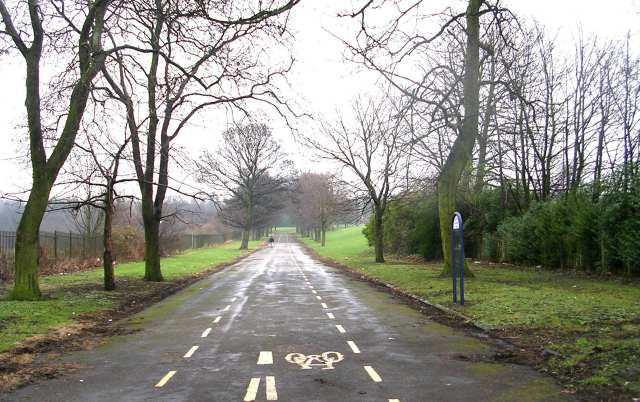
- Entrance to Bowling Park from Avenue Road
- Interactive map of Bowling Park
- Type: Urban Park
- Location: Bowling, Bradford, West Yorkshire
- Coordinates: 53°46′37″N 1°44′28″W
- Area: 50 acres (20 ha)
- Created: 1880
- Designated: Grade II on National Register of Historic Parks and Gardens
- Operator: City of Bradford, Parks and Landscape Services
- Status: open all year round

Bowling Park is a public urban park near Bolling Hall in Bradford, West Yorkshire, England about 1 1/2 miles (2.4 km) south south east from the city centre. The park is irregularly shaped with an area of 50 acres (20 ha) and is bounded by Bowling Hall Road, Burras Road, Bowling Memorial Cemetery, Parkside Road, Avenue Road, Bowling Park Allotments and Bowling Park Drive (formerly New Hey Road).

The park is grade II listed with English Heritage on their Register of Parks and Gardens of Special Historic Interest in England and is owned by the City of Bradford.

== History ==
In the late 1870s Bradford Council purchased large areas of land for the park, including part of the former grounds of Bolling Hall, Bradford. Earlier in the 19th century part of this land had been mined for coal and ironstone. In 1878 competitive plans were invited for the design of the park and later that year the plans by Kershaw and Hepworth of Brighouse were accepted.

The park was created between the years 1878 and 1880 and subsequently opened in 1880 by Angus Holden. The design of the created park however, differed significantly from the Kershaw and Hepworth plans. The Kershaw and Hepworth plans show a croquet lawn, a cricket ground and a large reservoir bordering the park in the east but none of these were ever constructed. In the 20th century various ponds in the park were filled in so that none remain today, and an area in the south-east of the park laid out for golf. Bowling greens, tennis courts and a second promenade were added in the 1920s. A free, weekly timed 5 km parkrun is held at 9am every Saturday.

== Landmarks ==
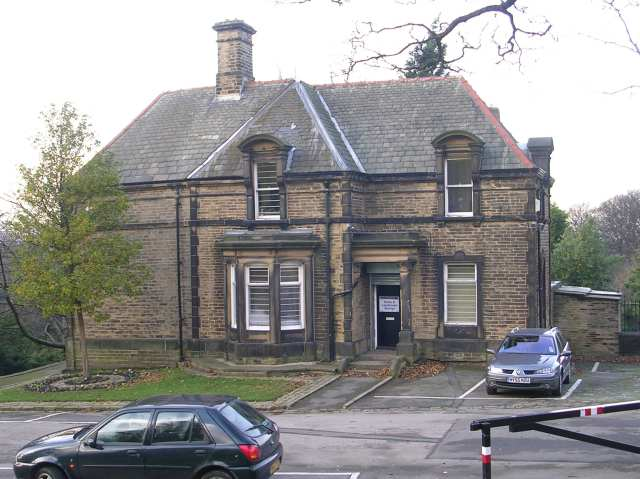
Park Lodge on Bowling Hall Road

The main carriage entrance is in the north-east on Bowling Hall Road at Lister Avenue. There is a second similar entrance in the north-west on Bowling Park Drive—both entrances having two-storey lodges. In the west, there is another entrance from West Bowling with a tree-lined embankment approach.

The lodge on Bowling Hall Road was developed for retail use, and became the Lodge Cafe since 2018, an award-winning alcohol-licenced daytime food and refreshment outlet with outdoor seating popular with park visitors. | Bowling Park Lodge Cafe

Running through the park is a serpentine carriageway within which are a series of interlinked curving paths that together with shrubs and trees enclose a series of irregularly shaped zones.

The site slopes down to the north west making it suitable for tobogganing in winter. There is a fenced off children's play area, a youth cafe, a multiactivities area, crown green bowling greens operated by the bowling club, and a pitch and putt course created in 1924. Elsewhere in the park are the base and roots of a fossilised tree. Friends Of Bowling Park is a voluntary organization who organize community fundays in the summer, and help keep the park free of litter, and along with Bradford Bees YMCA have helped establish Bowling Park Community Orchard.

After winning Bradford City of Culture in 2025, a temporary building called "The Beacon" was set up in the park from the 22nd of May to the 22nd of June. The Beacon featured a range of free events for all ages.The Beacon | Bradford 2025

== Access ==
Entry is free and the park is open to the public at all times. In the event of bad weather visitors have the option of going to Bolling Hall and Museum to the northeast on the other side of Bowling Hall Road. TLC Travel service 635 runs hourly from Bradford Interchange to Morrison's supermarket, Mayo Avenue and back, with the service 621 half-hourly on evenings and Sundays to and from Bierley and Haworth Road via Bradford Interchange.

== Gallery ==
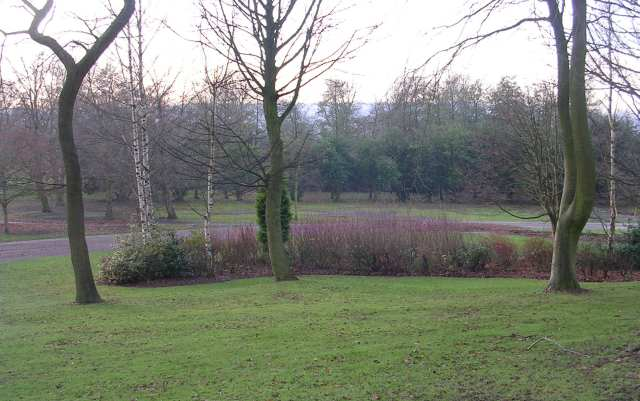
Bowling Hall Road
