= Marfords Park =

Park in Merseyside, England

Coordinates: 53.3248°N 2.9899°W

Marfords Park is a park located in Bromborough, Wirral, England.

Marfords Park comprises 19,000 square metres (1.9 hectares; 4.7 acres) and consists of a small playground area (designed for children under 12) and a larger grassed area. It is popular with young families and dog-walkers. The park is almost entirely bounded by residential properties in Marfords Avenue, Cunningham Drive and Granville Crescent, with pedestrian access from Marfords Avenue and Cunningham Drive.

Marfords Park is located within the Marfords Park Neighbourhood which has a Residents Association, the Marfords Park Neighbourhood Residents Association, which serves to represent the view of residents living within the Marfords Park Neighbourhood, bounded by Allport Road, the Wirral Line railway, Dibbinsdale Road and the Marfords Wood element of Brotherton Park and Dibbinsdale Local Nature Reserve (owned by the Lancelyn-Green family whose ancestral home has been Poulton Hall since 1093).

Marfords Park, as much of the residential land in Poulton and Dibbinsdale area, occupies land formerly owned by the Lancelyn-Greens. However, in the case of Marfords Park the land was not sold by the Lancelyn-Greens but donated with a deed of covenant restricting its future use by Cheshire County Council.

== Etymology ==
Marford means ford at the boundary and so Marfords refers to the crossings of the River Dibbin (one of which remains as Dibbinsdale Bridge) although originally the crossings would have literally been fords. Marfords Park is within the Clatterbridge Ward of the Wirral Council, the Clatter brook being a tributary to the River Dibbin.
