= Spital, Merseyside =

Coordinates: 53.341°N 3.001°W

Spital
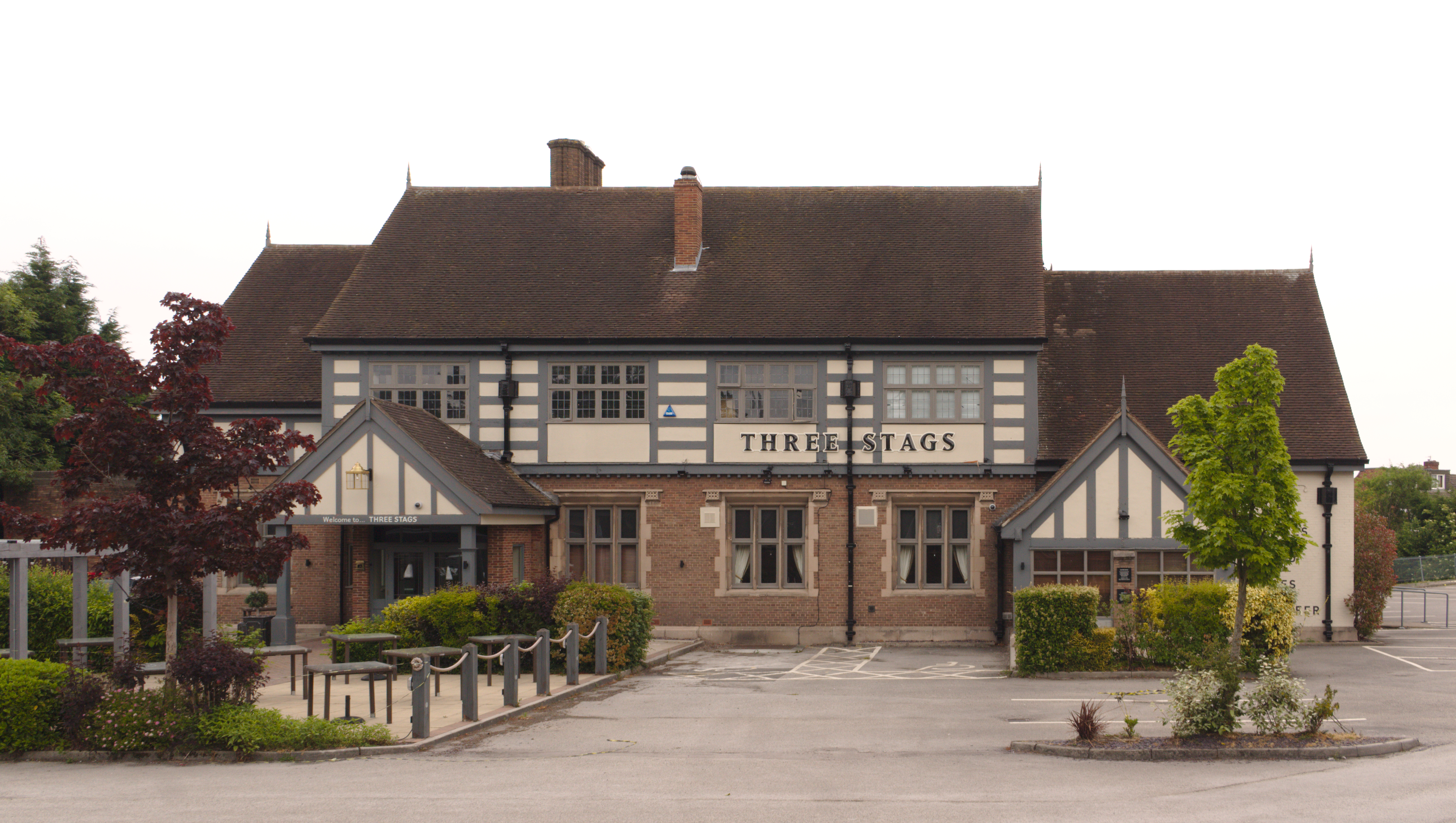
- The Three Stags public house, at the junction of the B5136 Church Road, the B5137 Brimstage Road/Spital Road and Poulton Road

- Location within Merseyside
- Population: 4,190 (2001 Census)
- OS grid reference: SJ3483
  - London: 176 mi (283 km) SE
- Metropolitan borough: Wirral
- Metropolitan county: Merseyside
- Region: North West
- Country: England
- Sovereign state: United Kingdom
- Post town: WIRRAL
- Postcode district: CH63
- Dialling code: 0151
- ISO 3166 code: GB-WRL
- Police: Merseyside
- Fire: Merseyside
- Ambulance: North West
- UK Parliament: Wirral West; Ellesmere Port and Bromborough

Spital (locally /ˈspɪtəl/) is a village in the Metropolitan Borough of Wirral, England within the Liverpool City Region. It occupies a central-eastern location on the Wirral Peninsula, and has become mostly incorporated into the town of Bebington due to urban sprawl, with its most easterly point also adjoining the northern edge of Bromborough.

Spital is primarily a residential suburb with houses and some apartments, within close proximity to the motorway network. Local businesses in the area include a cafe, a hat shop and two bars. There is also a primary school. The Brotherton Park and Dibbinsdale Nature Reserve is located in Spital.

== Toponym ==
The name "Spital" is a place or building known as a "spital house" that acted as a hospital or colony for lepers. However, the name might have been derived from the term "hospitality" - due to the large number of people working at the manorial estate in Poulton Lancelyn. Other original names of the village were "Poulton cum Spital" and "Spital Old Hall" until Spital was formally adopted at the end of the 19th century. It could also be a corruption of the Welsh ysbyty, as seen in place names like Spittal, Pembrokeshire.

== History ==
Legend has it that Irish patron saint, St Patrick, blessed a well in the local Brotherton Park during a trip to England.

Spital has a history spanning over 800 years. The first recorded dwelling in the area was a small chapel built sometime before AD 1183 with the name St. Thomas the Martyr. It is not known who built this chapel but was probably used by workers and owners of the Poulton Estate, founded in 1133 at nearby Poulton Lancelyn. In 1283, the brethren of Bebington were given licence to use the forested land where Spital stands today to be used as a hospital for lepers. This hospital was probably attached to the chapel already in the area, but there are no remains of this building today.

The area became more popular during the late 19th and 20th century after Spital Station on the Chester to Birkenhead railway was connected to the Mersey Railway line in 1891, and businessmen and workers could easily reach places of work, primarily in Liverpool. Spital was a particularly popular place to live with sea merchants and ships' captains due its proximity to the River Mersey and Irish Sea during the height of maritime activity in the area.

After the ending of the workhouse system in 1930, Wirral Workhouse was renamed Clatterbridge (County) General Hospital and under the National Health Service became Clatterbridge Hospital. In 1958, it became a centre specialising in Oncology. The centre was built in to enlarge cancer care services from a cramped site on Myrtle Street in Liverpool - since then the site has been expanded and the hospital has been awarded 3 out of 3 stars in the NHS scoring system.

== Geography ==
Spital is in the eastern part of the Wirral Peninsula, approximately 11.5 km (7.1 mi) south-south-east of the Irish Sea at New Brighton, 8 km (5 mi) east-north-east of the Dee Estuary at Gayton and about 2 km (1.2 mi) west of the River Mersey at Bromborough. The area is situated at an elevation of around 30 m (98 ft) above sea level.

== Governance ==
Historically Spital was situated within the UK Parliamentary Constituency of Wirral South. However, prior to the 2024 election Heswall and Clatterbridge were moved to the Wirral West constituency during a review of constituency boundaries. Since the 2024 general election the constituency Member of Parliament is Matthew Patrick (Labour).

Spital was originally part of Cheshire, until on 1 April 1974 it was absorbed into the new administrative county of Merseyside created through the reforms of the Local Government Act 1972. Spital has since grown and is now adjacent to the larger town of Bebington which borders Birkenhead. In 1986 the county of Merseyside was abolished and the Metropolitan Borough of Wirral, of which Spital was part, became in effect a unitary authority for local government purposes. Despite this change the relevant police force remains Merseyside Police and the relevant fire service is Merseyside Fire and Rescue Service. In 2014 some local government activities were transferred to the Liverpool City Region Combined Authority after the Metropolitan Borough of Wirral became one of the local authorities within it.

At local government level, Spital and the neighbouring village of Poulton Lancelyn are part of the Clatterbridge Ward of the Metropolitan Borough of Wirral.

== Demography ==
- 1801 - 87
- 1851 - 294
- 1901 - 487
- 1951 - 1,257
- 2001 - 4,190

The 2001 Census shows the population of Spital to be 4,190. This was composed of 2,010 (47.97%) males and 2,180 (52.03%) females. There were 1,660 households.

== Transport ==
=== Road ===
The M53 motorway, A41 road and B5137 road pass through or near the area.

=== Bus ===
Regular bus services, operated on behalf of Merseytravel, leave Spital cross-roads for various destinations around Merseyside.

=== Rail ===
Despite its small size, the area is served by Spital railway station on the Wirral Line of the Merseyrail network, with frequent services to Liverpool, Chester and Ellesmere Port. The station is staffed from early in the morning through to 10 minutes before the last train at night and there is a free car park with space for over 40 vehicles.

== Notable people ==
- Former British Prime Minister Harold Wilson spent his adolescent years living in Spital.
- Paul Heaton Singer/Songwriter from The Housemartins and The Beautiful South was born in Spital.
- Former football player Andy van der Meyde lived in Spital during his time at Everton FC.
