= British Transport Hotels =

Hotel and catering business of the British national railway system

British Transport Hotels (BTH) was the hotels and catering business of the nationalised railway system in Great Britain.

== History ==
=== Origins of the company ===
Britain's private railway companies pioneered the concept of the railway hotel, initially at locations such as London Euston and Birmingham Curzon Street where hotels were opened at the start of trunk railway operation in 1839. Most of the railway companies followed suit, and by 1913 there were 93 railway owned hotels. After grouping, the policies of the 'big four' railway companies differed considerably: the LMS and LNER, which had the longest routes, were the most enthusiastic.

Railway-owned hotels at nationalisation in 1948
Company	Hotels	Bedrooms	Guests
LMS	26	2,429	748,765
LNER	17	2,328	449,355
GWR	4	336	136,307
SR	2	224	75,000

=== The Hotels Executive (1948–53) ===
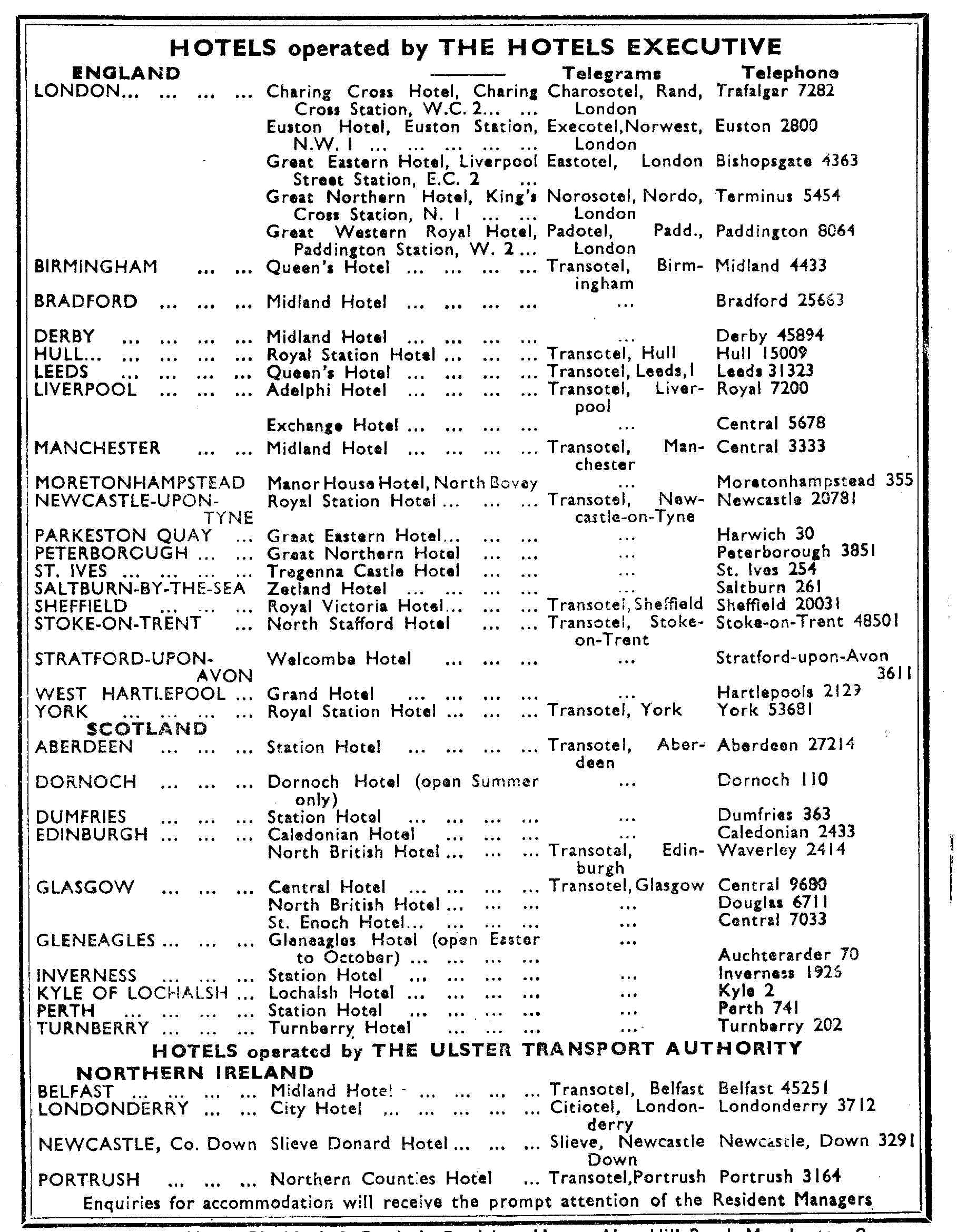
The list of Hotels Executive properties, 1952

At the nationalisation of transport in Great Britain on 1 January 1948, and the establishment of the British Transport Commission, hotels and catering came under the control of BTC's Railway Executive. However, on 1 July 1948 they were separated from direct railway control and placed under British Transport Commission's Hotels Executive, chaired by Lord Inman, who was later succeeded by Sir Harry Methven. At this point the Hotels Executive acquired 55 hotels and 400 station refreshment rooms, along with various golf courses, tennis courts, laundries, wine cellars, bottling stores and even a farm (at St Ives in Cornwall).

=== British Transport Hotel and Catering Services (1953–63) ===
The Conservative government elected in 1951 sought to alter the structure of the British Transport Commission and its subsidiaries. One consequence was that the Hotels Executive was abolished on 19 August 1953, and the BTC took direct control, establishing a "Hotel and Catering Services Division" to run them. Sir Harry Methven, the last Chairman of the Hotels Executive, became a member of the BTC.

=== British Transport Hotels Ltd (1963–83) ===
In 1962 the BTC was abolished, and its rail businesses were transferred to the newly established British Railways Board. The BRB Chairman, Richard Beeching, argued for the retention of the hotels within the BRB's rail portfolio, and BTH Ltd was established to manage them. The intention was to give BTH a high degree of autonomy, including bringing in outside expertise in the hotel business to the BTH board. The Railways Act 1968 empowered BTH to expand beyond the railway estate, and the company considered opening a number of new hotels. In the event only one such hotel was opened – the Old Course at St Andrews – in 1968, before the Conservative government elected in 1970 stopped further expansion. The remainder of the hotel estate was rationalised: the 34 hotels inherited by BTH had been reduced to 29 by 1979.

=== The end (1983–84) ===
Following the victory of the Conservative Party at the 1979 general election, led by Prime Minister Margaret Thatcher, and the deteriorating economic situation, pressure was put on nationalised industries such as British Rail to consider asset disposal. It was not long before the BTH hotels were under review. The management at the time, led by Peter Land, tried to establish a viable structure for a management buyout, which would have kept the group more or less intact and would have delivered a smooth transfer to the private sector. As Peter Land notes in his book Sauce Supreme, politics rendered this plan impossible and the hotels were sold by open tender, realising a much lower value for the UK taxpayer than the management buyout would have done. By 1984, the disposal was complete and the history of BTH was at an end.

== List of hotels in 1948 ==
The British Transport Commission took over the following hotels from the big four railway companies in 1948:

Name	Location	Subsequent history
From the Great Western Railway
Fishguard Bay Hotel	Fishguard	(sold 1950, closed 2020)
Grand Pump Room Hotel	Bath	(sold 1956, now demolished)
Great Western Royal Hotel	Paddington, London	(sold 1983, still operating, now known as Hilton London Paddington)
Manor House Hotel	Moretonhampstead, Devon	(sold 1983, still operating, now known as Bovey Castle)
Tregenna Castle Hotel	St Ives, Cornwall	(sold 1983, still operating)
From the London, Midland and Scottish Railway
Adelphi Hotel	Liverpool	(sold 1983, still operating)
Caledonian Hotel	Edinburgh	(sold 1981, still operating, at the former Caledonian Railway's Princes Street station)
Central Hotel	Glasgow	(sold 1983, still operating, now known as the voco Grand Central Hotel)
Crewe Arms Hotel	Crewe	(sold 1952, closed 2021)
Dornoch Hotel	Dornoch	(sold 1965, still operating)
Euston Hotel	London	(closed and demolished 1963)
Exchange Hotel	Liverpool	(closed 1971)
Gleneagles Hotel	Auchterarder	(sold 1981, still operating)
Highland Hotel	Strathpeffer	(sold 1958, still operating)
Lochalsh Hotel	Kyle of Lochalsh	(sold 1983, still operating)
Midland Hotel	Bradford	(closed 1975, reopened 1993)
Midland Hotel	Derby	(sold 1983, still operating)
Midland Hotel	Manchester	(sold 1983, still operating)
Midland Hotel	Morecambe	(sold 1952, subsequently closed. Reopened in 2008)
North Stafford Hotel	Stoke-on-Trent	(sold 1953, still operating)
Park Hotel	Preston	(sold 1950, closed)
Queen's Hotel	Birmingham	(closed 1965)
Queen's Hotel	Leeds	(sold 1984, still operating)
St Enoch Hotel	Glasgow	(closed and demolished 1974)
Station Hotel	Ayr	(sold 1951, closed 2012)
Station Hotel	Dumfries	(sold 1972, still operating)
Station Hotel	Holyhead	(closed 1951, demolished late 1970s.)
Station Hotel	Inverness	(sold 1983, still operating - now named the Royal Highland Hotel)
Station Hotel	Perth	(sold 1983, operated until 2022 as Radisson Blu Perth)
Turnberry Hotel	Turnberry	(sold 1983, still operating)
Welcombe Hotel	Stratford-upon-Avon	(sold 1983, still operating)
From the London and North Eastern Railway
Cruden Bay Hotel	Port Erroll	(sold 1951, closed)
Felix Hotel	Felixstowe	(sold 1952, closed)
Grand Hotel	West Hartlepool	(sold 1983, still operating)
Great Eastern Hotel	Liverpool Street, London	(sold 1983, still operating, now known as Andaz Liverpool Street)
Great Eastern Hotel	Parkeston Quay, Harwich	(closed 1963)
Great Northern Hotel	King's Cross, London	(sold 1983, still operating)
Great Northern Hotel	Peterborough	(sold 1983, still operating)
Great Northern Station Hotel	Leeds	(sold 1952, closed)
Great Northern Victoria Hotel	Bradford	(sold 1952, still operating)
North British Station Hotel	Glasgow	(sold 1984, still operating, now known as the Millennium Hotel)
North British Station Hotel	Edinburgh	(sold 1981, still operating, now known as the Balmoral Hotel)
Royal Hotel	Grimsby	(sold 1949, closed and demolished late 1960's.)
Royal Station Hotel	York	(sold 1983, still operating, now known as The Milner York)
Royal Station Hotel	Hull	(sold 1983, still operating)
Royal Station Hotel	Newcastle upon Tyne	(sold 1983, still operating)
Royal Victoria Station Hotel	Sheffield	(sold 1982, still operating, now known as the Crowne Plaza Royal Victoria)
Sandringham Hotel	Hunstanton	(sold 1950, closed)
Station Hotel	Aberdeen	(sold 1983, still operating)
Yarborough Hotel	Grimsby	(sold 1952, still operating)
Zetland Hotel	Saltburn-by-the-Sea	(sold 1976, closed)
From the Southern Railway
Charing Cross Hotel	Charing Cross, London	(sold 1983, still operating, now known as The Clermont London Charing Cross)
Craven Hotel	Charing Cross, London	(sold 1963, closed)
Grosvenor Hotel	Victoria, London	(sold 1983, still operating, now known as The Clermont London Victoria)
Knowle Hotel	Sidmouth	(sold 1951, closed)

== Gallery ==
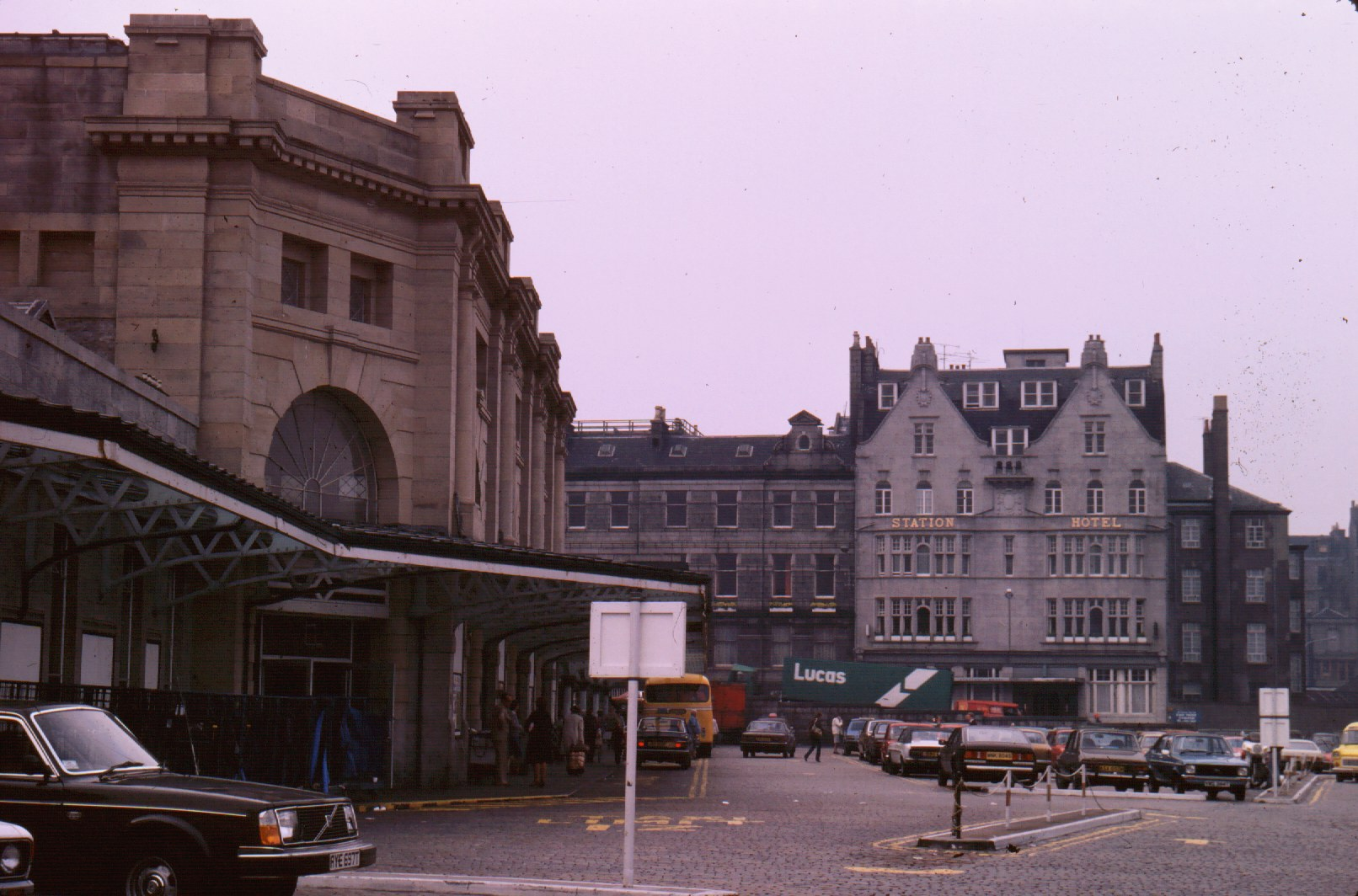
Station Hotel, Aberdeen

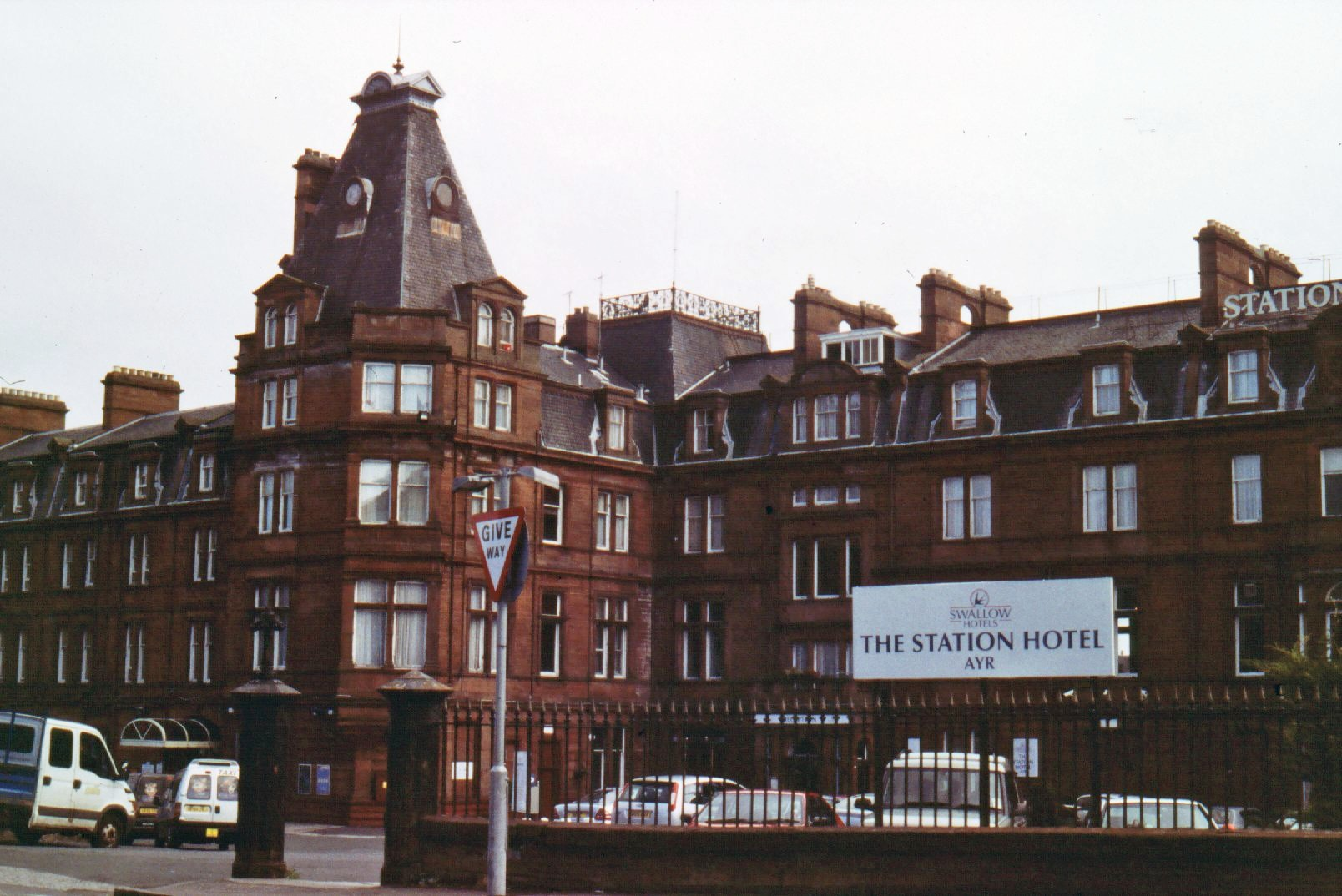
Station Hotel, Ayr

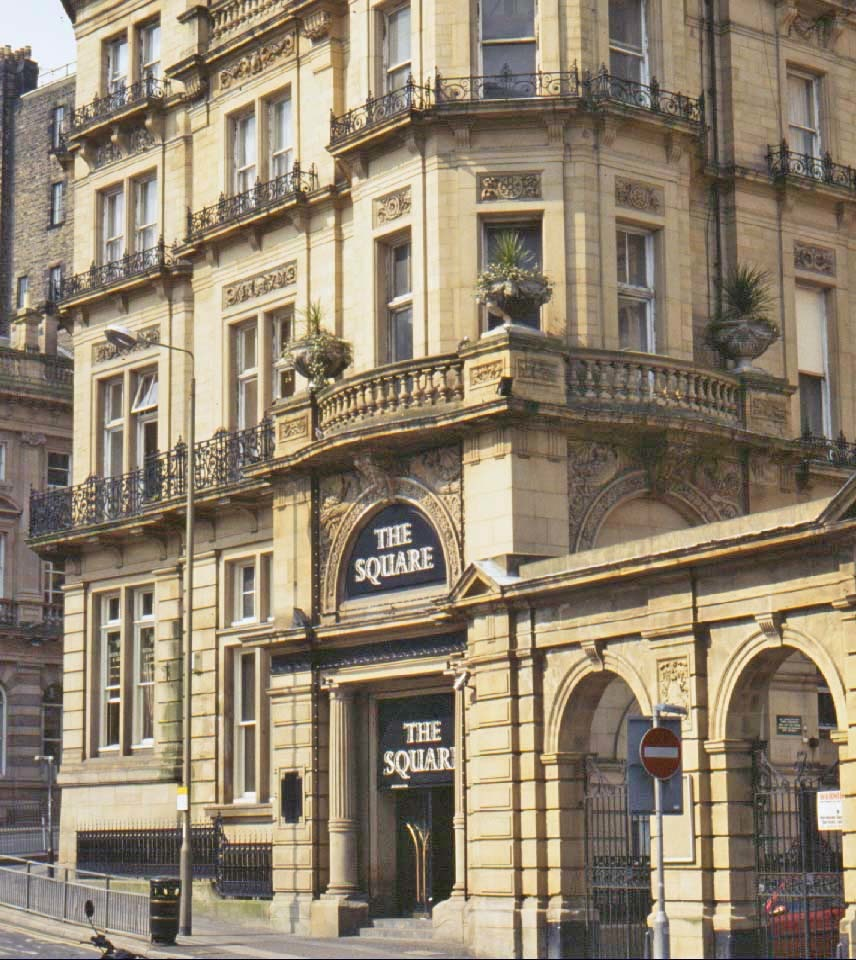
Midland Hotel, Bradford

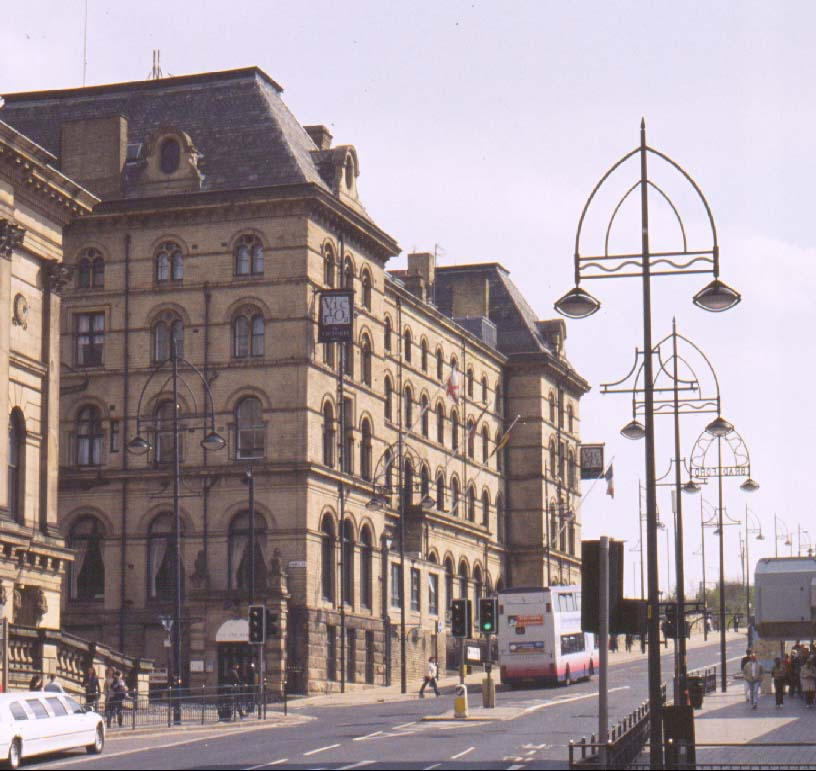
Victoria Hotel, Bradford

Station Hotel, Dumfries

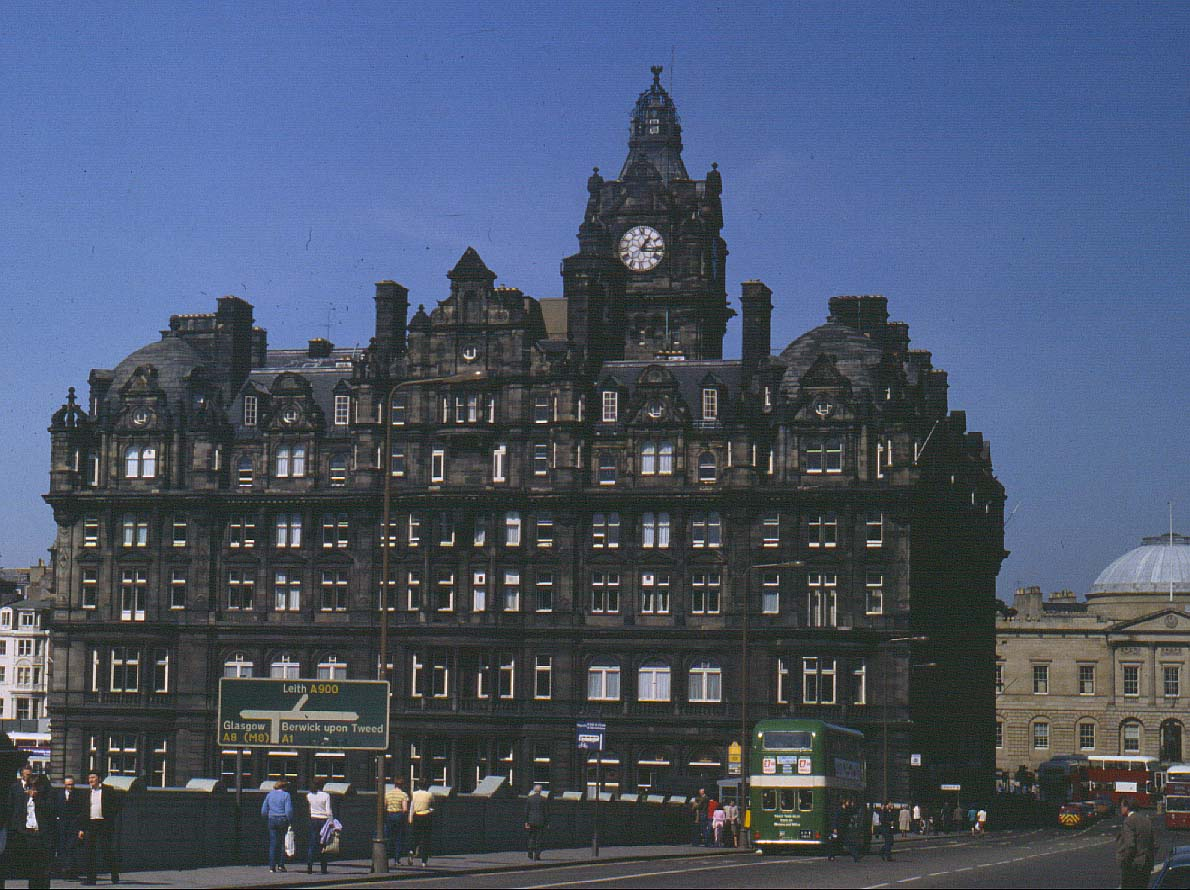
North British Hotel, Edinburgh (now the Balmoral)

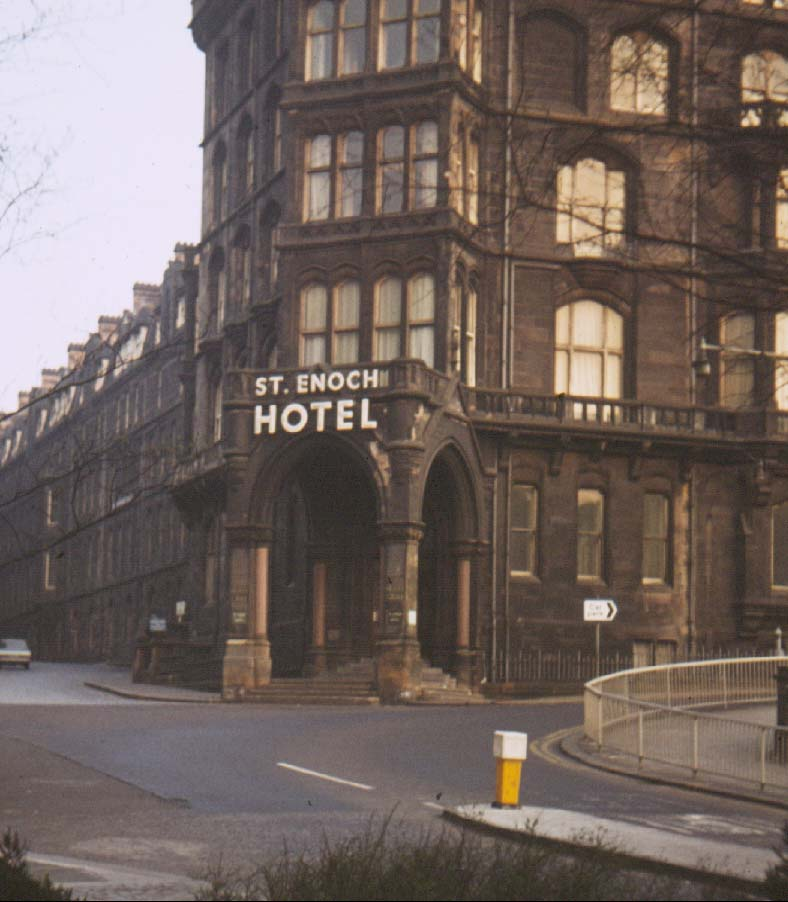
St Enoch Hotel, Glasgow

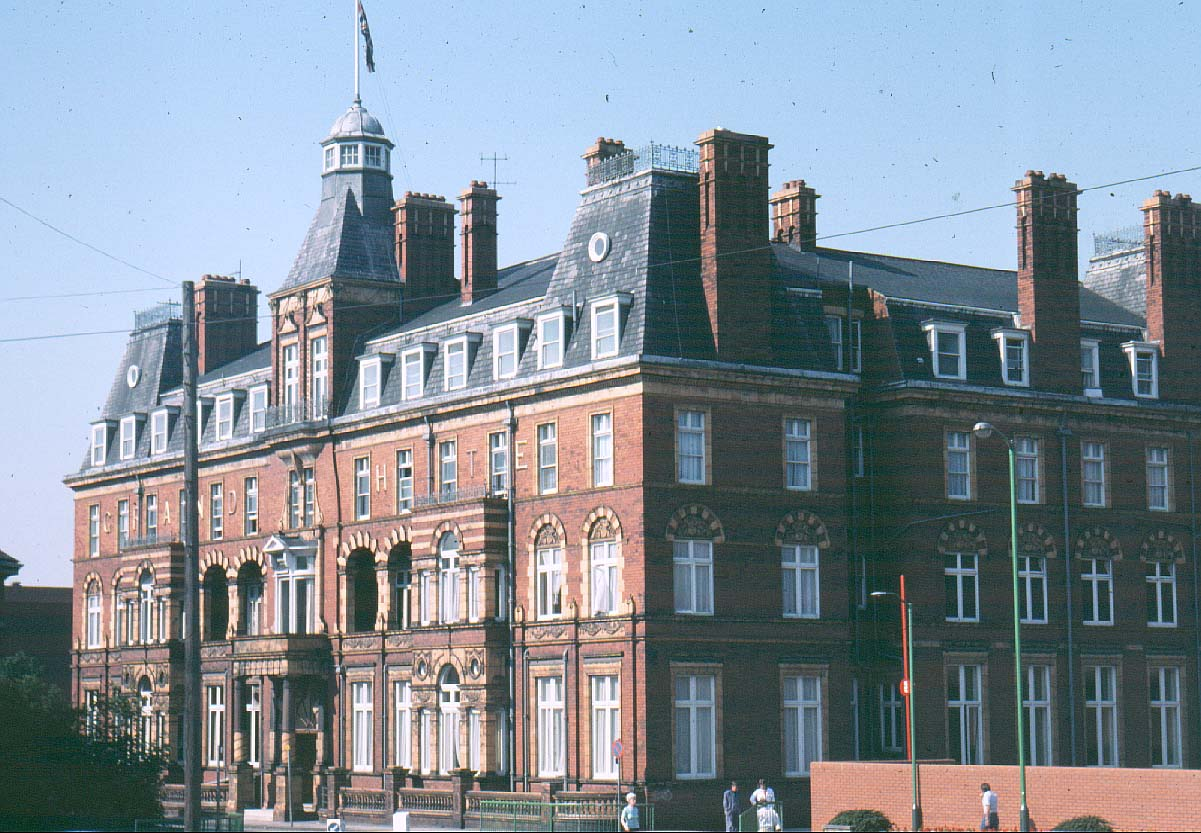
Grand Hotel, Hartlepool

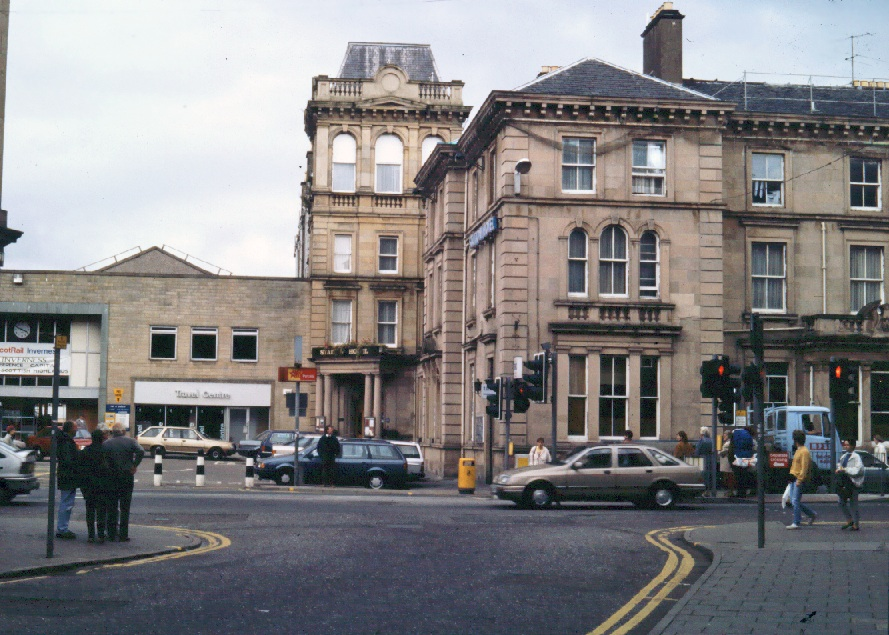
Station Hotel, Inverness (now the Royal Highland)

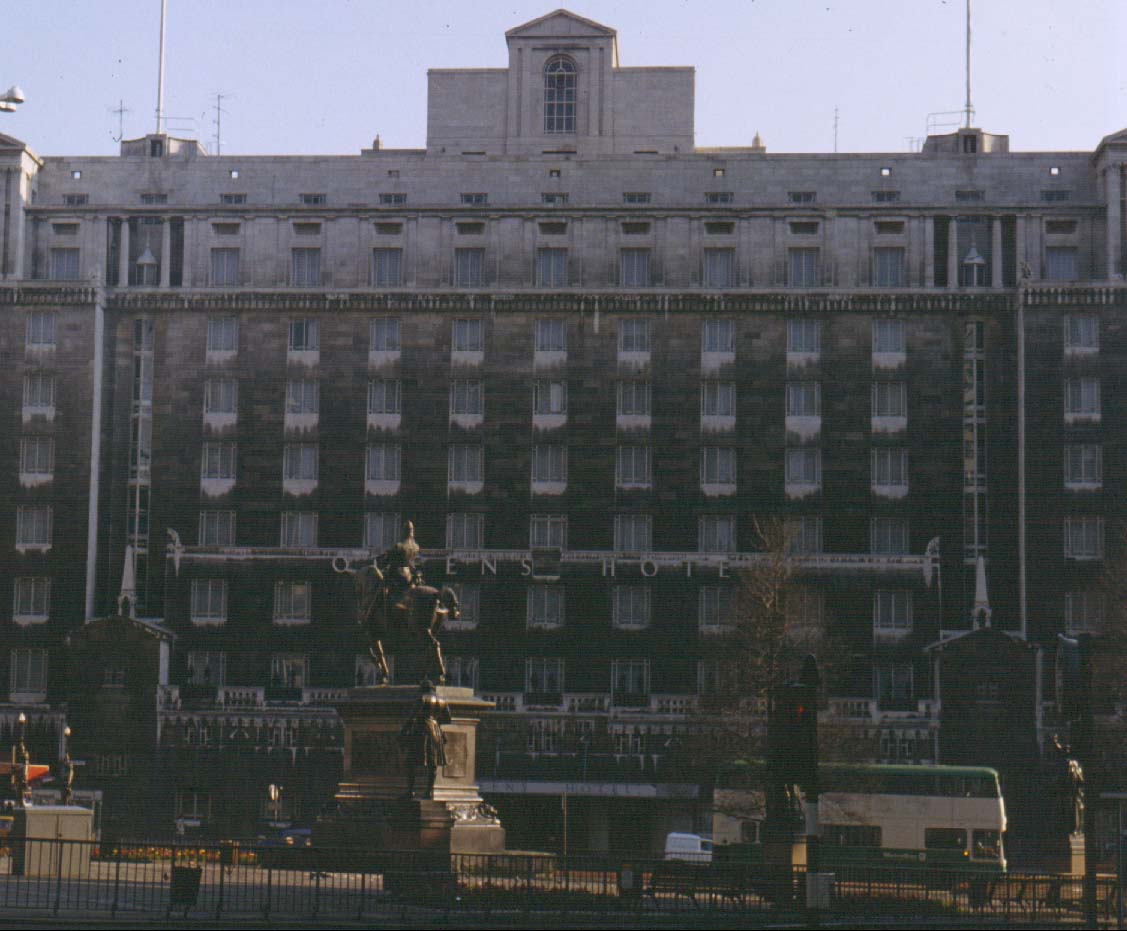
Queen's Hotel, Leeds

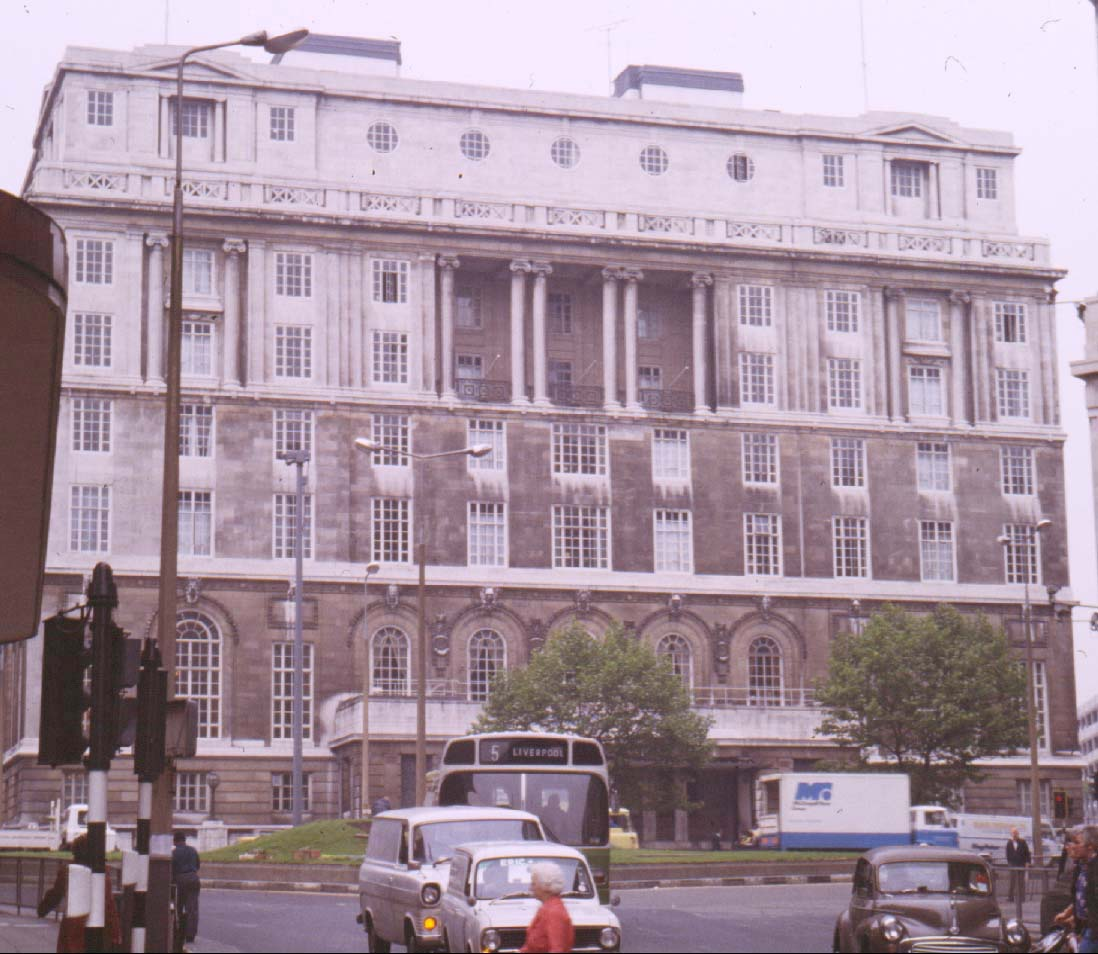
Adelphi Hotel, Liverpool (exterior)

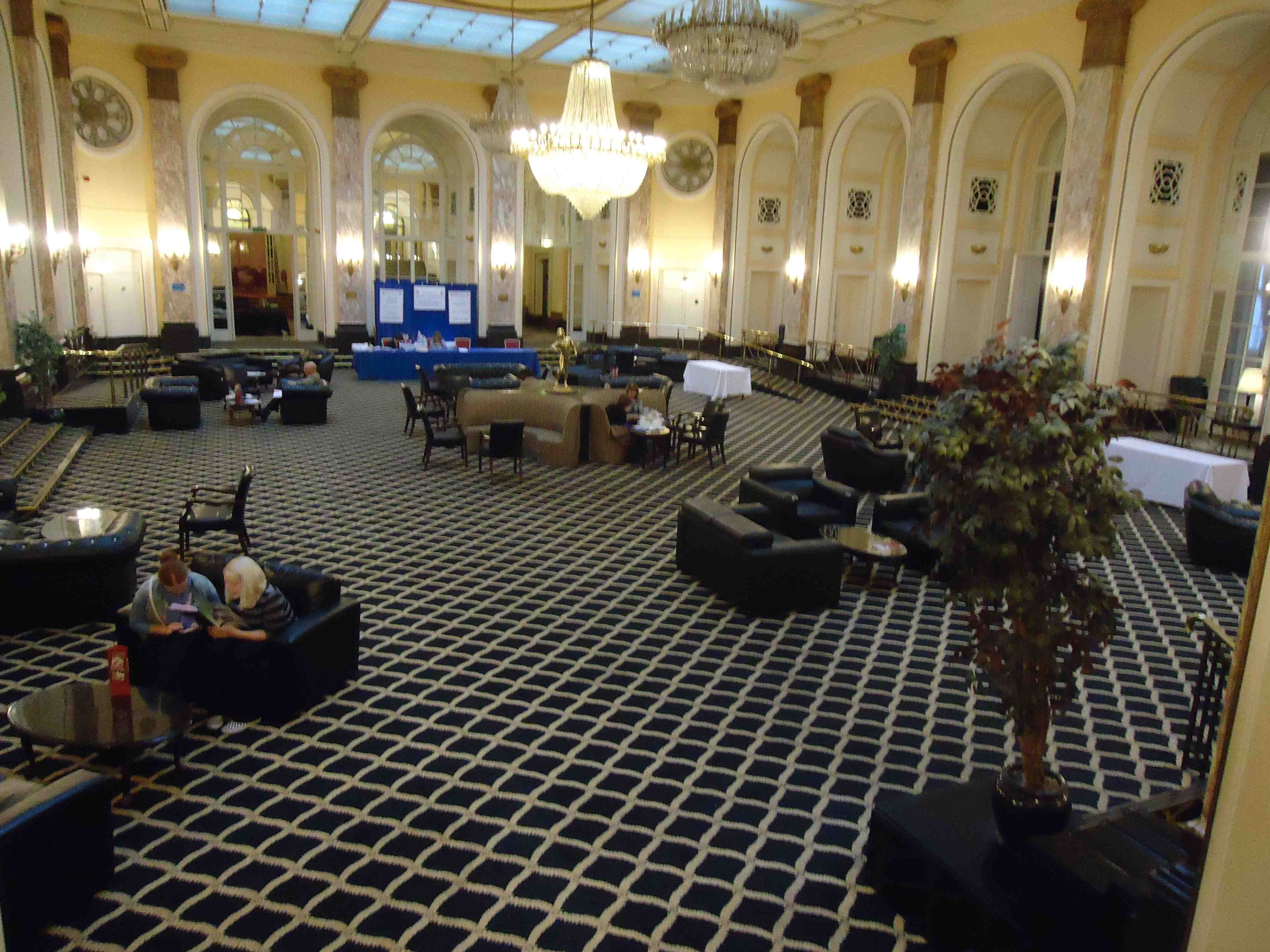
Adelphi Hotel, Liverpool (interior, 2014)

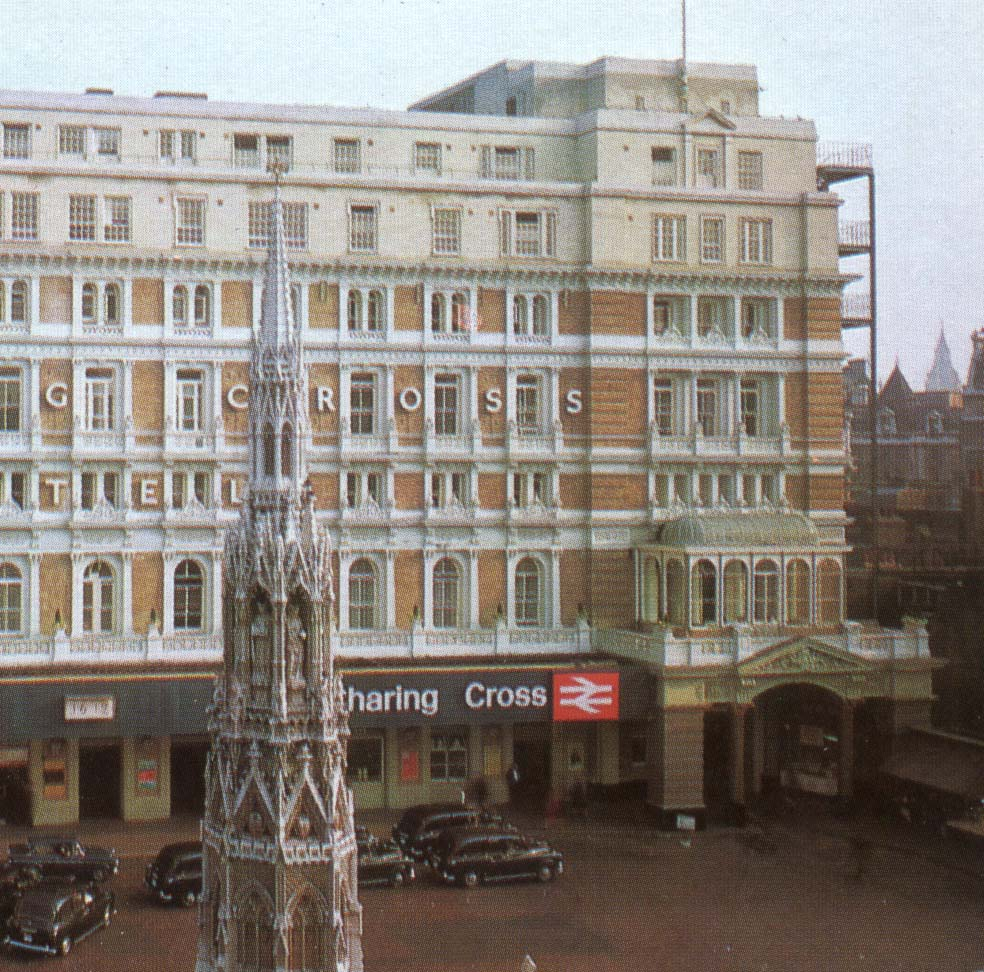
Charing Cross Hotel, Charing Cross, London

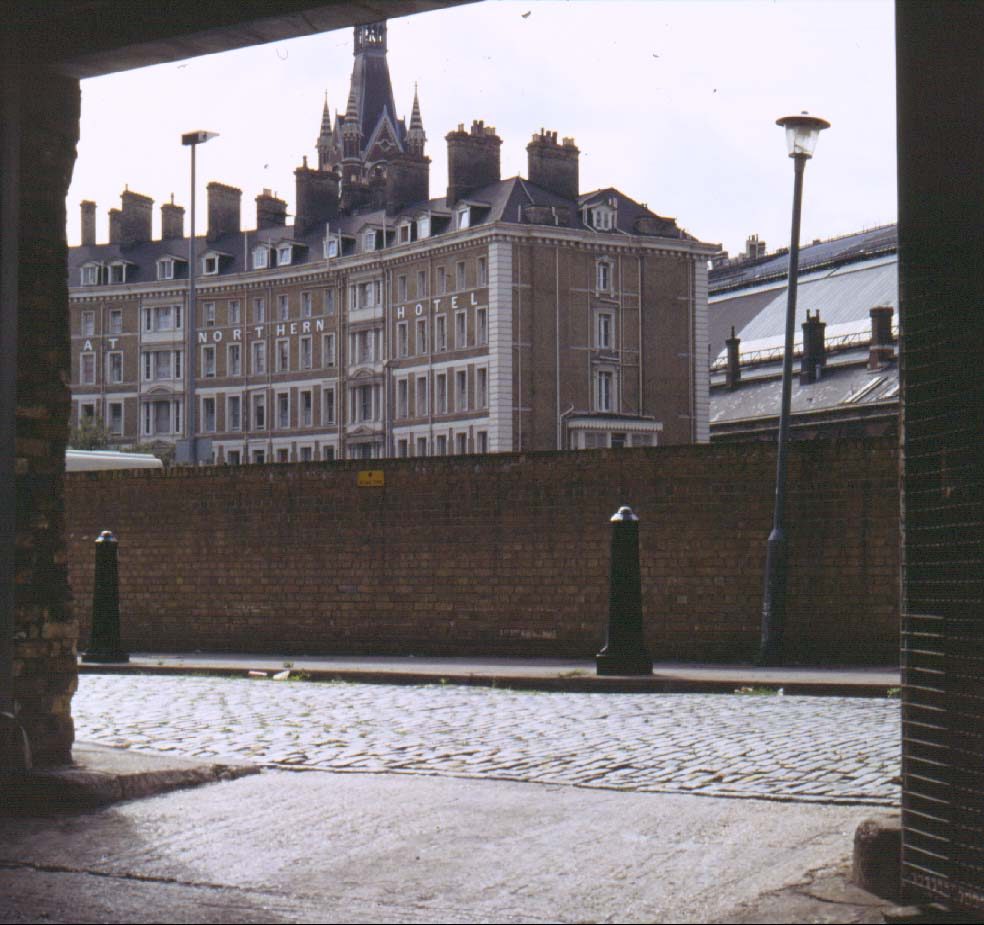
Great Northern Hotel, Kings Cross, London (before redevelopment)

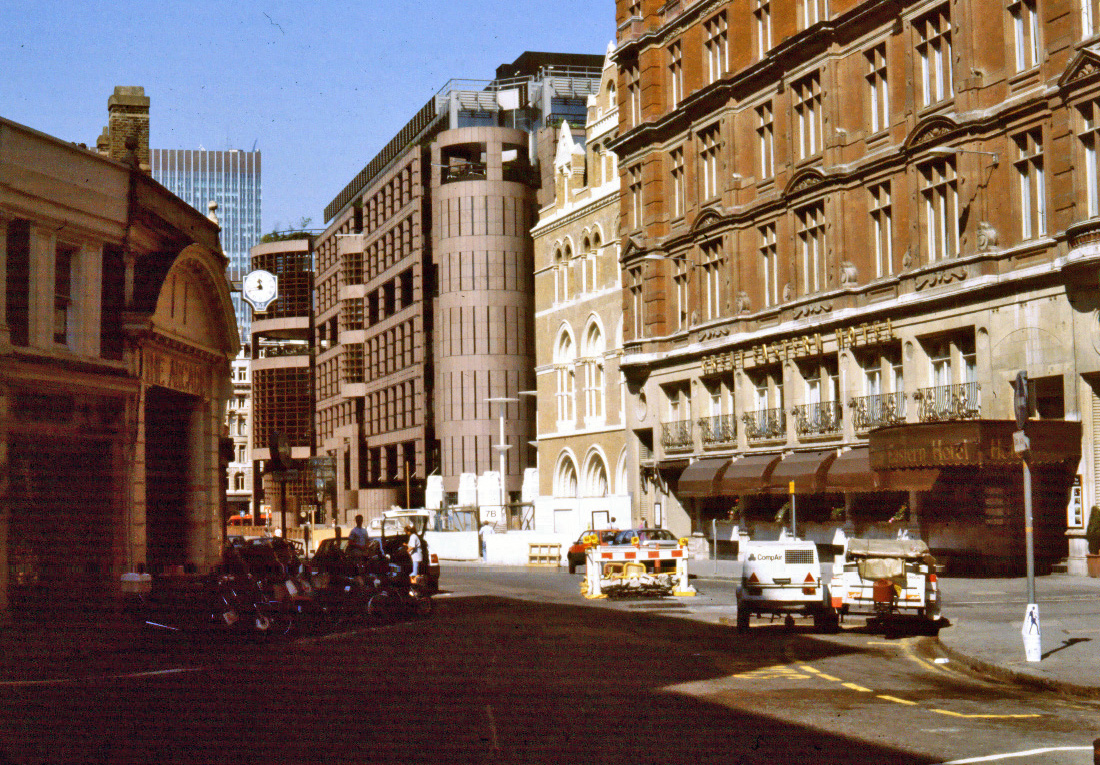
Great Eastern Hotel, Liverpool Street, London (now Andaz)

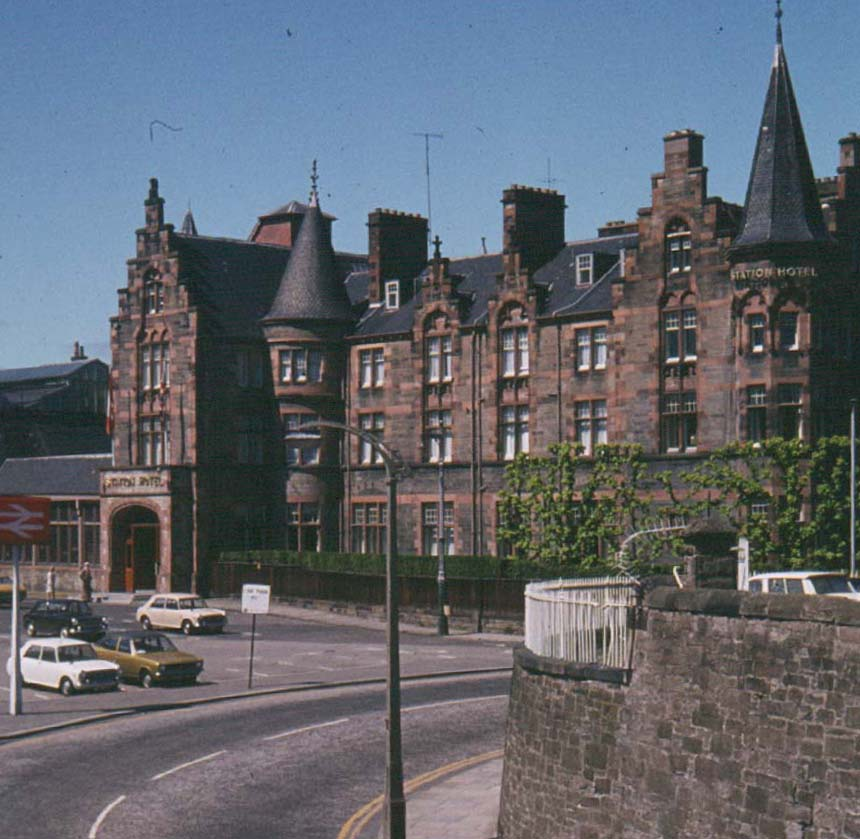
Station Hotel, Perth

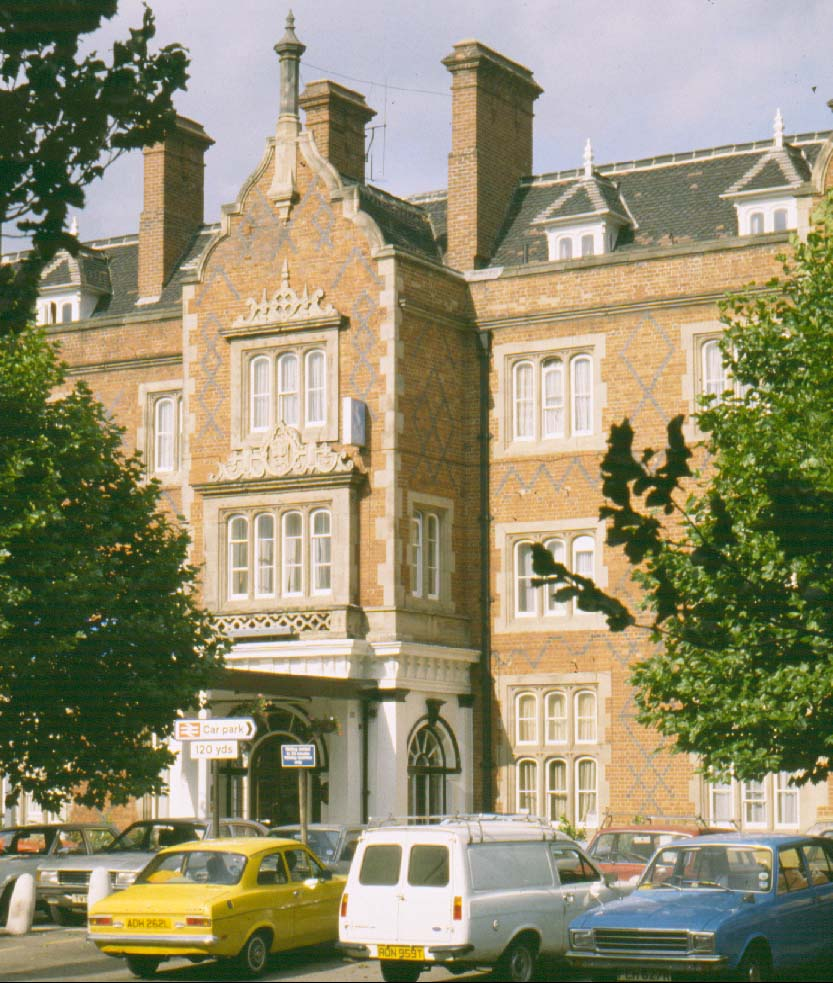
North Staffordshire Hotel, Stoke-on-Trent

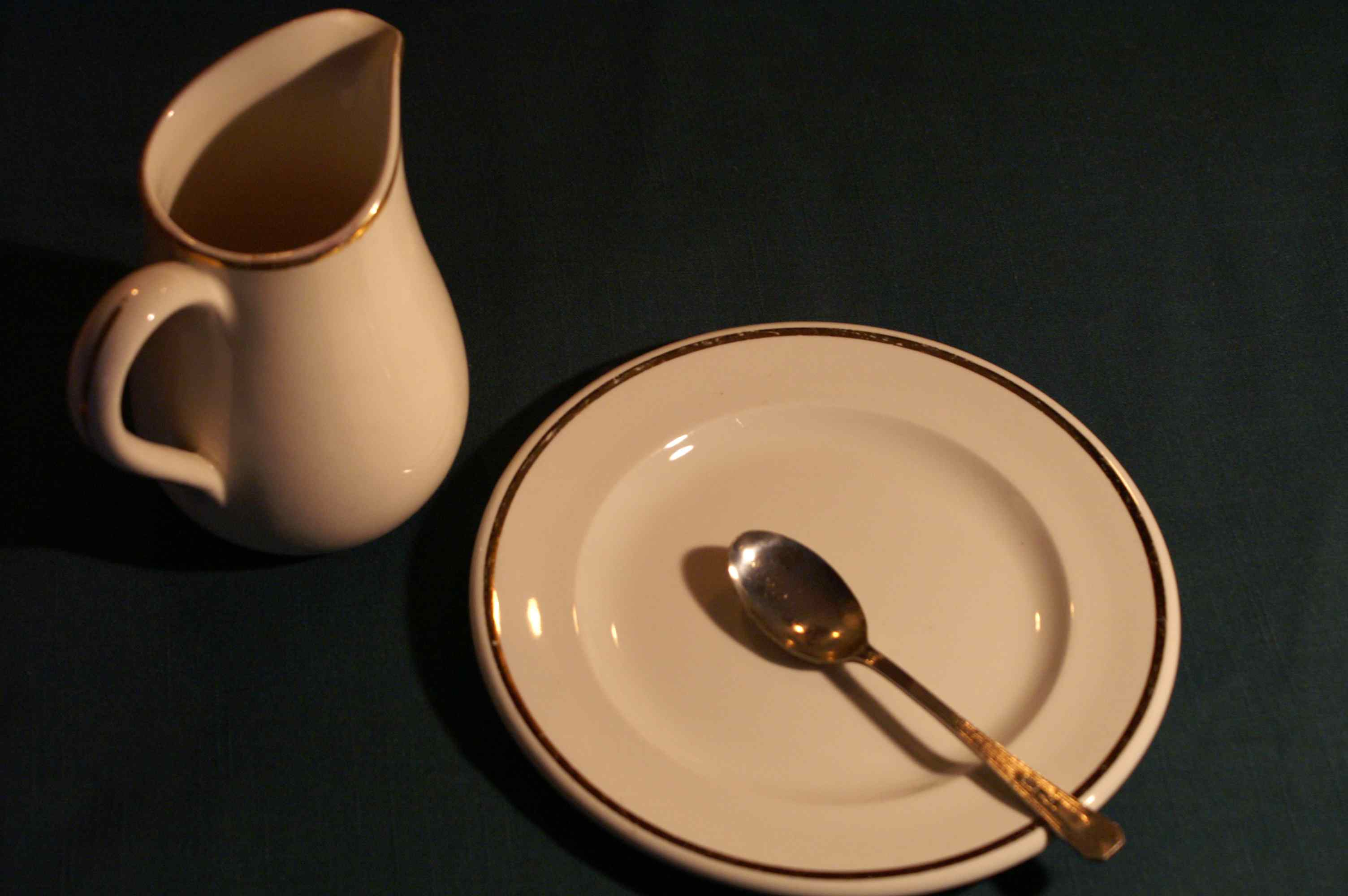
BTH table setting
