= Bromborough =

Town in Merseyside, England

Coordinates: 53.336°N 2.978°W

- Town
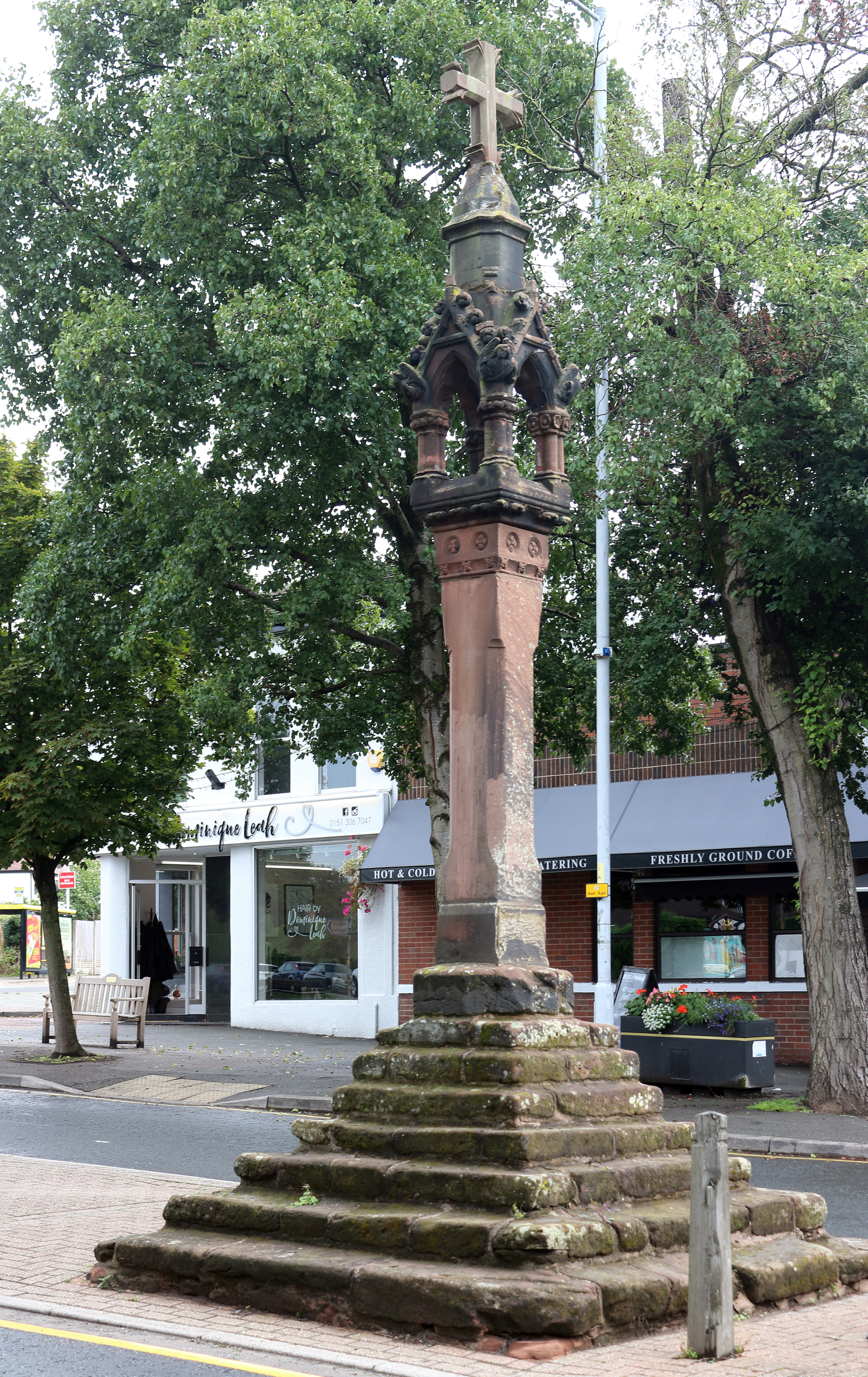
- Bromborough Cross

- Location within Merseyside
- Population: 14,850 (2011 census) (Note: The ONS 2011 population figure is for Bromborough Ward, which includes New Ferry, Port Sunlight and part of Spital)
- OS grid reference: SJ349825
  - London: 175 mi (282 km) SE
- Metropolitan borough: Wirral
- Metropolitan county: Merseyside
- Region: North West
- Country: England
- Sovereign state: United Kingdom
- Post town: WIRRAL
- Postcode district: CH62 and CH63
- Dialling code: 0151
- ISO 3166 code: GB-WRL
- Police: Merseyside
- Fire: Merseyside
- Ambulance: North West
- UK Parliament: Ellesmere Port and Bromborough

Bromborough (/ˈbrɒmbərə/ BROM-bər-ə) is a town in the Metropolitan Borough of Wirral, Merseyside, England, on the Wirral Peninsula south-east of Bebington and north of Eastham. It lies within the historic county boundaries of Cheshire, and became part of Merseyside in 1974.

At the 2011 census, the population of the Bromborough ward was 14,850.

== History ==
The name Brunanburh is suggested to mean "Bruna's fortification", with burh being Old English for a fortified place.

Bromborough is a contender for the site of an epic battle of 937, the Battle of Brunanburh, which confirmed England as a united Anglo-Saxon kingdom. The philological case for Bromborough as Brunanburh has been questioned, on the basis that the first element in the name may be 'brown' and not 'Bruna'. Bromborough would therefore be 'the brown [stone-built] manor or fort'.

An Anglo-Saxon cross, reconstructed from fragments, is in the churchyard of local parish church St Barnabas. Bromborough is not specifically named in the Domesday Survey, and the name does not appear in records until the 12th century.

A market charter allowing a market to be held each Monday was granted by Edward I in 1278 to the monks of St. Werburgh's Abbey. It was hoped that establishing the market in the vicinity of Bromborough Cross would promote honest dealing. The market cross was the traditional centre of the village and also an assembly point for local farm labourers available for hire. The steps of the cross are from the original 13th-century monument. The cross itself is a more recent reproduction, presented to the town by the Bromborough Society.

With a watermill having been recorded near Bromborough at the time of the Domesday Survey, Bromborough watermill was likely to have been the oldest mill site on the Wirral. Located on the River Dibbin at what is known as Spital Dam, it was worked until 1940 and demolished in 1949. The site is now a children's nursery. A windmill, built in 1777, existed on higher ground also at the same location. Having fallen into disuse and much deteriorated, it was destroyed by gunpowder in about 1878.

An increase in traffic passing through the area resulted in Bromborough undergoing extensive redevelopment in the 1930s. Bromborough Hall, built in 1617, was demolished in 1932 to make way for a by-pass and a number of farmhouses and cottages in the area of Bromborough Cross were replaced with shops.

== Geography ==
Bromborough is situated on the eastern side of the Wirral Peninsula, on the western side of the River Mersey. The area is approximately 12.5 km (7.8 mi) south-southeast of the Irish Sea at New Brighton and about 8 km (5.0 mi) east-northeast of the Dee Estuary at Parkgate. Bromborough Cross is at an elevation of about 32 m (105 ft) above sea level.

== Landmarks ==
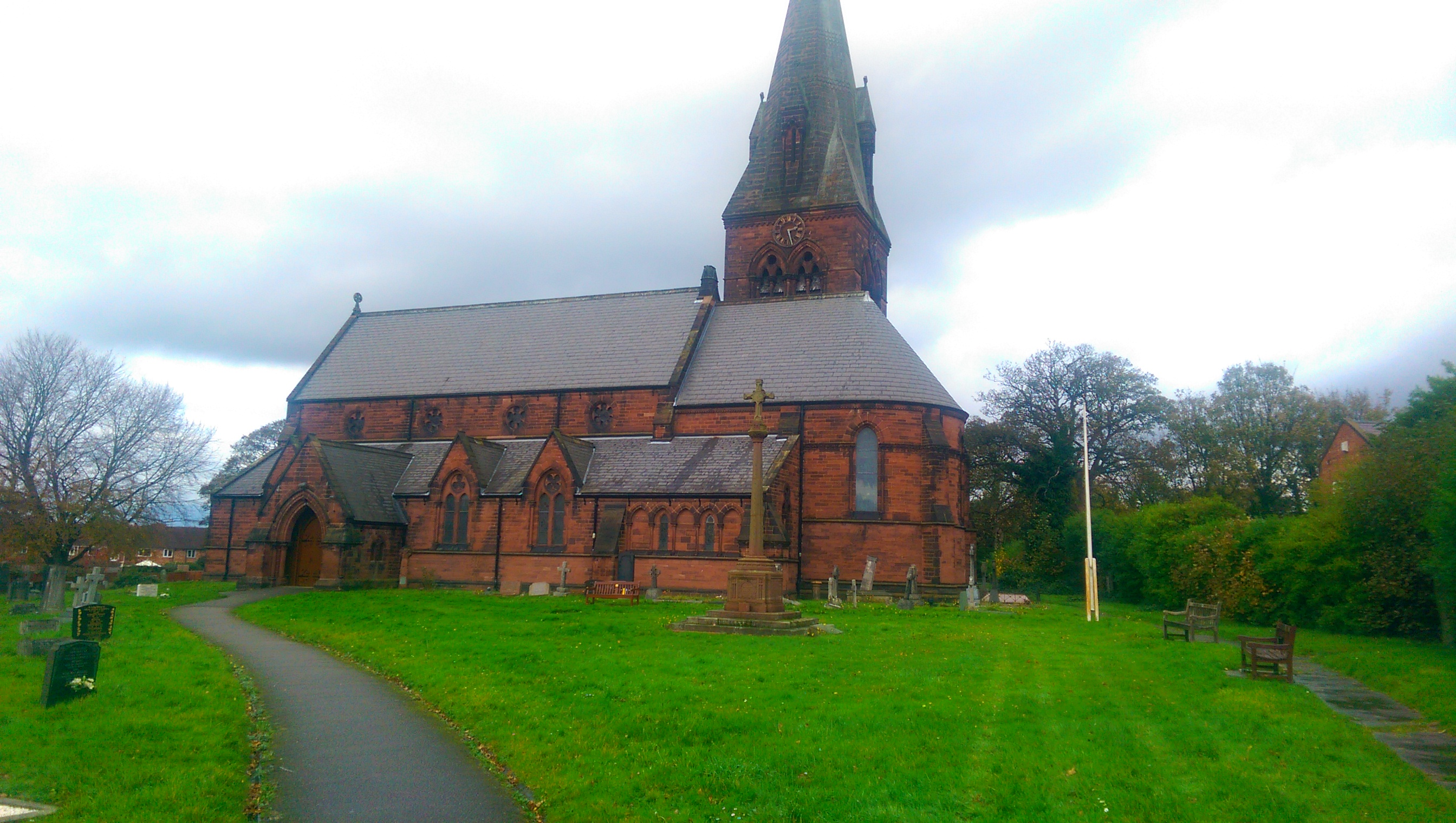
Church of St Barnabas

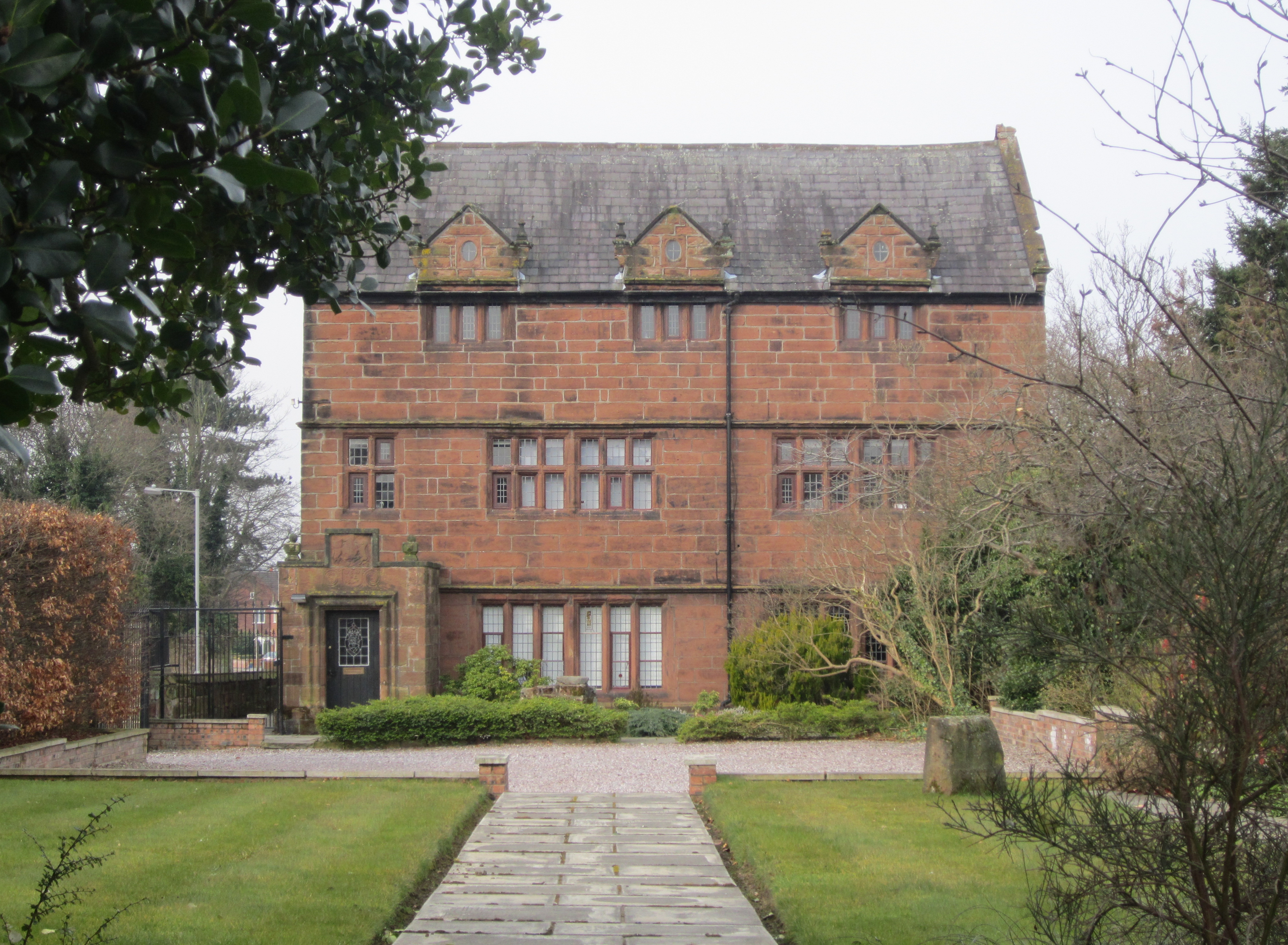
Stanhope House

The partially medieval Bromborough Cross, in the old village centre, is a designated Grade II* listed building. St Barnabas' Church, designed by George Gilbert Scott, is also Grade II* listed and was constructed in the 1860s to replace a smaller church. Both Stanhope House and Pear Tree Cottage are Grade II listed and are amongst several buildings from the late seventeenth century that survive in the modern town.

== Community ==
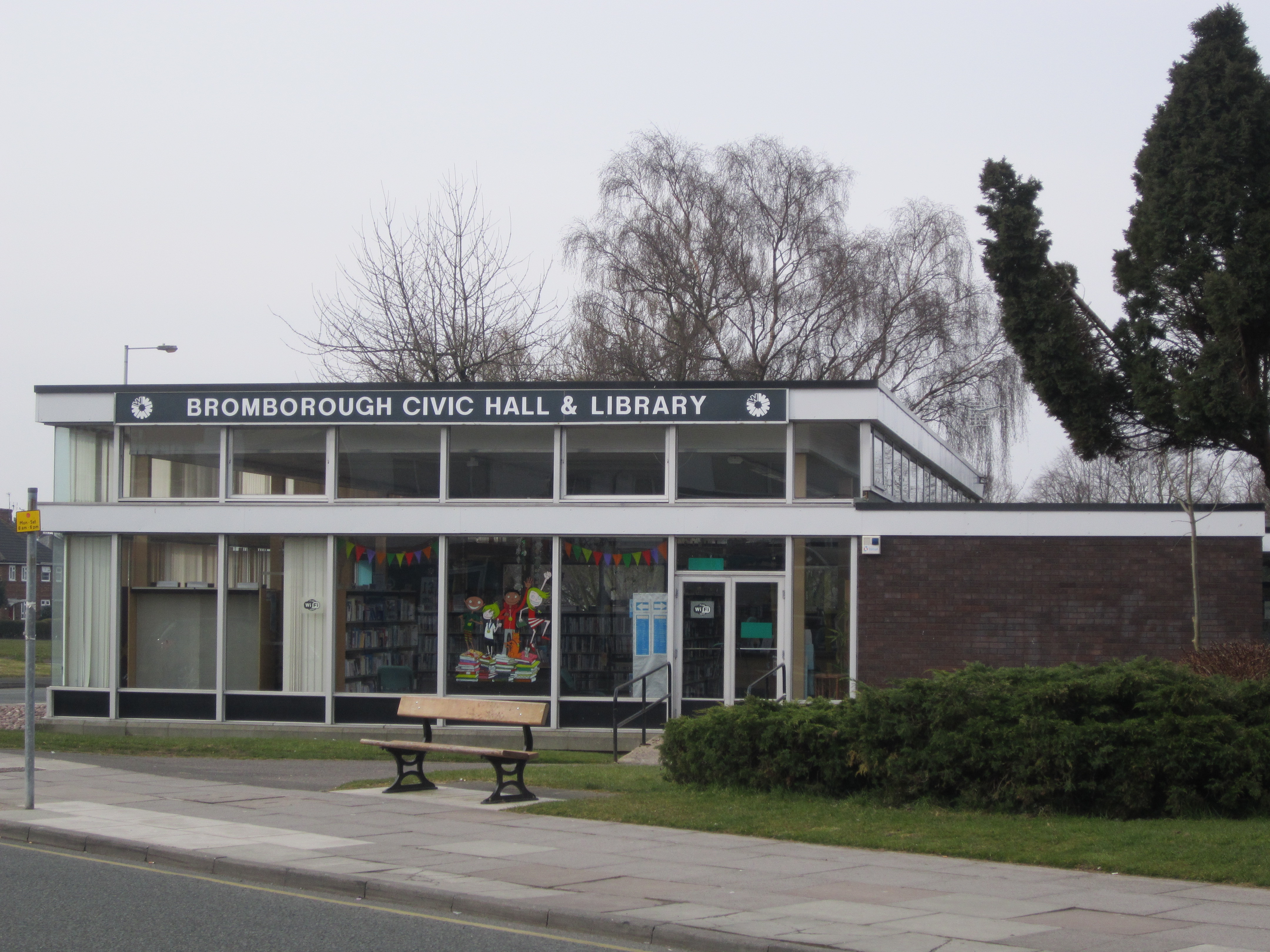
Bromborough Civic Hall & Library

To the west of the A41 New Chester Road, Bromborough is mainly residential development started in the 1930s, centred on the original village centre with its market cross.

There are a number of pubs in Bromborough: 'The Bromborough,' the 'Royal Oak' and the local British Legion, now known as the Bromborough Social Club are situated in Bromborough Village. 'The Archers' pub had closed down by 2013 and planning permission was submitted for it to be demolished. On the outskirts, bordering Eastham, are the 'Merebrook' and the 'Dibbinsdale', where there is a branch of the Pesto restaurant chain.

Bromborough's green spaces include Brotherton Park and Dibbinsdale Local Nature Reserve, along the banks of the River Dibbin, and Marfords Park to the south west of the town.

The local newspapers are the Bromborough and Bebington News and the Wirral Globe.

== Governance ==
There is one main tier of local government covering Bromborough, at metropolitan borough level: Wirral Council. The council is a member of the Liverpool City Region Combined Authority, which is led by the directly-elected Mayor of the Liverpool City Region.

The Bromborough ward is generally defined by Stanley Road in New Ferry to the north, the Mersey to the east, the railway line to the west and Acre Lane to the south. Bromborough is represented on Wirral Council by three Green councillors. The most recent local elections took place on 4 May 2023.

Bromborough is within the parliamentary constituency of Ellesmere Port and Bromborough, represented by Labour MP Justin Madders.

=== Administrative history ===
Bromborough was an ancient parish in the Wirral Hundred of Cheshire. The parish was subdivided into two townships, called Bromborough (which included the village itself) and Brimstage, which was detached from the main part of the parish, lying a couple of miles to the west. From the 17th century onwards, parishes were gradually given various civil functions under the poor laws, in addition to their original ecclesiastical functions. In some cases, including Bromborough, the civil functions were exercised by each township separately rather than the parish as a whole. In 1866, the legal definition of 'parish' was changed to be the areas used for administering the poor laws, and so each township became a separate civil parish.

In 1873, Bromborough was made a local government district, administered by an elected local board. Such districts were reconstituted as urban districts under the Local Government Act 1894. Bromborough Urban District was abolished in 1922, merging with the neighbouring urban districts of Higher Bebington and Lower Bebington to form the Bebington and Bromborough Urban District. In 1921, the last census before its abolition, the parish and urban district of Bromborough had a population of 2,652.

Bebington and Bromborough Urban District was renamed Bebington in 1933, when its territory was also significantly enlarged to take in Storeton, Poulton cum Spital, Brimstage, Thornton Hough, Raby, and Eastham. The urban district was raised to the status of a municipal borough in 1937. Bromborough remained part of the borough of Bebington until its abolition in 1974 under the Local Government Act 1972. The area then became part of the Metropolitan Borough of Wirral in the new county of Merseyside.

== Economy ==
East of the A41 road, towards the River Mersey, is industrial development and includes Bromborough Pool, an early industrial "model village" developed from 1853–58 by Price's Candles. Part of the industry is connected to the former Bromborough Dock and includes an ammonium nitrate warehouse and the main landfill site for the Wirral, now a walkway with views of the river. Cereal Partners employs 340 people and produces Cheerios and Corn Flakes, among other breakfast cereals, in a factory formerly owned by Viota. Rank Hovis McDougall briefly owned the business in the 1990s. Another major business is Sun Valley Snacks Ltd, which processes peanuts.

The Croft Retail & Leisure Park, which opened in March 1990, is located off the A41.

== Transport ==
=== Road ===
The main road through the area is the A41 New Chester Road. The B5137 Spital Road joins the A41 at Bromborough. Junctions 4 and 5 of the M53 motorway are equidistant from Bromborough, each about 3 km (1.9 mi) away; Junction 4 is to the west and Junction 5 is to the south.

=== Bus ===
There are many local bus services which serve the village, mostly operated by Stagecoach Merseyside. Stagecoach Gold service 1 offers direct, premium connections to Liverpool and Birkenhead to the north; Chester, Chester Zoo and Ellesmere Port to the south.

=== Rail ===
Bromborough and Bromborough Rake railway stations are both situated on the Wirral line of the Merseyrail network. Trains run every 15 minutes to Chester, every 30 minutes to Ellesmere Port, and there are six trains per hour to Liverpool Central.

== See also ==
- Listed buildings in Bromborough
- Listed buildings in Bromborough Pool
- Bromborough power stations

== Bibliography ==
- Mortimer, William Williams (1847). The History of the Hundred of Wirral. London: Whittaker & Co. pp207-213.
