= Listed buildings in Bromborough =

Bromborough is a village in Wirral, Merseyside, England. It contains eleven buildings that are recorded in the National Heritage List for England as designated listed buildings. Of these, two are listed at Grade II*, the middle of the three grades, and the others are at Grade II, the lowest grade. The listed buildings include houses, a church and associated structures, a school, a churchyard cross and a market cross, and a mile stone.

== Key ==
Grade	Criteria
II*	Particularly important buildings of more than special interest
II	Buildings of national importance and special interest

== Buildings ==
Name and location	Photograph	Date	Notes	Grade
Churchyard cross 53.33280°N 2.97887°W		9th or 10th century	The cross is in the churchyard of St Barnabas' Church. It was assembled from three stone fragments in 1958. Two fragments with interlace decoration form the shaft, and this carries half of a cross head in Celtic style. An additional stone at the base contains a plaque relating to its erection.	II
Market Cross; 53.33213°N 2.97768°W		1278 or later	The lower part of the cross is medieval, and the upper part, designed by George Gilbert Scott was added in 1874. An octagonal base stands on seven square steps. On the base is a chamfered shaft surmounted by a cap. The cap consists of a canopy carried on quatrefoil piers with corbels in the form of angels, and with crocketed gables. On the top is an octagonal plinth carrying a cross.	II*
Wall, Stanhope House; 53.33431°N 2.97787°W		Medieval (probable)	The stone wall is about 47 metres (154 ft) long. It extends along Mark Rake and turns into Spital Road, with a recessed quadrant on the corner. The section in Spital Road incorporates a stone arch containing a gate.	II
54, 56 and 56A Bromborough Village Road; 53.33253°N 2.97756°W		1685	Two shops and a flat, roughcast with concrete tiled roofs, in two storeys and attics, and with a four-bay front. In the ground floor are modern shop fronts. The middle floor contains sash windows, and in the attic are gabled dormers containing mullioned windows. There is a datestone inscribed with initials and the date. At the rear is an outshut and a wing.	II
Stanhope House; 53.33426°N 2.97844°W		1693	A stone house with a slate roof, later used as offices. It has three storeys, a front of three bays, and a low extension at the rear. The windows are mullioned, and those in the middle floor also have transoms. Above the porch is a stone inscribed with the date, initials, and the royal arms. At the top of the building are three dormers with bull's eye windows and obelisk finials.	II
Pear Tree Cottage; 53.33185°N 2.97950°W		1699	A stone house with a slate roof, it has two storeys, two bays, and a two-bay wing at the rear. The windows in the main range are mullioned, and in the rear wing they are casements. On the front is a datestone, and above the doorway is a large lintel and a canopy.	II
Sundial; 53.33305°N 2.97898°W		1730	The sundial is in the churchyard of St Barnabas' Church. It was possibly constructed from a 15th-century cross, and consists of two square steps on a base, a tapered shaft and a square cap. It is inscribed with the names of the churchwardens and the date.	II
Mile stone 53.33422°N 2.97774°W		Early 19th century (possible)	The mile stone is inscribed with the distance to Chester in miles. It also contains a benchmark and the name "BROMBORO", which is partly obscured.	II
Kinders; 53.32052°N 2.99053°W		Mid 19th century	A large detached stuccoed villa with a hipped slate roof in Italianate style, later used as offices. It has two storeys with attics, a three-bay front, and two single-storey ranges at the rear. In the centre is a projecting porch with pairs of Ionic columns and a balustrade. The windows are sashes. The exterior and interior have been little altered.	II
St Barnabas' Church; 53.33287°N 2.97880°W		1862–64	The church, which replaced an earlier church on the site, was designed by George Gilbert Scott in Early English style. The steeple was added in 1880. The church is in stone with a slate roof, and consists of a nave with a clerestory, aisles, a chancel with a semicircular apse, a south vestry, and a northeast tower with a broach spire. The windows contain Geometrical tracery.	II*
School and master's house 53.33219°N 2.97859°W		1868	The former school, later used as a community centre, and the house are in stone with slate roofs. The school has a single storey, a front of four bays, the first bay extending back for five bays. The first bay also projects forward and has a gable with a bellcote. The house has two storeys and two bays. The right bay projects forward with a gable, and the left bay contains a canopy and a gabled half-dormer.	II
