= St Barnabas' Church, Bromborough =

Coordinates: 53.3329°N 2.9788°W

St Barnabas's Church, Bromborough
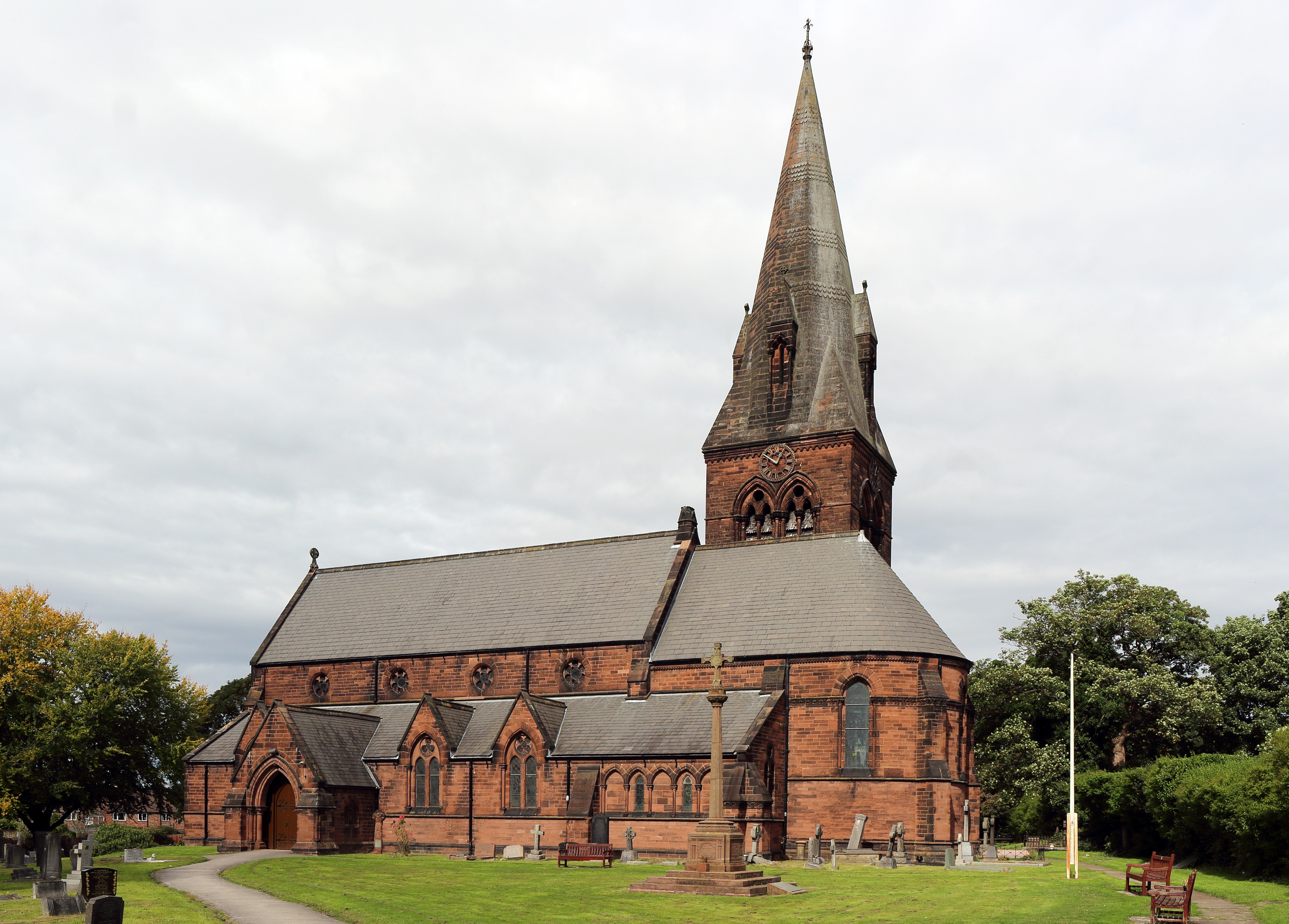
- St Barnabas' Church, Bromborough, from the southeast

- Location in Merseyside
- OS grid reference: SJ 349 823
- Location: Bromborough, Wirral, Merseyside
- Country: England
- Denomination: Anglican
- Website: St Barnabas, Bromborough

History
- Status: Parish church
- Dedication: Saint Barnabas
- Dedicated: 27 October 1864

Architecture
- Functional status: Active
- Heritage designation: Grade II*
- Designated: 27 December 1962
- Architect: Sir George Gilbert Scott
- Architectural type: Church
- Style: Gothic Revival
- Completed: 1864

Specifications
- Materials: Stone with slate roof

Administration
- Province: York
- Diocese: Chester
- Archdeaconry: Chester
- Deanery: Wirral South
- Parish: Bromborough

Clergy
- Rector: Revd Jenny Gillies

St Barnabas' Church is in the town of Bromborough, Wirral, Merseyside, England. The church is recorded in the National Heritage List for England as a designated Grade II* listed building, and stands within the boundary of the Bromborough Village Conservation Area. It is an active Anglican parish church in the diocese of Chester, the archdeaconry of Chester and the deanery of Wirral South. The authors of the Buildings of England series describe it a "handsome church for a village-gone-prosperous". It is considered to be a well-designed example of the work of Sir George Gilbert Scott. In the churchyard are three Anglo-Saxon carved stones which have been reconstructed to form a cross.

== History ==
The first church on the site was built in 928 adjacent to a monastery which had been founded in 912, probably by Ethelfleda. This church was demolished in 1828 and replaced on the same site by another church. This church was again replaced by the present church. It was built on a big scale between 1862 and 1864 to serve the residents of new large houses which had recently been built in the town. The architect was Sir George Gilbert Scott.

== Architecture ==
=== Exterior ===
The church is built from local red Triassic sandstone with a slate roof. Its plan consists of a nave with clerestory, north and south aisles under lean-to roofs, a chancel with a semicircular apse, a south vestry and a northeast tower with a broach spire. It is built in Early English style.

=== Interior ===
The sanctuary contains trefoil blind arcading. The reredos is a sculpted relief depicting The Last Supper. The font and pulpit are octagonal. The wooden screens and stalls are dated 1900. Most of the stained glass is by Clayton and Bell. The east window is by Ballantyne and Son. The three-manual organ was built around 1923 by Rushworth and Dreaper of Liverpool. There is a ring of eight bells, which are all dated 1880 by John Taylor and Company.

== External features ==
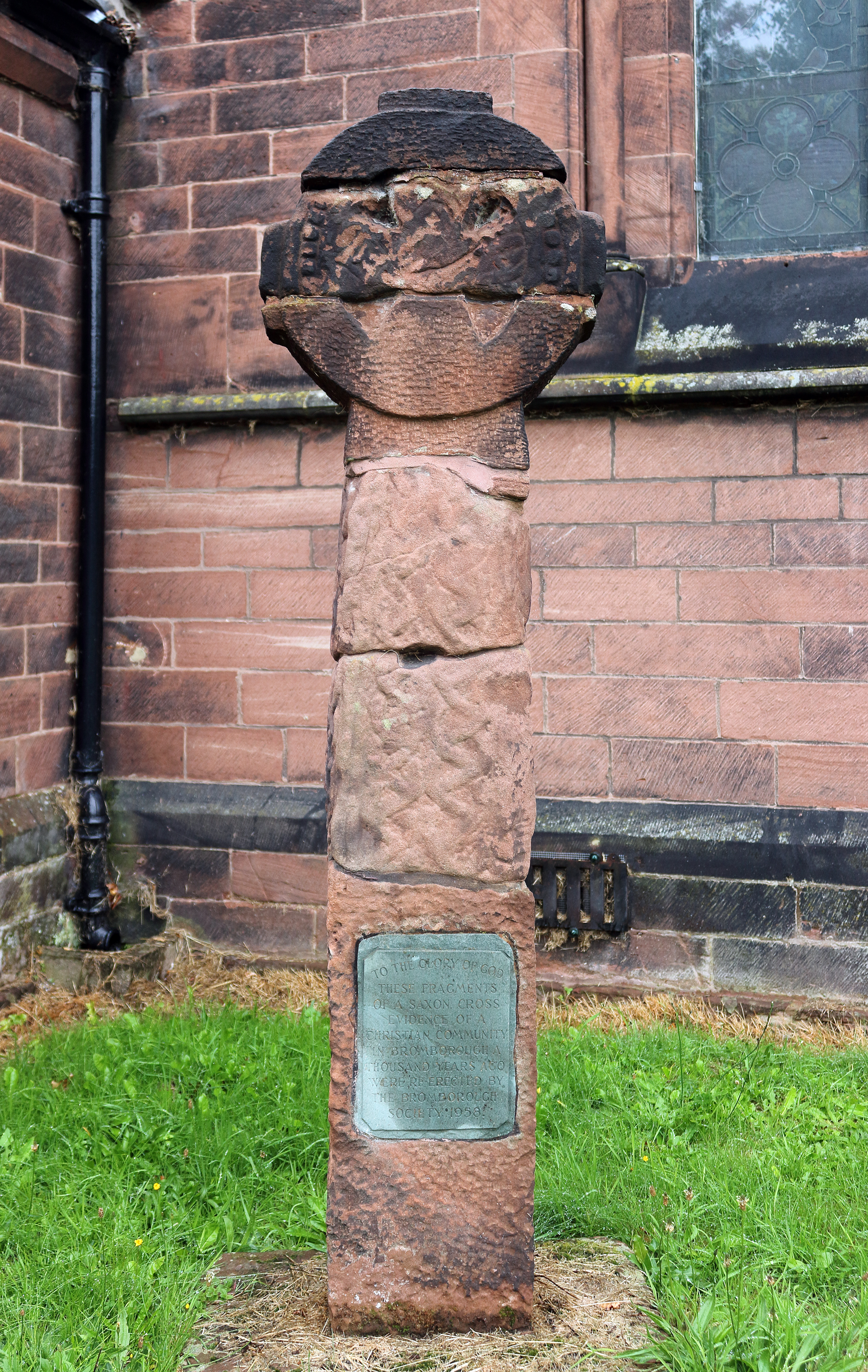
Cross

In the churchyard are three stone fragments dating possibly from the 10th century which have been re-erected in the form of a Celtic cross. The re-erection was carried out in 1958 by the Bromborough Society. It is listed at Grade II.

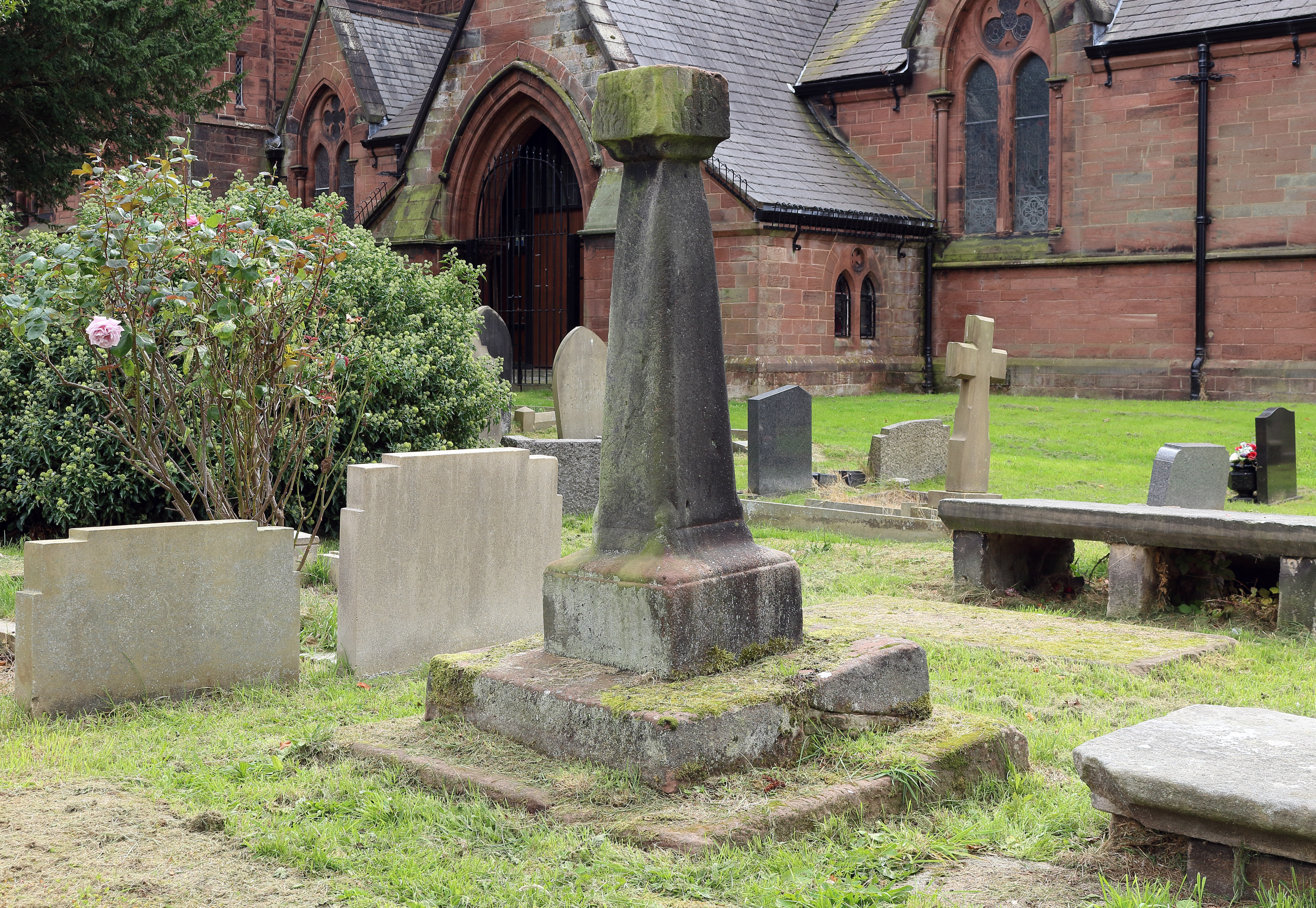
Sundial

Also in the churchyard and listed at Grade II is a stone sundial dated 1730 which is possibly constructed from a 15th-century cross. It consists of two square steps on a base, a tapered shaft and a square cap.

There are four war graves of service personnel, one of World War I and four of World War II.

== See also ==
- Grade II* listed buildings in Merseyside
- List of new churches by George Gilbert Scott in Northern England
- Listed buildings in Bromborough
