= Crewe Arms Hotel =

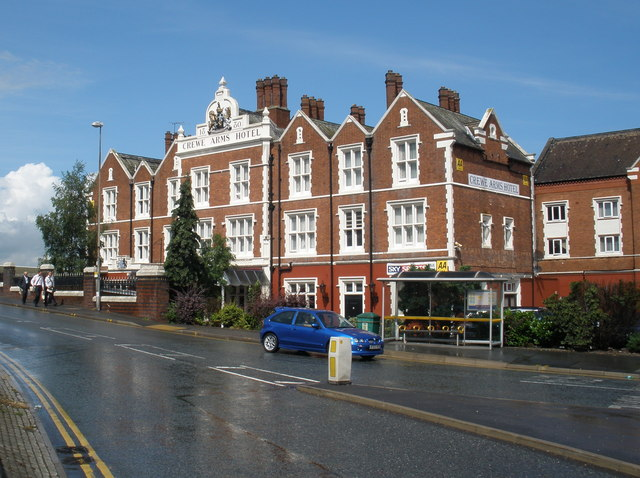
- Crewe Arms Hotel

- Location within Cheshire

General information
- Location: Crewe, Cheshire, United Kingdom
- Coordinates: 53.0902°N 2.4328°W
- Completed: 1837

The Crewe Arms Hotel is a leisure facility in Nantwich Road, Crewe, Cheshire, next to Crewe railway station. It was for nearly 70 years the meeting place of Cheshire County Council.

== History ==
The hotel was originally built as the station hotel for the Grand Junction Railway in 1837 and passed into the ownership of the London and North Western Railway on its formation in 1846. After Prince Albert acquired an interest in Balmoral Castle in 1848, Queen Victoria became a regular visitor to the Crewe Arms Hotel when she stayed overnight on her journey to her summer holidays in Scotland. An underground tunnel was built to enable her to move freely and in privacy to and from the station which was to the immediate west of the hotel.

The hotel was substantially rebuilt in 1880 to a design which involved a symmetrical main frontage with eight bays facing onto Nantwich Road; the central section of two bays, which slightly projected forward, featured an entrance on the ground floor, two windows on each of the first floor and second floor and a large and distinctive entablature supporting the coat of arms of the Barons Crewe at roof level.

Following the implementation of the Local Government Act 1888, which established county councils in every county, the hotel became a convenient meeting place for Cheshire County Council and it continued to host council meetings until County Hall on Castle Drive in Chester was completed in 1957.

The hotel then came into the ownership of the London, Midland and Scottish Railway in 1922. Following nationalisation of the railways it became part of the portfolio of the British Transport Hotels in January 1948. It was acquired by Embassy Hotels in 1969 and, after a period of ownership by Jarvis Hotels, it was bought by Grant Moon, a catering entrepreneur. It changed hands again, passing into the ownership of Harpreet Singh in 2008 and of Silverton Global in 2013: Silverton Global subsequently re-branded it as a Best Western Hotel.
