= Bromborough power stations =

Three former electricity generating stations

Bromborough power station
- Country: United Kingdom
- Location: Bromborough, Merseyside
- Coordinates: 53°20′04″N 02°57′44″W
- Status: Decommissioned and demolished
- Construction began: 1948
- Commission date: December 1951
- Decommission date: 1980
- Owners: British Electricity Authority (1948–1955); Central Electricity Authority (1955–57); Central Electricity Generating Board (1958–1980)
- Operator: As owner

Thermal power station
- Primary fuel: Fuel oil
- Turbine technology: Steam turbines
- Chimneys: 2 (250 feet, 76.2 m)
- Cooling source: Tidal river water

Power generation
- Units operational: 4 × 52.5 MW turbo-alternators
- Make and model: English Electric
- Units decommissioned: All
- Nameplate capacity: 210 MW
- Annual net output: 1504.234 GWh (1961)

Bromborough power stations are three electricity generating stations that supplied power to industrial and domestic users in Bromborough, Port Sunlight and the wider Wirral area from 1918 until 1998. Bromborough power station provided public electricity supplies from 1951 to 1980. Central power station Bromborough (1918–1998) was originally owned by Lever Brothers and supplied electricity to domestic users in Port Sunlight as well as electricity and steam to industrial users. Merseyside power station Bromborough (1958–1998) was also owned by Unilever and provided electricity and steam at a range of pressures to industrial users in the locality. All three power stations at Bromborough have been demolished.

== Bromborough power station ==
Bromborough power station was built as a 210 MW coal-fired station by the British Electricity Authority. Construction started in 1948 on a site (53°20′04.2″N 2°57′44.5″W) adjacent to the River Mersey.The consulting engineers for the scheme were Sir Alexander Gibb & Partners.

The plant at Bromborough comprised:

- 8 × Babcock & Wilcox coal-fired boilers each with an evaporative capacity of 300,000 lb/hr at 950 psi and 925 °F (37.8 kg/s at 65.5 bar and 496 °C).
- 4 × English Electric 52.5 MW turbo-alternators, with hydrogen cooled alternators generating electricity at 11 kV.

The first machine was commissioned in November 1951, followed by the other sets in December 1951, October 1952, and December 1952.

Condenser cooling water was abstracted from, and returned to, the tidal River Mersey.

Soon after commissioning the boilers were converted to oil-firing in accordance with government policy to take advantage of differential prices between coal and oil as fuel sources.

Bromborough power station was subsequently owned and operated by the Central Electricity Authority (1955–57) and the Central Electricity Generating Board (1958–80) as the UK electricity supply industry was restructured.

Operating data for the station throughout its operational life is shown in the table.

Bromborough power station operating data
Year	Capacity, MW	Electricity output, GWh	Hours run or (load factor %)	Thermal efficiency %
1954	188	1167.545	8760	29.20
1955	188	1354.139	8760	29.15
1956	197	1281.092	8784	28.92
1957	197	1245.667	8760	28.34
1958	197	1098.014	8760	28.14
1961	196	1504.234	(87.6 %)	28.94
1962	196	1386.124	(80.7 %)	29.50
1963	197	1412.953	(82.3 %)	29.97
1967	197	1124.955	(65.2 %)	28.12
1972	197	1436.221	(83.0 %)	29.22
1979	197	182.985	(10.6 %)	22.79

The station had a high thermal efficiency and was used intensively from the time it was commissioned. As an oil-fired station its utilisation was reduced following the oil crisis of 1973-4 when oil prices increased significantly.

Bromborough power station was closed in 1980 and was demolished in 1986.

== Central Power Station ==
Central power station (53°20′29.5″N 2°57′51.7″W) was built by Lever Brothers in 1918 to supply electricity for their manufacturing processes at Port Sunlight works. It initially comprised:

- 3 × coal-fired boilers
- 1 × Siemens Brothers 5 MW generating set.

The station was adjacent to the River Mersey which provided water for the condensing plant. In 1929 electricity was installed in the houses of Port Sunlight Village.

In the early 1930 the Central Power Station was expanded with three coal-fired boilers and a 6.25 MW generating set. The station then had a rated capacity of 11.5 MW.

In the 1950s a connection to the National Grid was installed. When local demand was high electricity could be imported from the grid, and conversely could be fed into the grid when local demand was low.

Some of the Unilever manufacturing processes required steam. A 1.3 MW British Thomson-Houston back-pressure generator was installed at the Central Station. This comprised a steam turbine fed with steam at 230 psi (15.9 bar) from the existing boilers. The expanding steam drove an alternator and discharged steam at 50 psi (3.4 bar), which was used in the works processes.

In the 1970s the oldest three boilers were decommissioned and part of the boiler house was demolished. The generating plant was decommissioned in 1998 and most of the site was demolished, the 11 kV control room block was retained until new electricity supplies from the National Grid were installed.

== Merseyside power station ==
To help meet increased demand for electricity and steam Unilever Group built an oil-fired power station (53°20'42.9"N 2°58'33.0"W) on Thermal Road industrial estate Bromborough which was commissioned in 1958.

The station comprised:

- 4 × oil-fired boilers producing 45 tons/h (45 tonnes/h) of steam at 650 psi (44.8 bar) and 450 °C, steam was fed to:
- 2 × 5 MW generating sets, after expansion in the turbine steam was discharged at 230 psi (15.9 bar) and supplied to the manufacturing plant and also to:
- 2 × 2.5 MW generating sets, steam was discharged at 110 psi (7.6 bar) and was supplied to the manufacturing plant.

The total electricity output was 14 MW and the station was designed to generate 80 GWh of electricity for the company's high voltage network. It supplied steam to 15 local companies and electricity to nearly 50 firms. The overall thermal efficiency of the station was about 78 per cent. The station had three slender concrete chimneys.

Oil was supplied to the station by a 4-inch diameter pipeline from Ellesmere Port. The power station used 100,000 tonnes of fuel oil a year.

The station cost £2.5 million to build and in 1958 was the largest privately owned power station in the UK. It had two 250 feet (76.2 m) high chimneys.

In 1964 work started on expanding Merseyside Power Station to meet growing demand. The new plant comprised:

- 1 × 104 tons/h boiler delivering steam at 1,500 psi (103.4 bar) and 538 °C,
- 1 × Associated Electrical Industries (AEI) 5.4 MW turbo-alternator generating at 11kV. This set was supplied with steam at 1,500 psi and discharged steam at 650 psi (44.3 bar).
- 1 × 8.1 MW turbo-alternator generating at 11 kV. This set took steam at 44.3 bar and reduced the steam pressure to 110 psi (7.59 bar).

By 1966 the Unilever network had a total generating capacity of nearly 30 MW and provided steam at 50, 110, 230 and 1,500 psi (3.4, 7.6, 15.9 and 103 bar).

In 1974, a further extension to Merseyside Power Station was undertaken and comprised a single high pressure boiler (rated at 104 tons/h), and two back pressure generating sets (5.8 MW) operating at 102/45 bar.

The specification and condition of the boilers and turbines in the last few years of operation were as follows.

Merseyside power station - boilers
Boiler Number	Capacity	Fuel	Steam pressure, psi	Notes	Condition c. 1990
1		Heavy fuel oil (HFO)	650		
2		HFO	650		
3		HFO	650		Scrap
4		HFO	650		Scrap
5	100 tons/h	HFO	1500	4 burners, 8 gallons/minute, Bailey DCS controls	Never used
6	100 tons/h	HFO	1500	4 burners, 8 gallons/minute, pneumatic Bailey Miniline500 controllers	Standby
7	100 tons/h	Coal	1500	Bailey DCS controls	Daily use

Merseyside power station - turbines
Turbine Number	Rating	Steam in, psi	Steam out, psi	Notes	Condition c. 1990
P1		650	230		Removed
P2		650	230		Removed
P3		650	230		Removed
S1		230	110		Removed
S2		230	110		Removed
T1					
T2	10 MW	1500	650	11 kV	Unserviceable
T3	14 MW	1500	110	Extract at 230 psi, 11 kV	Daily use

The requirement for steam was reduced by new manufacturing processes and the aging generating plant was decommissioned in 1998. Merseyside Power Station was subsequently demolished.
