= Spittal, Pembrokeshire =

Village, parish and community in Pembrokeshire, Wales

Spittal
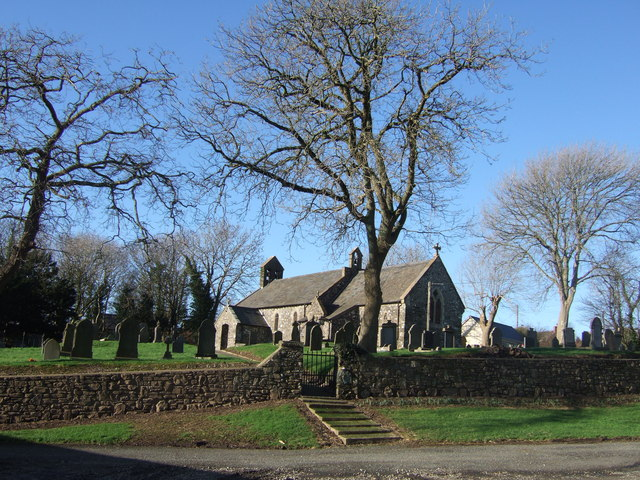
- St Mary's church, Spittal (2007)

- Location within Pembrokeshire
- Population: 494 (2011 census)
- OS grid reference: SM976230
- Community: Spittal
- Principal area: Pembrokeshire
- Preserved county: Dyfed
- Country: Wales
- Sovereign state: United Kingdom
- Post town: HAVERFORDWEST
- Postcode district: SA62
- Dialling code: 01437 741 ...
- Police: Dyfed-Powys
- Fire: Mid and West Wales
- Ambulance: Welsh
- UK Parliament: Preseli Pembrokeshire
- Senedd Cymru – Welsh Parliament: Ceredigion Penfro
- List of places UK Wales Pembrokeshire 51.869°N 4.941°W Map of the community

Spittal is a village, parish and community in Pembrokeshire, Wales. It is situated on the A40 trunk road, approximately halfway between Haverfordwest and Fishguard. It had a population of 494 as of the 2011 census.

== Name ==
The village's name is a corruption of the word 'hospital' (Welsh: Ysbyty), which is also the root of place names such as Spitalfields, London, Spital, Merseyside and Spital-in-the-Street, Lincolnshire. The village possessed a hospitium (place of accommodation for pilgrims) belonging to the Cathedral of St Davids. No trace of this remains.

== History ==
The parish was in the Hundred of Dungleddy, and in the early 19th century had a population of 452, including a number of smaller settlements. There are the remains of several ancient encampments in the parish.

== Amenities ==
Amenities include a community hall, a village green and a pub, the Pump on the Green.

The parish church of St Mary is a Grade II listed building of mediaeval origins, restored in the 19th century. The font is 12th or 13th century.

In 2004 a new primary school was built in the village to educate approximately 150 pupils from the village and surrounding area.
