= County Hall, Chester =

County building in Chester, Cheshire, England

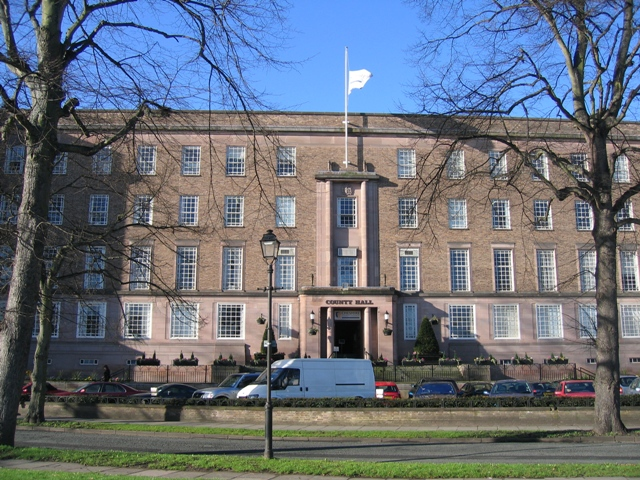
- County Hall

- Location within Cheshire

General information
- Architectural style: Neo-Georgian style
- Location: Chester, Cheshire, United Kingdom
- Coordinates: 53.1857°N 2.8912°W
- Completed: 1957

Design and construction
- Architect: E. Mainwaring Parkes

County Hall is a former municipal building on Castle Drive in Chester, Cheshire, England. It was the headquarters of Cheshire County Council and is now the Wheeler building campus of the University of Chester.

== History ==
Originally Cheshire County Council held its meetings at the Crewe Arms Hotel, conveniently located near to Crewe station in Crewe. After deciding that this arrangement was inadequate for their needs in the context of the increasing responsibilities of county councils, county leaders chose to procure a new county headquarters. The site selected – immediately to the south east of the old shire hall on the north bank of the River Dee – had previously been occupied by a late 18th century prison designed by Thomas Harrison, which had been demolished in 1902.

The new building was designed by E. Mainwaring Parkes, the County Architect, in the Neo-Georgian style. Construction started in 1938 but the Second World War caused delays, and the new county hall was only officially opened by Queen Elizabeth II on 11 July 1957. The principal room was the council chamber.

Following the abolition of the County Council in March 2009, the new unitary authority, Cheshire West and Chester Council chose to occupy a modern building on the site of a former police headquarters and overlooking the Chester Racecourse. County Hall became surplus to requirements and was sold to the University of Chester for £10.3 million. It was then converted for educational use as the university's Wheeler Building, named after the university's first vice-chancellor, Tim Wheeler, so that it could accommodate the university's Faculties of Health and Social Care and Education and Children's Services. The council chamber was converted into a large lecture theatre.

== Description ==
The design has a symmetrical main frontage with seventeen bays facing onto Castle Drive with the end bays projecting forwards. The central section features a portico on the ground floor containing a doorway flanked by columns; there is a window on the first floor and another on the second floor again flanked by columns which support an entablature with two finials above. Pevsner's verdict was that the building was "not an ornament to the riverside view".
