= Wesley Emberton =

English politician (1896–1967)

Lieutenant-Colonel Alderman Sir John Wesley Emberton JP DL (3 February 1896 – 10 December 1967) was an English local politician and public servant.

== Biography ==
Born in 1896, he was the son of John Emberton, OBE, JP, of Nantwich, Cheshire.

John Emberton grew up in Greenfield, Hunsterson, where his father Thomas farmed. A staunch Methodist and active preacher, he had a successful career as a cheese factor and eventually as a farmer; he was also a distinguished local politician, serving as chairman on the Cheshire War Agricultural Committee during the First World War, as a Cheshire County Councillor from 1896 until 1932 (when he was elected an Alderman), and as Chairman of the Nantwich Magistrates from 1936 until his death in 1939.

Wesley Emberton attended Rydal School in Colwyn Bay, Wales, before serving in the First World War. He initially joined the Royal Welsh Fusiliers as a private, but was commissioned as a lieutenant and served overseas; he was injured in 1917 and returned home to convalesce, before being promoted to captain. Like his father, Emberton pursued a career in cheese production and distribution after the war and was the principal of a firm of cheese factors. When John Emberton was elevated to the Aldermanic bench in 1932, Wesley was returned for his old seat (the Willaston division) on Cheshire County Council.

In 1940, he was selected to the Conservative Party's Chief Whip on the council, and in 1952 he became the council's chairman, serving until his death. He had been appointed a justice of the peace in 1941, a deputy lieutenant for Cheshire in 1952, and an honorary freeman of Crewe in 1967; during the Second World War, he was commissioned into the 24th Battalion of the Cheshire Home Guard and in 1942 was promoted to lieutenant-colonel.

Lord Leverhulme (then Lord Lieutenant of Cheshire) wrote in an obituary for The Times that Emberton was "an eminent and outstanding figure in the public life of the county", adding that, as chairman on the County Council, he was interested in the welfare of the elderly, education and the provision of smallholdings. He was responsible for the Council leasing Tatton Park from the National Trust and opening it to the public.

Emberton was knighted in 1958 for "political and public services in Cheshire". With his wife Marion Major (whom he married in 1926), he had a daughter; the family lived at The Lymes, Audlem, near Crewe, where he died on 10 December 1967.

== Archives ==
- "Sir Wesley Emberton Papers", Cheshire Archives and Local Studies (reference no. DDX449; formerly part of Accession no. 2290). Deposited by Mrs E. Bradshaw, The Lymes, Audlem, in November 1976.

Other offices
Preceded by Sir Otho Glover	Chairman, Cheshire County Council; 1952–1967	Succeeded by Sir Herbert Dewes
