= Cheshire County Council =

Former local authority in England

History
- Founded: 1 April 1889; 136 years ago
- Disbanded: 31 March 2009; 16 years ago
- Succeeded by: Cheshire East Council; Cheshire West and Chester Council

Meeting place
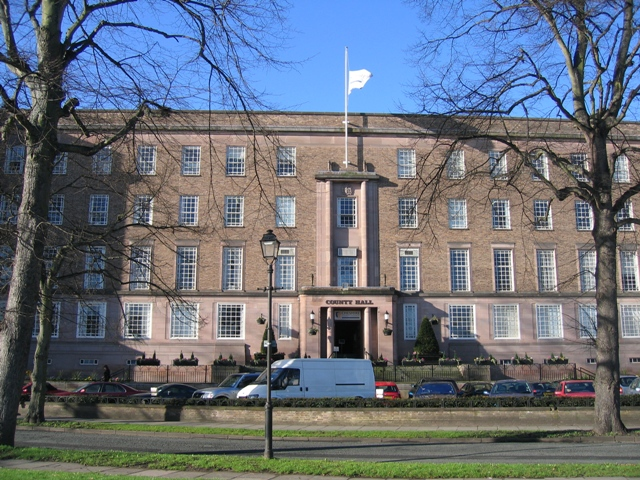
- County Hall, Castle Drive, Chester

Cheshire County Council was the county council of Cheshire. Founded on 1 April 1889, it was officially dissolved on 31 March 2009, when it and its districts were superseded by two unitary authorities: Cheshire West and Chester and Cheshire East. The county council provided county-level services, and there was also a lower tier of district councils, which was reformed on a number of occasions. From 1998 until the county council's abolition in 2009 there were six districts subordinate to the county council: Chester, Congleton, Crewe and Nantwich, Ellesmere Port and Neston, Macclesfield, and Vale Royal.

== History ==
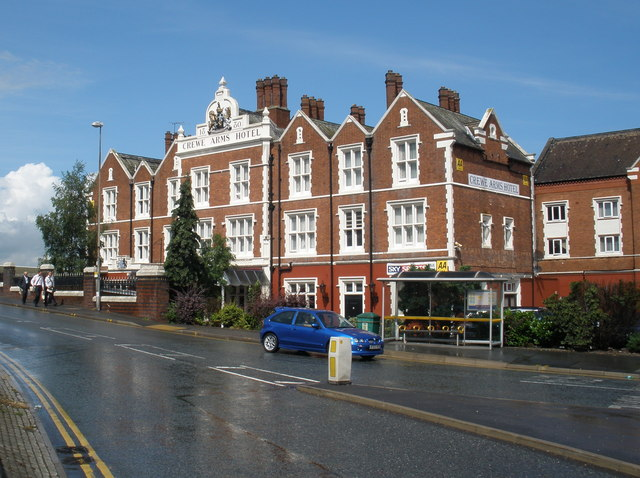
Crewe Arms Hotel: Council's usual meeting place until 1957

Cheshire County Council was created on 1 April 1889 under the Local Government Act 1888, which established elected county councils across England and Wales to take over the local government functions previously performed by unelected magistrates at the quarter sessions. Certain large towns were made county boroughs, administering their own affairs independently from the county councils. When Cheshire County Council was established in 1889, three county boroughs were created in Cheshire: Birkenhead, Chester, and Stockport. The area of the county excluding these towns was known as the administrative county and was the area under the jurisdiction of Cheshire County Council. Wallasey was later made a county borough in 1913, removing it from the administrative county. The first elections were held in January 1889 and the council formally came into being on 1 April 1889, on which day it held its first official meeting at Macclesfield Town Hall. There was a lengthy debate at that first meeting on where the council should hold its regular meetings, which concluded with a vote in favour of making Chester the regular meeting place. Despite that decision, the council subsequently used the Crewe Arms Hotel in Crewe for most meetings until 1957.

Comparison of districts within Cheshire, 1998-2009 (left), and from 2009 (right)
County council area Unitary

Under the Local Government Act 1972, Cheshire was reconstituted as a non-metropolitan county and had its boundaries revised, with an area in the north-east of the county (including Stockport) being transferred to Greater Manchester, the Wirral peninsula (including Birkenhead and Wallasey) being transferred to Merseyside and the eastern tip of the county at Upper Longdendale and Tintwistle being transferred to Derbyshire. In return, the county gained the area around Widnes and Warrington from Lancashire. County boroughs were abolished at the same time, and so the city of Chester came under the jurisdiction of the county council for the first time. The lower tier of local government was also reorganised, with the county's previous municipal boroughs, urban districts and rural districts being replaced by eight non-metropolitan districts. These changes all took effect on 1 April 1974.

On 1 April 1998, two of the county's districts, Halton and Warrington, became unitary authorities, making them independent from Cheshire County Council.

Cheshire County Council and its six remaining districts were abolished on 31 March 2009. From 1 April 2009 the area formed two unitary authorities, with Cheshire East covering the area of the former Congleton, Crewe and Nantwich and Macclesfield districts, and Cheshire West and Chester covering the area of the former Chester, Ellesmere Port and Neston, and Vale Royal districts.

== Premises ==
From 1889 until 1957 the county council met at the Crewe Arms Hotel in Crewe as a location conveniently accessible by railway to most of the county. Work began on building a new County Hall on Castle Drive in Chester in 1938, but work on the building was paused due to the Second World War, and it was not formally opened until 1957. After Cheshire County Council's abolition, County Hall was sold to the University of Chester.

== Political control ==
From 1889 until 1970, elections to the county council were generally held every three years. As part of the reforms under the Local Government Act 1972, those councillors still in post in 1972 on the old county council had their terms of office extended to 31 March 1974. The first election to the reconstituted county council was held in 1973, initially operating as a shadow authority until the new arrangements came into effect on 1 April 1974. Elections were thereafter generally held every four years for the county council. The last election to Cheshire County Council was held in 2005. Voting for the new unitary authorities took place on 1 May 2008, which then acted as shadow authorities until formally taking over from the abolished county and district councils on 1 April 2009. Political control of Cheshire County Council from 1974 until its abolition in 2009 was as follows:

Party in control	Years
No overall control	1974–1977
Conservative	1977–1981
No overall control	1981–2001
Conservative	2001–2009

=== Leadership ===
The chairmen of the county council from 1889 until the 1974 reforms were:

- 1889–1893: Duncan Graham.
- 1893–1922: Col. Sir George Dixon, 1st Baronet, JP, DL.
- 1922–1935: Sir William Hodgson, JP.
- 1935–1940: Maj. Thomas Clayton Toler.
- 1940–1944: Joseph Cooke.
- 1944–1948: Maj. Hewitt Pearson Montague Beames, CBE.
- 1948–1951: Sir Edward Otho Glover.
- 1952–1967: Lt-Col. Sir John Wesley Emberton.
- 1968–1974: Sir Herbert John Salisbury Dewes, CBE, JP, DL.

The leaders of the council from 1974 until 2009 were:

Councillor	Party	From	To
Bryan Harris	Conservative	1 Apr 1974	May 1979
Allan Richardson	Conservative	May 1979	May 1981
Basil Jeuda	Labour	May 1981	28 Oct 1982
Allan Richardson	Conservative	28 Oct 1982	27 Oct 1983
Ken Maynard	Conservative	27 Oct 1983	May 1984
Basil Jeuda	Labour	May 1984	May 1985
John Collins	Labour	May 1985	27 May 1993
Simon Cussons	Conservative	1993	May 1997
John Collins	Labour	May 1997	31 Mar 1998
Derek Bateman	Labour	1 Apr 1998	2001
Paul Findlow	Conservative	2001	31 Mar 2009

== Council elections ==
- 1973 Cheshire County Council election
- 1977 Cheshire County Council election
- 1981 Cheshire County Council election
- 1985 Cheshire County Council election
- 1989 Cheshire County Council election
- 1993 Cheshire County Council election
- 1997 Cheshire County Council election
- 2001 Cheshire County Council election
- 2005 Cheshire County Council election

=== Results maps ===
2005 results map

=== By-election results ===
Blacon ED By-Election 19 September 1996
Party	Candidate	Votes	%	±%
Labour		1,326	87.9	
Conservative		182	12.1	
Majority		1,144	75.8	
Turnout		1,508		
Labour hold		Swing		

Broxton By-Election 18 September 1997
Party	Candidate	Votes	%	±%
Liberal Democrats		1,266	53.3	+21.3
Conservative		1,110	46.7	−0.6
Majority		156	6.6	
Turnout		2,376	26.4	
Liberal Democrats gain from Conservative		Swing		

Congleton and Buglawton By-Election 18 March 1999
Party	Candidate	Votes	%	±%
Liberal Democrats		880	41.5	+17.1
Labour		821	38.7	+1.6
Conservative		419	19.8	−2.7
Majority		59	2.8	
Turnout		2,120	21.8	
Liberal Democrats gain from Labour		Swing		

Bucklow By-Election 29 July 1999
Party	Candidate	Votes	%	±%
Conservative		1,326	83.8	+22.0
Independent		137	8.7	+8.7
Liberal Democrats		120	7.6	−14.3
Majority		1,189	75.1	
Turnout		1,583	20.0	
Conservative hold		Swing		

Doddington By-Election 1 May 2003
Party	Candidate	Votes	%	±%
Conservative		2,137	67.9	
Labour		1,012	32.1	
Majority		1,125	35.8	
Turnout		3,149	31.0	
Conservative hold		Swing		

Crewe South By-Election 1 April 2004
Party	Candidate	Votes	%	±%
Liberal Democrats	David Cannon	1,393	43.3	+15.1
Labour		1,082	33.7	−22.1
BNP		385	12.0	+12.0
Conservative		355	11.0	+0.0
Majority		311	9.6	
Turnout		3,215	29.0	
Liberal Democrats gain from Labour		Swing		

Gowy By-Election 27 September 2007
Party	Candidate	Votes	%	±%
Conservative	Eleanor Johnson	1,863	50.4	+2.1
Liberal Democrats	Andrew Garman	1,419	38.4	+5.7
Labour	Mark Green	307	8.3	−10.8
UKIP	John Moore	107	2.9	+2.9
Majority		444	12.0	
Turnout		3,696	32.8	
Conservative hold		Swing		

Abbey By-Election 1 May 2008
Party	Candidate	Votes	%	±%
Conservative	Herbert Manley	2,213	63.2	+16.6
Liberal Democrats	Arthur Wood	857	24.5	−1.9
Labour	Mark Green	432	12.3	−9.1
Majority		1,356	38.7	
Turnout		3,502	35.5	
Conservative hold		Swing		

== Alderman ==
Below is a list of people who were Aldermen of Cheshire County Council and when they were made an alderman.

- Vernon(???) (Note: Full name is not proved by the source it just says "Ald Vernon" and says that he was a member of the "Cheshire Education Committee at Chester")
