= Brotherton Park and Dibbinsdale Local Nature Reserve =

Nature reserve in Wirral, Merseyside

Dibbinsdale
- Site of Special Scientific Interest
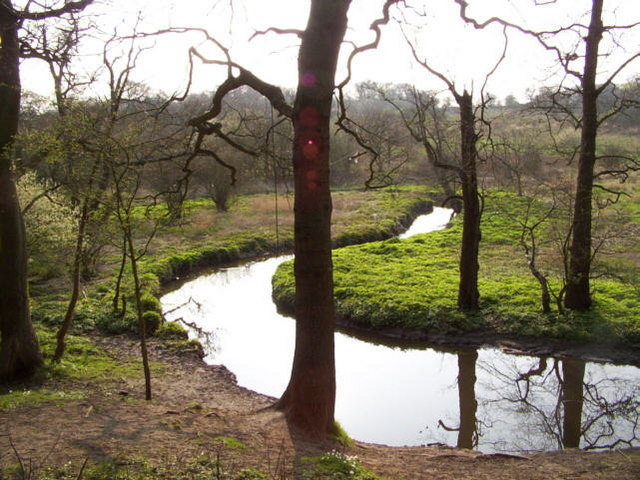

- Location within Merseyside
- Location of Dibbinsdale.
- Area of search: Merseyside
- Grid reference: SJ338815
- Coordinates: 53.331°N 2.995°W
- Interest: Biological
- Area: 53.2 ha (131 acres)
- Notification date: 1979 / 1983

Brotherton Park and Dibbinsdale Local Nature Reserve informally known as Dibbinsdale is a combined park and local nature reserve managed by the Metropolitan Borough of Wirral and located in Bromborough, Merseyside, England.

== History ==
Dibbinsdale takes its name from the River Dibbin which flows through the area. It is thought to have formed part of the boundary in the 10th and 11th centuries between the Norse colony in Wirral, to the north and west, and Anglo-Saxon Mercia to the east and south. After the Norman Conquest, the whole area became part of the Hundred of Wirral. In the 1800s the land on which Brotherton Park resides was part of an estate called 'Woodslee', this estate was bought in 1866 by a Liverpool Merchant called Robert Rankin who built 'Woodslee' house on the site as a wedding present for his daughter. The estate comprised Woodslee, servants cottages, a lake, stables, coach house, a walled garden and formal gardens with a rockery. At some stage it was sold William Johnston of Liverpool who is listed as living there in the 1901 Census. In 1919 the estate was bought by Lord Brotherton, an industrialist and member of parliament who donated the estate to the council in the 1930s, by the 1940s the house had become dilapidated and was demolished. In 1978 Brotherton Park and Dibbinsdale was designated a local nature reserve owing to the ancient woodland and became a single entity with much of Dibbinsdale donated by the Lancelyn Green family.

== Brotherton Park ==
Brotherton Park is an urban park with an informal grassed area for recreation, dog walking and picnicking.

== Dibbinsdale Local Nature Reserve ==
Dibbinsdale is a local nature reserve with a woodland valley which is an example of ancient woodland in the Merseyside area. It is also a Site of Special Scientific Interest.

== Facilities ==
The park has woodland walks, nature trails, a meadow, historic woodland, wetland habitats, a small unmanned visitor centre, a rangers office, toilets and a free car park.
