= St Matthew's Church, Bromborough Pool =

Coordinates: 53.3507°N 2.9788°W

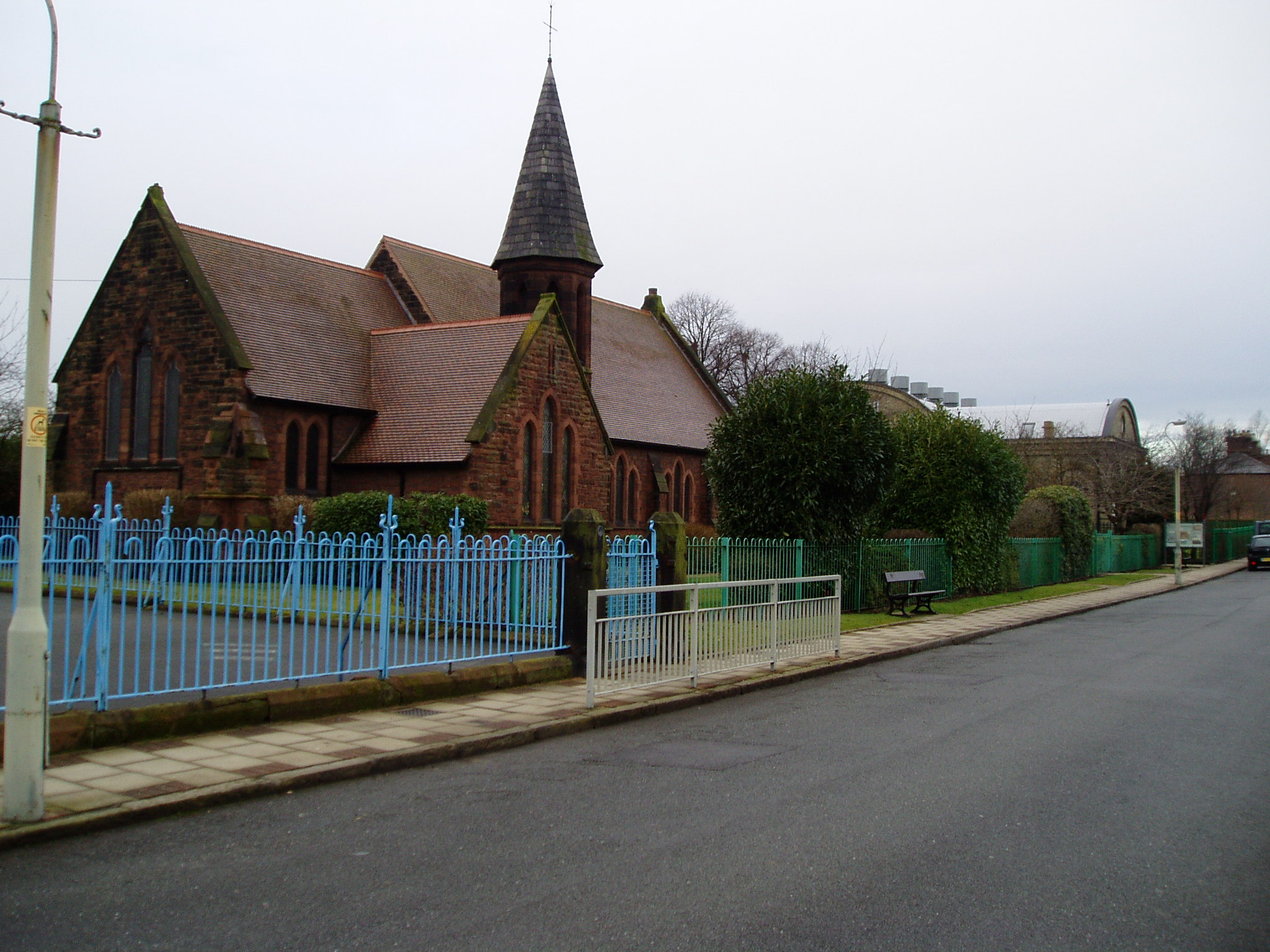
- St Matthew's Church, Bromborough Pool, from the northeast

- Location in Merseyside
- OS grid reference: SJ 349 842
- Location: York Street, Bromborough Pool, Wirral, Merseyside
- Country: England
- Denomination: Anglican
- Website: St Michael, Bromborough Pool

History
- Status: Chapel
- Dedication: Saint Matthew

Architecture
- Functional status: Closed
- Heritage designation: Grade II
- Designated: 2 December 1986
- Architect: Leach of London
- Architectural type: Church
- Style: Gothic Revival
- Groundbreaking: 1889
- Completed: 1890
- Closed: 2007

Specifications
- Materials: Stone, tiled roofs, slate spirelet

Administration
- Province: York
- Diocese: Chester
- Archdeaconry: Chester
- Deanery: Wirral, South
- Parish: Bromborough

St Matthew's Church is in York Street, Bromborough Pool, Wirral, Merseyside, England. It was originally a non-denominational chapel for the workers at the nearby candle factory, and later became an Anglican church, but it closed for worship in 2007. The church is recorded in the National Heritage List for England as a designated Grade II listed building.

== History ==
The church was built in 1889–90 and designed by Leach of London for the use of the workers of Price's Patent Candle Company. Bromborough Pool was an early model village created in 1853 by George and James Wilson, founders of the company. The church was originally a non-denominational chapel, and later became Anglican. It was a chapel in the benefice of St Barnabas, Bromborough, but closed for worship in 2007.

== Architecture ==
St Matthew's is constructed in rock-faced stone with ashlar dressings and a tiled roof. Its plan consists of a four-bay nave, a south porch, a three-bay chancel, a north transept, and a turret in the angle in the north corner of the nave and transept. The west window, the east window, the nave and transept windows are all triple lancets, and along the sides of the chancel are paired lancets. The turret is octagonal and has a pointed entrance, louvred bell openings, and a slate spirelet surmounted by an iron cross.

== Appraisal ==
The church was designated as a Grade II listed building on 2 December 1986. Grade II is the lowest of the three grades of listing and is applied to buildings that are "nationally important and of special interest".

== Present day and governance ==
Until its closure in 2007 the church was in the parish and benefice of Bromborough, the deanery of Wirral, South, the archdeaconry of Chester, and the diocese of Chester. Since it was closed, work has been carried out to make plans for its reopening for worship.

== See also ==
- Listed buildings in Bromborough Pool
