= Listed buildings in Bromborough Pool =

Bromborough Pool is a village in Wirral, Merseyside, England. It contains 17 buildings that are recorded in the National Heritage List for England as designated listed buildings, all of which are listed at Grade II. This grade is the lowest of the three gradings given to listed buildings and is applied to "buildings of national importance and special interest". Bromborough Pool is an early model village, built for the workers at the factory of Price's Patent Candle Company. All the listed buildings were constructed for the company; most of them are workers' houses, the others being an office building, the village hall, and the church.

Name and location	Photograph	Date	Notes
Unichema office building 53.35227°N 2.98478°W	Unichema Office Building, Bromborough Pool 3	1853	An industrial building in brick with stone dressings and a slate roof in Italianate style. It has three storeys, fronts of five and eight bays with later extensions, and a central tower. The fronts are gabled, and most of the windows are sashes. The tower contains round-headed windows and a clock face, and it has a pyramidal roof. Originally a candle factory, it has been converted into apartments.
10–16 York Street; 53.35162°N 2.98086°W		c. 1854	A terrace of four brick houses with a hipped slate roof. They have two storeys and an eight-bay front, and at the rear are gabled wings. Above the entrances are Tudor arched fanlights, and the windows are sashes.
18–24 York Street; 53.35145°N 2.98046°W	18_-_24_York_Street,_Bromborough_Pool	c. 1854	A terrace of four brick houses with a hipped slate roof. They have two storeys and an eight-bay front, and at the rear are gabled wings. Above the entrances are Tudor arched fanlights, and the windows are sashes.
26–32 York Street; 53.35129°N 2.98002°W		c. 1854	A terrace of four brick houses with a hipped slate roof. They have two storeys and an eight-bay front, and at the rear are gabled wings. Above the entrances are Tudor arched fanlights, and the windows are sashes.
1 and 2 The Green; 53.35117°N 2.97697°W	1_&_2_The_Green,_Bromborough_Pool	1850s	A pair of brick houses with stuccoed dressings and a hipped slate roof. They have two storeys and a two-bay front. The outer bays project forward, and contain canted bay windows with pilasters, a frieze and a cornice. At the top of the house is a parapet. The windows are sashes with architraves. On the sides of the house are porches with pilasters, entablatures, and round-headed entrances.
14–20 Manor Place; 53.35105°N 2.98148°W	14_-_20_Manor_Place,_Bromborough_Pool	c. 1856	A terrace of four brick houses with a hipped slate roof. They have two storeys and a six-bay front, and at the rear are lean-to wings. The outer bays project forward and contain a rectangular bay window with casements. The other windows are sashes. The doors have fanlights, and on the sides are 20th-century projections.
17–23 Manor Place; 53.35112°N 2.98110°W	17_-_23_Manor_Place,_Bromborough_Pool	c. 1856	A terrace of four brick houses with a hipped slate roof. They have two storeys and an eight-bay front, and at the rear is a continuous outshut. Above the entrances are Tudor arched fanlights, and there is a pair of doorways centrally on the front, the others being on the sides. The windows are sashes.
22–28 Manor Place; 53.35090°N 2.98104°W	22_-_28_Manor_Place,_Bromborough_Pool	c. 1856	A terrace of four brick houses with a hipped slate roof. They have two storeys and a six-bay front, and at the rear are lean-to wings. The outer bays project forward and contain a rectangular bay window with casements. The other windows are sashes. The doors have fanlights, and on the sides are 20th-century projections.
25–31 Manor Place; 53.35096°N 2.98068°W	25_-_31_Manor_Place,_Bromborough_Pool,_Bromborough_Pool_-_DSC03516	c. 1856	A terrace of four brick houses with a hipped slate roof. They have two storeys and an eight-bay front, and at the rear is a continuous outshut. Above the entrances are Tudor arched fanlights, and there is a pair of doorways centrally on the front, the others being on the sides. The windows are sashes.
46–52 Manor Place; 53.35046°N 2.97978°W	46_-_52_Manor_Place,_Bromborough_Pool	c. 1856	A terrace of four brick houses with a hipped slate roof. They have two storeys and a six-bay front, and at the rear are lean-to wings. The outer bays project forward and contain a rectangular bay window with casements. The other windows are sashes. The doors have fanlights, and on the sides are 20th-century projections.
Village Hall; 53.35097°N 2.97951°W		1858	The village hall was designed by Julian Hall, and was originally a school. It is in yellow brick with dressings in red brick and stone, and with a corrugated iron roof. The building is in a single storey, and has a nine-bay front, the middle three bays projecting forward by two bays and having a segmental gable containing a round window. On the front are round-headed arcades containing round-headed sash windows. The porch is in the seventh bay, and also has a segmental gable.
33–37 Manor Place; 53.35084°N 2.98034°W	33_-_37_Manor_Place,_Bromborough_Pool_2	c. 1872	A terrace of three brick houses with a hipped slate roof. They have two storeys and a six-bay front, and at the rear are lean-to wings. The doorways are round-headed, and the windows are sashes with segmental heads.
38–44 Manor Place; 53.35058°N 2.98015°W	38_-_44_Manor_Place,_Bromborough_Pool_1	c. 1872	A terrace of four brick houses with a hipped slate roof. They have two storeys and an eight-bay front, and at the rear are lean-to wings. The doorways are round-headed, and the windows are sashes with segmental heads.
39–45 Manor Place; 53.35071°N 2.98002°W	39_-_45_Manor_Place,_Bromborough_Pool_-_DSC03514	c. 1872	A terrace of three brick houses with a hipped slate roof. They have two storeys and a six-bay front, and at the rear are lean-to wings. The doorways are round-headed, and the windows are sashes with segmental heads.
47–53 Manor Place; 53.35058°N 2.97963°W	47_-_53_Manor_Place,_Bromborough_Pool	c. 1872	A terrace of four brick houses with a hipped slate roof. They have two storeys and an eight-bay front, and at the rear are lean-to wings. The doorways are round-headed, and the windows are sashes with segmental heads.
St Matthew's Church; 53.35072°N 2.97879°W		1889–90	The church was designed by Leach of London, and is in stone with a tiled roof. It consists of a nave, a chancel, and a north transept. In the angle between the nave and the transept is an octagonal turret with louvred bell openings, and a slate spirelet with an iron cross. The windows are lancets.
Primary school 53.35057°N 2.97824°W		1898	The school is built in stone with a tiled roof. It is in a single storey with an irregular plan, and has a front of five unequal bays, two of which are gabled. The windows are a mixture of sashes and casements, some of which are mullioned and/or transomed. The school has a tower on top of which is a recessed timber lantern with a pyramidal roof.
