= Model village =

Type of mostly self-contained community

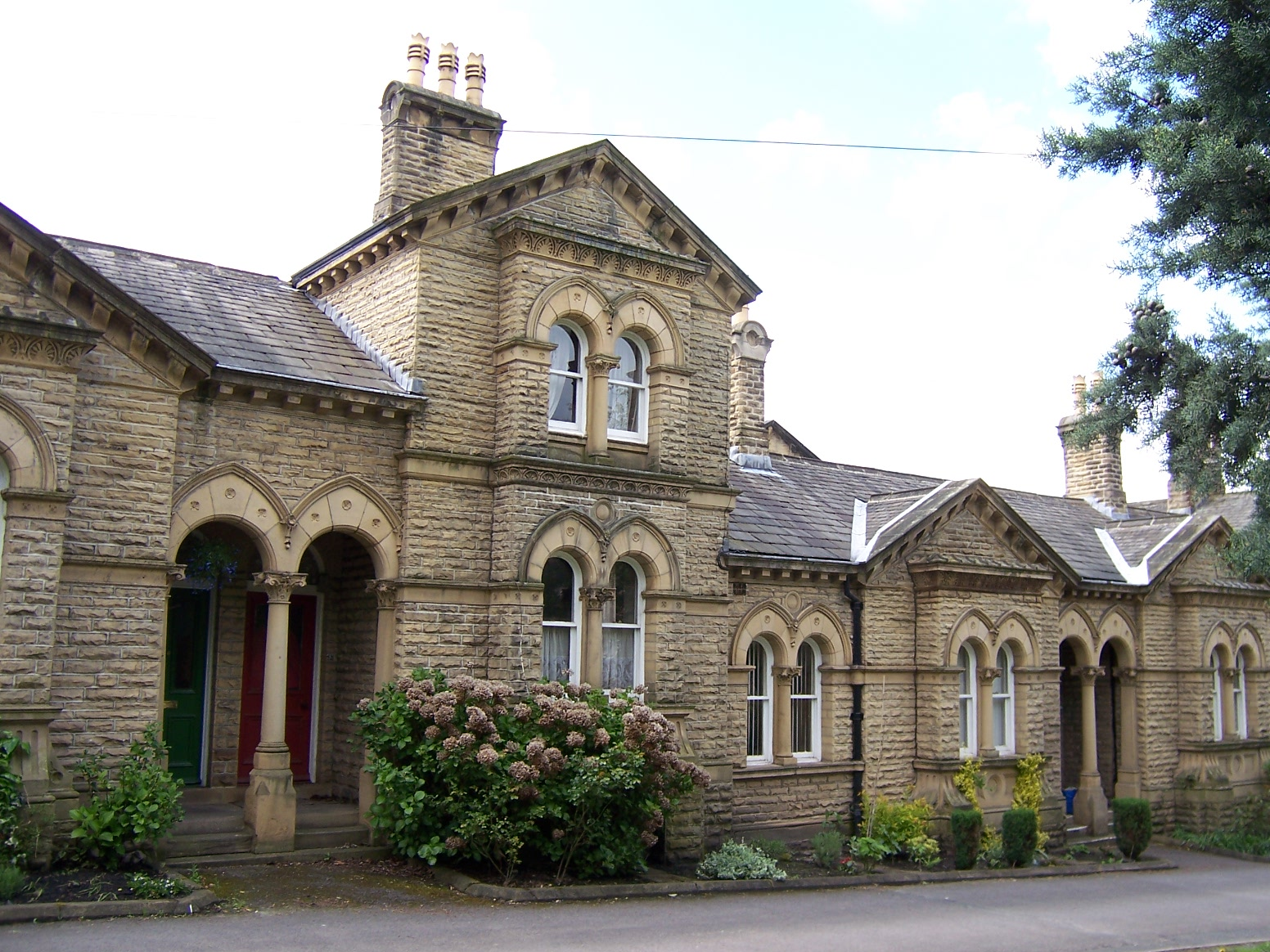
Almshouses in Saltaire, Yorkshire, typical of the architecture of the whole village

A model village is a mostly self-contained community, built from the late 18th century onwards by landowners and business magnates to house their workers. "Model" implies an ideal to which other developments could aspire. Although the villages are located close to the workplace, they are generally physically separated from them and often consist of relatively high-quality housing, with integrated community amenities and attractive physical environments.

== Great Britain and Ireland ==
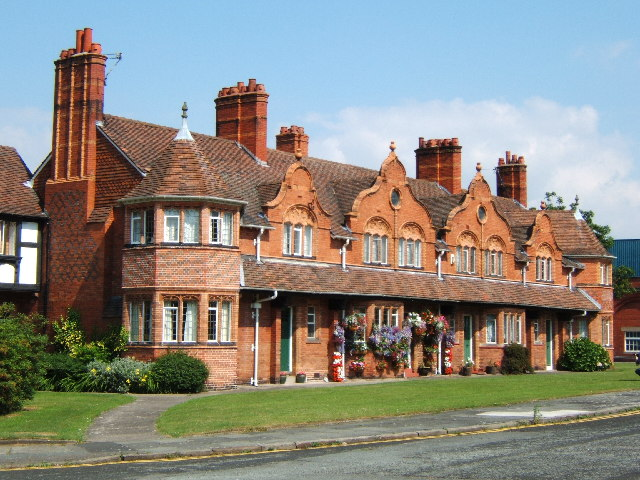
An example of houses at Port Sunlight.

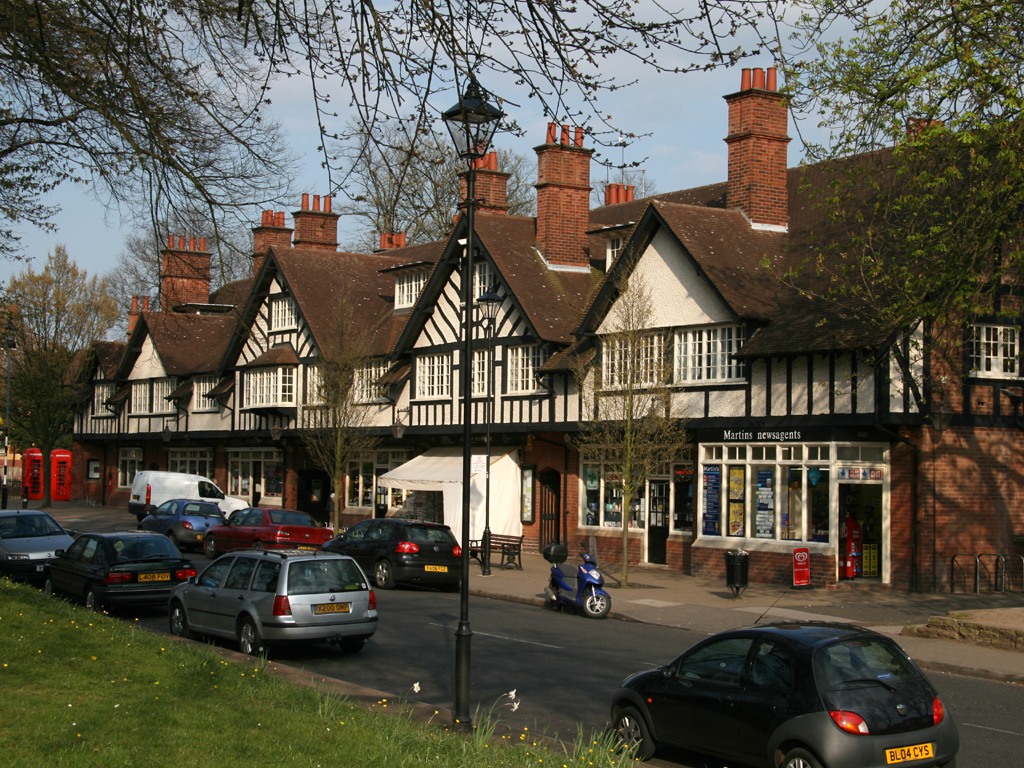
Typical local shopping parade in Bournville village

According to Jeremy Burchardt, the term model village was first used by the Victorians to describe the new settlements created on the rural estates of the landed gentry in the eighteenth century. As landowners sought to improve their estates for aesthetic reasons, new landscapes were created and the cottages of the poor were demolished and rebuilt out of sight of their country house vistas. However, according to the Oxford English Dictionary (2024), the first use of the term model village is post-Victorian, dating to 1906.

Starting in the 18th century, new villages were created at Nuneham Courtenay when the village was rebuilt as plain brick dwellings either side of the main road, at Milton Abbas the village was moved and rebuilt in a rustic style and Blaise Hamlet in Bristol had individually designed buildings, some with thatched roofs.

The Swing Riots of 1830 highlighted poor housing in the countryside, ill health and immorality and landowners had a responsibility to provide cottages with basic sanitation. The best landlords provided accommodation but many adopted a paternalistic attitude when they built model dwellings and imposed their own standards on the tenants charging low rents but paying low wages.

As the Industrial Revolution took hold, industrialists who built factories in rural locations provided housing for workers clustered around the workplace. An early example of an industrial model village was New Lanark built by David Dale. Philanthropic coal owners provided decent accommodation for miners from the early nineteenth century. Earl Fitzwilliam, a paternalistic colliery owner provided houses near his coal pits in Elsecar near Barnsley that were "...of a class superior in size and arrangement, and in conveniences attached, to those of working classes." They had four rooms and a pantry, and outside a small garden and pig sty.

Others were established by Edward Akroyd at Copley between 1849 and 1853 and Akroydon 1861–63. Akroyd employed George Gilbert Scott. Titus Salt built a model village at Saltaire. Henry Ripley, owner of Bowling Dyeworks, began construction of Ripley Ville in Bradford in 1866. Industrial communities were established at Price's Village by Price's Patent Candle Company and at Aintree by Hartley's, who made jam, in 1888. William Lever's Port Sunlight had a village green and its houses espoused an idealised rural vernacular style. Quaker industrialists, George Cadbury and Rowntrees built model villages by their factories. Cadbury built Bournville between 1898 and 1905 and a second phase from 1914 and New Earswick was built in 1902 for Rowntrees.

As coal mining expanded villages were built to house coal miners. In Yorkshire, Grimethorpe, Goldthorpe, Woodlands, Fitzwilliam and Bottom Boat were built to house workers at the collieries. The architect who designed Woodlands and Creswell Model Villages, Percy B. Houfton was influential in the development of the garden city movement.

In the 1920s, Silver End model village in Essex was built for Francis Henry Crittall. Its houses were designed in an art deco-style with flat roofs and Crittall windows.

=== England ===
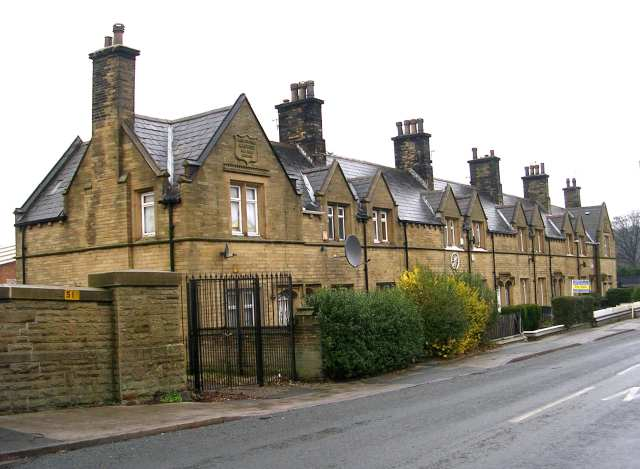
Almshouses at Ripley Ville, Yorkshire. Built 1881 and now the only remaining example of the architecture of the village

(Chronological order)

- Trowse, Norfolk (1805)
- Blaise Hamlet, Gloucestershire (1811)
- Selworthy, Somerset (1828)
- Barrow Bridge, Bolton (1830s)
- Vulcan Village, Merseyside (1833)
- Snelston, Derbyshire (1840s)
- Swindon Railway Village, Wiltshire (1840s)
- Withnell Fold, Lancashire (1844)
- Meltham, Yorkshire (1850)
- Bromborough Pool ("Price's Village"), Merseyside (1853)
- Saltaire, Yorkshire (1853)
- Akroydon, Yorkshire (1859)
- Nenthead, Cumberland (1861)
- New Sharlston Colliery Village, Yorkshire (1864)
- Ripley Ville, Yorkshire (1866)
- Copley, Yorkshire (1874)
- Howe Bridge, Lancashire (1873–79)
- Bournville, Worcestershire (1879)
- Barwick, Hertfordshire (1888)
- Port Sunlight, Merseyside (1888)
- Creswell Model Village, Derbyshire (1895)
- New Bolsover model village, Derbyshire (1896)
- Vickerstown, Lancashire (1901)
- New Earswick, Yorkshire (1904)
- Woodlands, Yorkshire (1905)
- Whiteley Village, Surrey (1907)
- The Garden Village, Kingston upon Hull, Yorkshire (1908)
- Silver End, Essex (1926)
- Stewartby, Bedfordshire (1926)

=== Ireland ===
- Milford, County Armagh, Northern Ireland (1800s)
- Portlaw, County Waterford, Republic of Ireland (1825)
- Sion Mills, County Tyrone, Northern Ireland (1835)
- Bessbrook, County Armagh, Northern Ireland (1845)
- Laurelvale, County Armagh, Northern Ireland (1850s)
- Model Village, County Cork (1910s; usually called Tower, the name of the pre-existing hamlet)

=== Scotland ===
- New Lanark, Lanarkshire (1786)

=== Wales ===
- Tremadog, Caernarfonshire (1798)
- Elan Village, Powys (1892)
- Portmeirion, Merioneth (1925)

== Europe ==
=== Czech Republic ===
- Zlín, located in Moravia, was organized and built by Tomáš Baťa to house and efficiently organize the workers of Bata Shoes.

=== Germany ===
- Stadt des KdF-Wagens was built for the Volkswagen factory.

=== Italy ===
- Crespi d'Adda in the Lombardy region, is a well-preserved model workers' village, and World Heritage Site since 1995. It was built from scratch, starting in 1878, to provide housing and social services for the workers in a cotton textile factory on the banks of the river Adda.

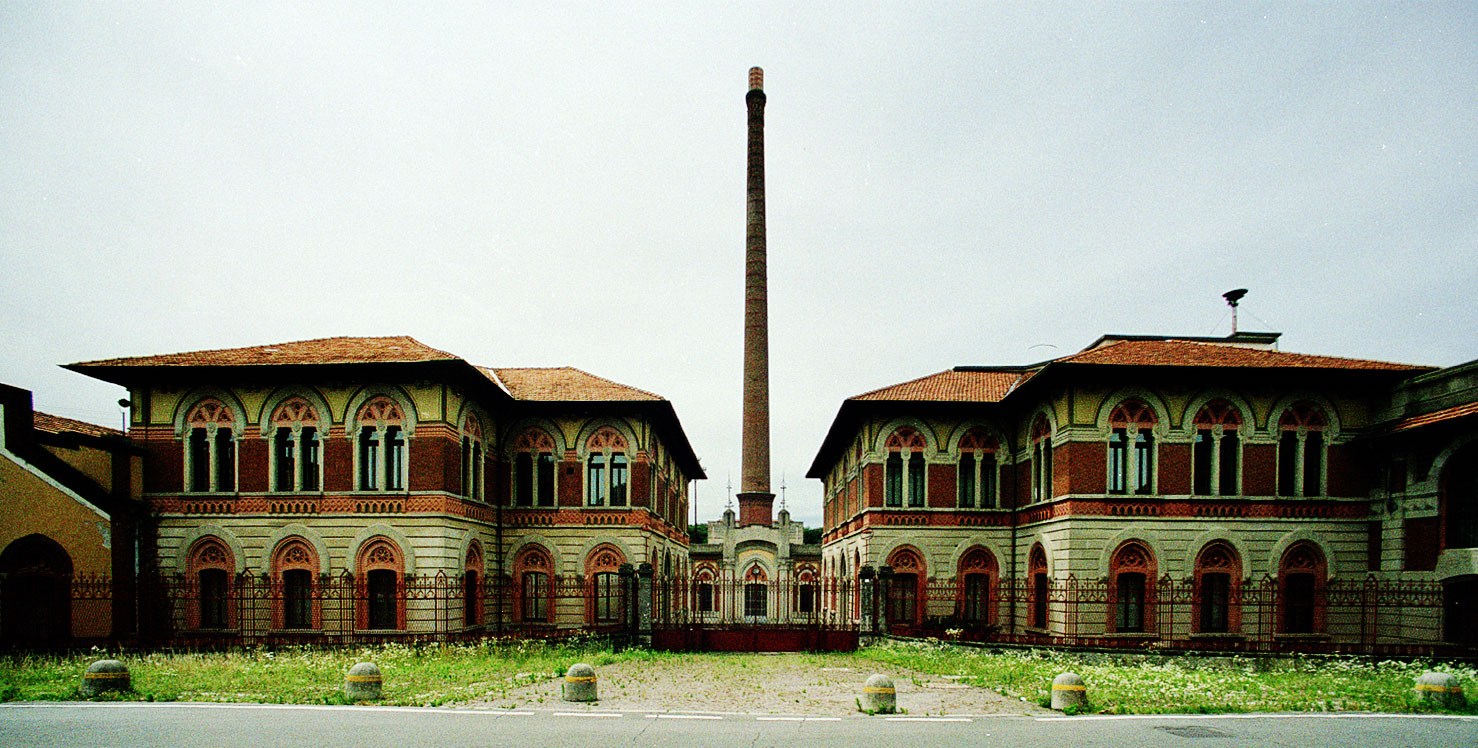
Crespi d'Adda

=== Netherlands ===
- Almere (1976)
- Batadorp (1934)
- Heveadorp (1916)
- Lelystad (1967)
- Philipsdorp (1910)

=== Spain ===
- Nuevo Baztán outside Madrid dates from the mercantilist and entrepreneurial ambitions of an industrialist from the early-eighteenth century.

== Australasia ==
=== Australia ===
- Australian Newsprint Mills established a worker's village at Boyer, Tasmania to accommodate workers of the Boyer Mill
- Cadbury established the Cadbury's Estate in Claremont, Tasmania in 1921
- EZ Industries constructed homes at Lutana, Tasmania for workers of the nearby Risdon Zinc Works, commencing in 1916
- Fyansford Paper Mill Workers' Cottages, Fyansford, Victoria

=== New Zealand ===
- Barrhill was laid out by its Scottish owner for the workers on his large sheep farm

== Asia ==
=== China ===
- Huawei Ox Horn Campus, research and development buildings of technology company Huawei

== See also ==
- Company town
- New Towns in the United Kingdom
- Garden city movement
