= Bromborough Pool =

Coordinates: 53°21′03″N 2°58′49″W

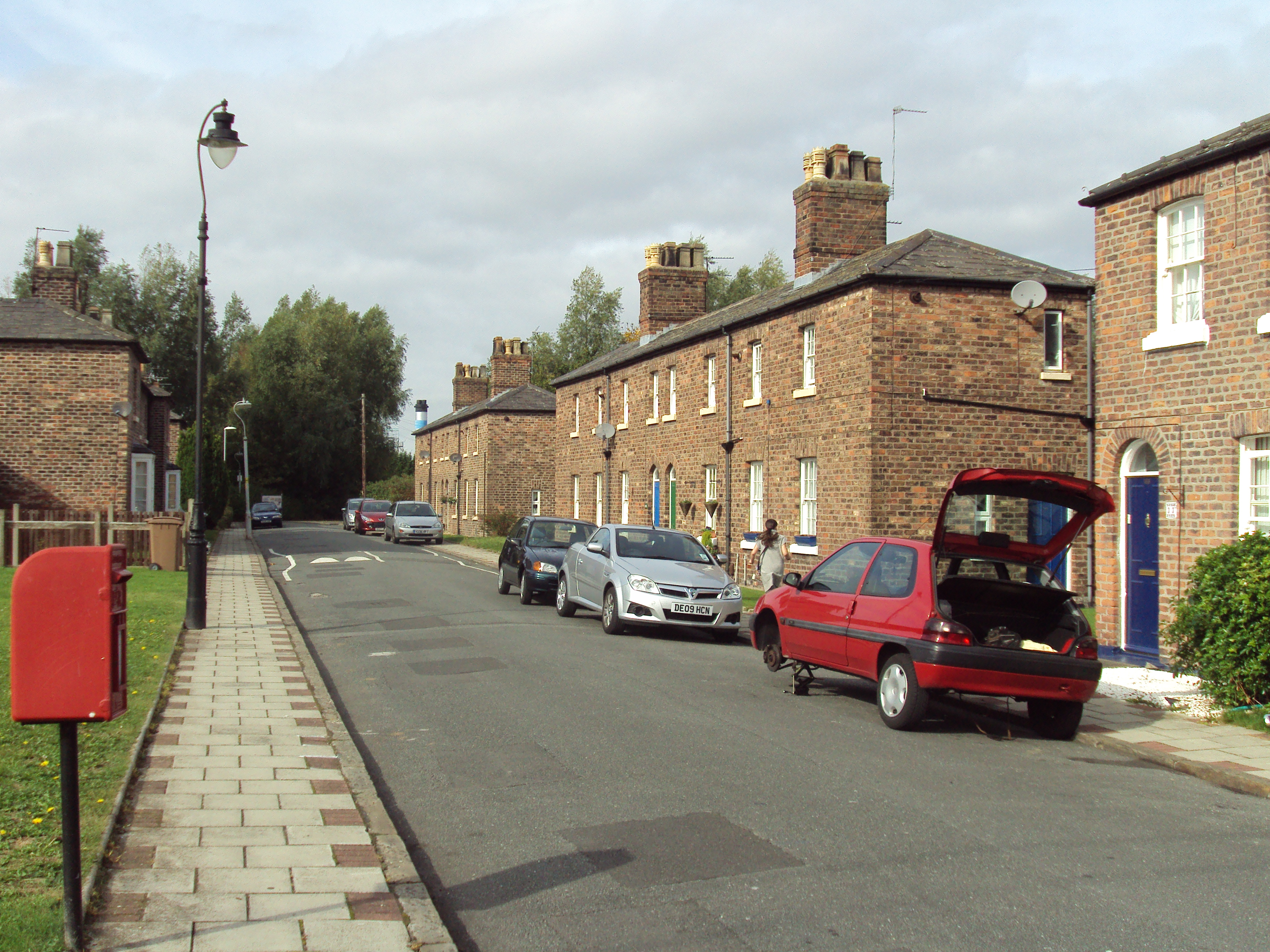

- Location within Merseyside
- Metropolitan borough: Wirral
- Metropolitan county: Merseyside
- Region: North West
- Country: England
- Sovereign state: United Kingdom
- Police: Merseyside
- Fire: Merseyside
- Ambulance: North West

Bromborough Pool, also known as Bromborough Pool Village and Price's Village, is a village within the Metropolitan Borough of Wirral, Merseyside, England, to the north of Bromborough. It is situated on the Wirral Peninsula, to the south of Bebington and to the north of Eastham.

Before local government reorganisation on 1 April 1974, it was part of the urban district of Bebington, within the county of Cheshire.

== Model village ==
Bromborough Pool was developed from 1853 to 1858 as a "model village" for the workers at the factory of Price's Patent Candle Company.

The completed village comprised 142 houses with a church, school, institute, shop and library for Price's workforce.

It predates the nearby model village of Port Sunlight just to its north, started in the 1880s.

== See also ==
- Listed buildings in Bromborough Pool
