= Price's Candles =

Candle supply company in England

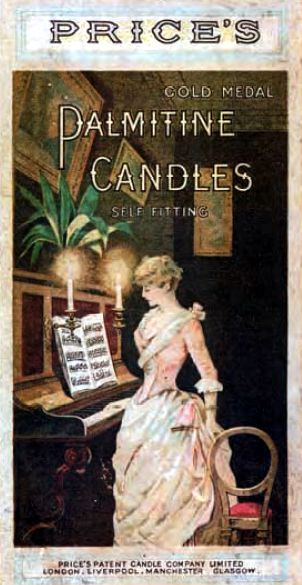
19th century advertisement

Price's Candles, founded in 1830, is an importer and retailer of candles based in Bedford, England. The company holds the royal warrant of appointment for the supply of candles and is one of the largest candle suppliers in the United Kingdom.

== History ==
=== Royal warrant ===
In 1840, Price's stearin 'composite' candles, produced from a mixture of refined tallow and coconut oil, gained prominence around the time of Queen Victoria's wedding. Traditionally, households would burn a candle in their windows on the evening of a monarch's wedding. Price's Patent Candles has held the royal warrant since the 1850s. Currently, it holds a royal warrant appointed by His Majesty the King.

=== Innovations ===
There was a potential market in England for a mid-priced candle that gave a brighter, cleaner light than tallow, but was not as expensive as beeswax. William Wilson licensed a patent for the hydraulic separation of coconut fats in 1829 and with partner Benjamin Lancaster they launched Edward Price and Co. in 1930 which made candles from coconut. They built a candle factory at Vauxhall on the Thames in South West London, a crushing mill just upriver at Battersea, and invested in a coconut plantation in Sri Lanka. The initial results were not very successful, but the company was helped when the candle tax was abolished in 1831.

In the 1820s a French chemist, Michel Eugène Chevreul, published his research on fatty acids. By mixing a strong alkali with vegetable or animal fats he discovered that the solution separated into liquid and solid components. This technique, known as saponification, was already used by soap makers, but nobody had employed it for candle manufacture. William Wilson's son, George, experimented with this process by adding further distillation. Price's were now able to refine tallow and vegetable oils to produce a harder, pure white fat called stearin. This improved the quality of the candles.

George Wilson began using palm oil, which was harvested and processed in West Africa. Wilson began processing palm oil with sulfuric acid which resulted in a cheaper source of fat. The British government was actively encouraging alternative commerce in Africa after the slave trade was abolished. Slavery had become unpopular in Britain and in 1847, when the company became Price's Patent Candles, they considered their ethical use of palm oil so important that the company's seal included "Africans bringing calabashes of palm oil to a seated Britannia figure under a palm tree".

=== Employees ===
In 1840, the company employed 84 staff. By 1855, with two factories in London and one in Bromborough Pool, this figure had risen to 2,300 of whom 1,200 were boys. William was involved in the London Missionary Society and his son James shared evangelical views. James established a Christian society at the factory in 1849, that provided religious services. Education was also provided at the factory, and the children were taken on outings, played sports and were provided with food.

The company sought to build good quality housing for its workers in London but could not buy any land. However, they were able to do this at the Wirral factory at Bromborough Pool. Here Price's eventually built a village of 147 houses, a church, institute, shop and library. This model village was an inspiration to other employers, and the idea was used at Lever's Port Sunlight factory adjacent to Bromborough.

=== Lubricant ===
Between 1900 and 1930 Price's Patent Candles dominated the lubricant market with products such as Huile de Luxe and Motorine. From 1906 to the 1930s all Rolls-Royce's new cars were sold supplied with Motorine oil.

== 21st century ==
In 2001 Price's Patent Candles relocated their headquarters to Bedford, Bedfordshire. The company fell into administration with the business now owed by Italian company SER, since 2003, and the majority of Price's Patent Candles manufacturing now done by SER in Turin.

== Awards ==
Price's Candles won best display stand at a 2019 Home Hardware trade show.
