= 2010 in the United Kingdom =

Events from the year 2010 in the United Kingdom

== Incumbents ==
- Monarch – Elizabeth II
- Prime Minister
  - Gordon Brown (Labour) (until 11 May)
  - David Cameron (Coalition) (starting 11 May)

== Events ==
=== January ===
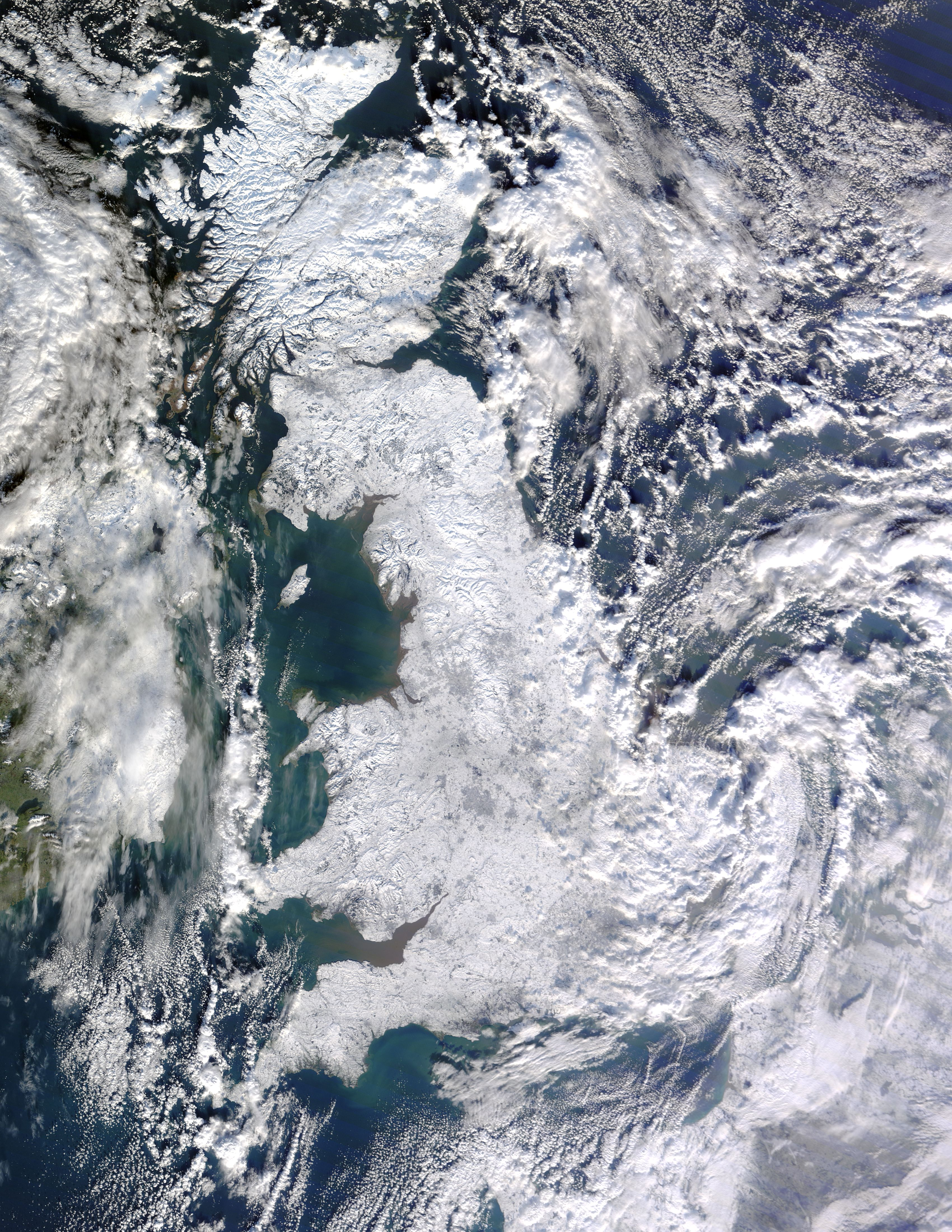
Satellite photo of Great Britain and Ireland during the cold spell.

- 3 January – Prime Minister Gordon Brown announces that full body scanners will be introduced at UK airports following the failed attack on Northwest Airlines Flight 253 on 25 December 2009.
- 5 January – The country is once again deluged by heavy snowfall as it endures its worst cold spell since the winter of 1981–82.
- 10 January – The Sunday Mirror defence correspondent Rupert Hamer is killed in an explosion in Afghanistan, the Ministry of Defence confirms.
- 12 January – Alastair Campbell, former government advisor, is interviewed by the Chilcot Inquiry, and said he is prepared to defend "every word" of the September 2002 dossier on Iraq's supposed weapons of mass destruction which led to the invasion of Iraq.
- 18 January – Following the collapse of strike talks late last year, British Airways cabin crew decides to vote again on possible strike action.
- 20 January – Unemployment falls for the first time in nearly two years, with the national total for November 2009 dipping by 7,000 to 2,460,000. However, some regions of Britain are still enduring a rise in unemployment, and experts say that the slight reduction in unemployment was largely due to an increase in people taking part-time work and work in occupations largely unrelated to their skills and experience.
- 26 January – The Office for National Statistics announces that the UK is no longer in recession, with gross domestic product having grown by 0.1%, a weaker rise than many economists had expected.
- 29 January – Former Prime Minister Tony Blair appears at the Iraq Inquiry and is questioned in public for the first time about his decision to take the United Kingdom to war against Iraq.

=== February ===
- 2 February – The Birmingham based confectionery giant Cadbury is taken over by American rival Kraft Foods in an £11.5 billion deal.
- 3 February – Opinion polls indicate that Labour have reduced the Conservative lead to as little as seven points, increasing the possibility of a hung parliament after the forthcoming general election.
- 5 February – Following a long period of negotiations, the political parties of Northern Ireland, including the Democratic Unionist Party and Sinn Féin, reach an agreement to allow for the devolution of policing and justice powers.

=== March ===
- 2 March
  - British Broadcasting Corporation Director General Mark Thompson confirms proposals to close BBC 6 Music and the BBC Asian Network as part of a cost-cutting drive. The plan would also see BBC Radio 7 rebranded as BBC Radio 4 Extra and cutbacks to the BBC website.
  - Jon Venables, one of the two boys (then aged 11) found guilty of murdering Merseyside toddler James Bulger in 1993, is recalled to prison after breaching terms of his life licence. Venables, 28, spent eight years in custody before being paroled along with Robert Thompson in 2001.
- 5 March – The Prime Minister Gordon Brown gives evidence to the Chilcott inquiry.
- 8 March
  - Jack Straw, the Justice Secretary, rejects ongoing public calls to give reasons why Jon Venables has been recalled to custody to be made public.
  - Following lengthy discussions, Royal Mail managers and Communication Workers Union representatives agree a deal to settle the postal workers dispute.
- 10 March – Chester City F.C., bottom of the Blue Square Premier League, go out of business after 125 years, less than a year after being relegated from the Football League where they have spent all but four seasons since 1931.
- 12 March
  - Birmingham couple Angela Gordon and Junaid Abuhamza receive prison sentences after being convicted of the manslaughter of Ms Gordon's seven-year-old daughter Khyra Ishaq, who died as a result of starvation two years ago. Ms Gordon is sentenced to 15 years in prison, while Mr Abuhamza is sentenced to indefinite imprisonment with a recommended minimum term of seven and a half years.
  - The Unite union which represents British Airways cabin crew announces two rounds of strike action for three days from 20 March and four days from 27 March.
- 20 March – The first British Airways strike, set to last for three days, begins. More than 80 planes are grounded at Heathrow Airport alone and numerous flights are reported to have been cancelled, though British Airways officials are confident that 65% of flights will be undisturbed.
- 21 March – The Times newspaper exposes a number of Labour Party politicians offering to use their positions to lobby for fictitious businesses in the 2010 cash for influence scandal.
- 22 March – The Labour Party suspends Members of Parliament Patricia Hewitt, Geoff Hoon, Margaret Moran and Stephen Byers from the party as a result of their involvement in the cash for influence scandal
- 30 March – Levi Bellfield, a 41-year-old man two years into a life sentence for murdering two women and attempting to murder a third, is charged with the murder of Surrey teenager Milly Dowler, who disappeared in Walton-on-Thames eight years ago and whose body was found in Hampshire woodland six months later.

=== April ===
- 6 April
  - The Prime Minister, Gordon Brown, visits Buckingham Palace to seek The Queen's permission to dissolve Parliament on 12 April, triggering a general election on 6 May.
  - Coroners and Justice Act 2009 Section 71 comes into effect, criminalising for the first time the holding of someone in slavery or servitude in the UK.
- 9–11 April – Metal detectorist Dave Crisp discovers the Frome Hoard, 52,503 Roman coins dating to the period 253–305, one of the largest such finds in Britain.
- 12 April
  - Policing and justice powers are devolved from Westminster to the Northern Ireland Executive. As part of the devolution process, David Ford, the leader of the Alliance Party of Northern Ireland, is elected Minister of Justice by the Northern Ireland Assembly.
  - Minutes later, a car bomb explodes outside the MI5 headquarters in County Down, Northern Ireland. The Real IRA claims responsibility for the bomb shortly after its detonation.
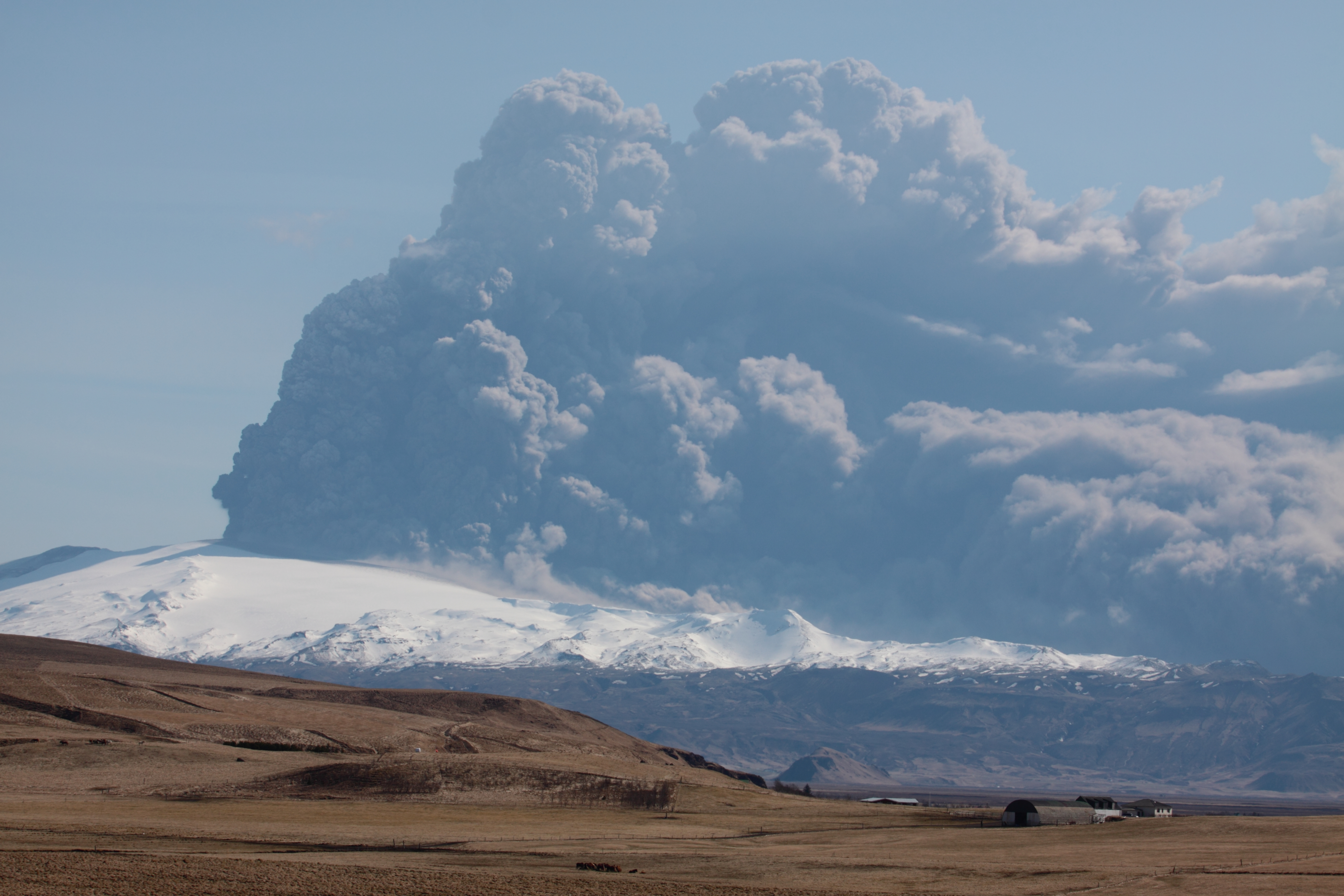
    The volcanic eruption that inconvenienced many British travellers.
- 15 April
  - A cloud of volcanic ash from the eruption of Eyjafjallajökull in Iceland causes the closure of airspace over the United Kingdom and northern and western Europe.
  - ITV1 airs the first of three election debates between Gordon Brown, David Cameron and Nick Clegg ahead of the 2010 general election. The debates are the first such debates to be broadcast live in the run-up to a UK general election.
- 15–16 April – An opinion poll puts the Labour Party at 28%, behind both the Conservatives on 33% and the Liberal Democrats on 30%, the first time since 1986 that a governing party has slipped into third place in an opinion poll.
- 17–18 April – Another opinion poll shows the Liberal Democrats with a 1% lead, also the first time since 1986 that an opinion poll has shown a third party on top. Two more polls are released in the next few days which show the Lib Dems in first place, and two more which show them tied with the Conservatives.
- 21 April – The government announces that British airports will reopen and passenger flights will resume, but officials caution that it will take time for flight schedules to return to normal after the six-day shutdown caused by volcanic ash from the 2010 eruptions of the Eyjafjallajökull volcano.

=== May ===
Leaders of the Main Parties

David Cameron,
Conservative Party Leader.

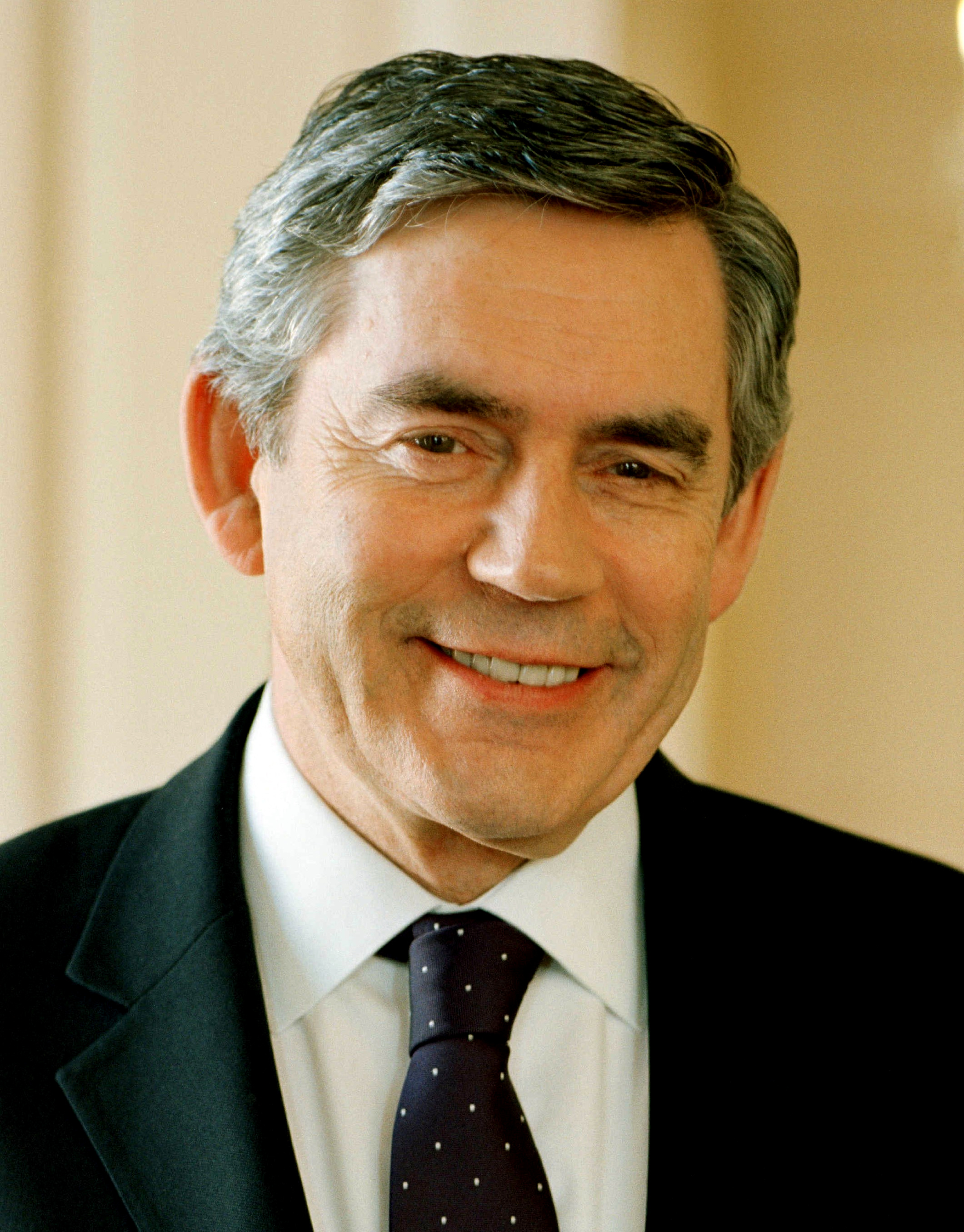
Gordon Brown,
Labour Party Leader.

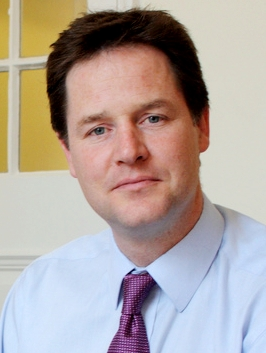
Nick Clegg,
Liberal Democrat Leader.

- 6 May
  - The 2010 general election takes place, resulting in a hung parliament. The Conservative Party win 306 of the 649 seats contested, placing them 20 seats short of an overall majority in the House of Commons. The Labour Party win 258 seats, the Liberal Democrats win 57, and other parties win 28.
  - Caroline Lucas, leader of the Green Party of England and Wales, becomes the party's first Westminster MP, being elected in the Brighton Pavilion constituency, and Peter Robinson, First Minister of Northern Ireland and Democratic Unionist Party leader, unexpectedly loses his Belfast East seat to the Alliance Party.
  - The 2010 local elections are also held across England in all 32 London boroughs, all 36 Metropolitan boroughs, 20 Unitary Authorities and 76 Non-metropolitan districts. The Labour Party gains 15 councils to control 36 overall, the Conservatives suffer a net loss of 8 councils, leaving them in control of 65, and the Liberal Democrats suffer a net loss of 4 local authorities, leaving them in control of 13 councils.
- 7 May – 2010 general election: The Conservative Party and the Liberal Democrats begin negotiations to reach either a parliamentary agreement, or to create a coalition government with a House of Commons majority.
- 8 May – 2010 general election: Liberal Democrat MPs endorse Nick Clegg's decision to negotiate with the Conservative Party in the first instance following the inconclusive result of the general election.
- 9 May – Chelsea become champions of the Premier League after beating Wigan Athletic 8–0 on the final day of the season.
- 10 May – 2010 general election: Gordon Brown announces that he will be stepping down as Labour leader, thus triggering a leadership election. Talks between the Lib Dems and Conservatives continue.
- 11 May
  - 2010 general election:
    - After the Labour Party fail to reach an agreement with the Liberal Democrats, Gordon Brown goes to Buckingham Palace to tender his resignation as Prime Minister to Queen Elizabeth II.
    - With a coalition government between the Conservatives and Liberal Democrats still being finalised, David Cameron is appointed Prime Minister by the Queen following Brown's resignation.
- 12 May
  - 2010 general election: Just after midnight, the Liberal Democrats emerge from a meeting of their Parliamentary party and Federal Executive to announce that the coalition deal had been formally approved "overwhelmingly", meaning that David Cameron will lead a coalition government of Conservatives and Liberal Democrats, with Lib Dem leader Nick Clegg as deputy prime minister.
  - In forming his new government, David Cameron appoints Sayeeda Warsi as Minister without Portfolio in the Cabinet, making her the first Muslim to serve in Cabinet.
  - 2010 Labour leadership election: David Miliband announces his candidacy. Interim leader Harriet Harman rules herself out of the running to hold the position permanently.
  - Unemployment remains above 2,500,000 for the second month running.
- 14 May – Stephen Timms, Labour MP and former treasury minister, is wounded in a stabbing in his East Ham constituency in Newham, London.
- 15 May
  - Chelsea complete the double with a 1–0 win over Portsmouth in the FA Cup Final at Wembley Stadium. In Scotland, Dundee United win the Scottish Cup with a 3–0 victory over Ross County at Hampden Park.
  - A 21-year-old woman, Roshonara Choudhry, is charged with the attempted murder of Stephen Timms.
- 16 May
  - 2010 Labour leadership election: Ed Miliband follows his brother David in declaring his candidacy.
  - The government announces an audit of spending commitments made during the final year of the previous Labour administration, and also announces a reduction in the budget for bonuses to senior civil servants.
- 17 May
  - The Chancellor of the Exchequer George Osborne announces the creation of the Office for Budget Responsibility to take over the Chancellor's role of economic and fiscal forecasting.
  - After a month of disruption, flight restrictions are lifted at all British airports after the volcanic ash over the nation's airspace moved away.
- 18 May – The 55th Parliament of the United Kingdom meet for the first time following the general election, with the first business being the election of the Speaker of the House of Commons. The incumbent speaker John Bercow is re-elected.
- 19 May – 2010 Labour leadership election: Ed Balls announces he will be contesting the leadership.
- 20 May – The requirement that house sellers in England and Wales must have a Home information pack produced before putting a property on the market is suspended by the coalition government.
- 21 May – David Cameron tells German leader Angela Merkel that he wants a strong role in the European Union but will not hand over any more powers to Brussels.
- 25 May – The first State Opening of Parliament of the new parliamentary session takes place.
- 26 May – A 40-year-old man is arrested on suspicion of murder after the bodies of three prostitutes are found in the River Aire in Bradford, West Yorkshire.
- 27 May
  - Stephen Griffiths, 40, is charged with the murder of three women whose bodies were found in Bradford.
  - Netto announces the sale of all its UK stores to Asda in a £778 million deal.
- 29 May – David Laws resigns as Chief Secretary to the Treasury after admitting he had claimed expenses to pay rent to his partner. He is succeeded by Scottish Secretary Danny Alexander.

=== June ===
- June
  - The Strata ("The Razor"), a 148-metre, 43-storey, 408-flat skyscraper at Elephant and Castle in the London Borough of Southwark, that incorporates wind turbines into its structure, is completed.
  - Beavers are bred in the wild in Scotland for the first time in 400 years.
- 1 June – Foreign minister William Hague announces that 41 Britons detained in Gaza are expected to be deported imminently.
- 2 June – Twelve people are killed and 25 injured after a gunman, identified as taxi driver Derrick Bird, goes on a killing spree in the Whitehaven, Egremont and Seascale areas of Cumbria. He is later found dead, having reportedly shot himself, in woodland at Boot.
- 3 June – Police release the names of the twelve people who were killed in yesterday's shootings in Cumbria. They include Derrick Bird's 52-year-old twin brother David, the family's 60-year-old solicitor Kevin Commons, and 31-year-old Garry Purdham, brother of rugby league player Rob Purdham.
- 8 June – Chancellor George Osborne pledges a "fundamental reassessment" of the way the government works as he outlines plans to involve the public in spending cuts.
- 15 June – The Saville Inquiry into Bloody Sunday finds that the British Army was "unjustified" in shooting 27 civilians in 1972. Prime Minister David Cameron later apologises on behalf of the Government.
- 16 June – The government announces that regional development agencies in England will be replaced by local enterprise partnerships by 2012.
- 20 June
  - The death toll of British forces in Afghanistan reaches 300 in nine years when a Marine dies of his injuries in Queen Elizabeth Hospital, Birmingham, after being wounded in Helmand.
  - British motorbike Grand Prix returns to Silverstone.
- 21 June – Jon Venables, one of the two killers of Merseyside toddler James Bulger, appears in court charged with possession and distribution of indecent images of children. Venables, now 28, was released on life licence in 2001 with a new identity after serving eight years for the murder, along with Robert Thompson.
- 22 June – Chancellor George Osborne presents the coalition government's emergency budget statement to the House of Commons. The most notable changes include a 2.5% increase in VAT to 20% and a 25% reduction in public spending.
- 25 June – David Cameron announces his intention to have all British troops home from Afghanistan by 2015.

=== July ===
- 3 July – Christopher Brown, 29, is shot dead in Gateshead, Tyne and Wear, by a gunman who badly wounds his 22-year-old girlfriend Samantha Stobbart.
- 4 July – PC David Rathband is badly wounded in another shooting incident in Newcastle-upon-Tyne. The gunman is reported to be 37-year-old Raoul Moat, who is also named as a suspect for the incident in Gateshead yesterday. Mr Moat had been released from prison on 1 July after spending nine weeks in prison for assault.
- 5 July – Deputy Prime Minister Nick Clegg announces that a referendum on introducing the alternative vote system for Westminster elections will be held on 5 May 2011.
- 7 July – The country commemorates the fifth anniversary of the 7/7 bombings, which killed 52 people on 7 July 2005.
- 9 July – Northumbria police are reported to have found an armed man, believed to be murder suspect Raoul Moat, in the local area and are negotiating with him to persuade him to give himself up.
- 10 July – The week-long police manhunt for Raoul Moat comes to an end after he shoots himself dead following a six-hour stand off with officers in a field at Rothbury, Northumberland.
- 11 July – The British Grand Prix at Silverstone is won by Mark Webber with Lewis Hamilton in second place.
- 14 July – David Cameron condemns individuals who have left tributes to Raoul Moat; floral tributes have been left at the scene of his suicide and a Facebook group has been set up in his memory.
- 16 July
  - The High Court rules that Yorkshire Ripper Peter Sutcliffe, jailed for life in 1981 for murdering 13 women and attempting to murder seven others, should never be released from custody. Sutcliffe, now 64, spent the first four years of his imprisonment in a mainstream prison before being declared insane and moved to a secure mental hospital in 1985, where he has remained ever since.
  - Jon Venables is sentenced to two years in prison after admitting distributing child pornography.
  - Economic growth stands at a four-year high of 1.1%, in only the third quarter of economic growth which followed a record six-quarters of detraction.
  - Gavin Grant, a former footballer who played for Millwall, Wycombe Wanderers and Bradford City, is found guilty of a murder committed in Harlesden, London, six years ago.
- 28 July – The Home Secretary Theresa May announces plans to scrap the use of Anti-Social Behaviour Orders in England and Wales.
- 29 July
  - The government announces that, as from October next year, employers will no longer have the right to force workers to leave without paying them off once they turn 65.
  - Metro Bank opens its first branch, in Holborn, London, the first wholly new high street bank for more than a century.

=== August ===
- 1 August – A scheme which allows parents to check if someone with access to their children is a sex offender, will be extended to cover the whole of England and Wales by spring 2011 after proving successful in four pilot areas.
- 3 August – The President of Pakistan, Asif Ali Zardari, arrives in the United Kingdom for a five-day visit as the two countries disagree about recent comments by David Cameron on "the export of terror".
- 6 August – During a meeting with Pakistani President Asif Ali Zardari, David Cameron speaks of an "unbreakable" friendship between Britain and Pakistan.
- 8 August – Government plans to scrap free school milk for under-5s are abandoned by David Cameron amid fears it would remind voters of the "Thatcher, Milk Snatcher" episode of Edward Heath's 1970–1974 government.
- 9 August – Martin O'Neill resigns after four years as manager of FA Premier League club Aston Villa, despite having guided them to European qualification in their previous three seasons – their best run for over a decade.
- 11 August – Unemployment falls to 2,460,000 in the sharpest fall in unemployment seen for three years. The number of people in employment has increased by 184,000 over the last three months – the sharpest quarterly rise since 1989.
- 13 August – The Government announces that the Audit Commission is to be scrapped, with its functions being transferred to the private sector.
- 16 August – Former Prime Minister Tony Blair is to give the £4.6 million advance and all royalties from his forthcoming memoirs, A Journey to a sports centre for badly injured soldiers.
- 17 August – Lord Pearson of Rannoch announces that he will step down as leader of the UK Independence Party less than a year after being elected to the position, stating that he is "not much good" at party politics.
- 22 August – Brazil wins the 2010 World Blind Football Championship after beating Spain 2–0 in the final at the Royal National College for the Blind in Hereford.
- 24 August – David Cameron's wife Samantha gives birth to their fourth child, a girl, later named Florence Rose Endellion, at the Royal Cornwall Hospital whilst on holiday in Cornwall.
- 29 August – The News of the World prints evidence that the current Lord's test between England and Pakistan was rigged in a match-fixing scam.

=== September ===
- 1 September – Former Prime Minister Tony Blair's memoirs, A Journey, are published, containing criticisms of his successor, Gordon Brown, claiming that Brown could be "maddening" and is "lacking emotional intelligence".
- 2 September – Seamus Heaney's poetry collection Human Chain is published and nominated for the 2010 Forward Poetry Prize.
- 3 September – Annie Turnbull, believed to be the oldest person in Britain, dies aged 111.
- 4 September – Tony Blair is pelted with missiles when attending a book signing in Dublin, Republic of Ireland; four people are arrested in connection with the attack, which is believed to have stemmed from protests against the Afghan and Iraqi wars.
- 8 September – Ian Cameron, father of the prime minister, dies in the South of France after suffering a stroke, aged 77.
- 10 September – The government unveils plans to privatise Royal Mail.
- 14 September
  - An inquiry into the death of Loyalist Volunteer Force leader Billy Wright, who was shot dead at Northern Ireland's Maze Prison in December 1997, states that his death was caused by serious failings by the Prison Service.
  - Singer George Michael, 47, is fined £1,250 and jailed for two months after being found guilty of crashing his car after taking cannabis.
- 16 September – Pope Benedict XVI arrives in Edinburgh to start a four-day state visit to Britain – its first papal visit since that of his predecessor Pope John Paul II in 1982. He meets with the Queen and on 19 September officially proclaims the beatification of John Henry Newman in Birmingham.
- 23 September – The Thanet Wind Farm is officially opened by Liberal Democrat MP Chris Huhne and Oystein Loseth, head of Swedish firm Vatenfall, who built the turbines, at a cost of £750 million over two years.
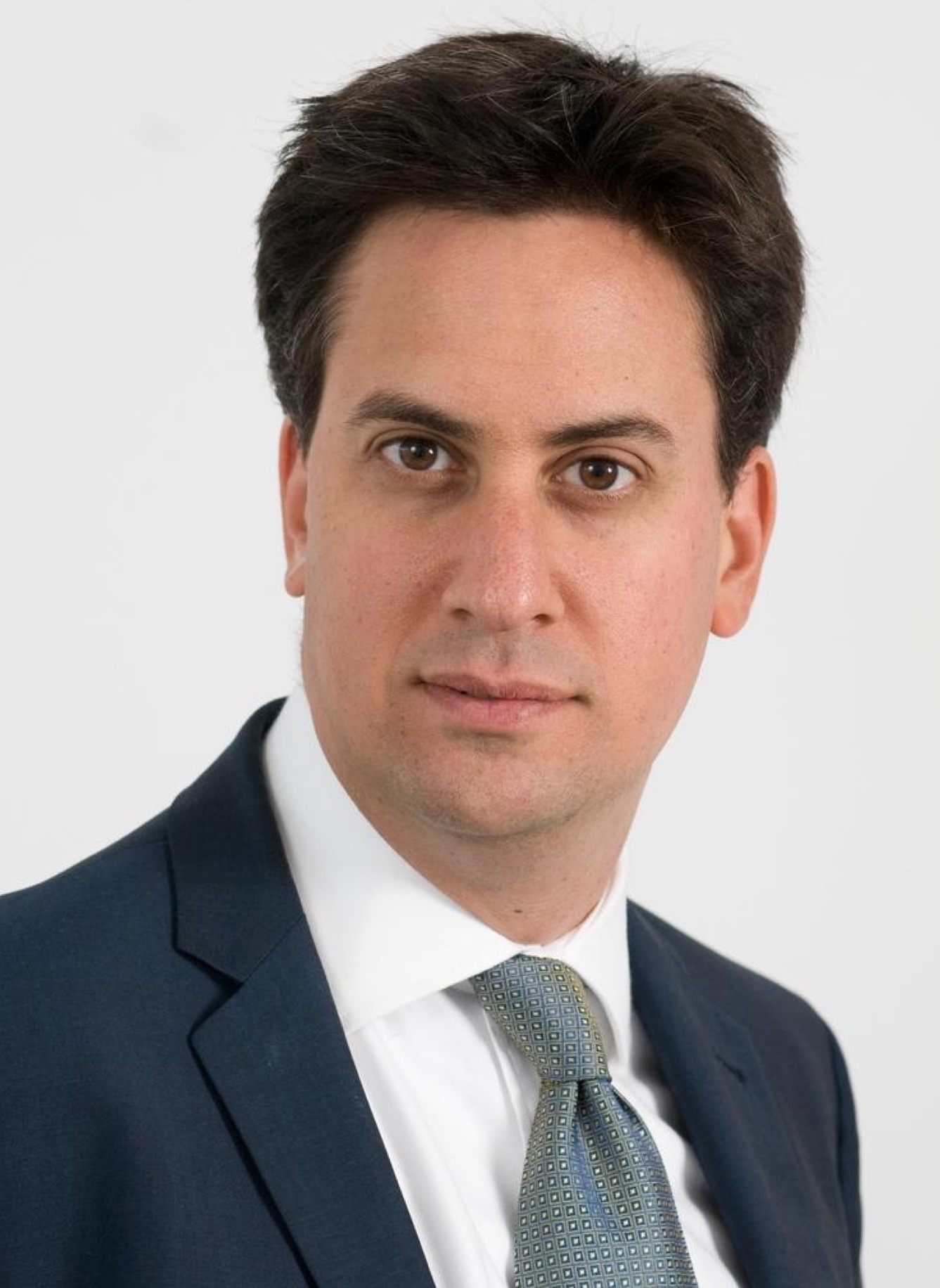
  Ed Miliband is elected Leader of the Labour Party on 25 September
- 25 September – 2010 Labour Party leadership election: Ed Miliband is elected the Leader of the Labour Party and Leader of the Opposition, narrowly beating his brother David in the final round of the leadership contest.
- 27 September – Labour Party activists at the conference in Manchester condemn the coalition government's proposed public spending cuts as "obscene".
- 28 September – Ed Miliband makes his first major speech as Labour leader at the party's Annual Conference telling delegates that his "new generation" will return the party to power.
- 29 September – After losing the Labour Party leadership election to his brother Ed, David Miliband announces that he will not be serving in his brother's shadow cabinet, although he will continue as an MP.

=== October ===
- 1 October
  - The Equality Act comes into effect, consolidating legislation requiring equal treatment in access to employment and services regardless of gender, race, health, disability, sexual orientation, belief and age.
  - Ryder Cup golf tournament opens at Celtic Manor Resort, the first time it has been held in Wales.
- 9 October – Foreign Secretary William Hague confirms that British aid worker Linda Norgrove, 36, who was captured in Afghanistan on 26 September, was killed during a failed mission by American special forces the previous day.
- 11 October – The inquest begins into the deaths of the 52 people who were killed in the terrorist attacks on London by Al-Qaeda members on 7 July 2005.
- 13 October – Ed Miliband attends his first Prime Minister's Questions as Leader of the Opposition.
- 15 October – American company New England Sports Ventures completes a £300 million takeover of Liverpool FC.
- 19 October – Defence Secretary Liam Fox announces that the flagship aircraft carrier HMS Ark Royal is to be scrapped imminently.
- 20 October – Chancellor George Osborne unveils the highest post-war cuts in public spending.
- 25 October
  - The Business Secretary, Vince Cable, promises a "very radical" overhaul of the state pension system.
  - A Populus opinion poll shows Labour one point ahead of the Tories on 38% – the first time in three years that a major opinion poll has shown Labour in the lead.
- 26 October – Independent Print Limited launches i, the first national daily newspaper for a quarter of a century. The 20p paper is aimed at "readers and lapsed readers of quality newspapers".
- 30 October
  - An explosive device is intercepted at East Midlands Airport, preventing a potential terrorist bombing of a passenger aeroplane. On the same day, a similar package is found on a cargo plane in Dubai. Al-Qaeda is suspected to have been responsible for both incidents.
  - Deputy Leader of the Labour Party Harriet Harman causes controversy after calling Liberal Democrat Treasury Secretary Danny Alexander a 'ginger rodent' at the Scottish Labour Party conference in Oban.

=== November ===
- 2 November
  - Human remains are found in Waterfoot, County Antrim; it is believed that they may be those of Peter Wilson, who was last seen alive in 1973 aged 21 and whose disappearance was linked to the Northern Ireland Troubles.
  - The Lancaster House Treaties are signed at 10 Downing Street on 2 November 2010 by President of France Nicolas Sarkozy and Prime Minister David Cameron.
- 4 November – The one millionth Range Rover is produced at the Land Rover factory in Solihull, 40 years after the original Range Rover was first produced.
- 5 November
  - A specially convened election court orders a re-run of the 2010 general election campaign in Oldham East and Saddleworth, the constituency of former Immigration Minister Phil Woolas after Woolas was found guilty of making false statements against an opponent during the original campaign.
  - Nigel Farage is re-elected as the leader of the UK Independence Party.
  - A concrete mixer lorry falls on a train near Oxshott.
- 10 November – University students riot outside the Conservative Party headquarters in Millbank, London, in protest against funding cuts and proposals to increase tuition fees.
- 11 November – The government unveils plans for the biggest shake up of the welfare system since the 1940s.
- 16 November
  - Clarence House announces the engagement of Prince William and Catherine Middleton. The couple will marry next year.
  - The UK Government announces they will pay millions of pounds in compensation to around a dozen British citizens who were held in detention overseas, including the camp at Guantanamo Bay, and claim British security services colluded in their torture.
- 19 November – Conservative Party politician Lord Young resigns as the coalition government's enterprise adviser after claiming that most Britons "have never had it so good" in spite of the recession.
- 24 November – A second protest in London sees thousands of students demonstrate. Trouble flares in Whitehall, resulting in 17 people being injured and 32 people are arrested. Unrest also spreads into cities including Brighton, Manchester, Oxford, Cambridge and Sheffield, with street protests and university building sit-in protests taking place.
- 25 November
  - The government unveils an £8bn investment package for Britain's railways.
  - An icy blast hits North East Scotland with weather forecasts suggesting the rest of the country will be affected in the coming days.
- 26 November – Black Friday (shopping) is introduced to the UK by Amazon.
- 27 November – Ed Miliband launches a two-year review of Labour Party policy, saying that the Party must move beyond New Labour and calling on activists to make it the "People's Party" again.
- 30 November – Plans are announced by the Secretary of State for Scotland, Michael Moore, to devolve major new financial powers to Scotland.

=== December ===
- December – Kids Run Free, a youth and sport charity is founded.
- 1 December – Heavy snow and freezing temperatures hit most of the country, with road, rail and air services disrupted and thousands of schools shut. Gatwick and Edinburgh Airports are both closed.
- 1 December (c.) – Spanish-born Ana Patricia Botín becomes the first woman chief executive officer of a British bank, Santander UK.
- 2 December – England's bid to host the 2018 FIFA World Cup fails, having attracted only two votes; FIFA awards the tournament to Russia instead.
- 3 December – The Royal Navy aircraft carrier HMS Ark Royal returns to Portsmouth for the last time before being decommissioned. The amphibious warfare ship HMS Albion is announced as her successor as the Royal Navy's flagship.
- 9 December
  - Labour MPs Geoff Hoon, Stephen Byers and Richard Caborn are banned from parliament by the Standards and Privileges Committee after being found guilty of breaching the Code of Conduct rules on lobbying in the 2010 cash for influence scandal. They received five-year, two-year and six-month bans respectively.
  - A second wave of protests in London by university students against increased tuition fees and reduced public spending on higher education take place in Whitehall, London. A Cenotaph war memorial and statue of Winston Churchill are vandalised, and a car transporting The Prince of Wales and The Duchess of Cornwall is attacked.
  - The coalition government win a vote in the House of Commons to raise the cap on university tuition fees in England to £9,000 with a majority of 21.
- 11 December – Scottish Transport Minister Stewart Stevenson resigns amid criticism of his handling of transport chaos brought on by recent heavy snow in Scotland.
- 12 December – Keith Brown is appointed as Scottish Transport Minister following yesterday's resignation of Stewart Stevenson.
- 13 December – First person convicted by a jury of murder after a prior acquittal for the same crime, following the 2003 change to the law on double jeopardy in England and Wales, Mark Weston, for the 1995 murder of a woman in Oxfordshire. He is sentenced to life imprisonment with a recommended minimum term of 13 years.
- 15 December – Unemployment has risen to 2,500,000 since October; the first monthly rise in six months.
- 16 December – The Scottish Government rules out re-introducing tuition fees for Scottish university students, but students from other parts of the United Kingdom attending university in Scotland may face fees of £6,000.
- 17 December – The British government announces plans to make prisoners serving less than four years eligible to vote.
- 21 December
  - The Business secretary, Vince Cable, loses power to rule on Rupert Murdoch's take-over of BSkyB after being recorded stating that he had "declared war" on Murdoch by undercover reporters from The Daily Telegraph.
  - Police in Bristol become concerned about the whereabouts of a woman, Joanna Yeates, who has not been seen since the evening of 17 December.
- 23 December – Former MSP Tommy Sheridan is convicted of perjury following a twelve-week trial.
- 26 December – Avon and Somerset Police say they are "satisfied" that a body found on Christmas Day near the village of Failand, Somerset is that of missing Bristol woman Joanna Yeates, who disappeared on 17 December.
- 28 December – Police launch a murder investigation after a post mortem into the death of Joanna Yeates concludes that she had been strangled.
- 29 December – Greater Gabbard wind farm first generates electricity.

=== Undated ===
- Broadcasting Tower, Leeds, by Feilden Clegg Bradley Studios, opens.
- Sinfonia Newydd, arts company is founded in Cardiff.
- A breeding colony of the Eurasian spoonbill forms in north Norfolk, the first in Britain for 300 years.
- New car sales increase slightly to just over 2 million this year. The Ford Fiesta is Britain's best selling car for the second year running, while the Nissan Qashqai enjoys record sales for a model in the growing crossover market as Britain's tenth best selling car with nearly 40,000 sales.

== Publications ==
- Howard Jacobson's comic novel The Finkler Question.
- Jon McGregor's novel Even the Dogs.

== Births ==
- 20 May – Lady Cosima Windsor, daughter of Earl and Claire, Countess of Ulster.
- 24 August – Florence Cameron, daughter of then-prime minister David Cameron
- 6 October – JJ Gabriel, Cypriot footballer
- 29 December – Savannah Phillips, daughter of Peter and Autumn Phillips and first great-grandchild of Elizabeth II.

== Deaths ==
=== January ===
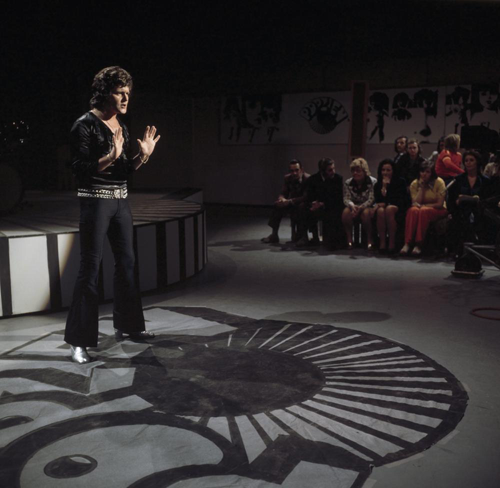
Neil Christian

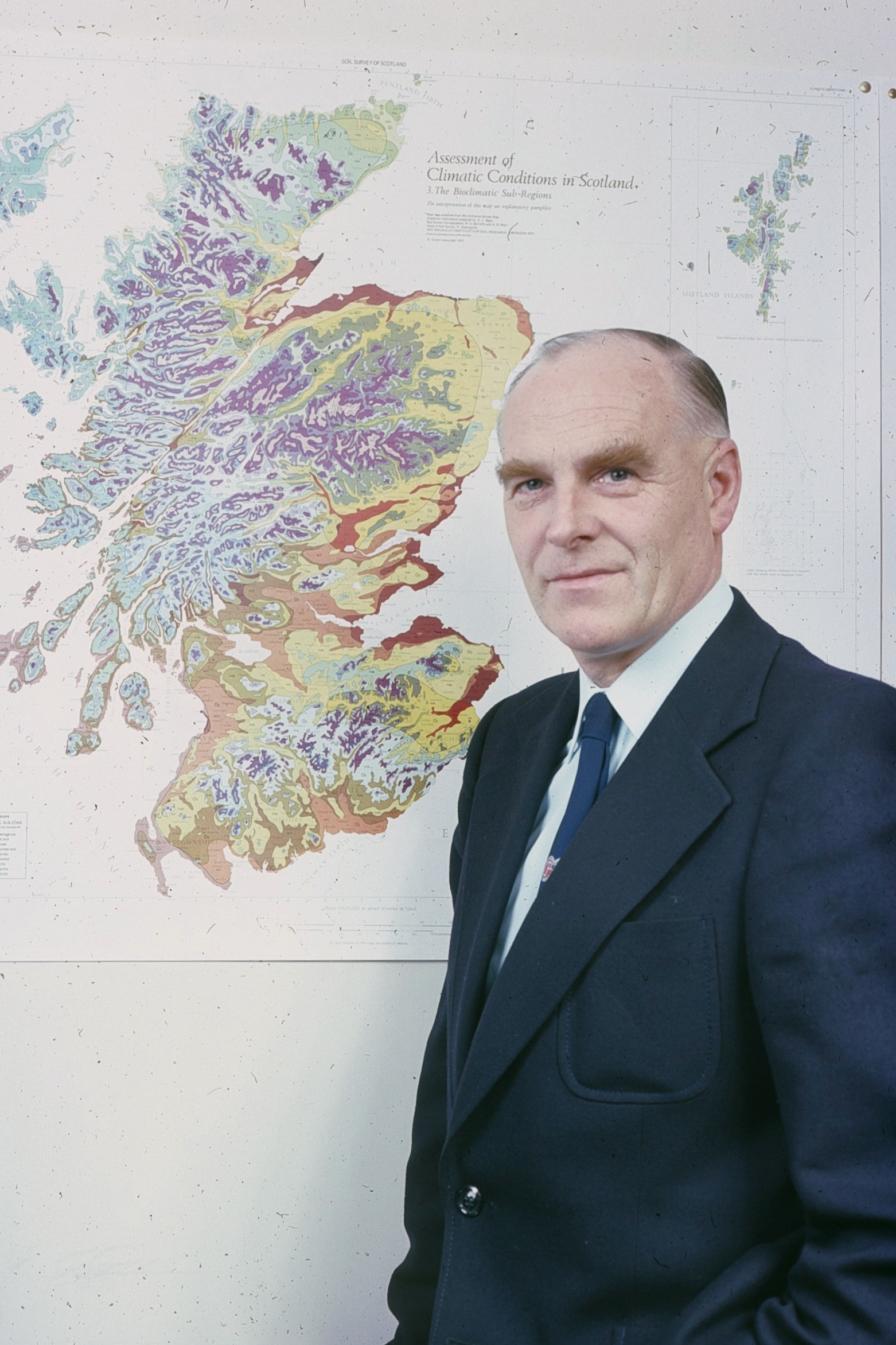
Thomas Summers West

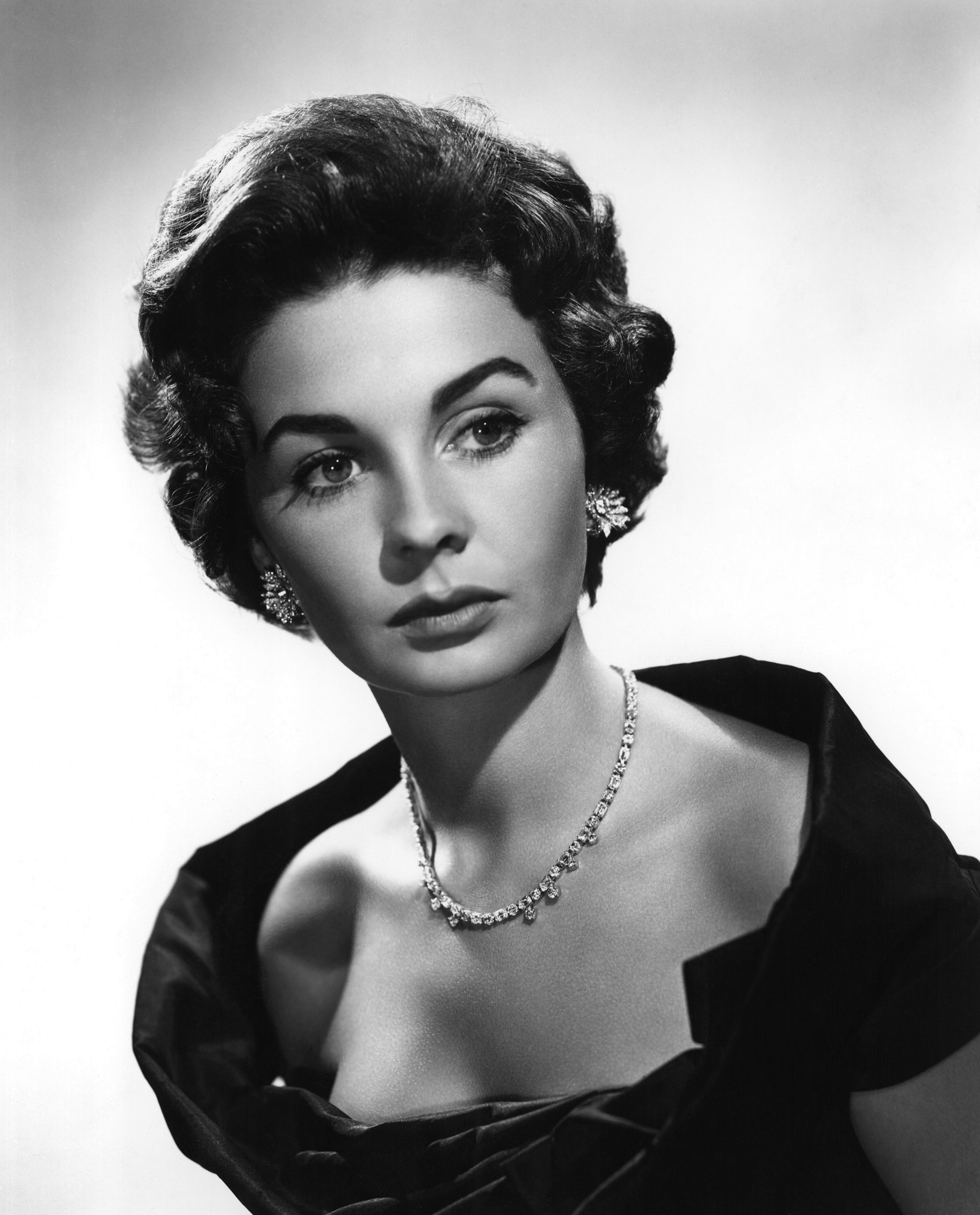
Jean Simmons

- 1 January – John Lyon, cricketer (b. 1951)
- 2 January – David R. Ross, historian (b. 1958)
- 3 January – Sir Ian Brownlie, barrister (b. 1932)
- 4 January
  - Neil Christian, singer (b. 1943)
  - Tony Clarke, record producer (b. 1941)
  - Hywel Teifi Edwards, Welsh-language academic and writer (b. 1934)
- 5 January – Philippa Scott, conservationist (b. 1918)
- 6 January
  - Michael Goulder, biblical scholar (b. 1927)
  - Graham Leonard, Anglican Bishop of London (1981–1991) and later Roman Catholic priest (b. 1921)
- 7 January
  - Alex Parker, footballer and football manager (b. 1935)
  - James D Robertson, painter (b. 1931)
- 9 January
  - Rupert Hamer, journalist (b. 1970)
  - Thomas Summers West, chemist (b. 1927)
- 10 January – Simon Digby, scholar (b. 1932)
- 12 January
  - Elizabeth Laverick, engineer (b. 1925)
  - Allen McClay, entrepreneur, founder of Almac Group (b. 1932)
- 15 January – Michael Creeth, biochemist (b. 1924)
- 19 January – Bill McLaren, rugby commentator (b. 1923)
- 20 January
  - Jack Parry, footballer (b. 1924)
  - John Pawle, cricketer (b. 1915)
  - Derek Prag, politician, MEP for Hertfordshire (1979–1994) (b. 1923)
- 22 January
  - Sir Percy Cradock, diplomat (b. 1923)
  - Gordon Richardson, Baron Richardson of Duntisbourne, banker, Governor of the Bank of England (1973–1983) (b. 1915)
  - Jean Simmons, actress (b. 1929)
- 28 January
  - Patricia H. Clarke, biochemist (b. 1919)
  - Patricia Leonard, opera singer (b. 1936)
- 29 January – Sir Derek Hodgkinson, air chief marshal (b. 1917)
- 30 January
  - Lucienne Day, textile designer (b. 1917)
  - Ursula Mommens, potter (b. 1908)
- 31 January – Patricia Gage, actress (b. 1940)

=== February ===
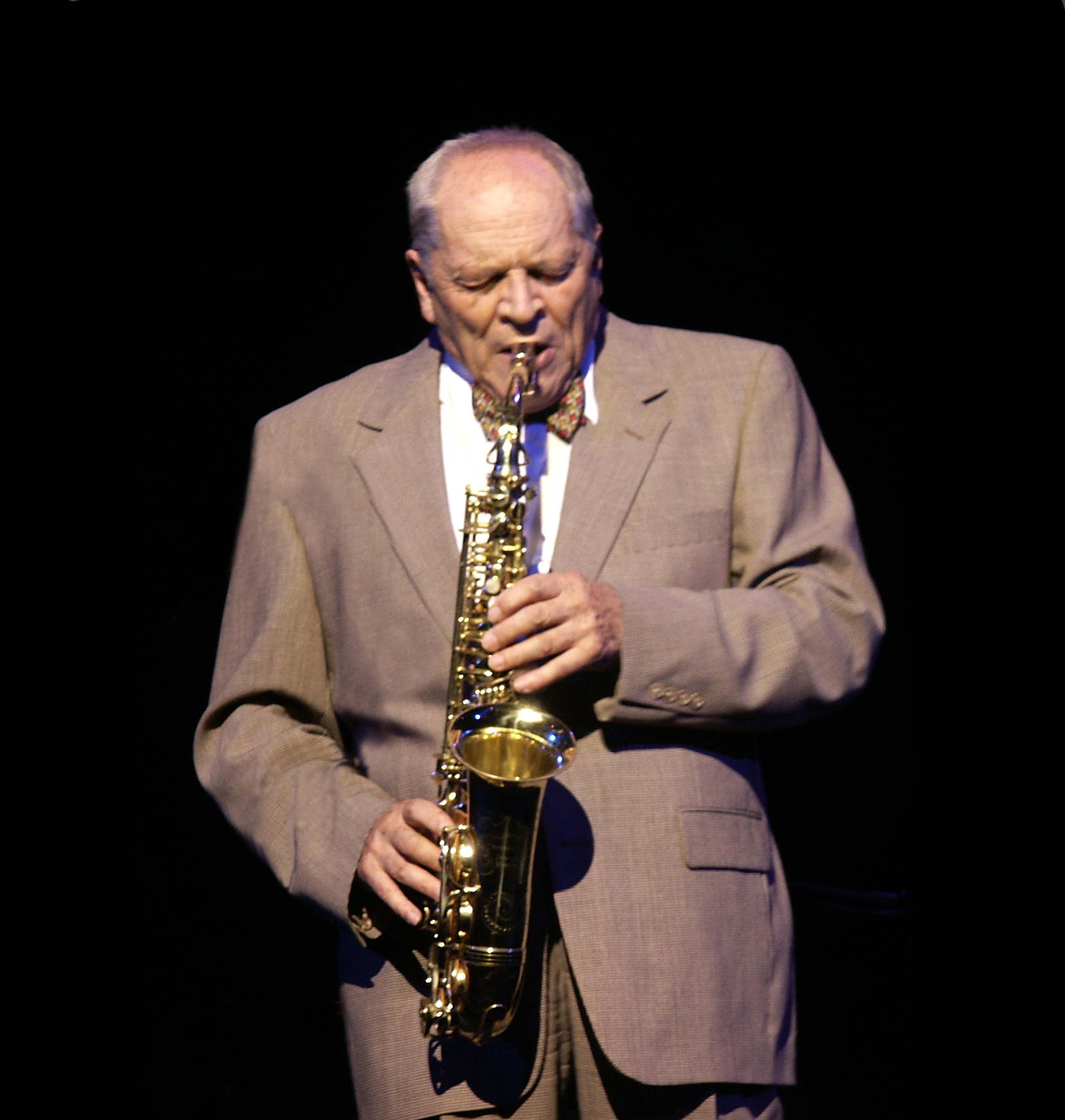
Sir John Dankworth

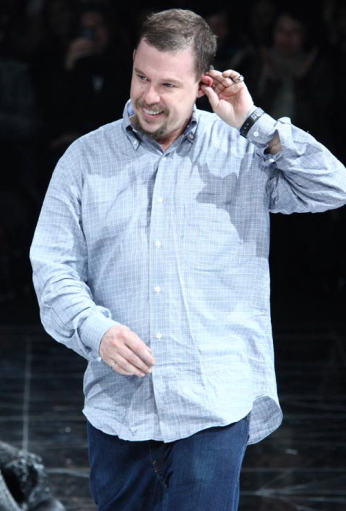
Alexander McQueen

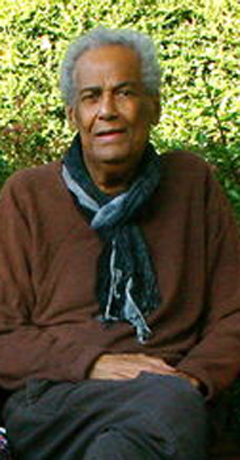
Cy Grant

- 2 February – Donald Wiseman, assyriologist (b. 1918)
- 3 February – Gil Merrick, footballer and football manager (b. 1920)
- 4 February – Allan Wicks, organist and choirmaster (b. 1923)
- 5 February
  - Peter Calvocoressi, historian, publisher and intelligence officer (b. 1912)
  - Ian Carmichael, actor (b. 1920)
- 6 February
  - Albert Booth, politician (b. 1928)
  - Sir John Dankworth, jazz composer and musician (b. 1927)
- 7 February – Daniel Joseph Bradley, physicist (b. 1928)
- 9 February
  - Alfred Gregory, mountaineer and photographer (b. 1913)
  - Malcolm Vaughan, singer and actor (b. 1929)
- 10 February – David Tyacke, Army major-general (b. 1915)
- 11 February
  - Alexander McQueen, fashion designer (b. 1969)
  - David Severn, writer (b. 1918)
  - Colin Ward, anarchist writer (b. 1924)
- 13 February
  - Werner Forman, photographer (b. 1921, Czechoslovakia)
  - Cy Grant, actor (b. 1919, British Guiana)
  - John Reed, actor and opera singer (b. 1916)
  - Roger Thatcher, statistician (b. 1926)
- 14 February – Dick Francis, novelist and former jockey (b. 1920)
- 15 February – Claud William Wright, civil servant and scientific expert (b. 1917)
- 19 February
  - Lionel Jeffries, actor (b. 1926)
  - Walter Plowright, veterinary scientist (b. 1923)
- 20 February – Jason Wood, comedian (b. 1972)
- 21 February – Bob Doe, Battle of Britain air ace (b. 1920)
- 22 February – Robin Davies, actor (b. 1954)
- 23 February – Wyn Morris, orchestral conductor (b. 1929)
- 25 February – Barbara Bray, translator (b. 1924)
- 26 February – Charles le Gai Eaton, diplomat and author (b. 1921, Switzerland)
- 27 February – Wendy Toye, actress (b. 1917)
- 28 February
  - Martin Benson, actor (b. 1918)
  - Rose Gray, chef and cookery writer (b. 1939)

=== March ===
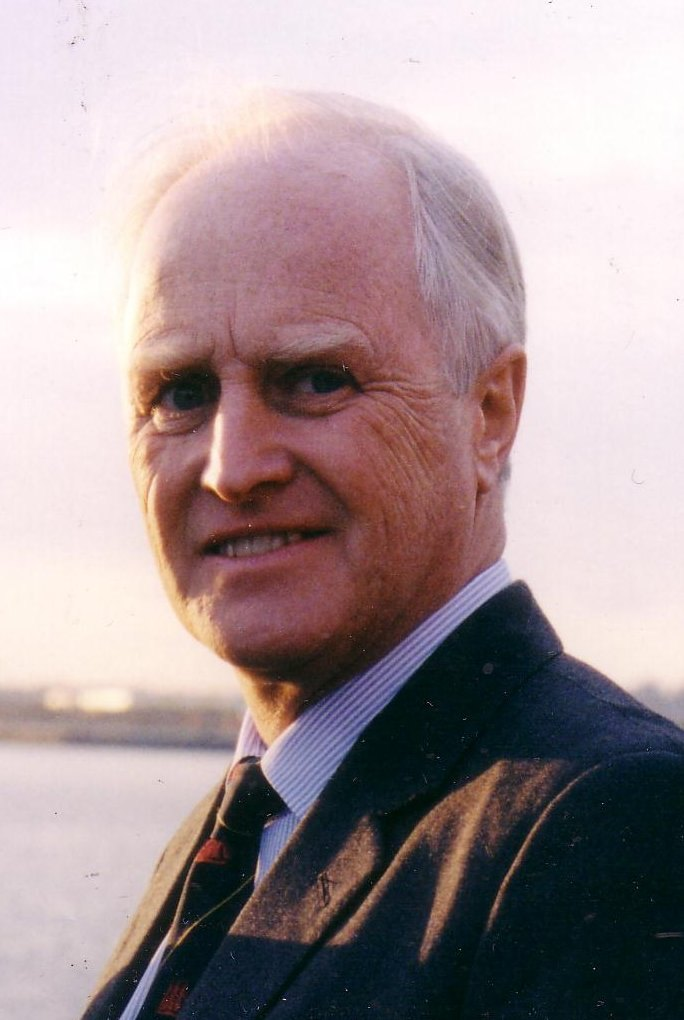
Winston Churchill

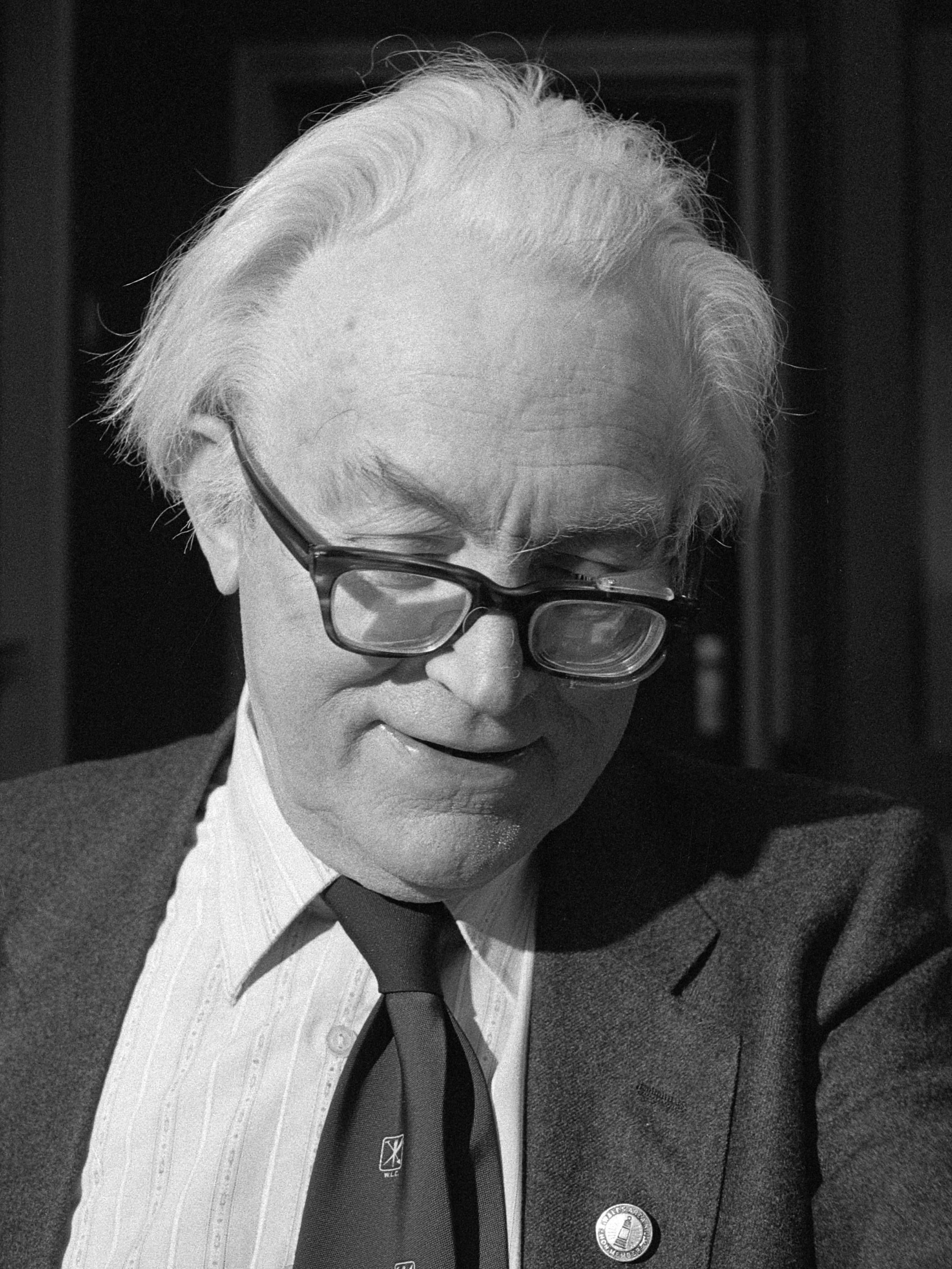
Michael Foot

- 1 March – Kristian Digby, television presenter and director (b. 1977)
- 2 March – Winston Churchill, politician (b. 1940); grandson of former prime minister Sir Winston Churchill
- 3 March
  - Keith Alexander, footballer and manager (b. 1956)
  - Michael Foot, politician, Leader of the Opposition (1980–1983) (b. 1913)
- 4 March – Fred Wedlock, folk singer (b. 1942)
- 5 March – Philip Langridge, tenor (b. 1939)
- 6 March – Carol Marsh, actress (b. 1926)
- 7 March – Sir Kenneth Dover, classicist, President of the British Academy (1978–1981) (b. 1920)
- 10 March – George Webb, jazz musician (b. 1917)
- 12 March – Lesley Duncan, singer-songwriter (b. 1943)
- 13 March – Neville Meade, boxer (b. 1948, Jamaica)
- 14 March
  - Chimen Abramsky, historian (b. 1916, Russian Empire)
  - Janet Simpson, Olympic athlete (b. 1944)
- 15 March – Ashok Kumar, politician (b. 1956)
- 17 March – Charlie Gillett, radio presenter and record producer (b. 1942)
- 18 March – William Wolfe, Scottish politician (b. 1924)
- 19 March
  - Gerald Drucker, double bass player (b. 1925)
  - George Lane, World War II Army colonel (b. 1915)
- 20 March
  - Harry Carpenter, sports commentator (b. 1925)
  - Ian Knight, stage designer (b. 1940)
  - Robin Milner, computer scientist (b. 1934)
- 22 March
  - Sir James W. Black, doctor (b. 1924)
  - Diz Disley, jazz guitarist (b. 1931, Canada)
- 23 March – Alan King-Hamilton, barrister and judge (b. 1904)
- 24 March
  - William Mayne, writer of children's fiction (b. 1928)
  - Daphne Park, diplomat and spy (b. 1921)
- 27 March
  - Stephen Hearst, television and radio executive (b. 1919, Austria)
  - Stanley Vann, organist and composer (b. 1910)
- 28 March
  - David Carnegie, 14th Earl of Northesk, peer (b. 1954)
  - John Lawrenson, rugby league player (b. 1921)

=== April ===
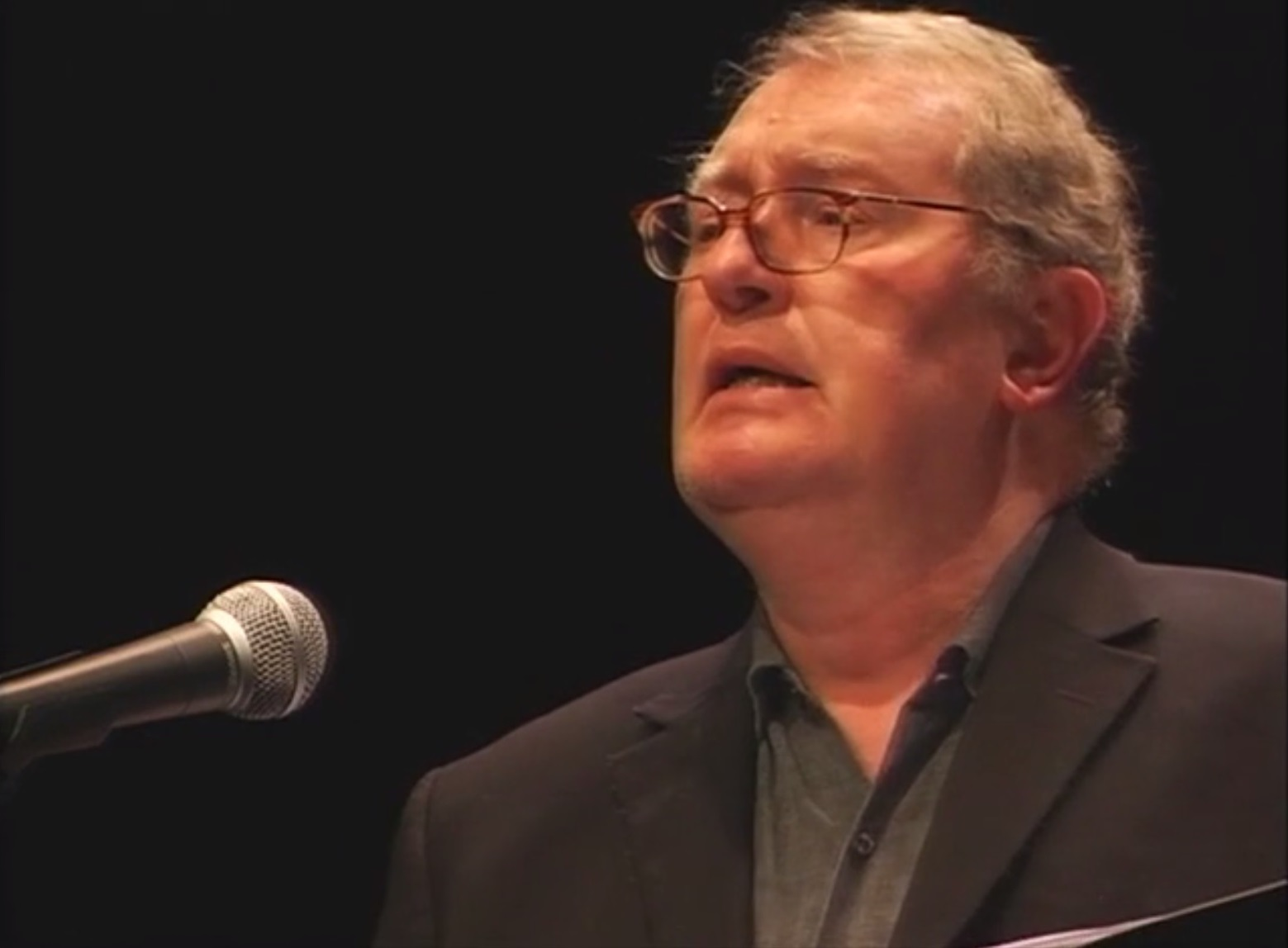
Corin Redgrave

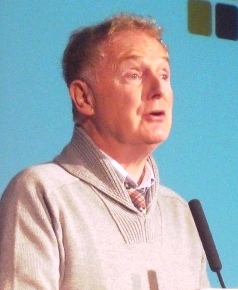
Malcolm McLaren

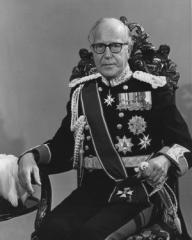
Peter Ramsbotham, 3rd Viscount Soulbury

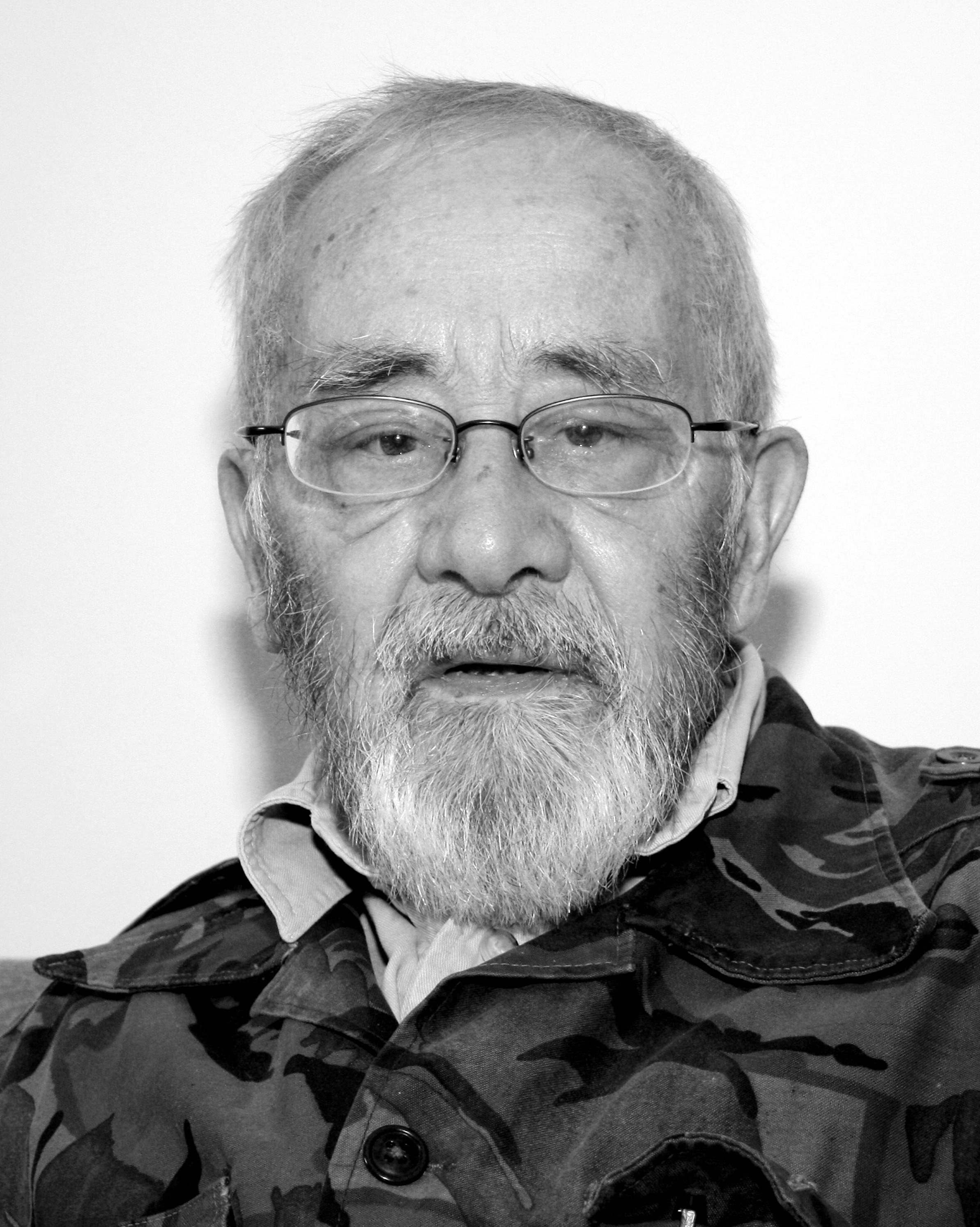
Alan Sillitoe

- 1 April – Julia Lang, actress and radio presenter (b. 1921)
- 3 April – Tia Rigg, murder victim (b. 1998)
- 4 April – Sir Alec Bedser, cricketer (b. 1918)
- 5 April – William Neill, poet (b. 1922)
- 6 April
  - James Aubrey, actor (b. 1947, Austria)
  - David Quayle, entrepreneur, co-founder of B&Q (b. 1936)
  - Corin Redgrave, actor and political activist (b. 1939)
  - Sid Storey, footballer (b. 1919)
- 7 April – Christopher Cazenove, actor (b. 1943)
- 8 April
  - Mark Colville, 4th Viscount Colville of Culross, peer and judge (b. 1933)
  - Antony Flew, philosopher (b. 1923)
  - Malcolm McLaren, impresario and former Sex Pistols manager (b. 1946)
- 9 April
  - John Griffiths, museum curator (b. 1952)
  - Kenneth McKellar, tenor (b. 1927)
  - Peter Ramsbotham, 3rd Viscount Soulbury, peer and diplomat, Governor of Bermuda (1977–1980) (b. 1919)
- 10 April – Sir Gordon Shattock, veterinarian, Conservative politician and survivor of the Brighton hotel bombing (b. 1928)
- 11 April – John Batchelor, racing driver and politician (b. 1959)
- 12 April – Stuart Robbins, basketball player (b. 1976)
- 13 April – Gerald Stapleton, World War II air ace (b. 1920)
- 14 April
  - Tom Ellis, politician (b. 1924)
  - Greville Starkey, jockey (b. 1939)
- 16 April
  - Bryn Knowelden, rugby league player (b. 1919)
  - R. D. Middlebrook, electrical engineer (b. 1929)
- 18 April – Tom Fleming, actor (b. 1927)
- 21 April
  - Sammy Baird, footballer and football manager (b. 1930)
  - Sir Idwal Pugh, civil servant (b. 1918)
- 22 April – Peter B. Denyer, electronics engineer (b. 1953)
- 23 April
  - Edward Lyons, politician (b. 1926)
  - George Townshend, 7th Marquess Townshend, Britain's longest-serving peer (b. 1916)
- 24 April – Angus Maddison, economist (b. 1926)
- 25 April – Alan Sillitoe, writer (b. 1928)
- 27 April
  - Peter Cheeseman, theatre director (b. 1932)
  - Morris Pert, musician (b. 1947)
- 29 April – Sandy Douglas, computer scientist (b. 1921)
- 30 April – Antony Grey, gay rights activist (b. 1927)

=== May ===
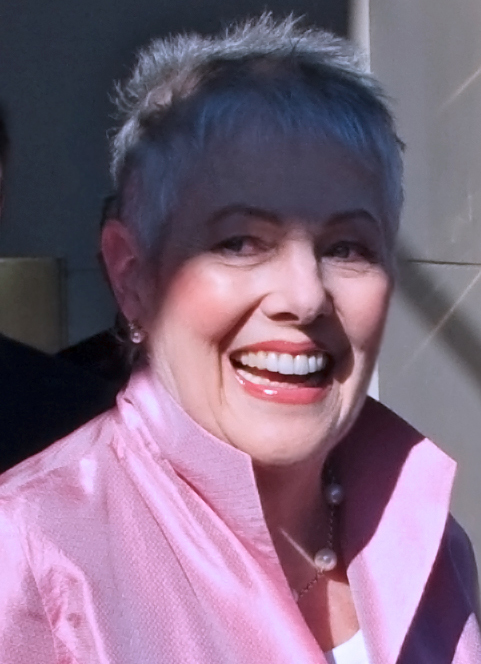
Lynn Redgrave

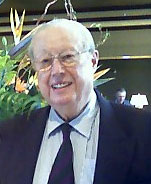
John Shepherd-Barron

- 2 May – Lynn Redgrave, actress (b. 1943)
- 3 May
  - Jimmy Gardner, actor (b. 1924)
  - Peter O'Donnell, comic strip writer (b. 1920)
- 4 May – Peter Heathfield, trade unionist (b. 1929)
- 6 May – Dennis Sharp, architect (b. 1923)
- 7 May – Pamela Green, actress (b. 1929)
- 8 May – Alan Watkins, political journalist (b. 1933)
- 10 May
  - Jack Birkett, dancer, singer, mime artist and actor (b. 1934)
  - Charles Currey, Olympic sailor (b. 1916)
- 15 May – John Shepherd-Barron, inventor of the automatic teller machine (b. 1925)
- 16 May – Frank Dye, sailor (b. 1928)
- 17 May – Richard Gregory, psychologist (b. 1923)
- 18 May – John Gooders, ornithologist (b. 1937)
- 20 May – Leonard Wolfson, Baron Wolfson, businessman and life peer (b. 1927)
- 22 May – Keith Jessop, diver and marine treasure hunter (b. 1933)
- 23 May – Simon Monjack, screenwriter, producer and director (b. 1970)
- 24 May
  - Ray Alan, ventriloquist (b. 1930)
  - Barbara New, actress (b. 1923)
  - Stella Nova (formerly Steve New), rock guitarist (b. 1960)
- 26 May – Sir Christopher Moran, RAF air marshal (b. 1956)
- 28 May
  - Sir Hugh Ford, engineer (b. 1913)
  - David Sanger, organist (b. 1947)
- 29 May
  - Joan Rhodes, actress (b. 1921)
  - Rudi Vis, politician (b. 1941, the Netherlands)
- 30 May – Brian Duffy, photographer (b. 1933)

=== June ===
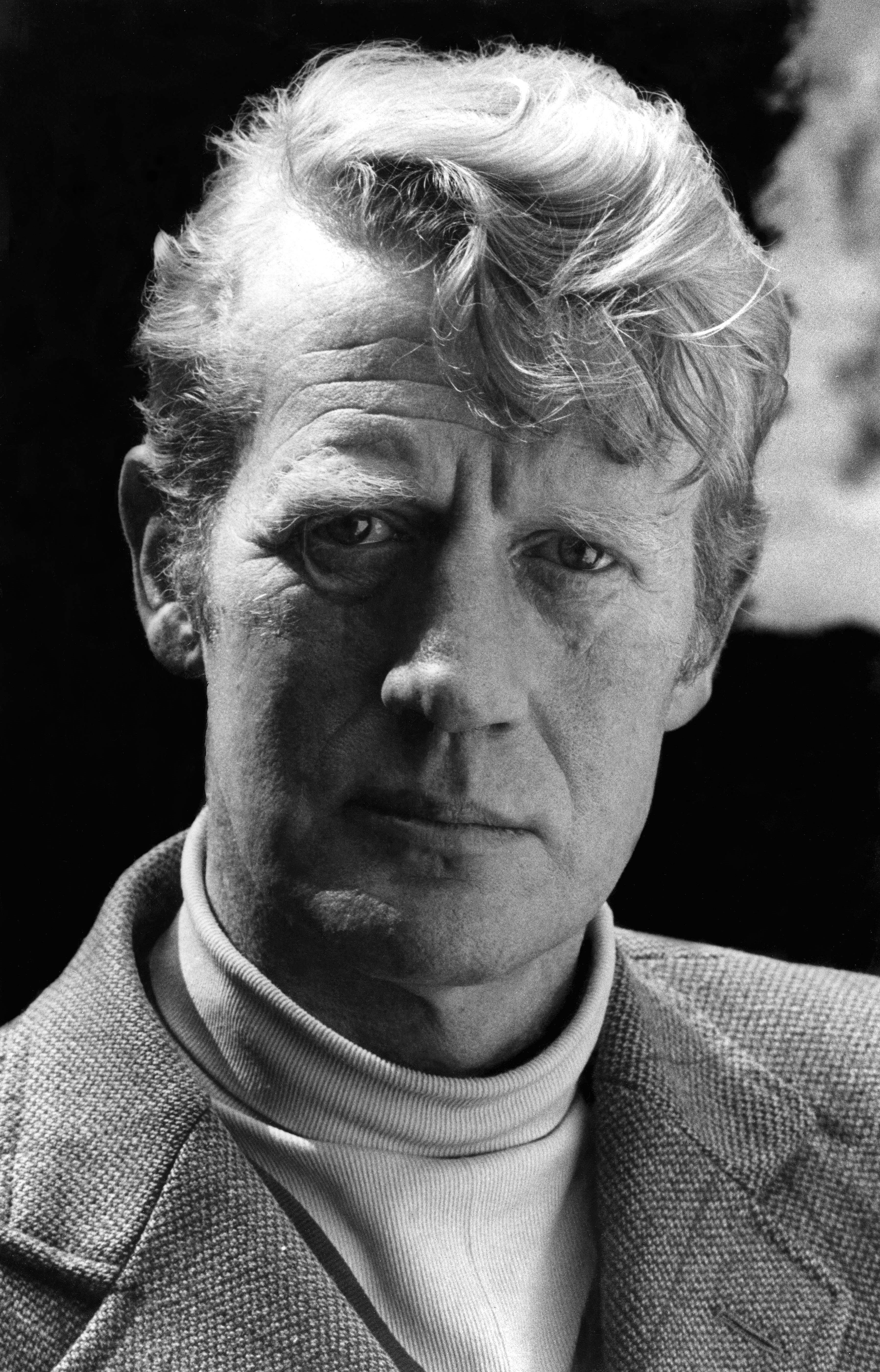
15th Duke of Hamilton

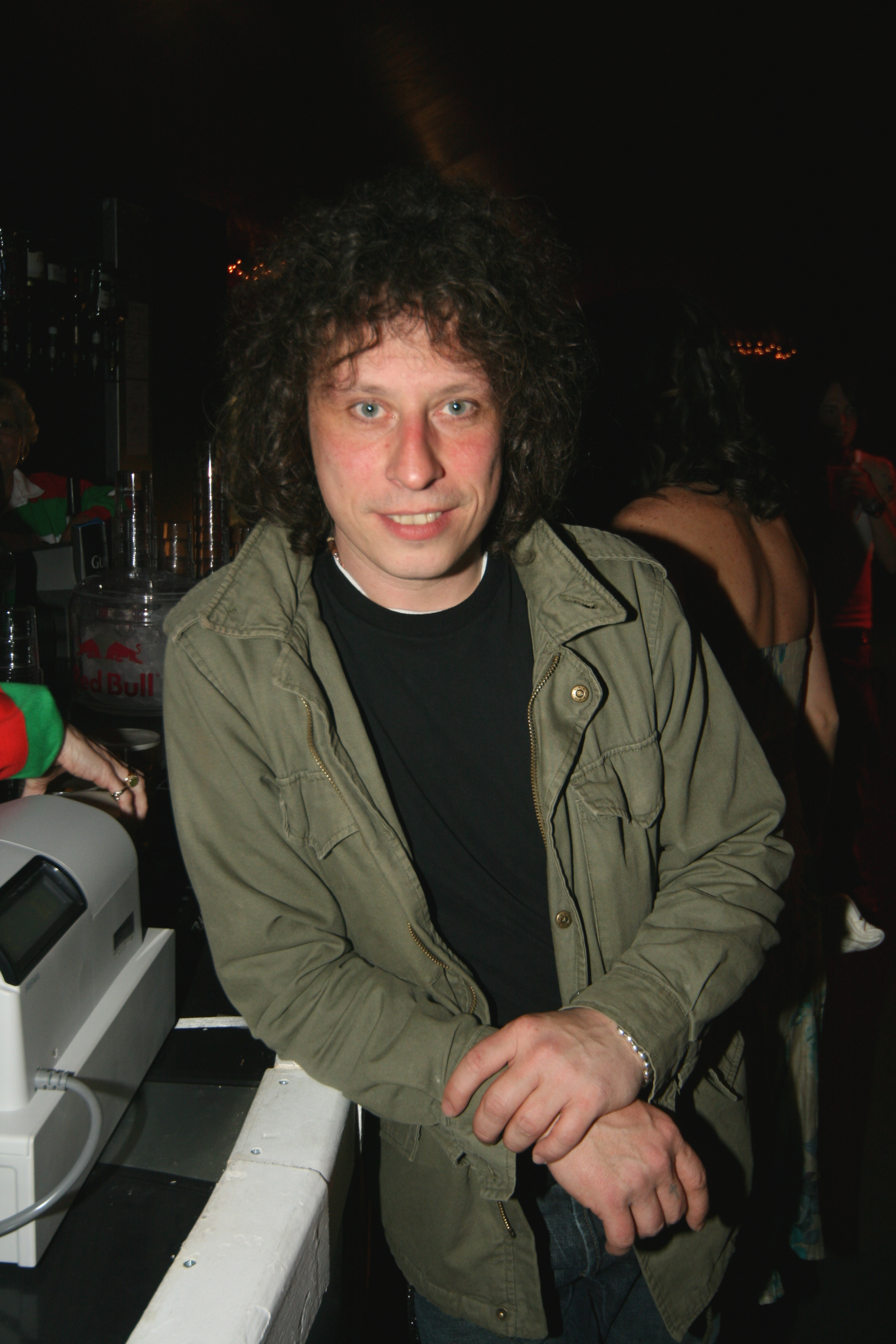
Stuart Cable

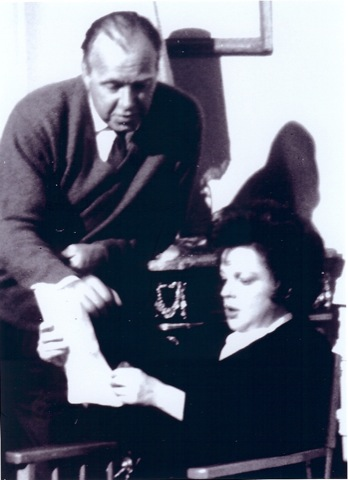
Ronald Neame with Judy Garland

- 1 June – John Hagart, footballer and football manager (b. 1937)
- 3 June
  - John Hedgecoe, photographer (b. 1932)
  - Robert Hudson, broadcaster (b. 1920)
- 4 June
  - Raymond Allchin, archaeologist (b. 1923)
  - Jack Harrison, Royal Air Force pilot, last survivor of the Stalag Luft III Great Escape (b. 1912)
- 5 June – Angus Douglas-Hamilton, 15th Duke of Hamilton, peer and landowner (b. 1938)
- 7 June – Stuart Cable, rock drummer (b. 1970)
- 8 June – Crispian St. Peters, singer-songwriter (b. 1939)
- 11 June
  - Bernie Andrews, radio producer (b. 1933)
  - Teresa Jungman, socialite (b. 1907)
  - Johnny Parker, jazz pianist (b. 1929)
- 12 June
  - Richard Keynes, physiologist (b. 1919)
  - Egon Ronay, food critic (b. 1915, Hungary)
- 16 June – Ronald Neame, director and writer (b. 1911)
- 17 June
  - Sebastian Horsley, artist (b. 1962)
  - Andy Ripley, rugby union player (b. 1947)
- 19 June
  - Robin Matthews, economist (b. 1927)
  - Antony Quinton, Baron Quinton, philosopher (b. 1925)
  - Dame Angela Rumbold, politician (b. 1932)
- 20 June – Harry B. Whittington, palaeontologist (b. 1916)
- 21 June
  - Russell Ash, writer and publisher (b. 1946)
  - Chris Sievey, comedian and musician (b. 1955)
  - Tam White, musician and actor (b. 1942)
- 22 June – Robin Bush, historian (b. 1943)
- 23 June
  - Michael Cobb, Army officer and railway historian (b. 1916)
  - Pete Quaife, musician (b. 1943)
  - Peter Walker, Baron Walker of Worcester, politician (b. 1932)
- 25 June
  - Brian Flowers, Baron Flowers, physicist (b. 1924)
  - F. Gwynplaine MacIntyre, science fiction writer (b. 1948)
  - Alan Plater, writer (b. 1935)
- 27 June – Ken Coates, politician and writer (b. 1930)
- 30 June – Harry Klein, jazz saxophonist (b. 1928)

=== July ===
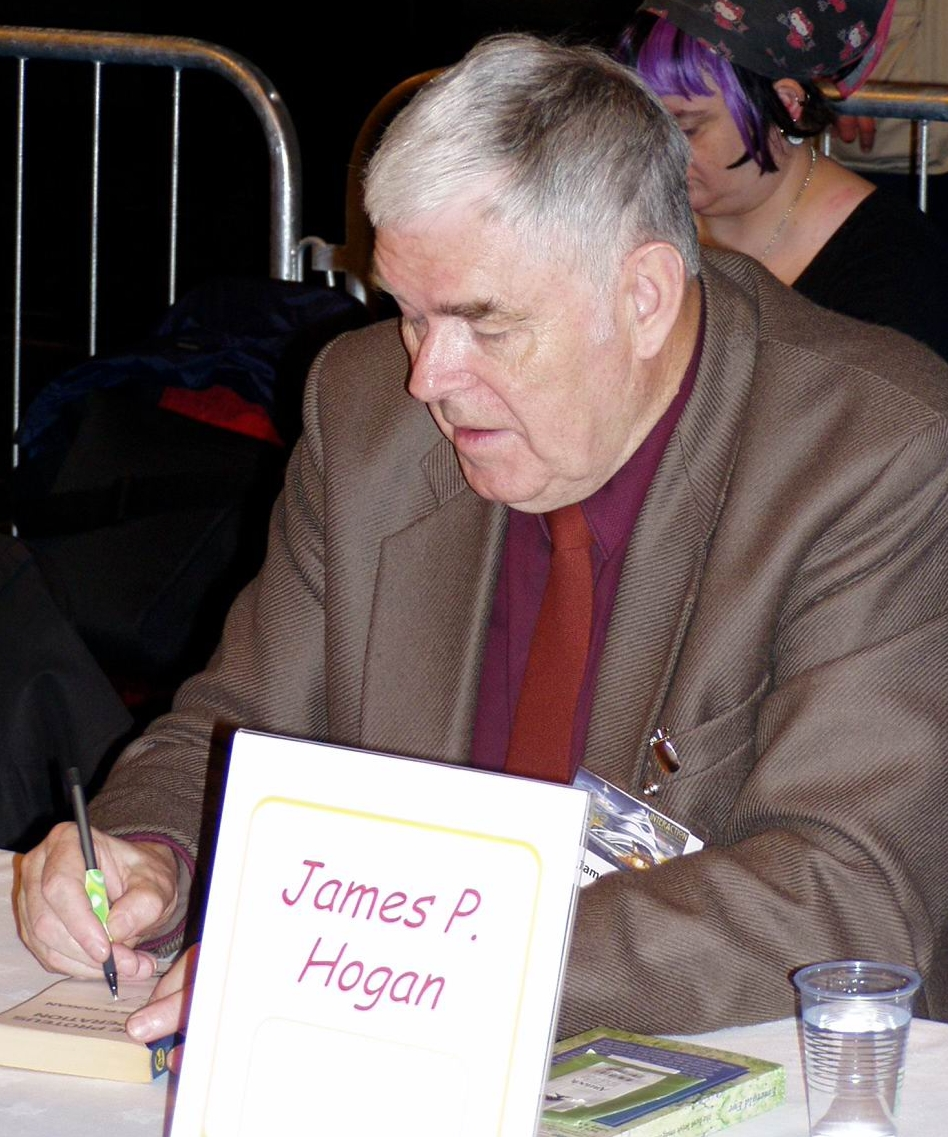
James P. Hogan

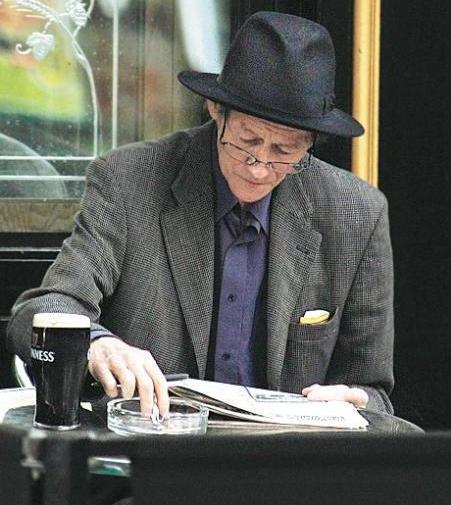
Alex Higgins

- 1 July – Geoffrey Hutchings, actor (b. 1939)
- 2 July – Dame Beryl Bainbridge, novelist (b. 1934)
- 3 July – Frederick Warner, engineer (b. 1910)
- 5 July
  - David Fanshawe, composer (b. 1942)
  - Pete Morgan, poet (b. 1919)
  - Elton Younger, Army major-general (b. 1919)
- 6 July – Roy Waller, radio presenter (b. 1940)
- 8 July – John Moore, Royal Navy officer and writer (b. 1921)
- 9 July
  - Mark Bytheway, Quizzing World Champion (2008) (b. 1963)
  - Basil Davidson, historian (b. 1914)
  - Marrack Goulding, diplomat (b. 1936)
- 10 July
  - David Gay, Army major and cricketer (b. 1920)
  - Leonard Hemming, cricketer (b. 1916)
- 12 July – James P. Hogan, science fiction writer (b. 1941)
- 13 July
  - Ken Barnes, footballer (b. 1929)
  - Alan Hume, cinematographer (b. 1924)
- 16 July – Verily Anderson, author and biographer (b. 1915)
- 17 July – Sir Simon Hornby, businessman (b. 1934)
- 18 July – Mary Brancker veterinary surgeon (b. 1914)
- 20 July
  - Iris Gower, writer (b. 1935)
  - Robin McLaren, diplomat (b. 1934)
- 21 July
  - Edna Healey, writer and filmmaker (b. 1918); wife of Denis Healey
  - Anthony Rolfe Johnson, opera singer (b. 1940)
- 24 July – Alex Higgins, snooker player (b. 1949)
- 26 July – Eric Hill, cricketer (b. 1923)
- 28 July – Ivy Bean, centenarian (b. 1905)
- 29 July – Carl Dooler, rugby league player (b. 1943)
- 31 July – John Gorst, politician (b. 1928)

=== August ===
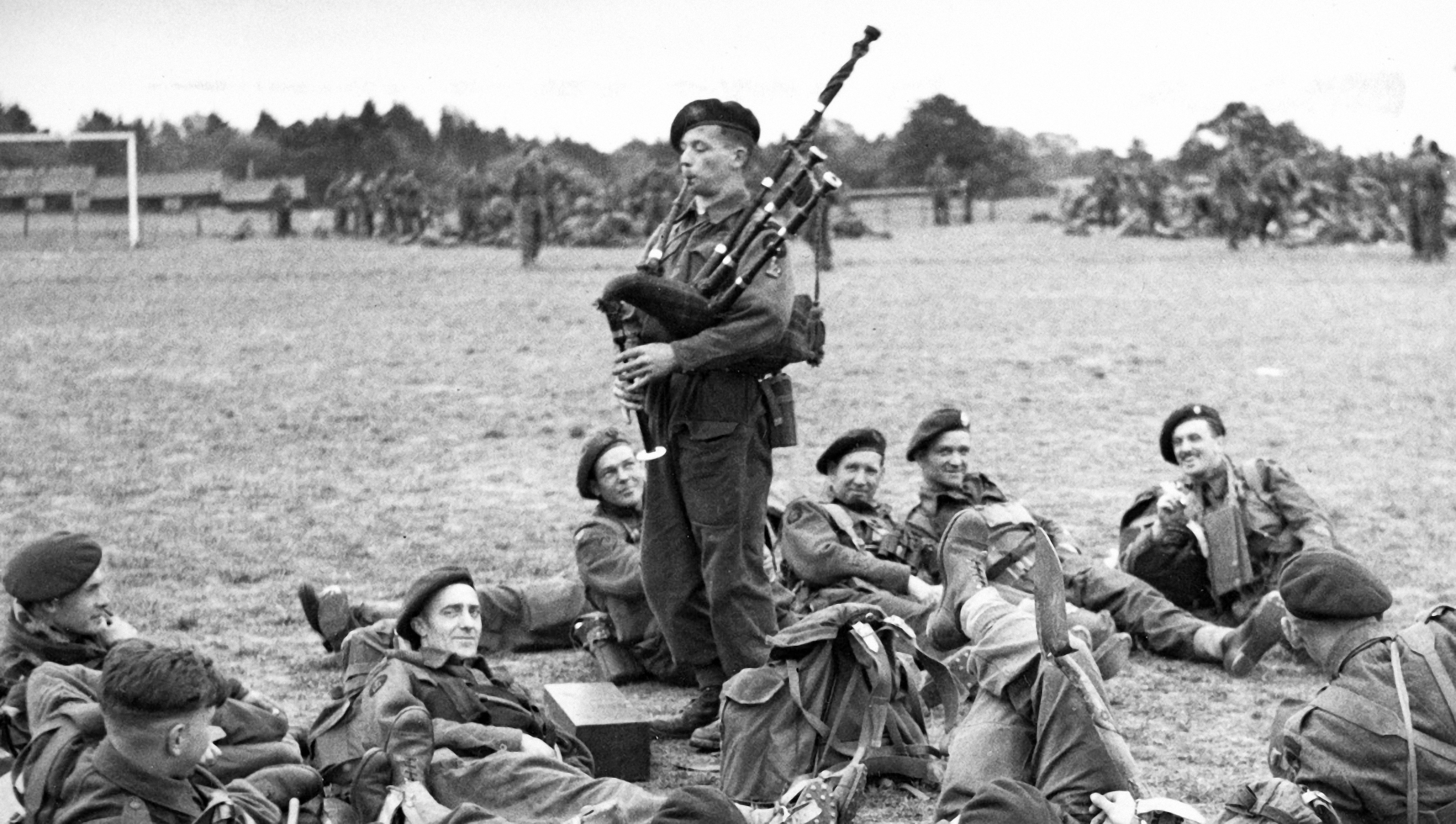
Bill Millin

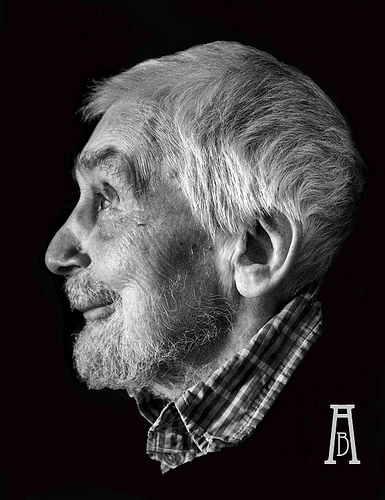
Edwin Morgan

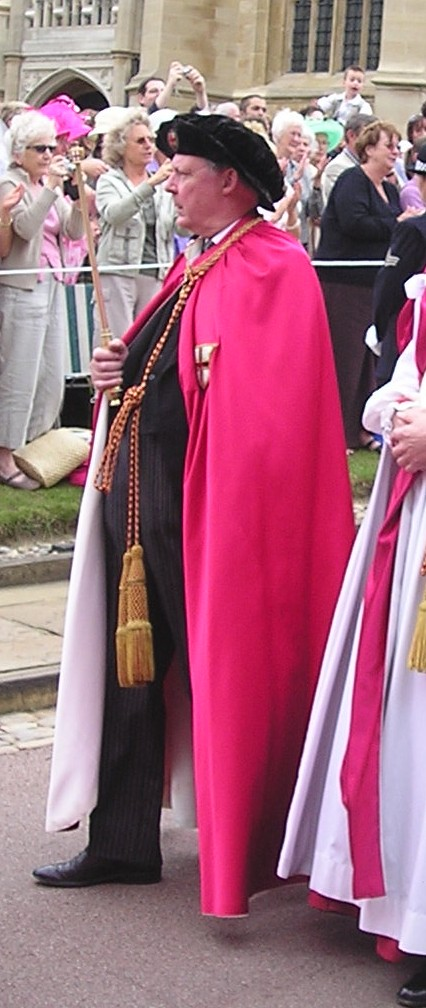
Peter Gwynn-Jones

- 3 August – James L. Gray, engineer (b. 1926)
- 6 August
  - Julian Besag, statistician (b. 1945)
  - Tony Judt, historian (b. 1948)
  - John Louis Mansi, actor (b. 1926)
- 7 August – John Nelder, statistician (b. 1924)
- 8 August
  - Alan Myers, translator (b. 1933)
  - Jack Parnell, musician and bandleader (b. 1923)
- 9 August – Robin Warwick Gibson, art historian (b. 1944)
- 10 August
  - Jimmy Reid, trade union activist (b. 1932)
  - Adam Stansfield, footballer (b. 1978)
- 11 August
  - Gretel Beer, cookery writer (b. 1921, Austria)
  - Geoffrey Johnson-Smith, politician (b. 1924)
  - James Mourilyan Tanner, paediatrician (b. 1920)
- 12 August
  - Laurence Gardner, author and lecturer (b. 1943)
  - Andrew Roth, biographer and journalist (b. 1919)
- 13 August
  - Albert Frost, businessman (b. 1914)
  - Edwin Newman, newscaster and journalist (b. 1919, USA)
- 14 August – Mervyn Alexander, Roman Catholic prelate (b. 1925)
- 15 August - Paul Briscoe, schoolteacher and writer (b. 1930)
- 16 August – Christopher Freeman, economist (b. 1921)
- 17 August
  - John Amyas Alexander, archaeologist (b. 1922)
  - Bill Millin, bagpiper at the D-Day Normandy landings (b. 1922)
  - Edwin Morgan, poet (b. 1920)
- 20 August – Carys Bannister, neurosurgeon (b. 1935)
- 21 August – Peter Gwynn-Jones, herald, Garter Principal King of Arms (b. 1940)
- 22 August
  - Raymond Hawkey, graphic designer (b. 1930)
  - Sir Donald Maitland, diplomat (b. 1922)
- 25 August – Andrew S. C. Ehrenberg, marketing scientist (b. 1926)
- 26 August – Bob Maitland, Olympic cyclist (b. 1924)
- 27 August
  - Corinne Day, fashion photographer (b. 1962)
  - Andrew McIntosh, Baron McIntosh of Haringey, politician and life peer (b. 1933)
  - Colin Tennant, 3rd Baron Glenconner, peer (b. 1926)
- 28 August
  - Keith Batey, World War II codebreaker (b. 1919)
  - John Freeborn, World War II air ace (b. 1919)
- 30 August
  - Owen Edwards, broadcaster (b. 1933)
  - Nicholas Lyell, Baron Lyell of Markyate, politician and life peer (b. 1938)
- 31 August
  - Vladimir Raitz, entrepreneur (b. 1922, Soviet Union)
  - Sid Rawle, campaigner (b. 1945)

=== September ===
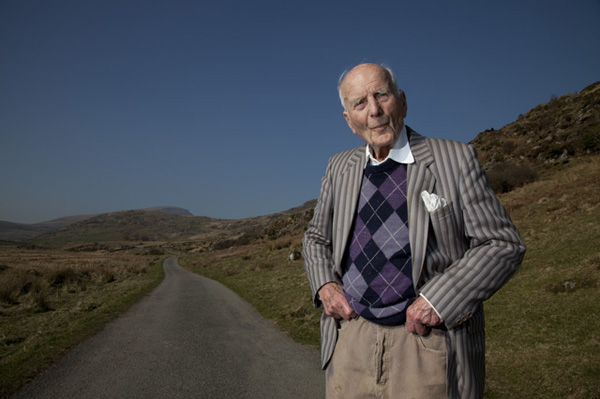
Micky Burn

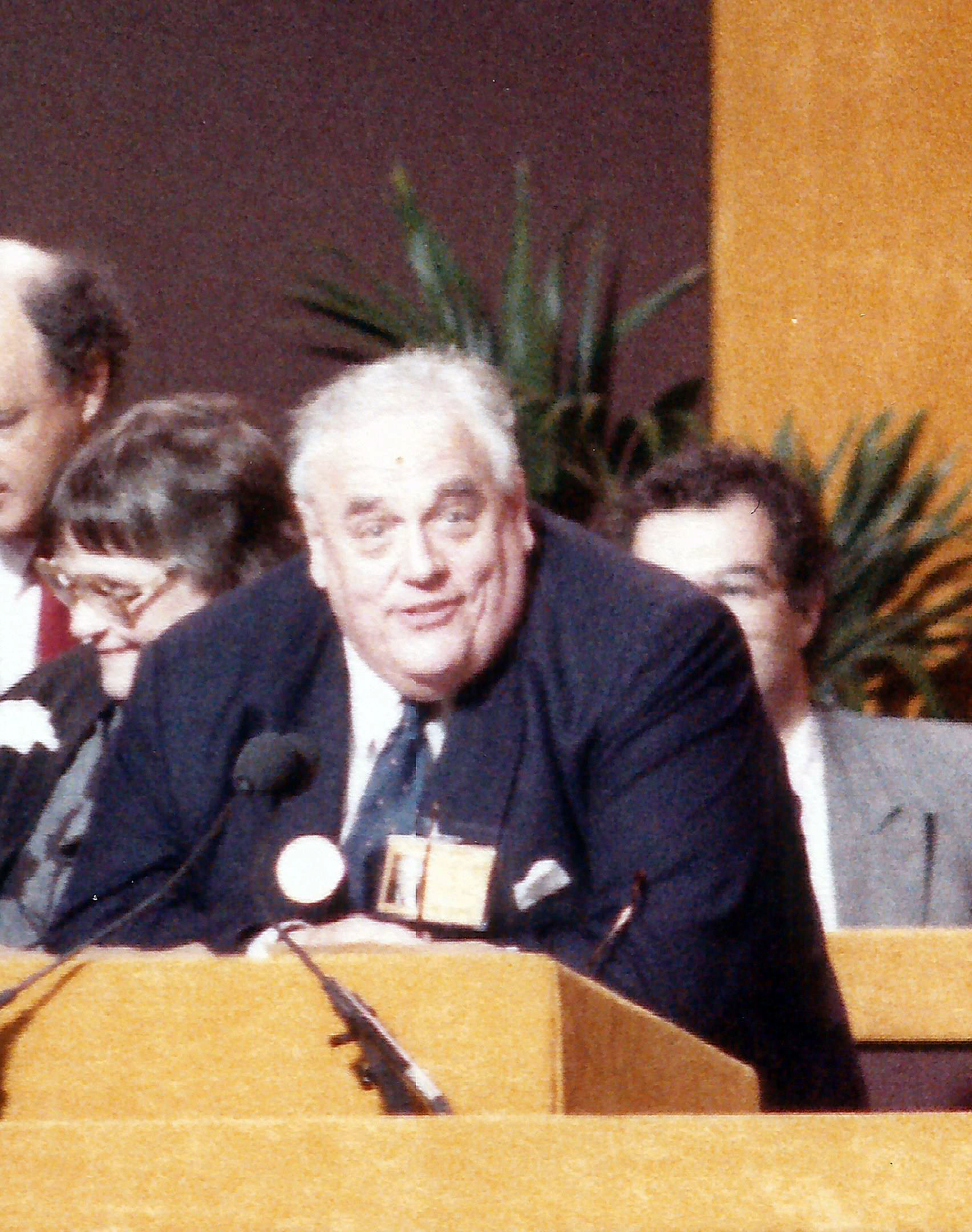
Sir Cyril Smith

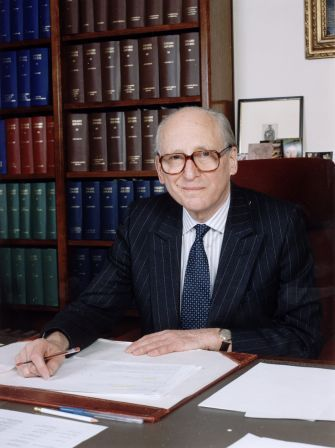
Tom Bingham, Baron Bingham of Cornhill

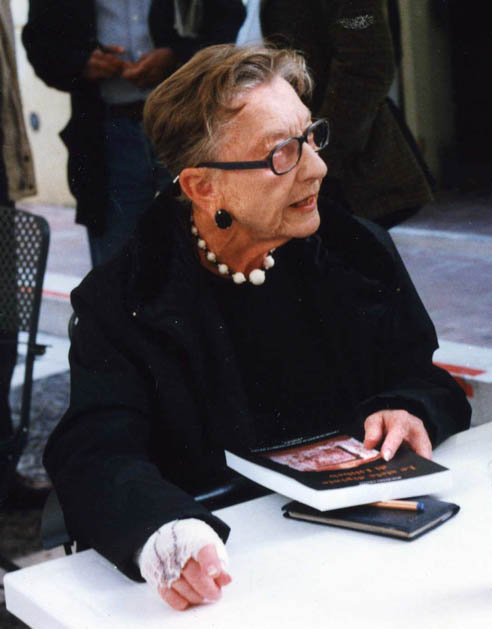
Honor Frost

- 1 September – Sir Colville Barclay, painter and botanist (b. 1913)
- 2 September – Jackie Sinclair, footballer (b. 1943)
- 3 September
  - Micky Burn, journalist and poet (b. 1912)
  - Sir Cyril Smith, politician (b. 1928)
- 4 September – John Gouriet, Army major and political campaigner (b. 1935)
- 5 September – Elizabeth Jenkins, author and biographer (b. 1905)
- 6 September – Clive Donner, film director (b. 1926)
- 10 September – Edwin Charles Tubb, science fiction writer (b. 1919)
- 11 September
  - Tom Bingham, Baron Bingham of Cornhill, judge (b. 1933)
  - Hugh Clark, Army officer (b. 1923)
- 12 September – Honor Frost, underwater archaeologist (b. 1917)
- 13 September
  - John Arundel Barnes, social anthropologist (b. 1918)
  - Stan Gooch, psychologist (b. 1932)
  - Jim Greenwood, rugby union player (b. 1928)
- 14 September
  - James Cleminson, soldier and businessman (b. 1921)
  - Nicholas Selby, actor (b. 1925)
- 15 September – Frank Jarvis, actor (b. 1941)
- 16 September – Jim Towers, footballer (b. 1933)
- 17 September
  - Robert Babington, politician (b. 1920)
  - Louis Marks, scriptwriter (b. 1928)
- 18 September – Bobby Smith, footballer (b. 1933)
- 19 September – Bob Crossley, artist (b. 1912)
- 21 September
  - Geoffrey Burgon, composer (b. 1941)
  - Maurice Line, librarian (b. 1928)
  - Don Partridge, singer-songwriter (b. 1941)
- 22 September
  - Bridget O'Connor, writer (b. 1961)
  - Alan Rudkin, boxer (b. 1941)
- 23 September – Catherine Walker, fashion designer (b. 1945, France)
- 24 September – Gilda O'Neill, writer and historian (b. 1951)
- 26 September
  - Johnny Edgecombe, jazz promoter (b. 1932, Antigua and Barbuda)
  - Jimi Heselden, entrepreneur (b. 1948)
  - Terry Newton, rugby league player (b. 1978)
- 27 September
  - Trevor Taylor, racing driver (b. 1936)
  - Frank Turner, Olympic gymnast (b. 1922)
- 28 September – Sir Trevor Holdsworth, businessman (b. 1927)
- 29 September – David Marques, rugby union player (b. 1932)
- 30 September – Sir Robert Mark, police officer (b. 1917)

=== October ===
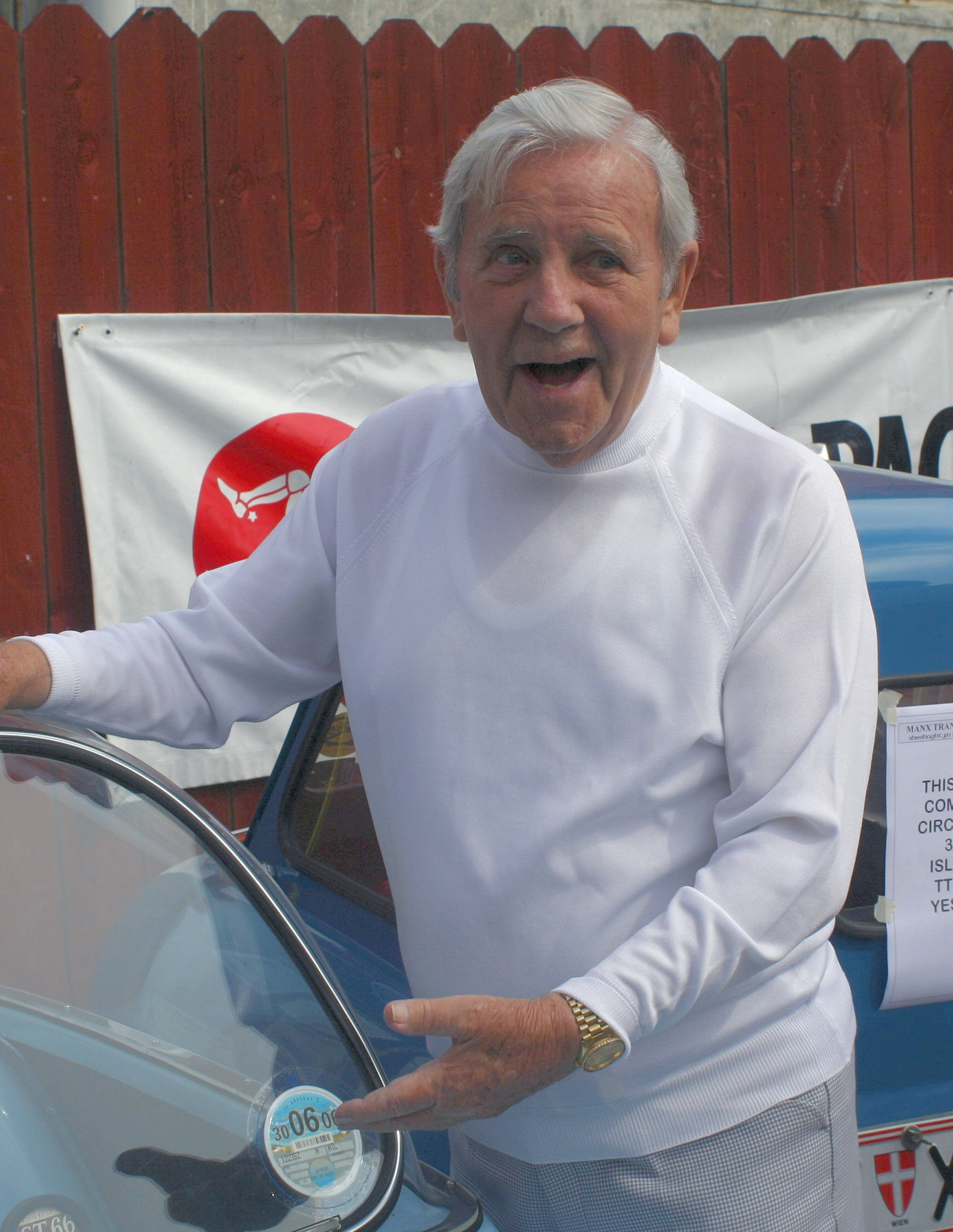
Sir Norman Wisdom

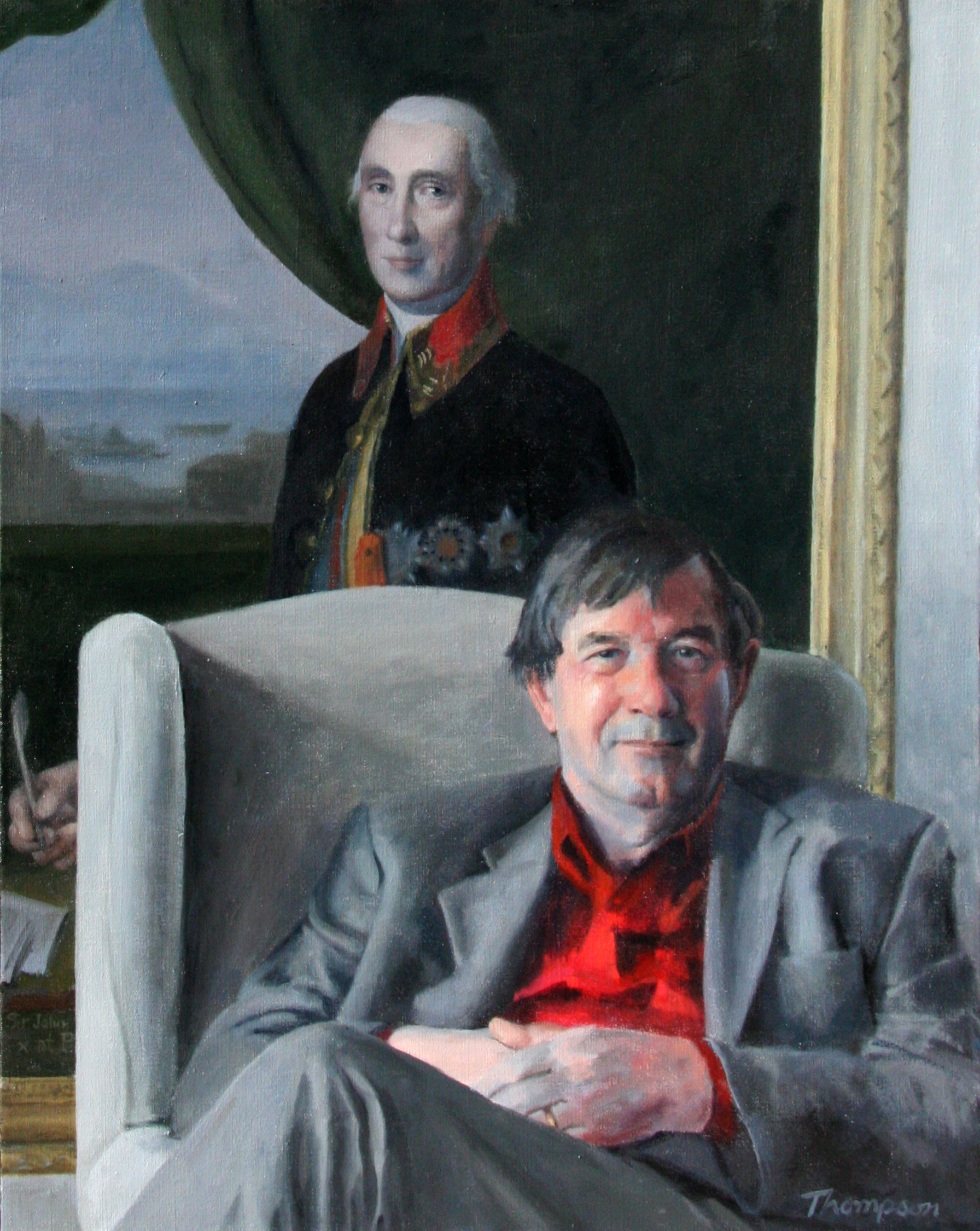
Richard Lyon-Dalberg-Acton, 4th Baron Acton

- 1 October
  - Ian Buxton, footballer and cricketer (b. 1938)
  - Lan Wright, science fiction writer (b. 1923)
- 2 October
  - Brenda Cowling, actress (b. 1925)
  - Sam Lesser, journalist and Spanish Civil War veteran (b. 1915)
  - Gillian Lowndes, ceramics sculptor (b. 1936)
- 3 October
  - Philippa Foot, philosopher (b. 1920); granddaughter of Grover Cleveland
  - Sir Louis Le Bailly, admiral and director-general of intelligence (b. 1915)
- 4 October
  - Gordon Lewis, aeronautical engineer (b. 1924)
  - Peter Warr, racing driver (b. 1938, Iran)
  - Sir Norman Wisdom, actor (b. 1915)
- 5 October
  - Roy Axe, car designer (b. 1937)
  - Roy Ward Baker, film director (b. 1916)
- 8 October
  - Reg King, singer-songwriter (b. 1945)
  - Linda Norgrove, aid worker (killed in Afghanistan) (b. 1974)
  - Neil Richardson, composer (b. 1930)
- 10 October
  - Les Gibbard, political cartoonist (b. 1945, New Zealand)
  - John Graysmark, production designer (b. 1935)
  - Richard Lyon-Dalberg-Acton, 4th Baron Acton, peer and politician (b. 1941)
  - Alison Stephens, mandolin player (b. 1970)
- 11 October – Claire Rayner, broadcaster and writer (b. 1931)
- 12 October – Austin Ardill, politician (b. 1917)
- 13 October
  - Eddie Baily, footballer (b. 1925)
  - Mary Malcolm, television journalist (b. 1918)
- 14 October – Simon MacCorkindale, actor (b. 1952)
- 15 October – Malcolm Allison, footballer and football manager (b. 1927)
- 18 October
  - David Fontana, psychologist (b. 1934)
  - Mel Hopkins, footballer (b. 1934)
- 19 October
  - Graham Crowden, actor (b. 1922)
  - John Waterlow, physiologist (b. 1916)
- 20 October
  - Eva Ibbotson, novelist (b. 1925)
  - D. Geraint James, doctor (b. 1922)
  - Robert Paynter, cinematographer (b. 1928)
  - Julian Roberts, librarian (b. 1930)
- 21 October – Howard Harry Rosenbrock, electrical engineer (b. 1920)
- 22 October – Bill Henderson, politician (b. 1924)
- 24 October – Andy Holmes, rower (b. 1959)
- 25 October – David Burgess, immigration lawyer (murdered) (b. 1947)
- 27 October – William Griffiths, field hockey player (b. 1922)
- 28 October
  - Robert Dickie, boxer (b. 1964)
  - Gerard Kelly, actor (b. 1959)
  - Maurice Murphy, trumpeter (b. 1935)
- 29 October
  - Ronnie Clayton, footballer (b. 1934)
  - Geoffrey Crawley, journalist and editor (b. 1926)
  - Mervyn Haisman, screenwriter (b. 1928)
- 30 October – John Benson, footballer (b. 1942)
- 31 October - Ted Sorensen, lawyer and politician (b. 1928)

=== November ===
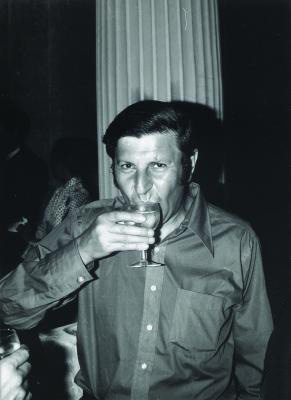
Peter Hilton

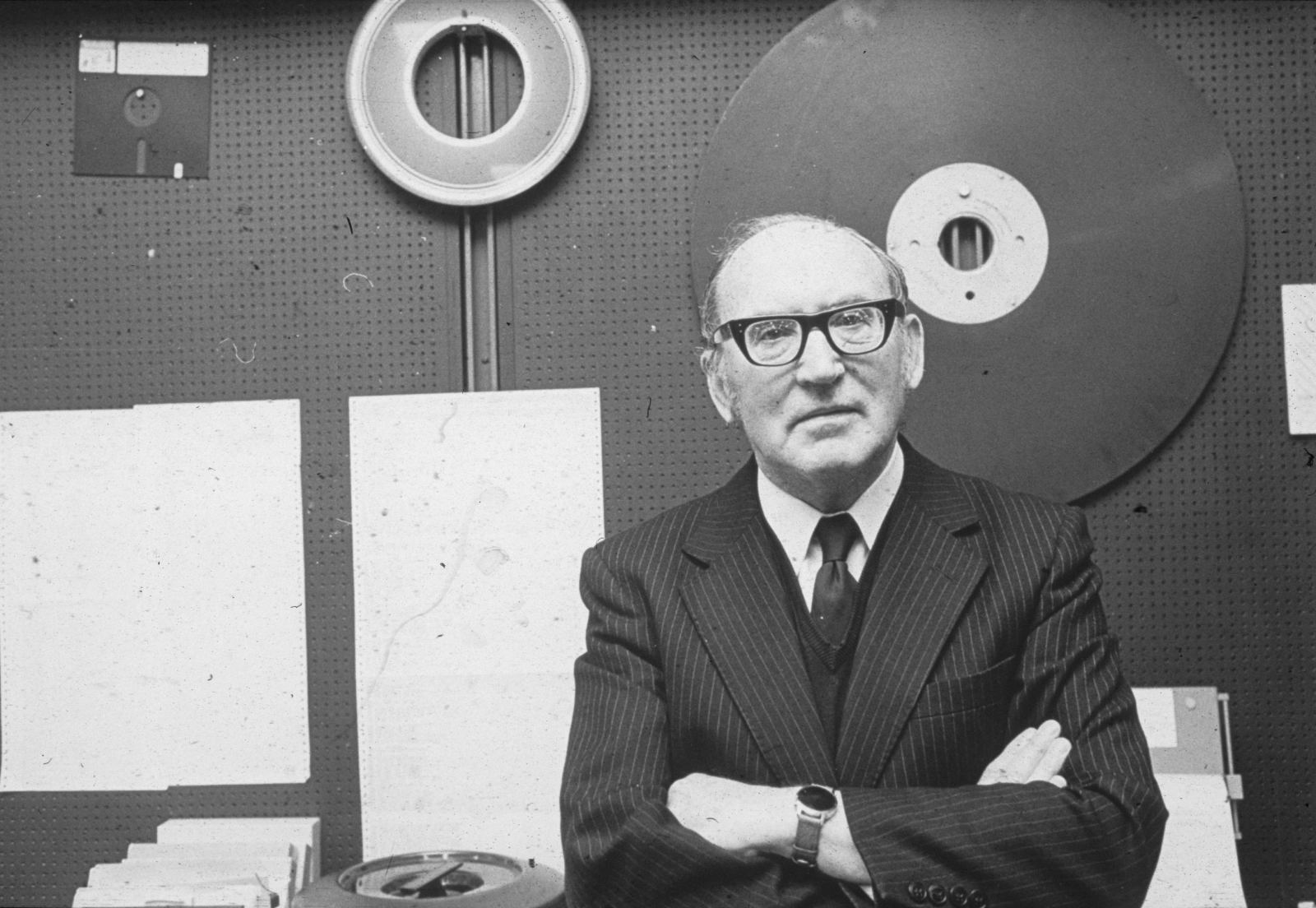
Sir Maurice Wilkes

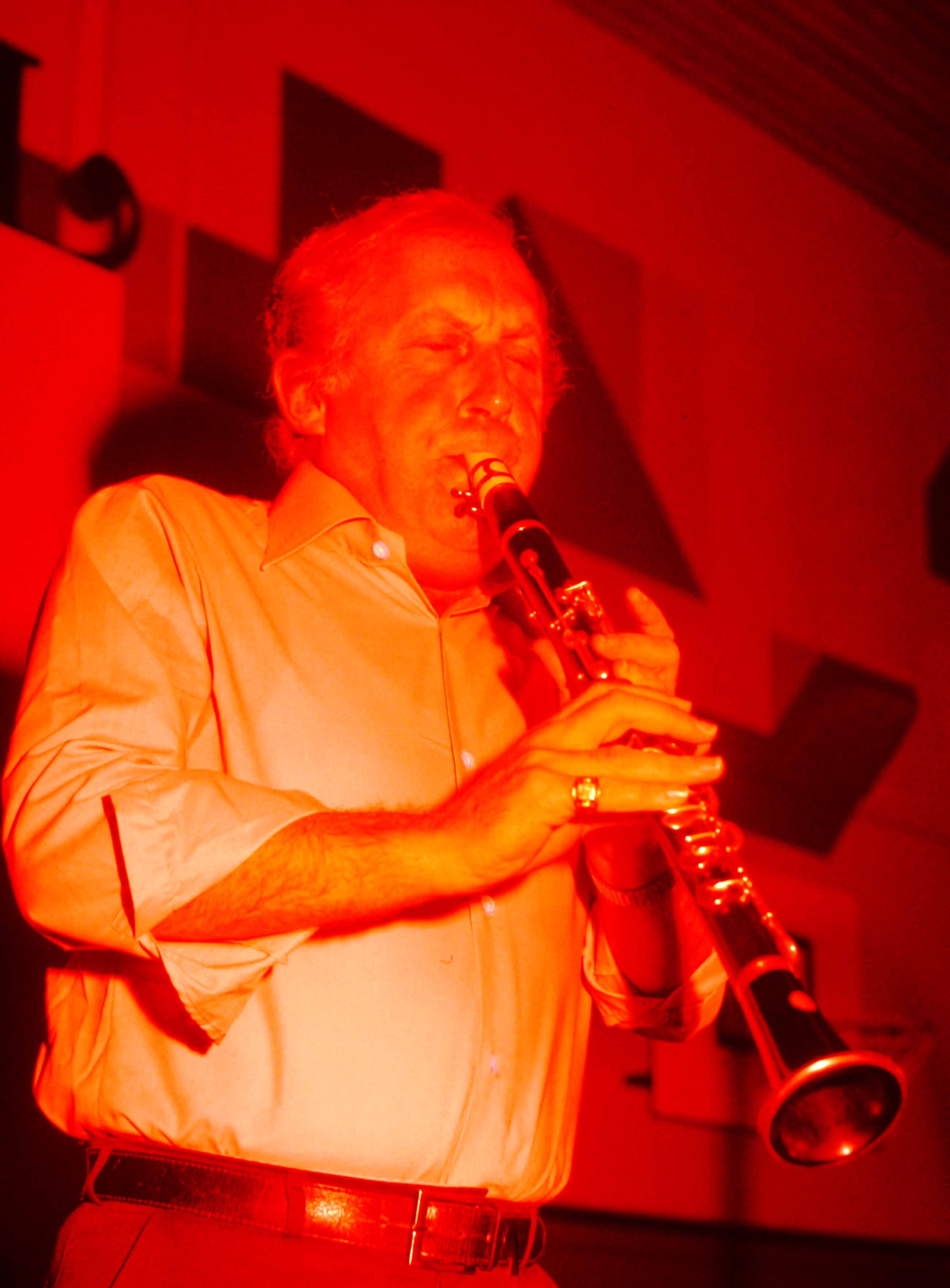
Monty Sunshine

- 1 November
  - Julia Clements, flower arranger and writer (b. 1906)
  - Diana Wellesley, Duchess of Wellington, World War II intelligence officer (b. 1922)
- 5 November
  - Rozsika Parker, psychotherapist and art historian (b. 1945)
  - Martin Starkie, actor (b. 1922)
- 6 November – Peter Hilton, mathematician, discoverer of Hilton's theorem (b. 1923)
- 7 November – Chris Goudge, Olympic athlete (b. 1935)
- 9 November
  - Elizabeth Carnegy, Baroness Carnegy of Lour, academic and life peer (b. 1925)
  - Robin Day, furniture designer (b. 1915)
- 10 November – Jim Farry, football executive (b. 1954)
- 13 November – Norman Dennis, sociologist (b. 1929)
- 14 November – Vince Broderick, cricketer (b. 1920)
- 18 November
  - Jim Cruickshank, footballer (b. 1941)
  - Brian G. Marsden, astronomer (b. 1937)
- 19 November – Byron Duckenfield, RAF fighter pilot and Battle of Britain veteran (b. 1917)
- 20 November – Jim Yardley, cricketer (b. 1946)
- 23 November
  - Joyce Howard, actress (b. 1932)
  - Ingrid Pitt, actress (b. 1937, Poland)
- 24 November – Michael Samuels, linguist (b. 1920)
- 25 November
  - Peter Christopherson, musician (b. 1955)
  - Bernard Matthews, businessman (b. 1930)
  - Colin Slee, Anglican prelate, Dean of Southwark Cathedral (b. 1945)
- 26 November – Gavin Blyth, producer (b. 1969)
- 29 November
  - David Fleming, environmental writer (b. 1940)
  - John Mantle, Scottish Episcopal bishop (b. 1946)
  - Sir Maurice Wilkes, computer scientist (b. 1913)
- 30 November
  - Robert Potter, church architect (b. 1909)
  - Monty Sunshine, clarinetist (b. 1928)

=== December ===
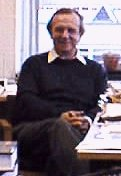
John E. Baldwin

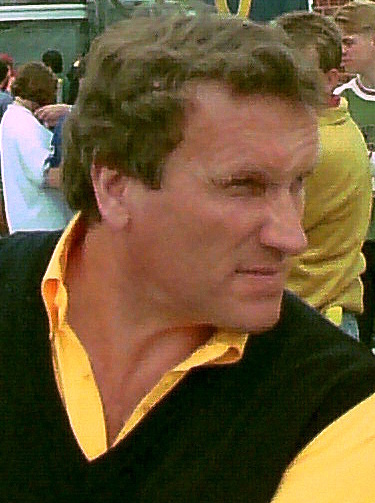
Tom Walkinshaw

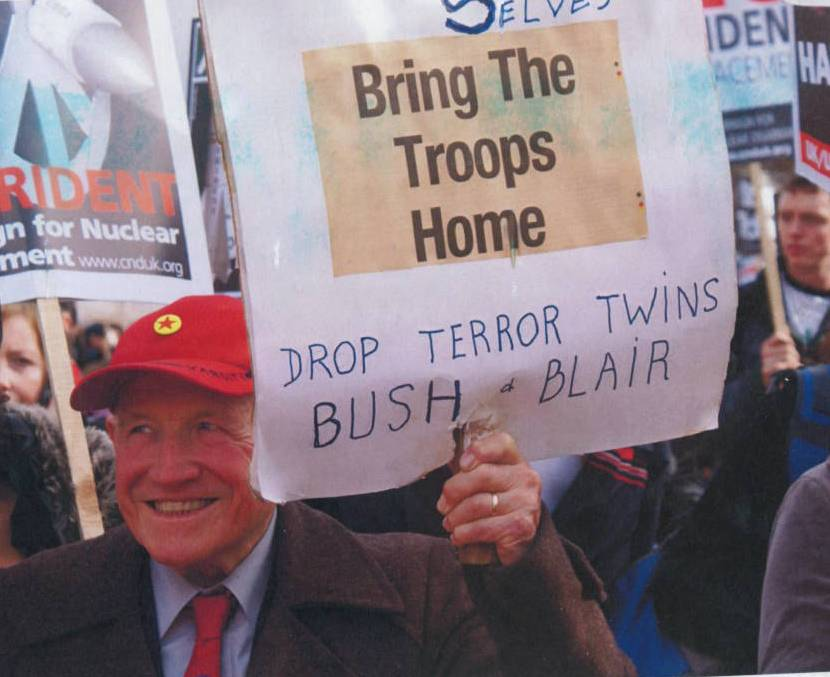
Bertie Lewis

- 3 December – Donald Pass, painter (b. 1930)
- 6 December – Tom Crowe, radio presenter (b. 1922, Ireland)
- 7 December
  - Peter Andry, record producer (b. 1927)
  - John E. Baldwin, astronomer (b. 1931)
- 8 December – Trev Thoms, guitarist (b. 1950)
- 12 December
  - Lachhiman Gurung VC, Gurkha soldier (b. 1917, Nepal)
  - Helen Roberts, actress and singer (b. 1912)
  - Tom Walkinshaw, racing driver and team owner (b. 1946)
- 14 December – Dale Roberts, footballer (b. 1986)
- 16 December – Richard Adeney, flautist (b. 1920)
- 17 December
  - Ralph Coates, footballer (b. 1946)
  - Dick Gibson, racing driver (b. 1918)
- 18 December
  - Gerard Mansell, BBC executive (b. 1921)
  - James Pickles, judge and tabloid columnist (b. 1925)
- 19 December
  - Anthony Howard, journalist and broadcaster (b. 1934)
  - Roy Romain, Olympic swimmer (b. 1918)
- 20 December
  - John Alldis, chorus-master and conductor (b. 1929)
  - Brian Hanrahan, journalist and broadcaster (b. 1949)
- 21 December
  - David Hennessy, 3rd Baron Windlesham, peer and politician (b. 1932)
  - Bertie Lewis, World War II airman and peace campaigner (b. 1920)
- 22 December
  - David Cockayne, physicist (b. 1942)
  - John Macreadie, trade unionist (b. 1946)
- 23 December – Jayaben Desai, trade union leader (b. 1933, India)
- 24 December – Elisabeth Beresford, author, creator of the Wombles (b. 1926)
- 25 December – Sir Iain Noble, banker and Gaelic activist (b. 1935)
- 26 December
  - Bill Jones, footballer (b. 1921)
  - Ian Samuel, RAF pilot and diplomat (b. 1915)
- 27 December
  - Keith Andrew, cricketer (b. 1929)
  - Maureen Lehane, opera singer and music festival founder (b. 1932)
  - David Aubrey Scott, diplomat (b. 1919)
- 28 December – Jeff Taylor, footballer (b. 1930)
- 30 December
  - Miranda Guinness, Countess of Iveagh, aristocrat (b. 1939)
  - Jenny Wood-Allen, runner, oldest woman to finish a marathon (b. 1911)

== See also ==
- 2010 in British music
- 2010 in British television
- List of British films of 2010
