= Donald Pass =

British painter (1930–2010)

Donald Pass (9 September 1930 – 3 December 2010) was a British painter whose art has been compared to that of William Blake by a reviewer in an Oxford newspaper, among others. He is known for work based on a vision he experienced, which has been interpreted as the Resurrection of the Dead. His work is found in museums and private collections in Europe, the United States, and Australia.

== Education ==
Donald Pass was educated at the Stoke-on-Trent Regional College of Art (1947–1950) and the Royal Academy Schools in London (1951–1954).

== Early Visions ==
At a young age, Donald Pass saw an angel with a lion's head at a roadside hedge. Later, while working in London as a painter, he saw through the window "a beautiful face which appeared to be all gold. It seemed to expand through the window and embrace the whole room."

== The Vision of the Resurrection ==
Prior to 1969, Donald Pass worked as a landscape artist. In a churchyard in Cuckfield, Sussex in August of that year, he experienced a vision which has been described as:

" It was eleven in the morning on a bright day but suddenly everything darkened, and a strange light appeared with a sound like the rushing of wind. Vast fields stretched before him in which he could see miles into the distance as if it were close by, and the sky was an infinite black space with great lights moving in it. He was standing with a host of figures and gradually, he became aware of angels standing with them and coming towards them the sky. The angels were descending and ascending, coming from all directions and in all sizes. Some had their faces obscured, some had very compassionate and beautiful faces, others had faces of lions like the angel he saw in the hedge when he was a child.

In the middle, an enormous angel descended with outstretched arms and a face which Donald Pass says he can not describe. His descent was accompanied by a tremendous chorus of sound. Higher and at a distance was a beautiful and strange face in profile that had long hair yet was neither male nor female. It seemed unaware of the figures below. All the light stemmed from that extraordinary head and from the angels. It was a strange light and unlike sunlight, it spread in such a way that all the figures were illuminated.

On the ground, figures lay still with forms rising out of them as if something was emerging from a chrysalis. Donald Pass remembers that it looked "almost like a transfiguration, a rebirth" of the soul from the body. There were figures standing, and others going in three directions: one towards very dark angels who stood near the horizon and others upward in great columns into the sky where angels gathered them in. The dark angels stood very still a long way away, but those closer seemed to gather figures towards them. There were gangs of angels standing together, figures grouping together, and figures which Donald Pass say he can't describe standing together. There seemed at one point to be hands rising from the ground."

His subsequent work has been based on the vision.

== Interviews ==
Donald Pass Interview for Xan Phillips Podcast Listen.
