= Ivy Bean =

British internet personality

- Born: Ivy Lesly Asquith; 8 September 1905; Bradford, West Riding of Yorkshire, England
- Died: 28 July 2010 (aged 104); Bradford, West Riding of Yorkshire, England
- Years active: 2008–2010
- Known for: Oldest person on Twitter and one of the oldest on Facebook; Centenarian
- Spouse: Harold Bean (m. 1942; died 1981)
- Children: 1

Ivy Lesly Bean (née Asquith; 8 September 1905 – 28 July 2010) was a British internet personality, known for being the oldest person in the world on Twitter and one of the oldest users of Facebook.

Bean earned the title of "Oldest Twitter User Ever" from Guinness World Records at the age of 104 years and 324 days.

== Early life ==
Ivy Asquith was born in Bradford, then in the West Riding of Yorkshire, as one of seven children. She went to school at James Street School in Thornton and left at 14 to go and work at the Prospect Mill. During her time at the mill, she worked in spinning and then in the winding department. She later married Harold Bean, a soldier in the Royal Army Service Corps who briefly served in North Africa. After Harold left the army, he and Ivy went to work in service for Lord and Lady Guinness at Greens Norton Hall in Northampton. It was during their time there that they had their only daughter, Sandra.

After several years in Bedford, the family returned to Bradford, and Bean began working for Arthur Crossland, a local mill owner. She had worked for Crossland for about 18 years when he died, and she decided it was time to retire. A few months later, she began working for her former boss's daughter. Several years after this, Bean retired for the second time, aged 73, a little while after her husband Harold had died at the age of 75. Ivy would remain on her own until the age of 92, when she moved into a residential home. She remained there for ten years, until the home closed down, and she moved into another care facility a week before her 102nd birthday.

== Later years and fame ==
In 2007, Ivy Bean first accessed the internet via a computer given to her care home by social services. In 2008, at the age of 102, Bean joined Facebook, making her one of its oldest members. An inspiration to other residents, she quickly became more widely known, and several fan pages were made in her honour. Bean discussed her life in a care home, her favourite meal, and episodes of Deal or No Deal she had seen.

Singer Peter Andre had a private meeting with Bean in September 2009 while in Bradford for a book signing. She visited Prime Minister Gordon Brown and his wife Sarah in Downing Street early in 2010. Some time after creating her Facebook page, Bean also joined Twitter, when she had surpassed the maximum number of friends allowed by Facebook at the time. When Bean died, she had 4,962 friends on Facebook and more than 56,000 followers on Twitter. It is believed that her Facebook account is disabled.

== Illness and death ==
In early July 2010, staff at Bean's care home reported on her Twitter account that she had been admitted to hospital, but that she was in good spirits and would be back online as soon as her health allowed. A week later it was reported that she was suffering from liver failure. On 23 July, Bean returned home, but her condition worsened, and at 12:08 am on 28 July, she died at the age of 104. Her admirers Stephen Fry and Graham Linehan were reported to be saddened by the news.

== Family ==
Bean married Harold Bean in Bradford in 1942. She remained with him until his death in 1981, and did not remarry. She had a daughter, Sandra, who survived her, as well as two grandchildren and three great-grandchildren.
