= Jack Harrison (RAF officer) =

Scottish educator and military pilot

- Jack Harrison
- Born: Jack Harrison; 18 December 1912
- Died: 4 June 2010 (aged 97)
- Occupation: RAF pilot
- Years active: 1942–1945

Jack Harrison (18 December 1912 – 4 June 2010) was a Scottish educator, military pilot, and prisoner of war during World War II. Harrison was one of the last known survivors of the Stalag Luft III Great Escape. Stalag Luft III was a Luftwaffe run prisoner of war camp in Silesia (modern-day Poland).

== The Great Escape ==
Harrison was a prisoner at Stalag Luft III during World War II. As an RAF pilot he took part in the planning of "The Great Escape" from Stalag Luft III. Harrison never made it out of the camp because the escape attempt was discovered before he could get in the tunnel. There were 76 prisoners who made the escape in March 1944. Most were recaptured and 50 were executed.

== Personal ==
Harrison was born on 18 December 1912. On the eve of World War II, Harrison was a Latin teacher at Dornoch Academy in Sutherland. He enlisted in the Royal Air Force as a pilot once war with Nazi Germany broke out.
