= Leonard Hemming =

English cricketer

Personal information
- Full name: Leonard Ernest Gerald Hemming
- Born: 30 September 1916; Enfield Town, Middlesex, England
- Died: 10 July 2010 (aged 93); Oxford, Oxfordshire, England
- Batting: Right-handed
- Bowling: Right-arm off break

Domestic team information
- Years: Team
- 1946–1954: Oxfordshire
- 1951: Minor Counties

Career statistics
Competition	First-class
Matches	1
Runs scored	28
Batting average	14.00
100s/50s	0/0
Top score	14
Balls bowled	138
Wickets	1
Bowling average	60.00
5 wickets in innings	0
10 wickets in match	0
Best bowling	1/60
Catches/stumpings	0/–
- Source: Cricinfo, 10 July 2012

Leonard Ernest Gerald Hemming (30 September 1916 – 10 July 2010) was an English cricketer. Hemming was a right-handed batsman who bowled right-arm off break. He was born at Enfield Town, Middlesex.

Early in his life he emigrated to Australia with his parents, before returning to England in the mid–1930s. Hemming made his debut for Oxfordshire against Berkshire in the 1946 Minor Counties Championship. He played minor counties cricket for Oxfordshire from 1946 to 1954, making 42 appearances, the last of which came against Cornwall in the 1954 Minor Counties Championship. Playing minor counties cricket for Oxfordshire allowed Hemming to represent the combined Minor Counties cricket team, who he made a single first-class appearance for against Kent in 1951 at the St Lawrence Ground, Canterbury. Kent batted first and made 365/8 declared, with Hemming taking the wicket of Brian Edrich, to finish with figures of 1/60 from 23 overs. The Minor Counties responded in their first-innings by making 169 all out, with Hemming being dismissed by Ted Witherden for 14 runs. Forced to follow-on in their second-innings, where they were dismissed for 186, with Hemming himself 14 runs before he was dismissed by Edrich.

Outside of cricket, he worked as a sales manager for Witney blanket factory Early’s. He was awarded the Queen's Silver Jubilee Medal in 1977. He died at the Sobell House Hospice in Oxford, Oxfordshire, on 10 July 2010.
