= Sinfonia Newydd =

Sinfonia Newydd (SN)
- Orchestra
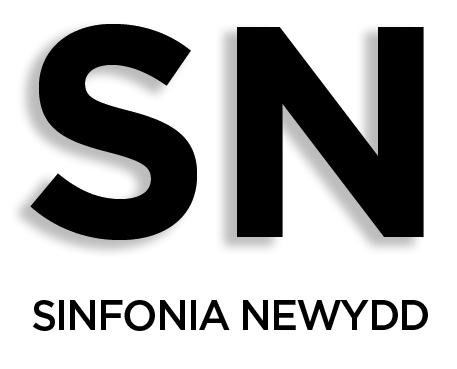
- Short name: SN
- Founded: 2010
- Location: Cardiff, Wales, UK

Sinfonia Newydd (English: New Sinfonia), often referred to simply as SN, is a contemporary arts company, based in Cardiff. The company, a finalist of the Future Entrepreneur Award at the Wales Quality Awards 2011, specialises in innovating ways of delivering art, particularly music, of students in Wales. Sinfonia Newydd is currently based at the Royal Welsh College of Music & Drama.

== History ==
Sinfonia Newydd was founded in February 2010 by Toks Dada. It consisted of a 22-piece string ensemble to provide a platform for composition students at the Royal Welsh College of Music & Drama to have their works premiered. Soon after, the Repertory by Entrepreneurial Performers Company (REPCo) – a funding initiative for student-led projects – was formed, of which SN became a founding member.

Seeking to innovate collaboration between art mediums, SN integrated scenic art into their concert in December 2010 at the Welsh National Temple of Peace and Health by creating live on-stage art pieces inspired by the music being performed.

In June 2011, Sinfonia Newydd founder and director Toks Dada won the RWCMD Young Entrepreneur of the Year award and the company subsequently became a finalist in the Wales Future Entrepreneur Awards at the Wales Quality Awards 2011.

At present Sinfonia Newydd have produced a total of 68 performances of contemporary music including 56 world premieres and have grown to an ensemble consisting of 58 players across all orchestral families.

== Projects ==
=== Sinfonia Newydd Chamber Series ===
Sinfonia Newydd Chamber Series was launched in October 2010 as a branch of SN with the aim of producing monthly chamber music events in Cardiff. In November 2011, Sinfonia Newydd Chamber Series produced a concert entitled "An Exhibition", at the Contemporary Art Gallery of National Museum Cardiff, where works inspired by the museum's contemporary art pieces were performed. Other Chamber Series venues have included the Weston Gallery, RWCMD and the Glanfa Stage, Wales Millennium Centre.

=== Sinfonia Newydd Festival ===
Sinfonia Newydd Festival is an annual contemporary arts festival which was launched in June 2011 at the Royal Welsh College of Music & Drama, with the Sinfonia Newydd Ensemble becoming one of the first orchestras to perform in the Dora Stoutzker Hall. The Sinfonia Newydd 2011 Festival consisted of 8 individual events featuring 40 world premiere works by 22 Welsh-based student composers. Alongside this, SN showcased contemporary art pieces created by theatre design students at the college which were inspired by some of the works programmed in the final evening concert of the festival.

=== SN Jazz ===
SN Jazz, a branch of SN with the aim of promoting and premiering contemporary jazz music, was launched in November 2011 as part of a contemporary chamber music double-bill, consisting of a "fusion of contemporary jazz and classical music" performed on the Glanfa Stage, Wales Millennium Centre.
