= Kids Run Free =

British charity organization

- Founded: 2010
- Founder: Martine Verweij and Catherine O'Carroll
- Type: Youth and Sport Charity
- Location: Leamington Spa
- Region served: United Kingdom
- Website: www.kidsrunfree.co.uk

Kids Run Free is a British charity organization based in Warwickshire founded by Martine Verweij and Catherine O'Carroll in December 2010.

== Events ==
Kids Run Free organizes free, regular running events for children, of all ages. The children's abilities to be a part of the schools program, is as follows. Marathon Kids. The first Kids Run Free event was held in Solihull in May 2011. Other locations were launched in Leamington Spa in July 2011, Coventry in April 2012, and Birmingham in May 2012.

== Patrons ==
Since March 2012 former Olympic athlete David Moorcroft has served as a patron for Kids Run Free. Moorcroft is actively involved with Kids Run Free events and was present at the launch of the charity's Coventry race location.

== Mascot ==
The Kids Run Free mascot was named following a competition held by the charity in February 2012. The competition winners chose to name the mascot 'Dash'.

== Partnerships ==
Kids Run Free works in partnership with its sister organisation, Raceways. Raceways is a multisport event management company committed to organising races for adults. The proceeds from Raceways events are donated to Kids Run Free.
