= Premiership of Margaret Thatcher =

Period of the Government of the United Kingdom from 1979 to 1990

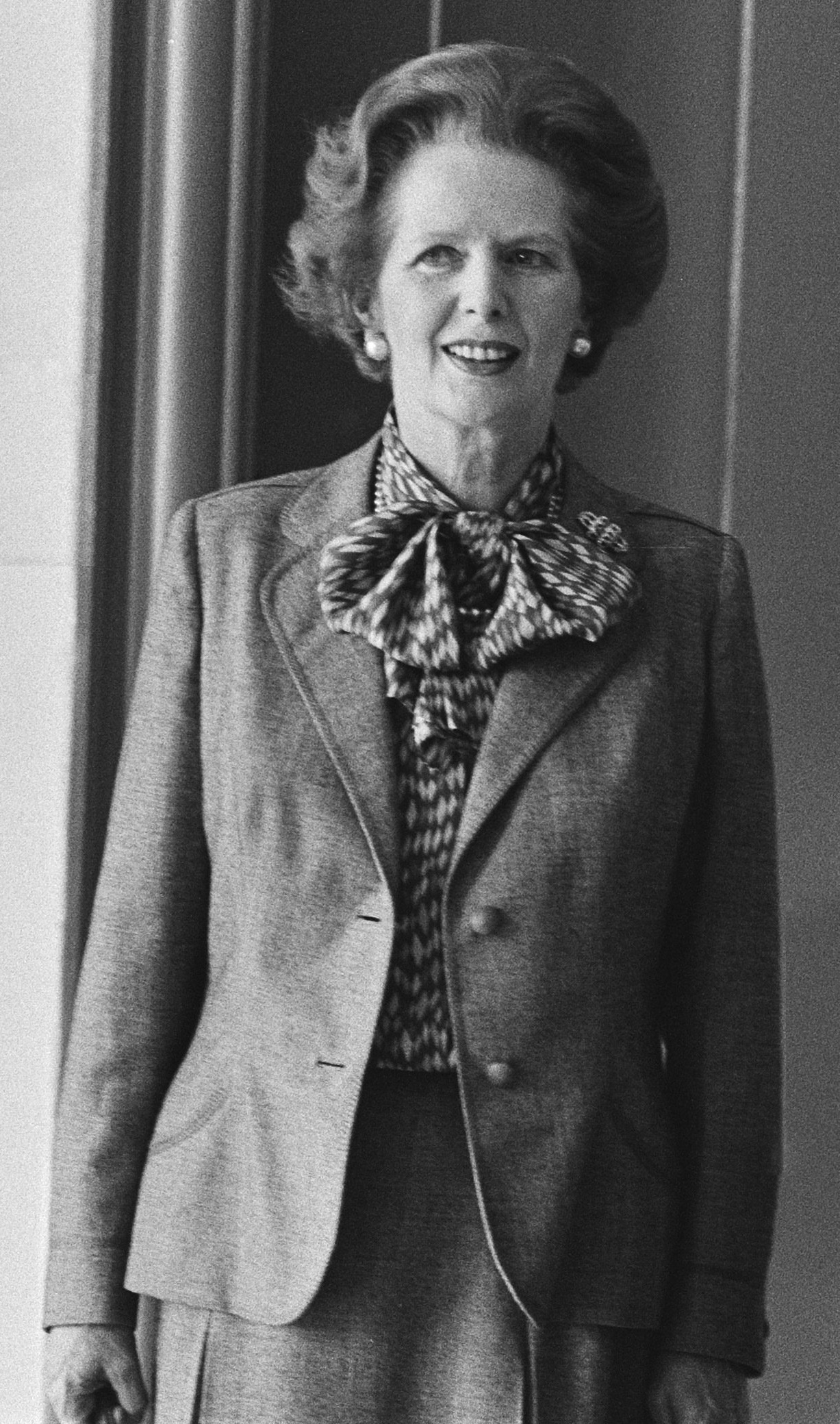
- Thatcher in 1983
- Premiership of Margaret Thatcher; 4 May 1979 – 28 November 1990
- Monarch: Elizabeth II
- Cabinet: First Thatcher ministry; Second Thatcher ministry; Third Thatcher ministry
- Party: Conservative
- Election: 1979; 1983; 1987
- Seat: 10 Downing Street
- Coat of Arms of HM Government

Margaret Thatcher's tenure as Prime Minister of the United Kingdom began on 4 May 1979 when she accepted an invitation from Queen Elizabeth II to form a government, succeeding James Callaghan of the Labour Party, and ended on 28 November 1990 upon her resignation. Thatcher, who had been Leader of the Conservative Party since her election in 1975, had led the Conservative Party to victory at the 1979 general election, and won landslide re-elections for the party in 1983 and in 1987. She was the longest-serving British prime minister of the 20th century and the first woman to hold the office. As prime minister Thatcher also served simultaneously as First Lord of the Treasury and Minister for the Civil Service.

In domestic policy Thatcher implemented sweeping reforms concerning the affairs of the economy, eventually including the privatisation of most nationalised industries, and the weakening of trade unions. She emphasised reducing the government's role and letting the marketplace decide in terms of the neoliberal ideas pioneered by the economists Milton Friedman and Friedrich Hayek, promoted by her mentor Keith Joseph, and promulgated by the media as Thatcherism. In foreign policy Thatcher decisively defeated Argentina in the Falklands War in 1982, and worked with the United States president Ronald Reagan to actively oppose Soviet communism during the Cold War, but also promoted collaboration with the Soviet leader Mikhail Gorbachev in ending the Cold War.

In the first years of her premiership, she had a deeply divided cabinet. As the leader of the "dry" faction in the party, she purged most of the one-nation "wet" Conservatives and took full control. However, by the late 1980s she had alienated several senior members of her Cabinet with her opposition to greater economic integration into the European Economic Community, which she argued would lead to a federalist Europe and surrender Britain's ability to self-govern. She also alienated many Conservative voters and parliamentarians with the imposition of a local poll tax. As her support ebbed away, she was challenged for her leadership in 1990 and persuaded by her Cabinet to withdraw from the second round of voting, ending her eleven-year premiership. She was succeeded by John Major, her Chancellor of the Exchequer.

== First term (May 1979 – June 1983) ==
Composition of the House of Commons after the election

Thatcher was Britain and Europe's first female prime minister. (Note: For an overview, see Sked & Cook (1993:329–439).) She appointed few women to high office and did not make women's issues a priority, but her pioneering election was widely hailed as an achievement for women in general.

=== Royalty tensions ===
Thatcher, having to share the media spotlight with Queen Elizabeth II and Diana, Princess of Wales, (Note: Biographer Ben Pimlott (1996:460–463, 475–479, 484, 509–513) wrote that the Queen almost faded into the background between the two media stars.) increasingly assumed regal poses, such as taking the salute at the victory parade after the Falklands War, and becoming the centre of attraction on foreign visits. Tensions between them were kept hidden until 1986, when the Sunday Times reported on the Queen's alleged criticism of Thatcher's policies, especially regarding the people of the Commonwealth, as "uncaring, confrontational and socially divisive." Thatcher often ridiculed the Commonwealth, which the Queen held in very high esteem.

=== Economic affairs ===
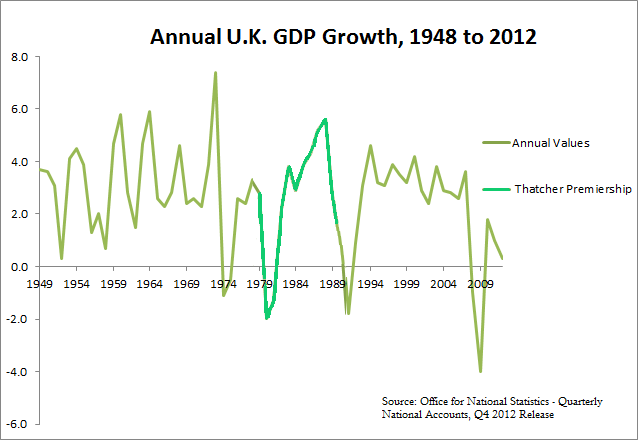
Annual UK GDP growth with the economic turnaround in the 1980s highlighted in light green

Biographer John Campbell reports that in July 1978, before Thatcher became prime minister, when asked by a Labour MP in the Commons what she meant by socialism:

[S]he was at a loss to reply. What in fact she meant was Government support for inefficient industries, punitive taxation, regulation of the labour market, price controls – everything that interfered with the functioning of the free economy.

==== Deflationary strategy ====
Under Thatcher's government, the taming of inflation displaced high employment as the primary policy objective.

As a monetarist, Thatcher started out in her economic policy by increasing interest rates to slow the growth of the money supply and thus lower inflation. She had a preference for indirect taxation over taxes on income, and value-added tax (VAT) was raised sharply to 15%, with a resultant actual short-term rise in inflation. (Note: Following the introduction of the 15% VAT rate on 18 June 1979, inflation rose from 11.4% in June to 15.6% in July, reaching a high of 21.9% in May 1980.) The fiscal and monetary squeeze, combined with the North Sea oil effect, appreciated the real exchange rate. These moves hit businesses—especially the manufacturing sector—and unemployment exceeded 2 million by the autumn of 1980, up from 1.5 million at the time of Thatcher's election just over a year earlier.

Political commentators harked back to the "U-turn" of Edward Heath's government and speculated that Thatcher would follow suit, but she repudiated this approach at the 1980 Conservative Party conference, telling the party: "To those waiting with bated breath for that favourite media catchphrase, the U-turn, I have only one thing to say: You turn if you want to. The lady's not for turning". That she meant what she said was confirmed in the 1981 budget, when, despite concerns expressed in an open letter from 364 leading economists, taxes were increased in the middle of a recession, leading to newspaper headlines the following morning of "Howe it Hurts", a reference to the chancellor Geoffrey Howe.

==== Unemployment ====
In 1981, as unemployment soared (exceeding 2.5 million by the summer and heading towards 3 million before Christmas) and the Government's popularity plunged, the party chairman, Lord Thorneycroft, and two cabinet ministers, Lord Carrington and Humphrey Atkins, confronted the prime minister and suggested she should resign; according to her adviser, Tim Bell, "Margaret just told them to go away". Thatcher's key ally in the party was Home Secretary, and later Deputy Prime Minister, William Whitelaw. His moral authority and support allowed her to resist the internal threat from the "Heathite" wets.

Following the Brixton riot in South London in April 1981, employment secretary Norman Tebbit, responding to a suggestion that rioting was caused by unemployment, observed that the unemployment of the 1930s was far worse than that of the 1980s—and that his father's generation never reacted by rioting. "I grew up in the 1930s with an unemployed father", Tebbit said. "He did not riot. He got on his bike and looked for work, and he went on looking until he found it."

Over two million manufacturing jobs were ultimately lost in the recession of 1979–81. This labour-shedding helped firms deal with long-standing X-inefficiency from over-manning, enabling the British economy to catch up to the productivity levels of other advanced capitalist countries.

The link between the money supply and inflation was proven accurate, and by January 1982, the inflation rate had dropped back to 8.6% from earlier highs of 18%. Interest rates were then allowed to fall. Unemployment continued to rise, passing 3 million by January 1982 and remaining this high until early 1987. However, Tebbit later suggested that, due to the high number of people claiming unemployment benefit while working, unemployment never reached three million.

By 1983, manufacturing output had dropped by 30% from 1978, although economic growth had been re-established the previous year. The productivity turnaround from labour-shedding proved to be a one-off and was not matched by growth in output. The industrial base was so reduced that thereafter the balance of payments in manufactured goods was in deficit. Chancellor Nigel Lawson told the Lords' Select Committee on Overseas Trade: "There is no adamantine law that says we have to produce as much in the way of manufactures as we consume. If it does turn out that we are relatively more efficient in world terms at providing services than at producing goods, then our national interest lies in a surplus on services and a deficit on goods."

==== Defence spending ====
In her first six months as prime minister, Thatcher repeatedly prioritised defence spending over economic policy and financial control. However, in 1980, she reversed this priority and tried to cut the defence budget. The 1981 Defence Review by John Nott, the defence minister, dramatically cut the capabilities of the Royal Navy's surface fleet. She replaced Francis Pym as defence secretary because he wanted more funding. The cuts were cancelled when the ships destined for cuts proved essential in the Falklands War.

==== Housing and urban enterprise ====
One of Thatcher's largest and most successful policies assisted council tenants in public housing to purchase their homes at favourable rates. The "Right to Buy" had emerged in the late 1940s, but was too great a challenge to the post-war consensus to win Conservative endorsement. Thatcher from her earliest days in politics favoured the idea because it would lead to a "property-owning democracy". By the 1970s, many working-class people had ample incomes for home ownership, and eagerly accepted Thatcher's invitation to purchase their homes at a sizeable discount. The new owners were more likely to vote Conservative, as Thatcher had hoped. The downside to this was that it eventually led to council house shortages, as the share of the money from the sale of the houses to be used to construct more council properties gradually fell by the end of the 1980s, and saw fewer councils building affordable housing.

To deal with economic stagnation in the inner cities, the Government introduced "enterprise zones" starting in 1981; the idea began in Britain and was adopted by the United States and some EU countries. It targeted designated small, economically depressed neighbourhoods and exempted them from some regulations and taxes. The goal was to attract private capital and new business activity that would bring jobs and progress to declining areas. Important projects included those in London Docklands, Salford and Gateshead.

=== Social security ===
Various changes to the social security system were undertaken during the course of Thatcher's premiership. Reductions were made in the amount of payable benefit to occupational pension holders over the age of 60 and a tightening of eligibility rules regarding periods of employment interruption was carried out. The Social Security Act (No. 1) 1980 removed an existing obligation to increase benefits in line with either wages or prices, whichever was better. Instead, the new obligation was for benefits to up only with prices. Under the same Act, long-term disability benefit and short-term benefits (such as for unemployment and sickness) could, as noted by one study, "be uprated up to 5 percentage points less than was otherwise required". In addition, the number of incapacitated days before entitlements to sickness benefit could be acquired was raised to four. The 1980 Education Act largely abolished, according to one study, "the requirement on local authorities to provide free school milk and meals".

The Social Security Act (No. 2) 1980 restricted benefit access for the families of strikers, and (especially for young people) tightened unemployment benefit eligibility. The Act also brought short-term benefits into tax and abolished earnings-related supplements for all short-term benefits, which included maternity and widow's allowance, and unemployment and sickness benefit. In July 1982, sickness and unemployment benefits became taxable, and new Department of Health and Social Security regulations were introduced in 1983 limiting access to certain housing payments for the under-25s. The Social Security Act of 1986 extended the disqualification period for those regarded as "voluntarily unemployed" from 6 to 13 weeks, but at the same time introduced a new, more generous benefit known as Family Credit for students between the ages of 16 and 18 who had lost benefit entitlement altogether, and for those who previously received Family Income Supplement, which was replaced by this new benefit. However, a poverty trap made this benefit "less generous than it appears", according to one study.

=== Foreign relations ===
==== Rhodesia, 1979 ====
Before the 1979 election Thatcher was on record as supporting the all-white government of Ian Smith in Rhodesia. Under intense world pressure it held elections that included some black candidates. One of them, Methodist Bishop Abel Muzorewa, became prime minister of "Zimbabwe Rhodesia" in June 1979 with Smith's support. Thatcher, new to 10 Downing Street, praised the bishop. White Rhodesians expected Britain to recognise the Muzorewa regime and end crippling sanctions. However, Thatcher reversed herself. She withheld recognition and manoeuvred the Muzorewa government into accepting new elections. They had to include Joshua Nkomo and his Zimbabwe African People's Union as well as Robert Mugabe and his Zimbabwe African National Union. These were revolutionary movements that Rhodesian security forces had been trying to suppress for years. Under her direction, foreign secretary Lord Carrington brokered the Lancaster House Agreement of December 1979. It resumed British control of Rhodesia, declared a ceasefire, ended guerrilla action, and quickly led to the creation of the Republic of Zimbabwe. Thus Thatcher's refusal to recognise the Muzorewa government ultimately allowed Mugabe to take power, an outcome that outraged whites in Rhodesia but which satisfied British opinion and was applauded internationally. Hugo Young (p. 183) states, "She had been instrumental in creating another Third World country."

According to Robert Matthews, the success of the Lancaster House negotiations can be explained by four factors:

A balance of forces on the battlefield that clearly favoured the nationalists; international sanctions and their adverse effects on Rhodesia's economy and Salisbury's ability to wage war; a particular pattern of third party interests; and finally, the skill and resources that Lord Carrington as mediator brought to the table.

==== Iranian Embassy siege, 1980 ====
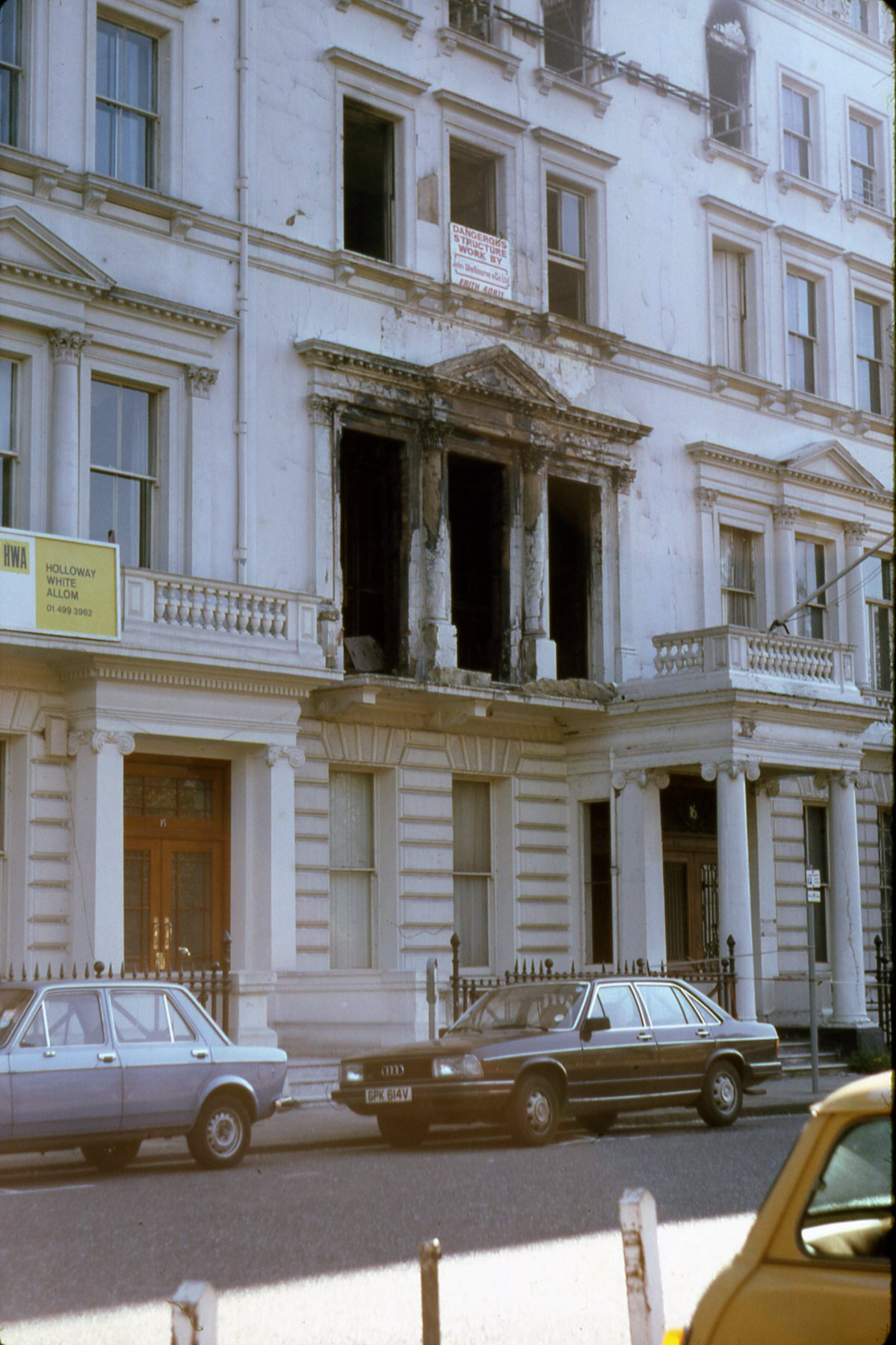
Thatcher's decisive response to the Iranian Embassy siege (aftermath pictured) won her widespread praise during a difficult period for the British economy.

Thatcher's determination to face down political violence was first demonstrated during the 1980 siege of the Embassy of Iran, London, when the armed forces were for the first time in 70 years authorised to use lethal force on the British mainland. For six days in May, 26 hostages were held by six gunmen; the siege came to a dramatic end with a successful raid by SAS commandos. Later that day, Thatcher went to congratulate the SAS men involved and sat among them watching a re-run of the attack. The breaking of the siege by the SAS was later ranked by the public as one of television's greatest moments.

Her decisiveness—christened the "resolute approach" by the prime minister herself—became Thatcher's trademark and a source of her popularity. In the words of one historian:

The mood reflected Mrs Thatcher's Iron Lady stance, her proclaimed intention of laying the "Suez Syndrome" to rest and again projecting Britain as a great power. Celebration of the SAS was a key component in the popular militarism of the 1980s, fuelled by the continuing "war" against international terrorism and by the Falklands conflict and Gulf War. The storming of the Iranian Embassy had shown that Britain could meet terror with counter-terror: Mrs Thatcher's black-clad "terminators" would protect us.

Commenting on the SAS's action, social services secretary Norman Fowler agreed: "Mrs Thatcher attracted public support because she seemed to be taking action which the public overwhelmingly thought was right but never thought any government would have the nerve to carry out".

==== Afghanistan and Poland ====
When the Soviet Union troops entered Afghanistan in December 1979, Thatcher saw it as a typical example of "relentless Communist imperialism". However, the foreign ministry said the Kremlin was desperately trying to save its failing ally there. Thatcher supported the American plan to boycott the Moscow Olympics, as did Parliament. However, the athletes disagreed, and they went to Moscow anyway.

Thatcher gave the go ahead for Whitehall to approve MI6 (and the SAS) to undertake 'disruptive action' in Afghanistan. Supporting the Central Intelligence Agency (CIA) in Operation Cyclone, they also supplied weapons, training and intelligence to the mujahideen. Thatcher visited Pakistan in October 1981 meeting with Pakistan leader General Mohammad Zia-ul-Haq. She visited some of the many hundreds of thousands of Afghans gathered in refugee camps there giving a speech stating that the 'hearts of the free world were with them'. Five years later two of the Mujaheddin warlords Gulbuddin Hekmatyar and Abdul Haq met Thatcher in Downing Street.

The Polish crisis of 1980 and 1981 involved large-scale anti-Communist protests in the heartland of Soviet-controlled Eastern Europe. Thatcher recognised that Soviet hegemony was vulnerable in Poland and offered public support for Lech Wałęsa and his Solidarity labour union, in close co-operation with the United States and Pope John Paul II (a long-time leader of Polish Catholicism). Thatcher considered Poland as a key centre of Soviet vulnerability. She offered limited help to Solidarity in tandem with the United States. Success came with the thaw in superpower relations, the consolidation of Thatcherism at home and the march of neo-liberal ideas internationally.

==== Falklands War, 1982 ====
On 2 April 1982, the ruling Argentine military junta invaded the Falkland Islands, and on 3 April invaded South Georgia, British Crown Colonies that Britain had always ruled but which Argentina had claimed. Thatcher had not previously shown concern for the islands and had proposed large-scale cuts to her naval forces. Thatcher listened primarily to Admiral Sir Henry Leach, the First Sea Lord; and to Admiral Sir Terence Lewin, the Chief of the Defence Staff. She immediately decided to expel the invaders. She replaced foreign minister Lord Carrington with Francis Pym and rounded up diplomatic support. The United Nations Security Council denounced Argentina's aggression, and France and other allies provided diplomatic and military support. In the United States, Reagan was supportive, but he also launched diplomatic initiatives to resolve the crisis without a war. Thatcher assembled and sent a naval task force to take back control in three days.

This map summarises the deployment of Argentine versus British naval forces around the Islands before the Argentine ARA Belgrano was sunk.

In the six weeks it took to arrive, she engaged in diplomatic efforts moderated by Reagan's secretary of state Alexander Haig, but Argentina rejected all compromise proposals. Public opinion, and both major parties, backed Thatcher's aggressive response. The task force sank an Argentine cruiser, forcing the Argentine Navy back to its home harbours. However, it had to deal with a nearby land-based Argentine Air Force, using primarily surface-to-air heat-seeking missiles, Harriers, and V bombers, the last to crater the Port Stanley runway. Argentine forces in the Falklands surrendered on 14 June; the operation was hailed as a great triumph, with only 258 British casualties. Victory brought a wave of patriotic enthusiasm and contributed to Thatcher's re-election, with one poll showing that 84% of the electorate approved of the prime minister's handling of the crisis. (Note: For Thatcher's perspective, see Moore (2013:656–758) and Campbell (2003:160–206).)

Restoring British control over a small colony was a response to aggression, but it also represented a sensibility that Britain had a responsibility to protect its "kith and kin." Thatcher saw the issue as freedom versus oppression and dictatorship. Her sensibility was widely shared in the UK. Historian Ezequiel Mercau argues that the islanders' demands for decolonisation were weak. Instead their predominant sentiment was a close "kith and kin" identification with the people of Great Britain that gave the Falklanders a "loyalty to the Crown."

=== Northern Ireland ===
In May 1980, one day before Thatcher was due to meet the Irish Taoiseach, Charles Haughey, to discuss Northern Ireland, she announced in Parliament that "the future of the constitutional affairs of Northern Ireland is a matter for the people of Northern Ireland, this government, this parliament, and no-one else".

In 1981, a number of Provisional Irish Republican Army (IRA) and Irish National Liberation Army prisoners in Northern Ireland's Maze Prison (also known in Northern Ireland as Long Kesh, its previous official name) went on hunger strike to regain the status of political prisoners, which had been revoked five years earlier under the preceding Labour government. Bobby Sands, the first of the strikers, was elected as an MP for the constituency of Fermanagh and South Tyrone a few weeks before he died of starvation. Thatcher refused to countenance a return to political status for republican prisoners, famously declaring "Crime is crime is crime; it is not political". After nine more men had died, most rights were restored to paramilitary prisoners, but official recognition of their political status was not granted. Thatcher later asserted: "The outcome was a significant defeat for the IRA."

Thatcher also continued the "Ulsterisation" policy of the previous Labour government and its Secretary of State for Northern Ireland, Roy Mason, believing that the Unionists of Northern Ireland should be at the forefront in combating Irish republicanism. This meant relieving the burden on the mainstream British Army and elevating the role of the Ulster Defence Regiment and the Royal Ulster Constabulary.

== Second term (June 1983 – June 1987) ==
The second term saw Thatcher in full charge. (Note: For an overview, see Sked & Cook (1993:440–517).)

=== 1983 general election landslide victory ===
Composition of the House of Commons after the election

The "Falklands Factor", along with the resumption of economic growth by the end of 1982, bolstered the Government's popularity and led to Thatcher's victory in the most decisive landslide since the general election of 1945 with 397 seats.

The Labour Party at this time had split, and there was a new challenge in the SDP–Liberal Alliance, formed by an electoral pact between the Social Democratic Party and the Liberal Party. However, this grouping failed to make its intended breakthrough, despite briefly holding an opinion poll lead.

In the June 1983 general election, the Conservatives won 42.4% of the vote, the Labour Party 27.6% and the Alliance 25.4%. Though the gap between Labour and the Alliance was narrow in terms of votes, the Alliance vote was scattered, and they won only a fraction of the seats that Labour held, with its concentrated base. The Conservatives' share of the vote fell slightly (1.5%) since 1979. Labour's vote had fallen by far more (9.3%), and the Conservatives now had an overall majority of 144 MPs.

=== Domestic affairs ===
==== Contaminated blood scandal ====
Thatcher was prime minister during what The Guardian described as "the worst treatment disaster in the history of the NHS." Thousands of haemophiliacs were infected with HIV, Hepatitis C, or both, via the clotting-agent Factor VIII. Britain had imported infected supplies of Factor VIII from risky overseas commercial sources; it is generally thought that this was because the Thatcher government had not made public funding available for the NHS sufficient in creating its own supplies.

It has been alleged that the Thatcher cabinet attempted to "cover up" the events of the scandal. In 2017, the Infected Blood Inquiry was announced into the scandal and a group legal action (Jason Evans & Ors) was brought at the High Court.

==== Strikes; miners and newspaper printers ====
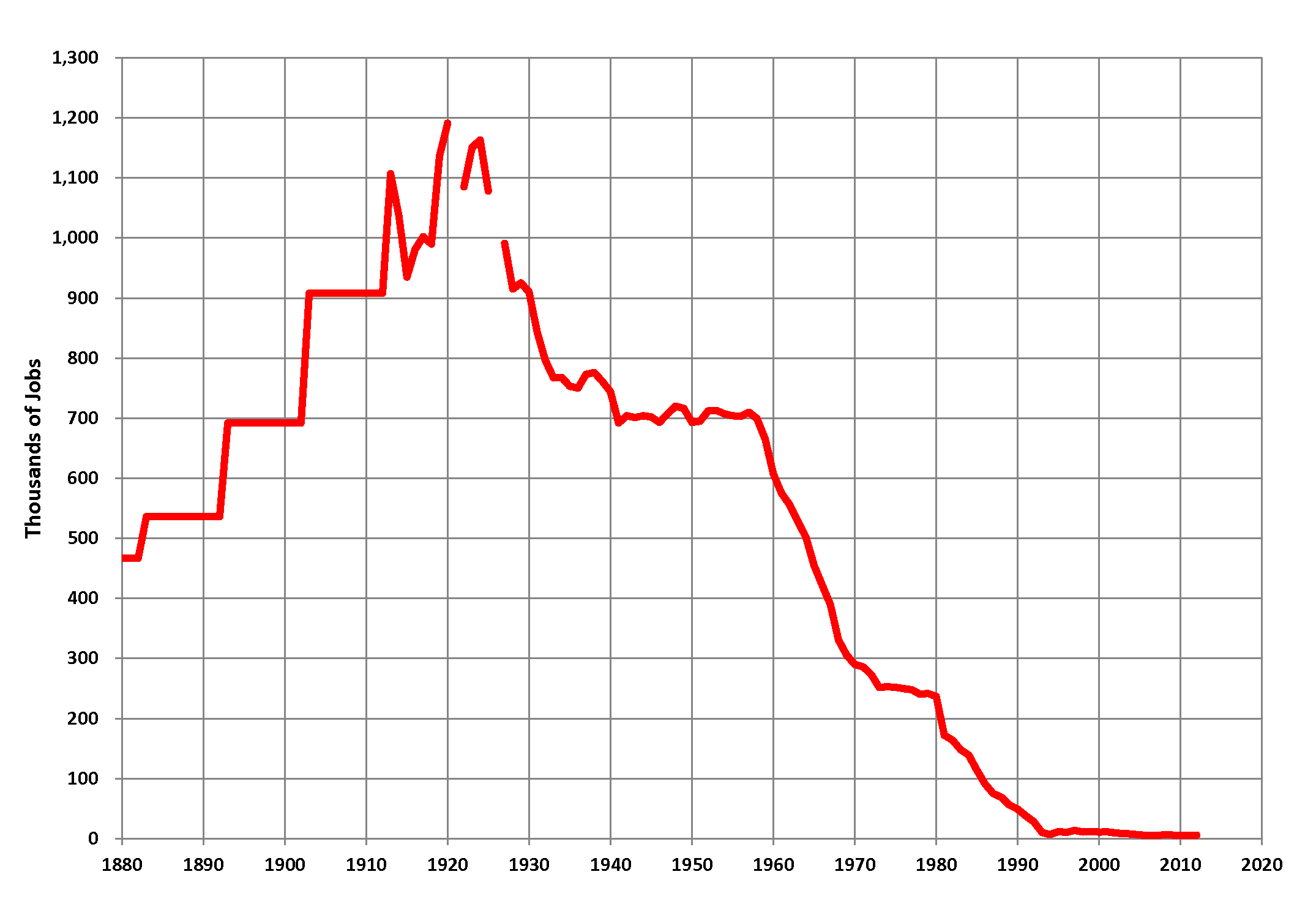
Annual UK coal mining employment, 1880–2012. By 1990 employment fell by over 100,000.

Thatcher was committed to reducing the power of the trade unions but, unlike the Heath government, adopted a strategy of incremental change rather than a single Act. Several unions launched strikes in response, but these actions eventually collapsed. Gradually, Thatcher's reforms reduced the power and influence of the unions. The changes were chiefly focused upon preventing the recurrence of the large-scale industrial actions of the 1970s but were also intended to ensure that the consequences for the participants would be severe if they took any future action. The reforms were also aimed, Thatcher claimed, at democratising the unions and returning power to the members. The most significant measures were to make secondary industrial action illegal, to force union leadership to first win a ballot of the union membership before calling a strike, and to abolish the closed shop. Further laws banned workplace ballots and imposed postal ballots.

"The miners' strike was the central political event of the second Thatcher Administration. Just as the victory in the Falklands War exorcised the humiliation of Suez, so the eventual defeat of the NUM etched in the public mind the end of militant trade unionism which had wrecked the economy and twice played a major part in driving elected governments from office."

— Nigel Lawson, View from No. 11, p. 161

Coal miners were highly organised and had defeated Prime Minister Heath. Thatcher expected a major confrontation, planned ahead for one, and avoided trouble before she was ready. In the end the miners' strike of 1984–85 proved a decisive victory for her—one that permanently discouraged trade unionists. The National Coal Board received the largest amount of public subsidies going to any nationalised industry: by 1984 the annual cost to taxpayers of uneconomic pits had reached £1 billion. The year-long confrontation over strikes carried out from April 1984 by the National Union of Mineworkers (NUM), in opposition to proposals to close a large number of unprofitable mines, proved a decisive victory for Thatcher. The Government had made preparations to counter a strike by the NUM long in advance by building up coal stocks, keeping many miners at work, and co-ordinating police action to stop massive picketing. Her policies defeated the NUM strategy of causing severe cuts in the electricity supply—the legacy of the industrial disputes of 1972 would not be repeated.

The images of crowds of militant miners attempting to prevent other miners from working proved a shock even to some supporters of the strikes. The NUM never held a strike vote, which allowed many miners to keep working and prevented other unions from supporting the strike. The mounting desperation and poverty of the striking families led to divisions within the regional NUM branches, and a breakaway union, the Union of Democratic Mineworkers (UDM), was soon formed. More and more frustrated miners resigned to the impending failure of the strike and, worn down by months of protests, began to defy the union's rulings, starting splinter groups and advising workers that returning to work was the only viable option.

The miners' strike lasted a full year before the NUM leadership conceded without a deal. Conservative governments proceeded to close all but 15 of the country's pits, with the remaining 15 being sold off and privatised in 1994. Since then, private companies have acquired licences to open new pits and open-cast sites, with the majority of the original mines destroyed and the land redeveloped.

The defeat of the miners' strike led to a long period of demoralisation in the whole of the trade union movement.

The 51-week miners' strike of 1984–85 was followed a year later by the 54-week Wapping dispute launched by newspaper printers in London. It resulted in a second major defeat for unions and another victory for Thatcher's union policies, especially her assurance that the police would defend the plants against pickets trying to shut them down. (Note: Thatcher promised adequate police but otherwise was little involved. See Campbell (2003:410) and Moore (2016:496–98).) The target was Britain's largest privately owned newspaper empire, News International (parent of The Times and News of the World and others, all owned by Rupert Murdoch). He wanted to introduce technological innovations that would put 90% of the old-fashioned typesetters out of work. The company offered redundancy payments of £2,000 to £30,000 to each printer to quit their old jobs. The union rejected the offer, and on 24 January 1986, its 6,000 members at Murdoch's papers went on strike. Meanwhile, News International had built and clandestinely equipped a new printing plant in the London district of Wapping. The principal print unions—the National Graphical Association (NGA), the Society of Graphical and Allied Trades (SOGAT 82) and the Amalgamated Union of Engineering Workers (AUEW)—ran closed shops: only union members could be hired at the old Fleet Street plants; most were sons of members. However, the new plant in Wapping did not have a closed shop contract. The company activated its new plant with the assistance of another union, the Electrical, Electronic, Telecommunications and Plumbing Union (EETPU). Most journalists (members of the National Union of Journalists) moved to Wapping, and NUJ Chapels continued to operate. However, the NUJ urged them not to work there; the "refuseniks" refused to go to Wapping. Enough printers did come—670 in all—to produce the same number of papers that it took 6,800 men to print at the old shop. The efficiency was obvious and frightened the union into holding out an entire year. Thousands of union pickets tried to block shipments out of the plant; they injured 574 policemen. There were 1,500 arrests. The pickets failed. The union tried an illegal secondary boycott and was fined in court, losing all its assets which had been used for pensions. In the next two years, Britain's national newspapers opened new plants and abandoned Fleet Street, adopting the new technology with far fewer employees. They had even more reason to support Thatcherism.

==== Privatisation ====
Thatcher's political and economic philosophy emphasised reduced state intervention, free markets, and entrepreneurialism. Since gaining power, she had experimented in selling off a small nationalised company, the National Freight Company, to its workers, with a positive response. One critic on the left dismissed privatisation as "the biggest electoral bribe in history". Following the 1983 election, the Government became bolder and, starting with British Telecom, sold off most of the large utilities which had been in public ownership since the late 1940s. Many people took advantage of share offers, although many sold their shares immediately for a quick profit; therefore, the proportion of shares held by individuals rather than institutions did not increase. The policy of privatisation, while anathema to many on the left, has become synonymous with Thatcherism and was also followed by Tony Blair's government. Wider share-ownership and council house sales became known as "popular" capitalism to its supporters (a description coined by John Redwood).

According to Jacob Ward, the privatisation of British Telecom was a "landmark moment for neoliberalism." It became a model for other countries that sold their state utilities. Planners in the Long Range Planning Department used new computer models to support the transition of telecommunications and, more generally, the dramatic move from social democracy to neoliberalism, from monopoly to market. The telecommunications network was essential to plans for the digitalisation of the economy. Computer simulations were needed to support neoliberalism, both as a managerial tool that could simulate free markets, as well as a technology that enabled the contraction of the government's role in the private sector.

==== Establishment criticism ====
In February 1985, in what was generally viewed as a significant snub from the centre of the British establishment, the University of Oxford voted to refuse Thatcher an honorary degree in protest against her cuts in funding for higher education. This award had previously been given to all prime ministers since the Second World War. Although the Government's counter-claim of increased expenditure was also challenged, the decision of the Oxford dons was widely condemned as "petty" and "vindictive". The chancellor of the university, former prime minister Harold Macmillan (now Lord Stockton), noted that the decision represented a break with tradition, and predicted that the snub would rebound on the university.

In December 1985 Thatcher was criticised from another former Tory bastion when the Church of England report Faith in the City blamed decay of the inner cities on the Government's financial stringency and called for a redistribution of wealth. However, the Government had already introduced special employment and training measures, and ministers dismissed the report as "muddle-headed" and uncosted. The breach with the Church and its liberal bishops remained unhealed until William Hague called for renewed co-operation in 1998.

Soon after, Thatcher suffered her government's only defeat in the House of Commons, with the failure of the Shops Bill 1986. The bill, which would have legalised Sunday shopping, was defeated by a Christian right backbench rebellion, with 72 Conservatives voting against the Government Bill. As well as Thatcher's only defeat, it was the last occasion on which a government bill fell at second reading. The defeat was immediately overshadowed by the US intervention in Libya.

==== Westland affair ====
Thatcher's preference for defence ties with the United States was demonstrated in the Westland affair when, despite ostensibly maintaining a neutral stance, she and Trade and Industry secretary Leon Brittan allowed the helicopter manufacturer Westland, a vital defence contractor, to link with the Sikorsky Aircraft Corporation of the United States. Defence secretary Michael Heseltine had organised a consortium of European and British firms, including the Italian firm Agusta, to make a rival bid. He claimed that Thatcher had prevented proper discussion by cancelling a promised meeting of the Cabinet Economic Affairs Committee early in December 1985. Cabinet eventually (19 December 1985) forbade any minister from actively campaigning for either option.

Thatcher thought Heseltine too powerful and popular a figure to sack. After a period in early January 1986 in which Heseltine and the Thatcher/Brittan camp leaked material damaging to each other's case to the press, Cabinet agreed (9 January) that all statements on the matter, including repetitions of those already made, must be cleared through the Cabinet Office. Heseltine resigned and walked out of the meeting in protest, claiming that Thatcher had broken the conventions of cabinet government. He remained an influential critic and potential leadership challenger and would eventually prove instrumental in Thatcher's fall in 1990. Brittan was then forced to resign for having, earlier that month and with the agreement of Thatcher's press adviser Bernard Ingham, ordered the leak of a confidential legal letter critical of Heseltine. For a time, Thatcher's survival as prime minister seemed in doubt, but her involvement in the leak remained unproven, and she survived after a poor debating performance in the Commons (27 January) by Opposition leader Neil Kinnock.

==== Local government ====
In April 1986, Thatcher, enacting a policy set out in her party's 1983 manifesto, abolished the Greater London Council (GLC) and six top-tier metropolitan county Councils (MCCs):

Map showing councils involved in the rate-capping rebellion of 1985

- Greater Manchester
- Merseyside (including Liverpool)
- South Yorkshire (including Sheffield)
- Tyne and Wear (including Newcastle and Sunderland)
- West Midlands (including Birmingham and Coventry)
- West Yorkshire (including Leeds)

The GLC was the biggest council in Europe; under the leadership of the Labour socialist Ken Livingstone it had doubled its spending in three years, and Thatcher insisted on its abolition as an efficiency measure, transferring most duties to the boroughs, with veto power over major building, engineering and maintenance projects being given to the environment secretary. The Government also argued that the transfer of power to local councils would increase electoral accountability. Critics contended that the "excesses" of a few "loony left" councils helped Mrs Thatcher to launch a party-political assault', as all the eliminated councils were controlled by the Labour Party, favoured higher local government taxes and public spending, and were vocal centres of opposition to her government. The GLC also warned that the break-up of the county councils would lead to the creation of "endless joint committees and over 60 quangos". Several of the councils including the GLC had however rendered themselves vulnerable by committing scarce public funds to controversial causes such as Babies Against the Bomb, the Antiracist Year, and lesbian mothers seeking custody of their children; the Save the GLC campaign itself was estimated to have cost ratepayers £10 million, climaxing in a final defiant week of festivities that cost ratepayers £500,000.

==== Economic boom, 1984–1988 ====
During the 1980s there was a great improvement in the United Kingdom's productivity growth relative to other advanced capitalist countries. Chancellor of the Exchequer Nigel Lawson identified inflation as "the judge and jury of a government's record", but while the country also improved its OECD inflation ranking from fifteenth in 1979 to tenth in the Lawson Boom year of 1987, when inflation had fallen to 4.2%, in the decade as a whole the country still had the second highest inflation rate of the G7 countries. Unemployment had peaked at nearly 3,300,000 in 1984, but had fallen below 3,000,000 by June 1987, in early 1989 it fell below 2,000,000 and by December 1989 it stood at just over 1,600,000.

The United Kingdom's growth rate was more impressive, ranking first in the OECD-16 in 1987, a statistical achievement that Thatcher and her government exploited to the full in the general election campaign of that year. However, the balance of payments record had deteriorated, faring even worse than those of non-oil-exporting countries, and there was a decline in the country's relative standing in terms of unemployment. The resulting welfare payments meant that even though Thatcher and her ministers in 1979 had taken the view that "public expenditure is at the heart of Britain's present economic difficulties", it was not until the boom year of 1987 that the expenditure ratio fell below the 1979 level. For most of the 1980s, the average tax take was higher than in 1979.

=== Ireland and Northern Ireland issues ===
==== Brighton bombing ====
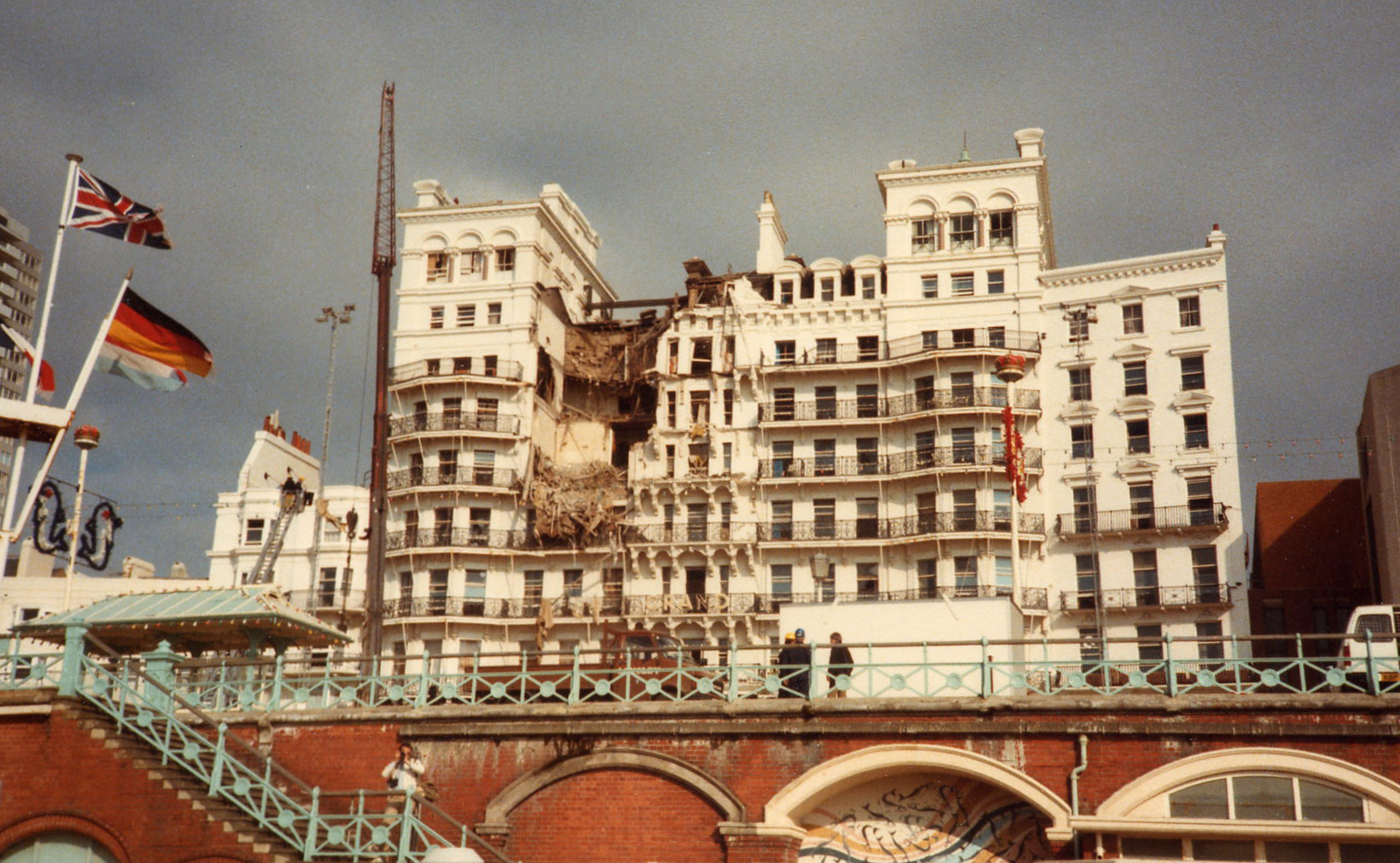
The Grand Hotel on the morning after the bombing. Thatcher's response to the attempt on her life helped to bolster her popularity halfway through the year-long miners' strike.

On the early morning of 12 October 1984, the day before her 59th birthday, Thatcher escaped injury in the Brighton hotel bombing during the Conservative Party Conference when the hotel was bombed by the Provisional Irish Republican Army (IRA). Five people died in the attack, including Roberta Wakeham, wife of the government's chief whip John Wakeham, and Conservative MP Sir Anthony Berry. A prominent member of the Cabinet, Norman Tebbit, was injured, and his wife Margaret was left paralysed. Thatcher herself escaped assassination by sheer luck. She insisted that the conference open on time the next day and made her speech as planned in defiance of the bombers, a gesture which won widespread approval across the political spectrum.

==== Anglo-Irish Agreement ====
On 15 November 1985, Thatcher signed the Hillsborough Anglo-Irish Agreement with Irish Taoiseach Garret FitzGerald. This was the first time a British government gave the Republic of Ireland a say (albeit advisory) in the governance of Northern Ireland. The agreement was greeted with fury by Northern Irish unionists. The Ulster Unionists and Democratic Unionists made an electoral pact and, on 23 January 1986, staged an ad hoc referendum by resigning their seats and contesting the subsequent by-elections, losing only one, to the nationalist Social Democratic and Labour Party (SDLP). However, unlike the Sunningdale Agreement of 1974, they found they could not bring the agreement down by a general strike. This was another effect of the changed balance of power in industrial relations.

=== Foreign affairs ===
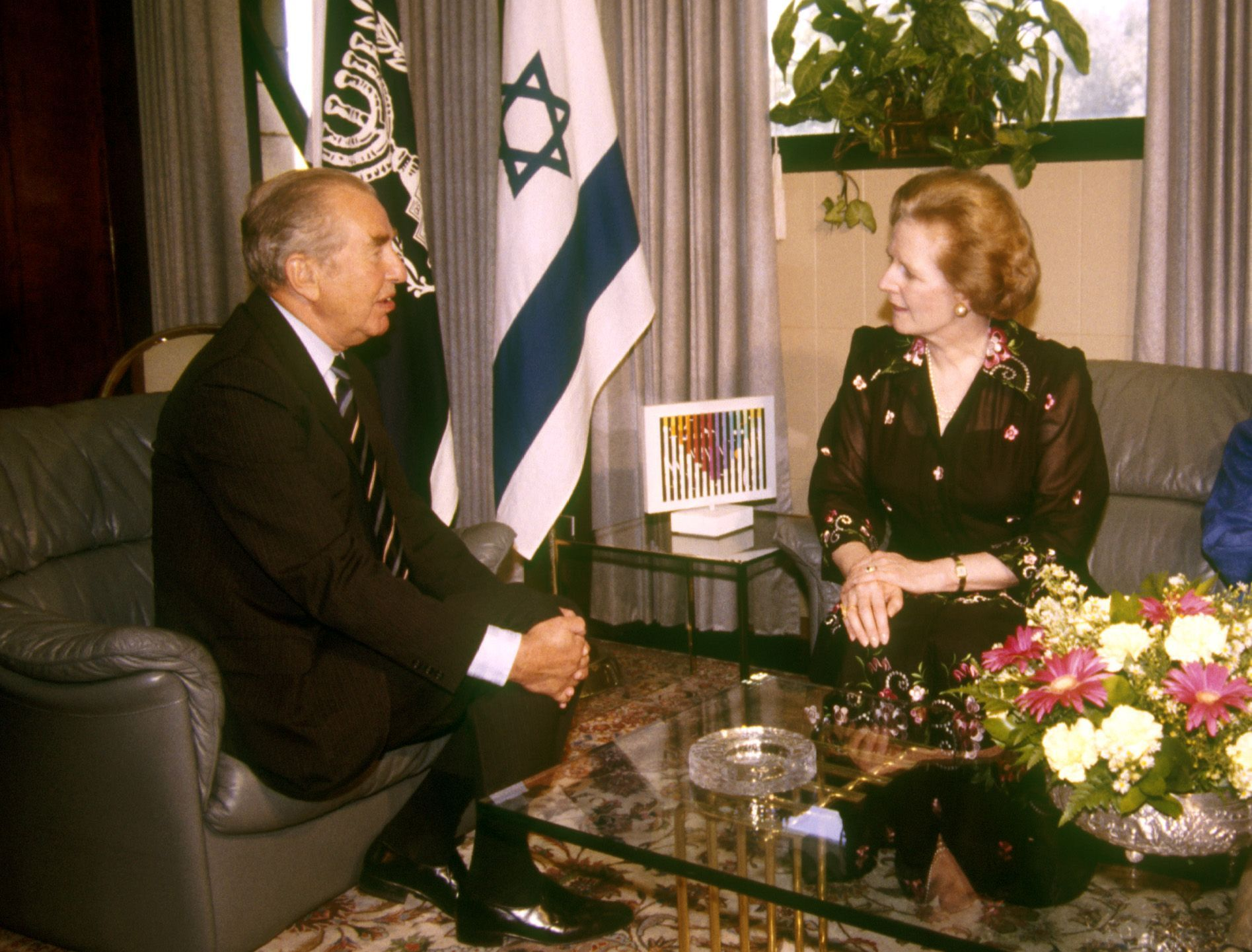
Thatcher at the home of Israeli president Chaim Herzog in 1986

==== Cold War ====
In the Cold War, Thatcher supported US president Ronald Reagan's policies of rollback against the Soviets, which envisioned the end of Communism in Europe (which happened in 1989–91). This contrasted with the policy of détente (or "live and let live") which the West had pursued during the 1970s. In a decision that came under heavy attack from the Labour Party, American forces were permitted by Thatcher to station nuclear cruise missiles at British bases, arousing mass protests by the Campaign for Nuclear Disarmament (CND). A critical factor was Thatcher's idea that Mikhail Gorbachev was the key to the solution, an idea which she cajoled along by such initiatives as her March 1987 speech in the Kremlin. She convinced Reagan that he was "a man we can do business with." This was a start of a move by the West to force a dismantling of Soviet control over Eastern Europe, which Gorbachev realised was necessary if he was to reform the weak Soviet economy. Those who share her views on it credit her with a part in the West's victory, by both the deterrence and détente postures. According to Thatcher, the West won the Cold War "without firing a shot" because the Kremlin would not risk confrontation with NATO's superior forces.

Thatcher played a major role as a broker between Reagan and Gorbachev in 1985–87, with the successful negotiation of the Intermediate-Range Nuclear Forces Treaty (INF). The INF Treaty of December 1987, signed by Reagan and Gorbachev, eliminated all nuclear and conventional missiles, as well as their launchers, with ranges of 500–1,000 kilometres (310–620 mi) (short-range) and 1,000–5,500 kilometres (620–3,420 mi) (intermediate-range). The treaty did not cover sea-launched missiles of the sort Britain possessed. By May 1991, after on-site investigations by both sides, 2700 missiles had been destroyed.

==== US bombing of Libya ====
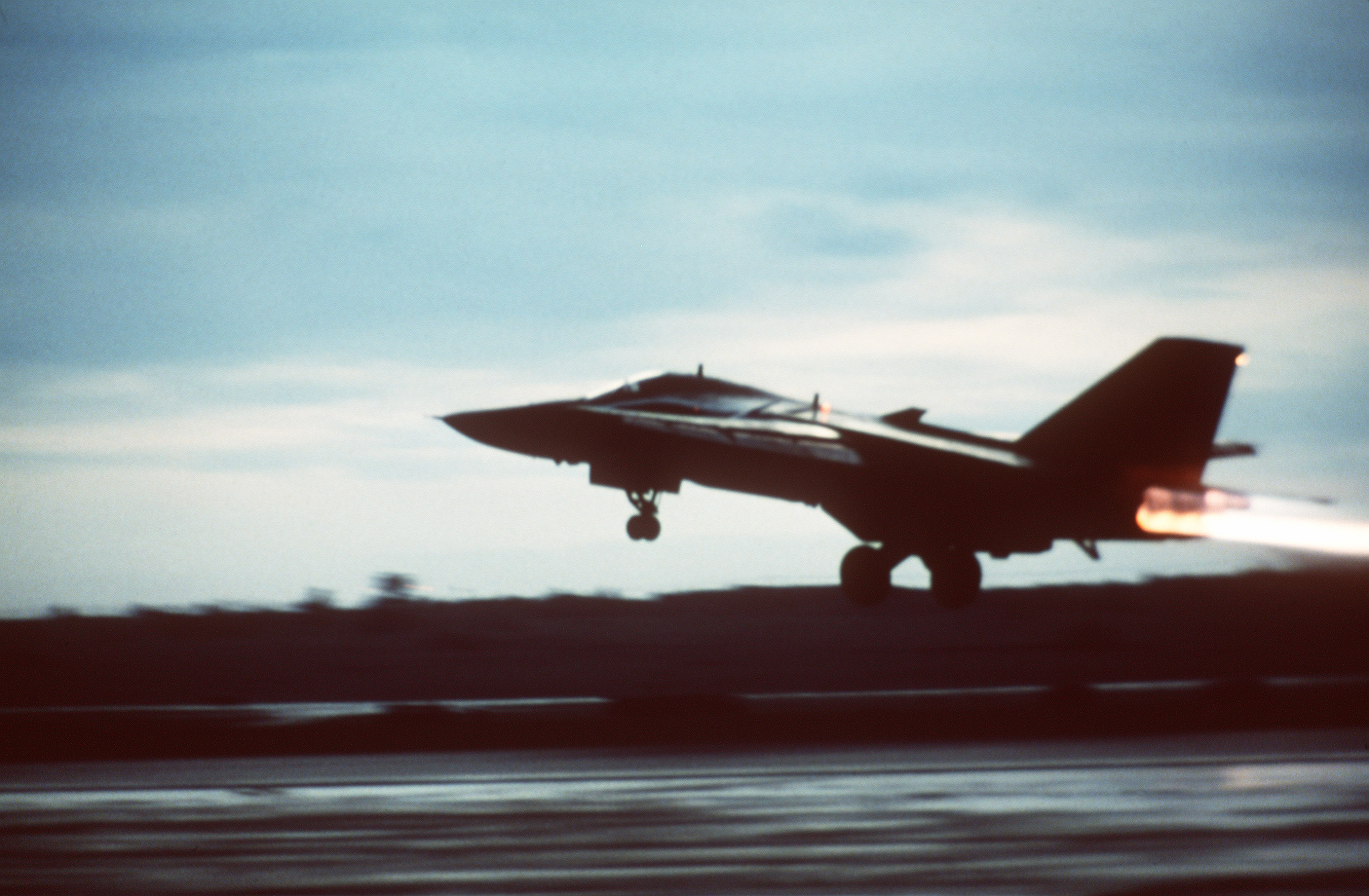
Thatcher allowed American aircraft (pictured) to take off from RAF Lakenheath in April 1986 to participate in an airstrike against Libya.

In the aftermath of a series of terrorist attacks on US military personnel in Europe, which were believed to have been executed at Colonel Gaddafi's command, President Reagan decided to carry out a bombing raid on Libya. Both France and Spain refused to allow US aircraft to fly over their territory for the raid. Thatcher herself had earlier expressed opposition to "retaliatory strikes that are against international law" and had not followed the US in an embargo of Libyan oil. However, Thatcher felt that as the US had given support to Britain during the Falklands and that America was a major ally against a possible Soviet attack in Western Europe, she felt obliged to allow US aircraft to use bases situated in Britain.

Later that year in America, President Reagan persuaded Congress to approve of an extradition treaty which closed a legal loophole by which IRA members and Volunteers escaped extradition by claiming their killings were political acts. This had been previously opposed by Irish-Americans for years but was passed after Reagan used Thatcher's support in the Libyan raid as a reason to pass it.

==== US invasion of Grenada ====
Grenada was a former colony and current independent Commonwealth nation under the Queen. The British government exercised no authority there and did not object when Maurice Bishop took control in a coup in 1979. The small Caribbean island had been ruled by Bishop, a radical Marxist with close ties to Cuba. In October 1983 he was overthrown by dissident Marxists and killed. This alarmed other small countries in the region who had a regional defence organisation, the Organisation of Eastern Caribbean States (OECS), which formally asked the United States for help in removing the new regime. Reagan promptly agreed and almost overnight ordered a major invasion of Grenada. He notified Thatcher a few hours before the invasion, but he did not ask her consent. She was privately highly annoyed, but in Cabinet and Parliament she announced that Britain supported the Americans, saying "We stand by the United States". When it became clear that the American rollback of the upstart Communist regime had been a striking success, Thatcher "came to feel that she had been wrong to oppose it".

==== Apartheid in South Africa ====
Thatcher resisted international pressure to impose economic sanctions on South Africa, where the United Kingdom was the biggest foreign investor and principal trading partner. This meant that the status quo remained, and British companies continued to operate in South Africa, although other European countries continued trading to a lesser degree. According to Geoffrey Howe, one of her closest allies, Thatcher regarded the African National Congress (ANC), which fought to end apartheid, as a "typical terrorist organisation" as late as 1987.

At the end of March 1984, four South Africans were arrested in Coventry, remanded in custody, and charged with contravening the UN arms embargo, which prohibited exports to South Africa of military equipment. Thatcher took a personal interest in the Coventry Four, and 10 Downing Street requested daily summaries of the case from the prosecuting authority, HM Customs and Excise. Within a month, the Coventry Four had been freed from jail and allowed to travel to South Africa, on condition that they return to England for their trial later that year. However, in August 1984, South African foreign minister Pik Botha decided not to allow the Coventry Four to return to stand trial, forfeiting £200,000 bail money put up by the South African embassy in London.

In April 1984, Thatcher sent senior British diplomat, Sir John Leahy, to negotiate the release of 16 Britons who had been taken hostage by the Angolan rebel leader, Jonas Savimbi. At the time, Savimbi's UNITA guerrilla movement was financed and supported militarily by the apartheid regime of South Africa. On 26 April 1984 Leahy succeeded in securing the release of the British hostages at the UNITA base in Jamba, Angola.

In June 1984, Thatcher received a visit from P. W. Botha, the first South African premier to come to Britain since his nation had been removed from the Commonwealth in 1961. Neil Kinnock, Leader of the Labour Party, condemned the visit as a "diplomatic coup" for the South African government, and Labour MEP Barbara Castle rallied European Socialists in an unsuccessful attempt to stop it. In talks at Chequers, Thatcher told Botha the policy of racial separation was "unacceptable". She urged him to free jailed ANC leader Nelson Mandela; to halt the harassment of black dissidents; to stop the bombing of ANC guerrilla bases in Frontline States; and to comply with UN Security Council resolutions and withdraw from Namibia.

Thatcher defended Botha's visit as an encouragement to reform, but he ignored her concern over Mandela's continued detainment, and although a new constitution brought coloured people of mixed race and Indians into a tricameral assembly, 22 million blacks continued to be excluded from the representation. Following the outbreak of violence in September 1984, Thatcher granted temporary sanctuary to six African anti-apartheid leaders in the British consulate in Durban.

In July 1985, Thatcher, citing the support of Helen Suzman, a South African anti-apartheid MP, reaffirmed her belief that economic sanctions against Pretoria would be immoral because they would make thousands of black workers unemployed; instead she characterised industry as the instrument that was breaking down apartheid. She also believed sanctions would disproportionately injure Britain and neighbouring African countries, and argued that political and military measures were more effective.

Thatcher's opposition to economic sanctions was challenged by visiting anti-apartheid activists, including South African bishop Desmond Tutu, whom she met in London, and Oliver Tambo, an exiled leader of the outlawed ANC guerrilla movement, whose links to the Soviet bloc she viewed with suspicion, and whom she declined to see because he espoused violence and refused to condemn guerrilla attacks and mob killings of black policemen, local officials and their families.

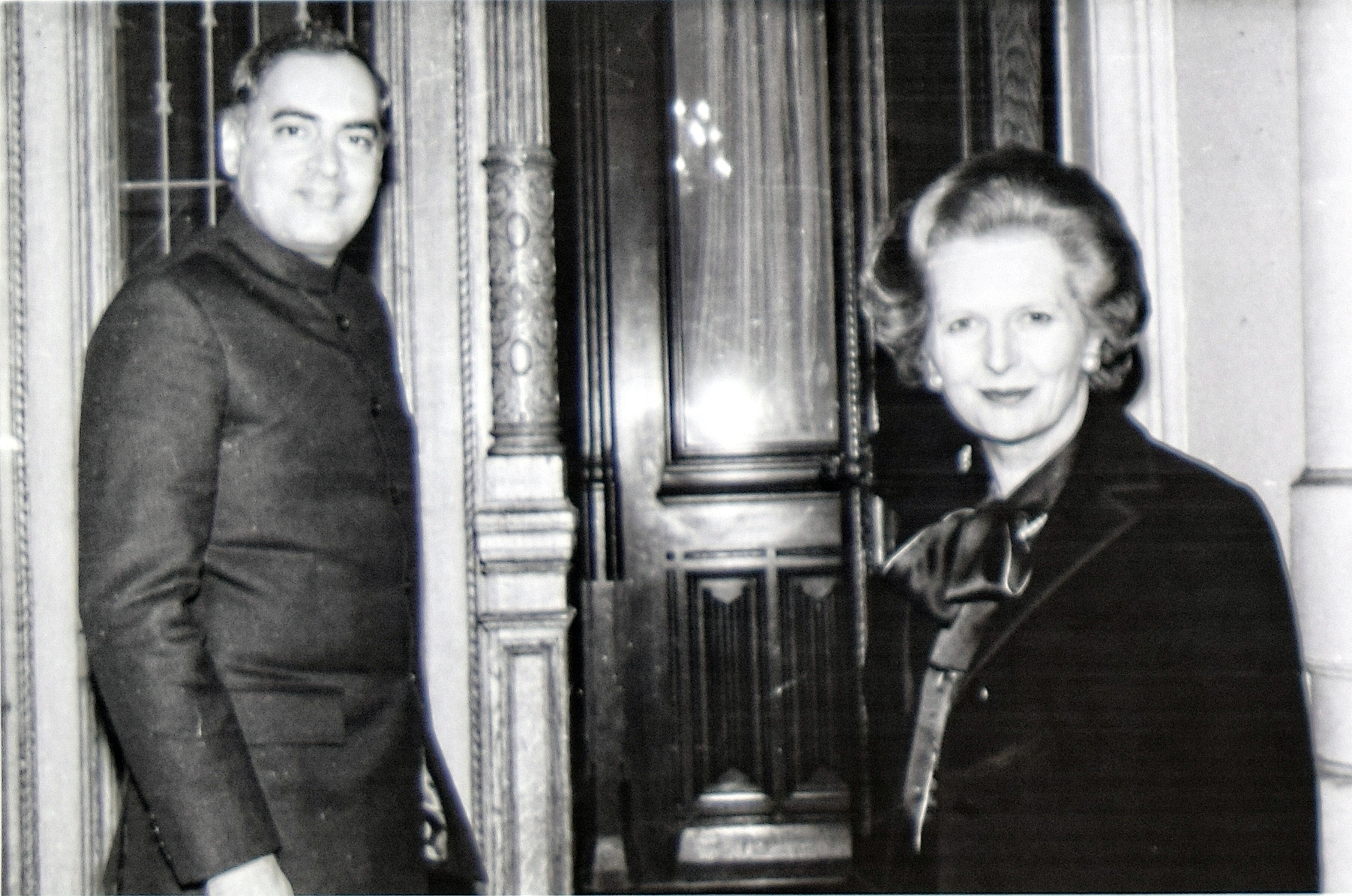
Thatcher with Indian prime minister Rajiv Gandhi in 1985

At a Commonwealth summit in Nassau in October 1985, Thatcher agreed to impose limited sanctions and to set up a contact group to promote a dialogue with Pretoria, after she was warned by Third World leaders, including Indian prime minister Rajiv Gandhi and Malaysian prime minister Mahathir Mohamad, that her opposition threatened to break up the 49-nation Commonwealth. In return, calls for a total embargo were abandoned, and the existing restrictions adopted by member states against South Africa were lifted. ANC president Tambo expressed disappointment at this major compromise.

==== China and Hong Kong ====
Hong Kong was ceded to the British Empire following the First Opium War and in 1898, Britain obtained a 99-year lease on the New Territories. In 1984 Thatcher visited China intending to resolve the difficulties that would inevitably be encountered as the New Territories were due to be returned to the Chinese in 1997. She signed an agreement with Deng Xiaoping to hand back not simply the New Territories, but the whole colony, in exchange for China awarding the colony the special status within China of a "Special Administrative Region". Under the terms of the agreement, China was obliged to leave Hong Kong's economic status unchanged after the handover on 1 July 1997, for at least fifty years.

==== European rebate ====
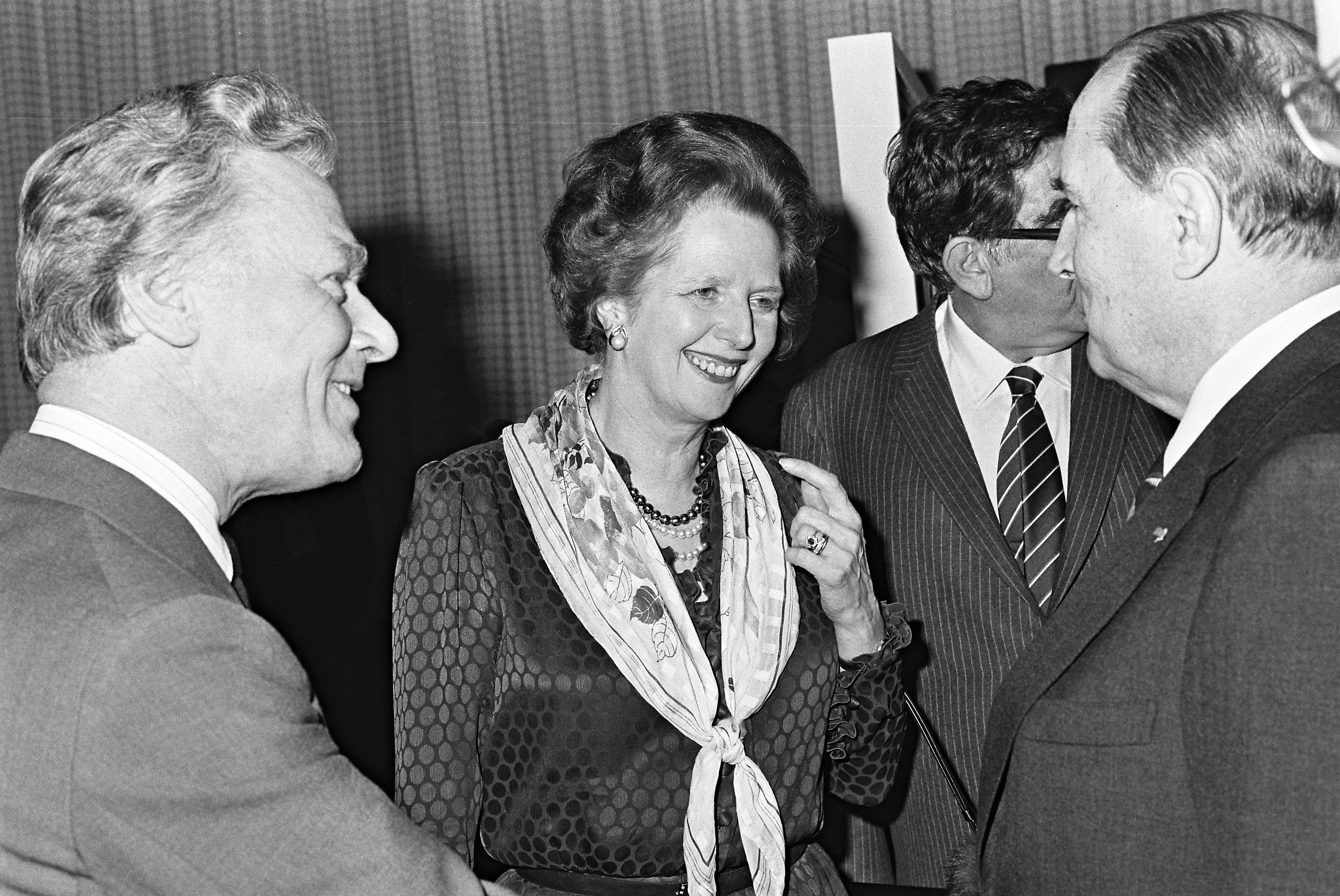
Thatcher with Danish Prime Minister Poul Schlüter and French President François Mitterrand with in the European Council Summit in Athens, 4 December 1983

At the Dublin European Council in November 1979, Thatcher argued that the United Kingdom paid far more to the European Economic Community (EEC) than it received in spending. She famously declared at the summit: "We are not asking the Community or anyone else for money. We are simply asking to have our own money back". Her arguments were successful, and at the June 1984 Fontainebleau Summit, the EEC agreed on an annual rebate for the United Kingdom, amounting to 66% of the difference between Britain's EU contributions and receipts. Although Labour prime minister Tony Blair later agreed to reduce the rebate size significantly, this would remain in effect. It periodically caused political controversy among the member states of the European Union.

==== Channel Tunnel ====
"The key change from earlier attempts was that, for the first time in the checkered history of the Tunnel project, there was a British Prime Minister who was strongly in favour of it, and applied all the drive of her formidable personality to see it through."

— P. M. H. Bell, France and Britain, 1940–1994, p. 254

Thatcher, like many Britons, had long been fascinated by the idea of a tunnel under the English Channel linking to France. The idea had been tossed around for over a century but was always vetoed, usually, by insularity-minded Englishmen. Opposition to the tunnel over the decades reflected the high value the British placed on their insularity, and their preference for imperial links that they controlled directly. By the 1960s, circumstances had changed radically. The British Empire collapsed, and the Suez crisis made clear that Britain was no longer a superpower and had to depend on its military allies on the continent. The Conservatives could more carefully consider the long-term economic value to business and strategic value, and also the new sense of a European identity. Labour was worried that a tunnel would bring new workers and lower wage rates. Britain's prestige, security and wealth now seemed safest when tied closely to the continent.

Thatcher and François Mitterrand agreed on the project and set up study groups. Mitterrand as a socialist said the French government would pay its share. Thatcher insisted on private financing for the British share, and the City assured her that private enterprise was eager to fund it. Final decisions were announced in January 1986.

== Third term (June 1987 – November 1990) ==
Thatcher's third term started well but the economic boom faltered. Her mistakes multiplied and her enemies in her party and the general public multiplied. (Note: For an overview, see Sked & Cook (1993:518–551).)

=== 1987 general election landslide victory ===
Composition of the House of Commons after the election

Thatcher led her party to another landslide victory in the 1987 general election with a 102-seat majority. Her resolute personality played a key role in overcoming the well-organised, media-wise Labour campaign led by Neil Kinnock, who was weakened by his party's commitment to unilateral nuclear disarmament at a time Thatcher was helping to end the Cold War. Fleet Street (the national newspapers) mostly supported her and were rewarded with regular press briefings by her press secretary, Bernard Ingham. Polls showed that Thatcher's leadership style was more important for voters than party identification, economic concerns, and indeed all other issues. She entered the record books, becoming the longest continuously serving prime minister since Lord Liverpool (1812–1827), and the first to win three successive elections since Lord Palmerston in 1865. On New Year's Day 1988, Thatcher became the longest-serving prime minister of the 20th century, having bested H. H. Asquith and Winston Churchill's records.

Despite her third straight victory she remained a polarising figure. Performative hatred from the far left motivated scores of songs that "expressed anger, amusement, defiance and ridicule" towards her. A common chant among protestors was "Maggie Out!"

=== Domestic policies ===
==== Economics and welfare reforms ====
With the battle against inflation and strikes long won, an economic boom was in its early stages. Unemployment had fallen below 3,000,000 during the spring of 1987, and the tax cuts by chancellor Nigel Lawson sent the economy into overdrive. By early 1988, unemployment was below 2,500,000. A year later, it fell below 2,000,000. By the end of 1989, it was down to 1,600,000. A residential property price surge saw the average home price in Britain double between 1986 and 1989.

However, this led to the government doubling interest rates during 1988 and it chose to increase these further during 1989 and 1990 as inflation increased. In 1988, Chancellor of the Exchequer Nigel Lawson reacted to a market fall with a reflationary budget, stoking inflation and precipitating a slide in the Government's fortunes. By the time of Thatcher's resignation in 1990, inflation had again hit 10%, the same level she had found it in 1979.

As early as September 1988, economists warned that the economic boom would soon be over and that 1989 could see a recession set in. For the moment, the economy defied these predictions; it continued to grow throughout 1989, and unemployment continued to fall, despite the United States entering recession that year.

Employment was booming by the late 1980s, above all in the financial and retail sectors, particularly on new commercial developments built on old industrial sites. For example, the Merry Hill Shopping Centre in the West Midlands saw 6,000 retail jobs created between 1984 and 1989 on the former Round Oak Steelworks site that had shed just over 1,200 jobs when it closed in 1982. The comparable MetroCentre was built at Gateshead, Tyne and Wear, around the same time.

On 29 March 1988, the chancellor of the Duchy of Lancaster and minister of trade and industry, Kenneth Clarke, announced the sale to British Aerospace of the Rover Group, the new name of British Leyland, which had been nationalised in 1975 by the government of Harold Wilson.

The threat of recession finally became a reality in October 1990, when it was confirmed that the economy had declined during the third quarter of the year. Unemployment started to rise again. Inflation, which the first Thatcher government had conquered by 1983, was touching 10% for the first time in eight years.

Overall, the economic record of Thatcher's government is disputed. In relative terms, it could be held there was a modest revival of British fortunes. Real gross domestic product (GDP) had grown by 26.8% over 1979–89 in the United Kingdom as against 24.3% for the EC-12 average. Measured by total factor productivity, labour, and capital, British productivity growth between 1979 and 1993 compared favourably with the OECD average.

However, under Thatcherite management, the macro-economy was unstable, even by the standards of the Keynesian era of stop-go. The amplitude of fluctuations in GDP and real gross private non-residential fixed capital formation was greater in the United Kingdom than for the OECD.

In the Thatcher years the top 10% of earners received almost 50% of the tax remissions, but there proved to be no simple trade-off between equality and efficiency. The receipts ratio did not fall below the 1979 level until 1992. The expenditure ratio rose again after Thatcher's resignation in 1990, even climbing for a time above the 1979 figure. The cause was the heavy budget charge of the recessions of 1979–81 and 1990–92 and the extra funding required to meet the higher level of unemployment.

In Thatcher's third term, welfare reforms created an adult Employment Training system that included full-time work done for the dole plus a £10 top-up, on the workfare model from the United States.

==== NHS internal market ====
Thatcher had initially not made any major attempts to reform the National Health Service. However, based on recommendations from the Griffiths report of 1983 into NHS management, from 1988 onwards she began to apply the principles of New Public Management throughout the welfare state, including the NHS, in order to decentralise decision making and introduce competition, with the goal of making the state a purchaser of healthcare rather than a provider. The National Health Service and Community Care Act 1990 established an internal market within the NHS which divided NHS providers into those that provided services and those that purchased services from them, requiring NHS hospitals and other service providers to generate their own income and compete for business. The intention was that patients would be given the option to choose between different providers and would inevitably choose the best hospitals, the money would follow the patients and the best hospitals would prosper. However, in practice the majority of patients were not in a position to exercise choice between providers and so the internal market was not as successful as Thatcher had anticipated.

==== Section 28 ====
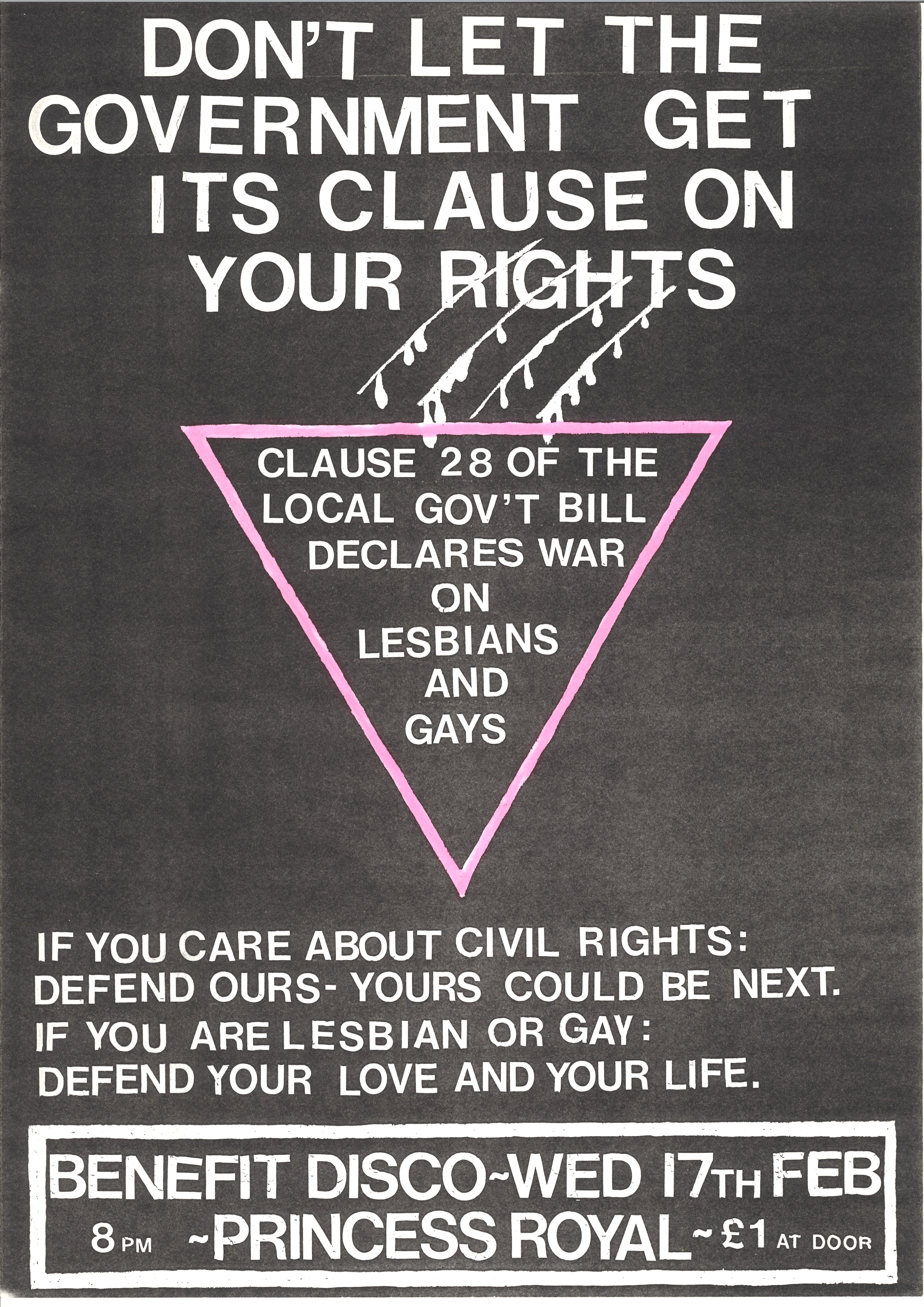
A 1988 flyer for a benefit disco in opposition to Section 28

Though an early backer of the decriminalisation of male homosexuality, at the 1987 Conservative Party conference, Thatcher's speech read: "Children who need to be taught to respect traditional moral values are being taught that they have an inalienable right to be gay". Backbench Conservative MPs and peers had already begun a backlash against the "promotion" of homosexuality and, in December 1987, the controversial "Section 28" was added as an amendment to what became the Local Government Act 1988.

On 24 May 1988, Thatcher's government passed the legislation of Section 28. It stated that local authorities in England, Scotland and Wales "shall not intentionally promote homosexuality or publish material with the intention of promoting homosexuality" or "promote the teaching in any maintained school of the acceptability of homosexuality as a pretended family relationship". The law effectively encouraged overt discrimination against LGBT people in the UK. Section 28 existed until 18 November 2003.

==== Environment ====
Thatcher, a trained chemist, became publicly concerned with environmental issues in the late 1980s. In 1988, she made a major speech accepting the problems of global warming, ozone depletion, and acid rain. In 1990, she opened the Hadley Centre for Climate Prediction and Research. In her book Statecraft (2003), she described her later regret in supporting the concept of human-induced global warming, outlining the negative effects she perceived it had upon the policy-making process. "Whatever international action we agree upon to deal with environmental problems, we must enable our economies to grow and develop, because without growth you cannot generate the wealth required to pay for the protection of the environment".

=== Foreign affairs ===
==== European integration ====
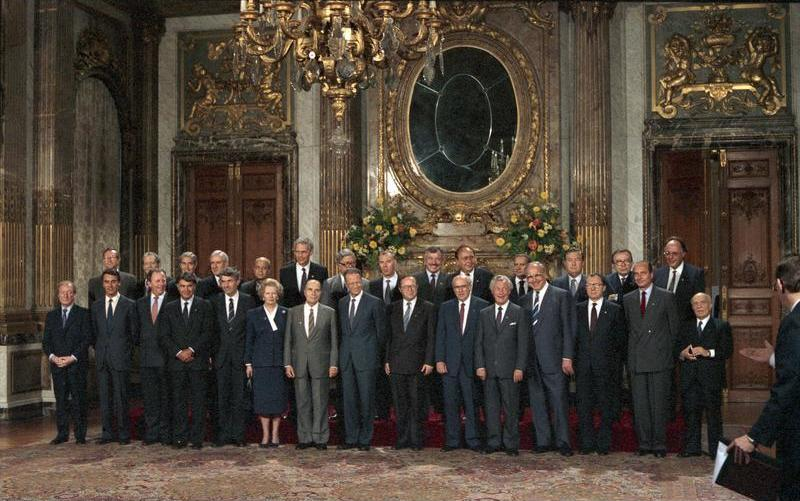
The 1987 meeting of the European Council. (Thatcher stands in front, sixth from left.)

At Bruges in 1988, Thatcher made a speech in which she outlined her opposition to proposals from the European Economic Community for a federal structure and increasing centralisation of decision-making. Although she had supported British membership, Thatcher believed that the role of the EC should be limited to ensuring free trade and effective competition, and feared that new EC regulations would reverse the changes she was making in the UK, stating that she had "not successfully rolled back the frontiers of the state in Britain" only to see her reforms undermined by "a European super-state exercising a new dominance from Brussels". She was specifically against Economic and Monetary Union, through which a single currency would replace national currencies, and for which the EC was making preparations. (Note: Thatcher's successor John Major would eventually secure a British opt-out from the euro at the Maastricht Treaty negotiated at the end of 1991, and Britain would remain outside the eurozone. The introduction of the euro was postponed because of the collapse of the Exchange Rate Mechanism in summer 1993, but it has been in force as legal tender since 1999.) The speech caused an outcry from other European leaders and exposed for the first time the deep split that was emerging over European policy inside her Conservative Party.

"We have not successfully rolled back the frontiers of the state in Britain, only to see them re-imposed at a European level with a European super-state exercising a new dominance from Brussels."

— Margaret Thatcher, Speech to the College of Europe, 20 September 1988

In 1987–88, Chancellor Nigel Lawson had been following a policy of "shadowing the Deutsche Mark", i.e. cutting interest rates and selling pounds to try to prevent the pound rising above DM 3.00 (as a substitute for joining the European Exchange Rate Mechanism which Thatcher had vetoed in 1985); in an interview for the Financial Times, in November 1987, Thatcher claimed not to have been told of this and disapproved. By 1989 the economy was suffering from high interest rates (they peaked at 15% in autumn 1989) imposed to temper a potentially unsustainable boom, which she believed had been exacerbated by Lawson's policies. Thatcher's popularity once again declined.

At a meeting before the European Community summit in Madrid in June 1989, Lawson and foreign secretary Geoffrey Howe forced Thatcher to agree to the circumstances under which she would join the European Exchange Rate Mechanism. At the meeting, they both threatened they would resign if Thatcher did not meet their demands. Thatcher responded by moving Howe to Leader of the House of Commons (despite giving him the title Deputy Prime Minister he was now effectively removed from decision-making over Europe) and by listening more to her adviser Sir Alan Walters on economic matters. Lawson resigned that October, feeling that Thatcher had undermined him.

==== South Africa and release of Mandela ====
Thatcher continued to be the leading international advocate of a policy of contact with apartheid South Africa, and the most forthright opponent of economic sanctions against the country, which a white minority government ruled. Her stand had divided the Commonwealth 48–1 at three conferences since 1985, but had brought her influence in South Africa's white community. Rejecting the US policy of disinvestment as a mistake, she argued a prosperous society would be more receptive to change.

In October 1988, Thatcher said she would be unlikely to visit South Africa unless black nationalist leader Nelson Mandela was released from prison. In March 1989 she stressed the need to release him for multi-party talks to take place, urging that the ANC's promise to suspend violence should be enough to permit his release and that the "renunciation of violence" should not be an absolute condition for negotiations for a settlement. At the end of March 1989, Thatcher's six-day, 10,000-mile tour through southern Africa—a follow-up to her "look and learn" exercise in Kenya and Nigeria in 1988—did not include South Africa because Mandela had not yet been released.

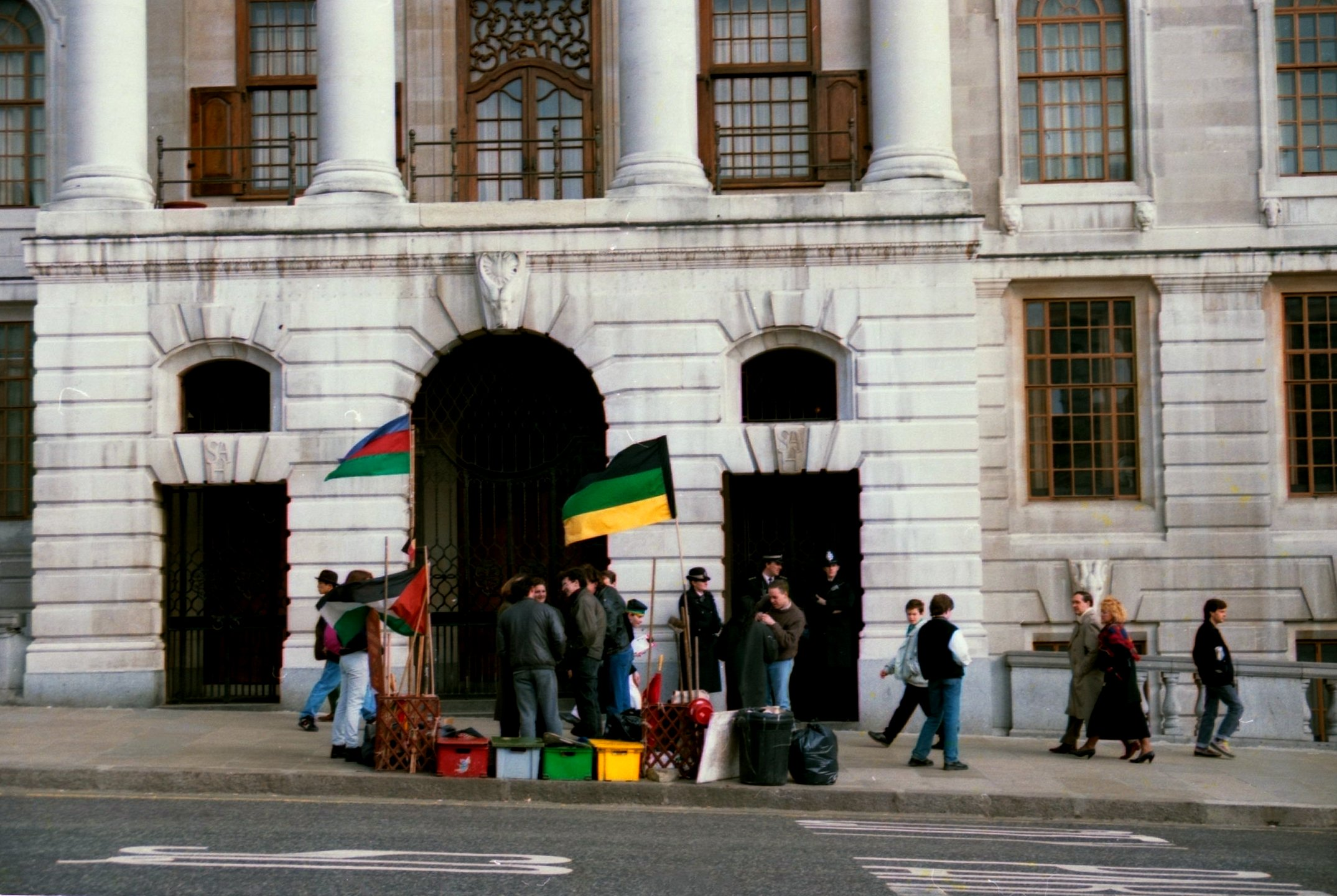
Anti-Apartheid Movement protest at South Africa House in London, 1989

Thatcher met reformist F. W. de Klerk in London in June 1989 and stressed that Mandela must be freed and reforms put in place before she would visit the country. In July 1989 she called for the release not only of Mandela but also Walter Sisulu and Oscar Mpetha before all-group talks could continue.

Thatcher, therefore, welcomed de Klerk's decision in February 1990 to release Mandela and lift the ban on the ANC, and said the change vindicated her positive policy: "We believe in carrots as well as sticks". However Thatcher had also set the freeing of Mandela as a condition of friendship with the white government.

Thatcher said the European Community's voluntary ban on new investment should be lifted when Mandela was released. However her call to the world to reward reforms was countered by Mandela himself, who while still in jail argued sanctions must be maintained until the end of white rule, and criticised her decision to lift a ban on new investment unilaterally. Mandela declared: "We regard the attitude of the British Government on the question of sanctions as of primary importance ... My release from prison was the direct result of the people inside and outside South Africa. It was also the result of the immense pressure exerted on the South African Government by the international community, in particular from the people of the UK."

However, foreign secretary Douglas Hurd was adamant: "We needed to make a practical response to a man, President F. W. de Klerk, who has taken his political life into his hands". Nevertheless, as a gesture of goodwill Thatcher agreed to begin aid to the ANC, which until its suspension of violence she had criticised as "a typical terrorist organisation", her disapproval reinforced by her anti-socialism.

Thatcher's opposition to sanctions left her isolated within the Commonwealth and the European Community, and Mandela did not take up an early offer to meet her, opposing her proposed visit to his country as premature. Mandela rejected all concessions to the South African government, which he accused of seeking the easing of sanctions before it had offered "profound and irreversible change".

Mandela delayed meeting Thatcher until he had gathered support for sanctions from other world leaders in the course of a four-week, 14-nation tour of Europe and the United States. Their first meeting failed to resolve differences over her unilateral lifting of sanctions and his refusal to renounce armed struggle until existing conditions for the black majority in South Africa changed. In their economic discussions, Mandela initially favoured nationalisation as a preferred method for redistributing wealth between blacks and whites, but with British investment in South Africa in 1989 accounting for half of the total, and with bilateral trade worth just over $3.2 billion, Thatcher successfully urged him to adopt free-market solutions, arguing they were necessary to maintain the kind of growth that would sustain a liberal democracy.

==== German reunification and the Gulf War ====
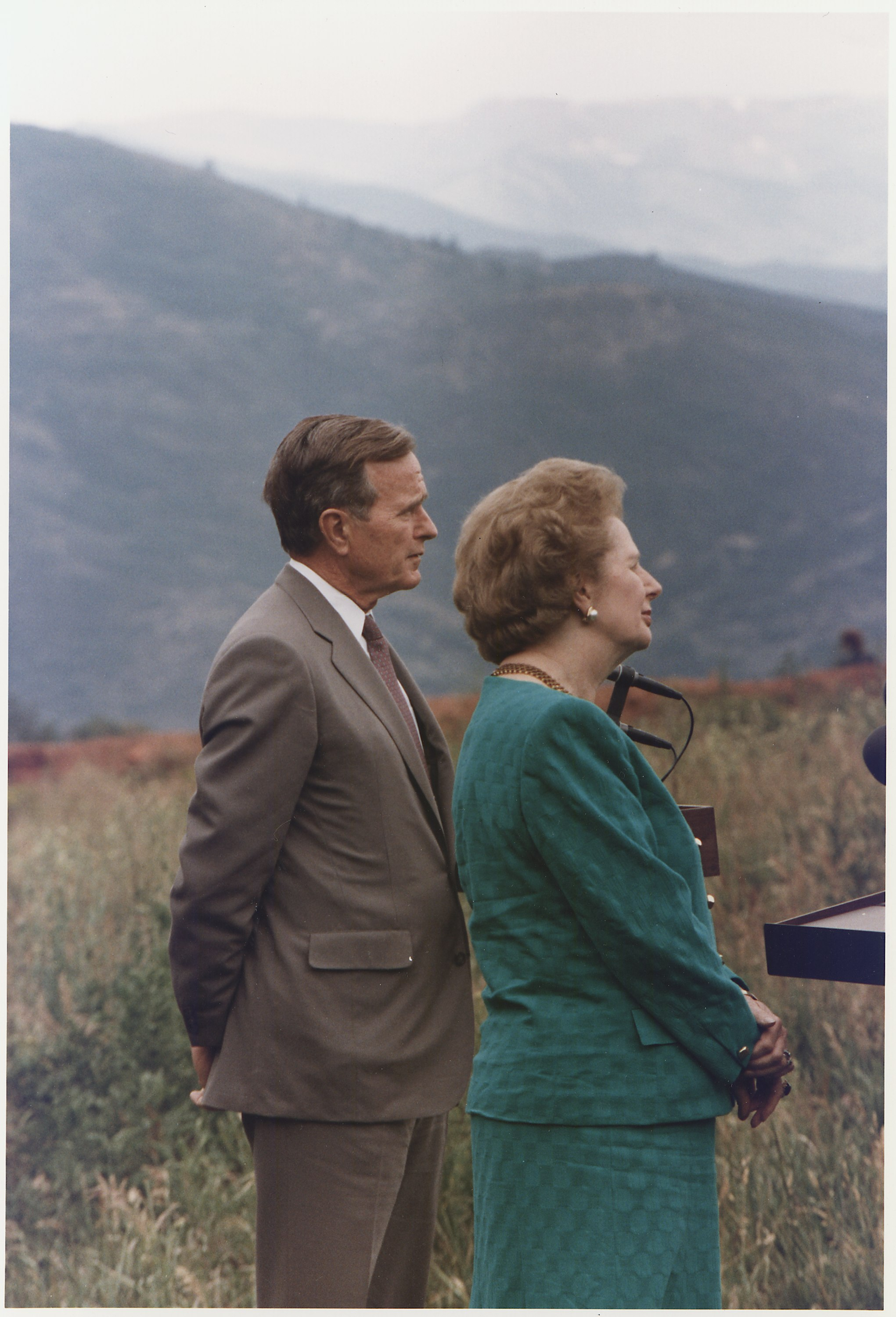
Thatcher with US President George H. W. Bush on the day of the invasion of Kuwait in 1990

The NATO nations were in general agreement on delicately handling the collapse of communism in Eastern Europe in 1989, the reunification of Germany in 1990–91, and the end of communism and the Soviet Union in 1991. There was no gloating or effort to humiliate Gorbachev. While US president George H. W. Bush wanted to make NATO more of a political than a military alliance, Thatcher spoke out for the importance of the military role. Like Mitterrand in France, she was nervous about the reunification of Germany, repeating the quip from Lord Ismay, NATO's first secretary-general: "The purpose of NATO is to keep the Americans in, the Russians out, and the Germans down." Thatcher and Mitterrand had a more specific worry. Bush said: "Margaret still feared the worst from reunification and, like Mitterrand, worried that the Germans might "go neutral" and refuse to permit stationing nuclear weapons on their soil." That is, Chancellor Kohl might trade neutralisation of united Germany as part of the price the Kremlin wanted to approve unification. In the event, Germany was reunited and there was no neutralisation.

Thatcher pushed President Bush to take strong military action in reversing Iraq's invasion of Kuwait in 1990, to which she sent over 45,000 troops. In the following year, they saw combat under her successor John Major in Operation Granby.

=== Decline and fall ===
==== 1989 leadership challenge ====
In November 1989, Thatcher was challenged for the Conservative Party's leadership by Sir Anthony Meyer, a 69-year-old back-bencher. As Meyer was a virtually unknown backbench MP, he was viewed as a "stalking horse" candidate for more prominent members of the party. Thatcher easily defeated Meyer's challenge, but there were sixty ballot papers either cast for Meyer or abstaining, a surprisingly large number for a sitting prime minister. However, her supporters in the Party viewed the results as a success, claiming that after ten years as prime minister and with approximately 370 Conservative MPs voting, the opposition was surprisingly small.

==== Poll tax ====
"Tories had always expected the switch from rates, paid by 18 million people, to a community charge, paid by 35 million, to be unpopular. Most in the party were ready to take a chance on something new, which they were told would bring high-spending Labour councils to heel by making them responsible to the voters. If it went wrong, they could always blame the councils."

— Nicholas Comfort, "The Tory Crisis: 'Concerned Hysteria' as Poll Tax Uproar Grow", The Independent on Sunday, p. 18, 4 March 1990

Thatcher was fiercely committed to a new tax—commonly called the "poll tax"—that would apply in equal amounts to rich and poor alike, despite intense public opposition. Her inability to compromise undermined her leadership in the Conservative Party, which turned decisively against her. Thatcher sought to relieve what she considered the unfair burden of property tax on the property-owning section of the population and outlined a fundamental solution as her flagship policy in the Conservative manifesto for the 1987 election. Local government rates (taxes) were replaced by the community charge, popularly known as the "poll tax", which levied a flat rate on all adult residents. Almost every adult, irrespective of income or wealth, paid the same, which would heavily redistribute the tax burden onto the less well-off.

She defended the poll tax, firstly, on the principle of marginality, that all voters should bear the burden of extra spending by local councils; secondly, on the benefit principle, that burdens should be proportional to benefits received. Ministers disregarded political research which showed potential massive losses for marginal Conservative-voting households.

The poll tax was introduced in Scotland in 1989 and England and Wales in 1990. This highly visible redistribution of the tax burden onto the less well-off proved to be one of the most controversial policies of Thatcher's premiership. Additional problems emerged when many of the tax rates set by local councils proved to be much higher than earlier predicted. Opponents organised to resist bailiffs and disrupt court hearings of community charge debtors. One Labour MP, Terry Fields, was jailed for 60 days for refusing to pay.

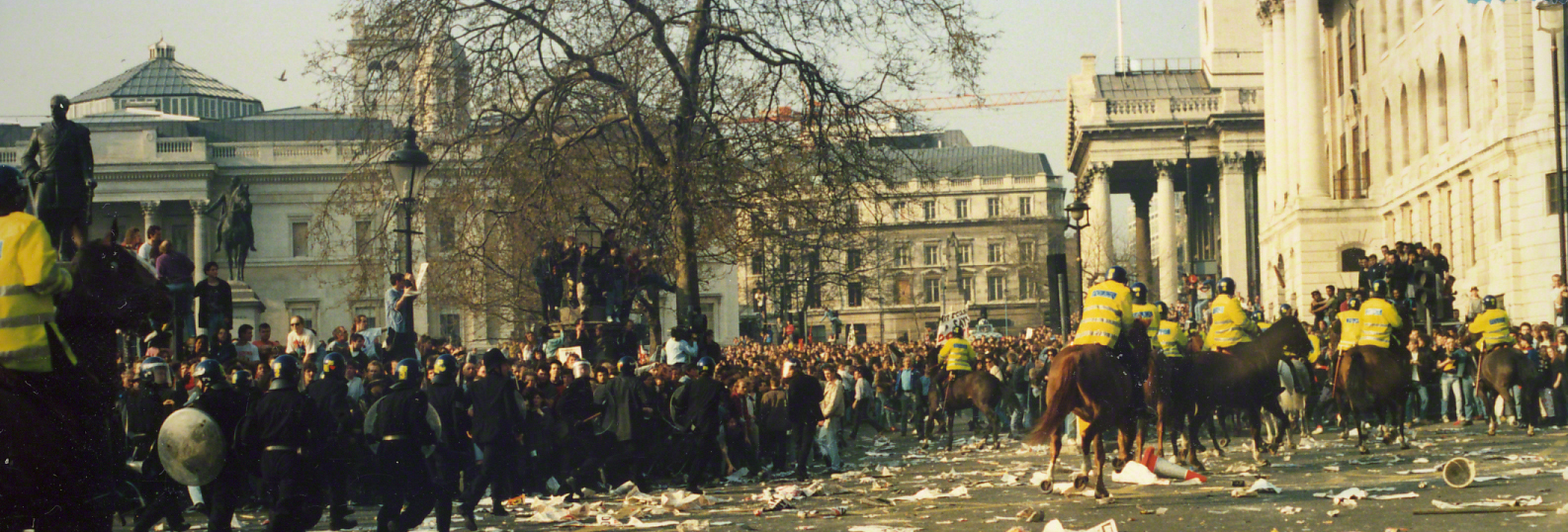
The unpopularity of the poll tax culminated in riots—most notably in Trafalgar Square on 31 March 1990.

An indication of the unpopularity of the policy was given by a Gallup poll in March 1990 that put Labour 18.5 points ahead. As the crisis deepened and the prime minister stood her ground, opponents claimed that up to 18 million people were refusing to pay. Enforcement measures became increasingly draconian. Unrest mounted and culminated in a number of riots. The most serious of these happened on 31 March 1990, during a protest at Trafalgar Square, London. More than 100,000 protesters attended and more than 400 people were arrested.

"What remains to be explained is why a politician who had hitherto shown such brilliant populist sensitivity should destroy herself with a tax reform which inflicted terrible damage on millions of people who had been in the front line of the Thatcher Revolution ... Either the government failed to understand what most research and many commentators were saying, or they did understand it and believed that they could, as the saying went, 'tough it out'. A third possibility is that ministers came to understand the electoral damage ahead, but were afraid to put the case strongly enough to a Prime Minister at the helm of her 'flagship'."

— Tony Travers, Politics and Economics of the Poll Tax, London School of Economics, p. 539

Labour continued to benefit from the situation as their lead in the opinion polls widened, and they made gains from the Tories in local council elections and more than once in by-elections. The new Liberal Democrats, after a weak start, were starting to gain ground in the opinion polls and seized the safe Eastbourne seat in its by-election in October.

Constitutional commentators concluded from the tax fiasco that "the British state [became] dangerously centralised, to an extent that important policy developments can now no longer be properly debated". The unpopularity of the poll tax came to be seen as an important factor in Thatcher's downfall, by convincing many Conservative backbenchers to vote against her when she was later challenged for the leadership by Michael Heseltine.

Following Thatcher's departure, her former chancellor Nigel Lawson labelled the poll tax as "the one great blunder of the Thatcher years". The succeeding Major government announced the abolition of the tax in spring 1991 and, in 1993, replaced it with Council Tax, a banded property tax similar in many respects to the older system of rates. Former trade-and-industry secretary Nicholas Ridley agreed that Thatcher had suffered a massive defeat over the poll tax, but he argued that Major's repeal "vindicated the rioters and those who had refused to pay. Lawlessness seemed to have paid off".

==== 1990 leadership challenge and resignation ====
"Having consulted widely among my colleagues, I have concluded that the unity of the Party and the prospects of victory in a General Election would be better served if I stood down to enable Cabinet colleagues to enter the ballot for the leadership. I should like to thank all those in Cabinet and outside who have given me such dedicated support."

— Margaret Thatcher, Resignation: MT resignation statement (PDF) (announces decision not to contest second ballot), 22 November 1990, archived from the original (PDF) on 12 July 2023

Thatcher's political "assassination" was, according to witnesses such as Alan Clark, one of the most dramatic episodes in British political history. The idea of a long-serving prime minister, undefeated at the polls, being ousted by an internal party ballot might, at first sight, seem bizarre. However, by 1990, opposition to Thatcher's policies on local government taxation, her Government's perceived mishandling of the economy (in particular the high interest rates of 15% that eroded her support among homeowners and business people), and the divisions opening in the Conservative Party over European integration made her seem increasingly politically vulnerable and her party increasingly divided. A Gallup poll in October 1990 showed that while Thatcher remained personally respected, there was overwhelming opposition towards her final initiatives, (Note: 83% disapproved of the Government's management of the National Health Service, 83% were against water privatisation, and 64% were against the Community Charge.) while various polls suggested the party was trailing Labour by between 6 and 11 points. Moreover, the prime minister's distaste for "consensus politics" and willingness to override colleagues' opinions, including that of her Cabinet, emboldened the backlash against her when it did occur.

"One certain beneficiary of Mrs Thatcher's radicalism has been the Labour party. She hoped to kill it, and, by 1983, it indeed seemed close to death. Instead, fear chastened it into accepting the disciplines of its new leader, Mr Neil Kinnock. True, Labour's 1983 humiliation owed much to the defection of right-wingers to form the Social Democratic party; but, in a sense, that too was her doing. Now, after years of gloomily watching her reverse the socialist 'ratchet', the Labour party has transformed itself. It has ditched unilateralism, hostility to the European Community and zeal for nationalisation. Labour as socialism is dead; as a political machine it is alive and well – and justifiably optimistic."

— Editorial, To the victor these spoils – The Economist reviews Margaret Thatcher's Years as Prime Minister, 24 November 1990, p. 19

On 1 November 1990, Sir Geoffrey Howe, one of Thatcher's oldest allies and longest-serving Cabinet member, resigned from his position as Deputy Prime Minister in protest at Thatcher's open hostility both to moves towards European federalism and to her own government's policy advocating a "hard ecu", i.e. a new European currency which competed alongside existing national currencies. In his resignation speech in the House of Commons two weeks later, he likened having to negotiate against what he called the "background noise" of her rhetoric to trying to play cricket despite the team captain having broken her own team's bats. He ended by suggesting that the time had come for "others to consider their own response to the tragic conflict of loyalties", with which he stated that he had wrestled "for perhaps too long".

Thatcher's former cabinet colleague Michael Heseltine then challenged her for the leadership of the party; she led the first round of voting by Conservative MPs (20 November) with just under 55% of the vote but fell four votes short of the 15% margin needed to win outright. Though she initially stated that she intended to contest the second ballot, most of Thatcher's Cabinet colleagues offered her at best lukewarm support, and many warned her that she would very likely lose a second ballot to Heseltine. On 22 November, at just after 9.30 am, she announced to the Cabinet that she would not be a candidate in the second ballot after all. Shortly afterwards, her staff made public what was, in effect, her resignation statement, in which she stated that she had "concluded that the unity of the Party and the prospects of victory in a General Election would be better served" if she stood down as prime minister.

Leader of the Opposition Neil Kinnock proposed a motion of no confidence in the Government, and Margaret Thatcher seized the opportunity this presented on the day of her resignation to deliver one of her most memorable performances. Among other quips, she famously noted: "a single currency is about the politics of Europe, it is about a federal Europe by the back door. So I shall consider the proposal of the Honourable Member for Bolsover [that she be the first governor of the new European Central Bank]. Now where were we? I am enjoying this".

She supported John Major as her successor, and after he had won the leadership contest, she formally resigned as prime minister on 28 November. In the years to come, her approval of Major would fall away. Following her resignation, a MORI poll found that 52% agreed with the proposition that "On balance she had been good for the country", while 48% disagreed thinking she had been bad. In 1991, she was given a long and unprecedented standing ovation at the party's annual conference, although she politely rejected calls from delegates for her to make a speech. She "all but shunned" the House of Commons after losing power and gave no clue as to her future plans. She retired from the House at the 1992 general election, at the age of 66 years and 33 years as an MP.

==== Record in perspective ====
External videos
- Booknotes
- "The Downing Street Years by Margaret Thatcher" (Interview), interviewed by Brian Lamb, Washington: C-SPAN, 5 December 1993
- "The Path to Power by Margaret Thatcher" (Interview), interviewed by Steve Scully, Washington: C-SPAN, 25 June 1995

Altogether, the eleven-year duration of her three terms in office make up the third to have outlasted a decade from start to finish, following Robert Walpole in the 1730s and William Pitt in the 1790s. Despite her electoral success in accumulating tens of millions of votes throughout Great Britain, only in Southern England and the Midlands did she ever win a majority of the popular vote. The misery index—the addition of the unemployment rate to the inflation rate—in the UK in November 1990 was "13.92", an 11.8% decrease from the rate of "15.57" in April 1979.

== Foreign policy overview ==
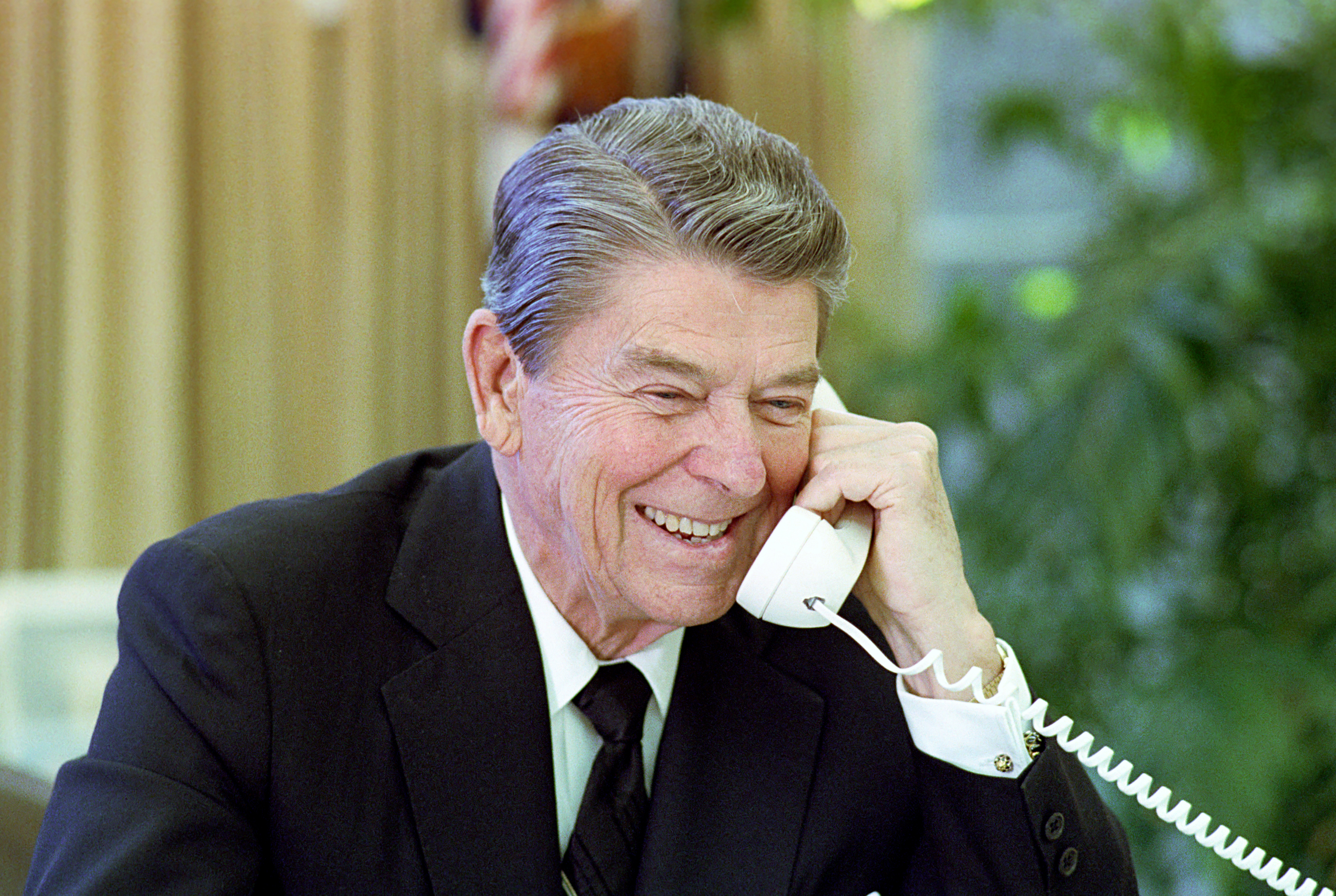
Thatcher developed a productive and active relationship with US president Ronald Reagan (pictured on the telephone with her in 1987).

Thatcher had broadened her interest in foreign policy since she became Conservative Party leader and would work with five foreign secretaries. (Note: Peter Carington, 6th Baron Carrington (until 1982); Francis Pym (1982–1983); Sir Geoffrey Howe (1983–1989); John Major (1989); and Douglas Hurd (from 1989).)

As prime minister, she cautiously moved closer to the European Community, tried to limit disinvestment from South Africa and agreed to return Hong Kong to China. Having long denounced Soviet communism, she escalated her attacks when it invaded Afghanistan. However, Thatcher would seek détente with the reformist Gorbachev; she later welcomed the collapse of communist regimes in Eastern Europe during 1989. She went to war with Argentina to recover the Falkland Islands, a move which strengthened the UK's relationship with the US government. She was also a leader in the coalition opposing Iraq's occupation of Kuwait. During her tenure, her government oversaw the independence of Southern Rhodesia, becoming Zimbabwe. and the New Hebrides, becoming Vanuatu in 1980. It also oversaw the independence of Saint Kitts and Nevis and British Honduras (becoming Belize) in 1981, Antigua and Barbuda in 1983 and the termination of Brunei as a protected state in 1984.

== Information released ==
=== From the National Archives ===
Under the thirty-year rule, various government documents relating to Thatcher's premiership have been declassified and released by the National Archives. These include:

==== GCSEs ====
Papers released in December 2014 show that Thatcher completely disapproved of GCSEs which, in 1986, Sir Keith Joseph was trying to introduce in the face of fierce opposition from teaching unions. At very least she wanted a two-year delay to ensure rigorous syllabuses and adequate teacher training. However, when the unions who had been involved in a pay dispute for two years further criticised reforms at their conference, Joseph persuaded her to go ahead immediately to avoid appearing to take their side. According to Dominic Cummings, special advisor to Michael Gove, it was a catastrophic decision which led to a collapse in the integrity of the exam system.

==== Cocaine production ====
In July 1989, Thatcher called for research on the use of biological weapons against cocaine producers in Peru, in the context of the feared crack cocaine epidemic among black British people. Carolyn Sinclair, a policy adviser, suggested that Thatcher proceed cautiously in working with black communities because she believed they gave cannabis to babies.

=== From inquiries ===
In February 2020, the Independent Inquiry into Child Sexual Abuse reported that Thatcher was made aware of child abuse allegations against Conservative MP Peter Morrison.

=== Spycatcher ===
In December 2023, files showed that Thatcher's government tried to block the release of Peter Wright's memoir Spycatcher in 1988.

=== Northern Ireland ===
In 2014, papers revealed that Thatcher's government had considered redrawing the UK border with the Republic of Ireland as one way to end the violence of the Troubles; this idea was quickly dismissed.

=== Lost files ===
In 2017, the British Foreign Office admitted that they lost hundreds of government files from the 1970s and 1980s, mainly relating to the Falkland Islands, Palestine and Northern Ireland.

== See also ==
- List of ministers under Margaret Thatcher
- Thatcherism
- Wets and dries
- Post-industrial society
- Presidency of Ronald Reagan
- First premiership of Mahathir Mohamad

== Notes ==
British premierships
Preceded by Callaghan	Thatcher premiership 1979–1990	Succeeded by Major
