= Opinion polling for the 1987 United Kingdom general election =

In the run-up to the 1987 general election, various organisations carried out opinion polling to gauge voting intention. Results of such polls are displayed in this article. The date range for these opinion polls are from the 1983 general election on 9 June until the 1987 general election on 10 June.

== Graphical summary ==
UK opinion polling for the election (trendline is local regression) Conservative Labour Liberal-SDP Alliance

== Polling results ==
All Data from UK polling Report

=== 1987 ===
Survey end date	Pollster	Client	Con	Lab	All	Lead
11 Jun	1987 general election		42.2%	30.8%	22.6%	11.4%
10 Jun	Marplan	The Guardian	42%	35%	21%	7%
10 Jun	MORI	The Times	44%	32%	22%	12%
9 Jun	Marplan	Today	43%	35%	21%	8%
9 Jun	Audience Selection	N/A	43%	34%	21%	9%
9 Jun	Gallup	The Daily Telegraph	41%	34%	23.5%	7%
9 Jun	Harris	TV-AM	42%	35%	21%	7%
8 Jun	Marplan	The Guardian	45%	32%	21%	13%
6 Jun	Harris	TV-AM	43%	33%	22%	10%
5 Jun	Marplan	Today	43%	35%	21%	8%
5 Jun	Gallup	The Sunday Telegraph	41.5%	34.5%	22.5%	7%
4 Jun	Marplan	The Guardian	44%	34%	20%	10%
4 Jun	Harris	The Observer	44%	33%	21%	11%
4 Jun	MORI	The Sunday Times	43%	32%	24%	11%
3 Jun	Gallup	The Daily Telegraph	40.5%	36.5%	21.5%	4%
1 Jun	Marplan	Today	44%	33%	21%	11%
31 May	Harris	N/A	42%	35%	21%	7%
29 May	Harris	TV-AM	45%	32%	22%	13%
29 May	Gallup	The Sunday Telegraph	41.5%	34%	22.5%	7.5%
28 May	Marplan	The Guardian	44%	32%	21%	12%
28 May	Harris	The Observer	41%	37%	21%	4%
28 May	MORI	The Sunday Times	44%	32%	23%	12%
27 May	Gallup	The Daily Telegraph	44.5%	36%	18%	8.5%
26 May	Marplan	Today	42%	35%	20%	7%
25 May	Harris	TV-AM	42%	37%	21%	5%
24 May	MORI	N/A	44%	31%	24%	13%
22 May	Gallup	The Sunday Telegraph	42%	33%	23%	9%
21 May	Marplan	The Guardian	41%	33%	21%	8%
21 May	Harris	TV-AM	43%	36%	20%	7%
21 May	MORI	The Sunday Times	44%	31%	24%	13%
21 May	Harris	The Observer	41%	34%	22%	7%
20 May	Gallup	N/A	42%	33%	23%	9%
20 May	NOP	N/A	41%	33%	23%	8%
18 May	Marplan	Today	41%	33%	24%	8%
18 May	The Dissolution of the 49th Parliament and campaigning officially begins					
17 May	Harris	TV-AM	42%	32%	24%	10%
15 May	Harris	The Observer	42%	33%	23%	9%
14 May	MORI	The Sunday Times	44%	30%	25%	14%
13 May	Marplan	Daily Express	41%	30%	26%	11%
12 May	Marplan	The Guardian	43%	29%	25%	14%
12 May	MORI	N/A	44%	31%	23%	13%
11 May	NOP	Evening Standard	46%	28%	25%	18%
11 May	Gallup	The Daily Telegraph	39%	28%	30%	9%
7 May	Harris	London Weekend Television	44%	33%	21%	11%
7 May	1987 local elections					
4 May	NOP	The Independent	39%	34%	25%	5%
3 May	Harris	TV-AM	44%	30%	25%	14%
30 Apr	MORI	The Sunday Times	44%	31%	23%	13%
27 Apr	Harris	Capital Radio	42%	31%	25%	11%
27 Apr	Marplan	Today	39%	33%	24%	6%
23 Apr	Harris	The Observer	42%	31%	25%	11%
15 Apr	NOP	Evening Standard	44%	29%	25%	15%
13 Apr	Gallup	The Daily Telegraph	40.5%	28%	29%	11.5%
12 Apr	MORI	Evening Standard	42%	29%	26%	13%
10 Apr	Marplan	Press Association	40%	30%	27%	10%
7 Apr	Marplan	The Guardian	38%	32%	27%	6%
5 Apr	Harris	TV-AM	43%	30%	26%	13%
2 Apr	MORI	The Sunday Times	41%	29%	29%	12%
2 Apr	Marplan	Daily Express	39%	29%	30%	9%
24 Mar	Marplan	Today	36%	31%	31%	5%
23 Mar	Gallup	The Daily Telegraph	37.5%	29.5%	31.5%	6%
20 Mar	MORI	The Sunday Times	39%	33%	26%	6%
19 Mar	Harris	The Observer	39%	33%	26%	6%
17 Mar	Gallup	The Sunday Telegraph	38.5%	30%	30.5%	8%
12 Mar	Truro by-election					
10 Mar	Marplan	The Guardian	38%	32%	27%	6%
10 Mar	MORI	The Sunday Times	41%	32%	25%	9%
2 Mar	NOP	Evening Standard	39%	34%	25%	5%
1 Mar	Harris	TV-AM	36%	33%	29%	3%
26 Feb	Greenwich by-election					
25 Feb	MORI	The Sunday Times	41%	35%	21%	6%
19 Feb	Harris	The Observer	39%	37%	23%	2%
16 Feb	Gallup	The Daily Telegraph	36%	34.5%	27.5%	1.5%
10 Feb	Marplan	The Guardian	38%	35%	25%	3%
10 Feb	MORI	The Sunday Times	39%	36%	23%	3%
9 Feb	NOP	Evening Standard	39%	37%	23%	2%
1 Feb	Harris	TV-AM	37%	39%	22%	2%
28 Jan	NOP	Channel 4	38%	40%	20%	2%
28 Jan	MORI	The Sunday Times	39%	38%	21%	1%
27 Jan	Marplan	Today	38.5%	38.5%	20%	Tie
22 Jan	Harris	The Observer	44%	36%	18%	8%
20 Jan	Gallup	The Daily Telegraph	34.5%	39.5%	23.5%	5%
14 Jan	NOP	Evening Standard	42%	37%	19%	5%
12 Jan	Marplan	The Guardian	38%	36%	23%	2%
11 Jan	Harris	TV-AM	42%	37%	20%	5%

=== 1986 ===
Survey end date	Pollster	Client	Con	Lab	All	Lead
30 Dec	MORI	The Sunday Times	39%	38%	21%	1%
15 Dec	Gallup	N/A	41%	32.5%	23.5%	8.5%
12 Dec	MORI	The Sunday Times	41%	39%	19%	2%
8 Dec	Marplan	The Guardian	39%	38%	21%	1%
7 Dec	Harris	TV-AM	41%	35%	22%	6%
3 Dec	NOP	N/A	41%	38%	19.5%	3%
26 Nov	MORI	Evening Standard	41%	39%	18%	2%
24 Nov	Marplan	Today	39%	38%	20%	1%
17 Nov	Gallup	The Daily Telegraph	36%	39.5%	22%	3.5%
13 Nov	Knowsley North by-election					
12 Nov	MORI	N/A	39%	41%	18%	2%
11 Nov	NOP	N/A	41%	38%	18%	3%
11 Nov	Marplan	The Guardian	39%	36%	23%	3%
4 Nov	MORI	The Sunday Times	40%	39%	18%	1%
2 Nov	Harris	TV-AM	40%	36%	21%	4%
24 Oct	Marplan	Press Association	41%	37.5%	19%	3.5%
22 Oct	MORI	Evening Standard	39%	41%	17%	2%
20 Oct	Gallup	The Daily Telegraph	37.5%	37.5%	22%	Tie
20 Oct	Marplan	Today	40%	41%	17%	1%
9 Oct	N/A	N/A	36%	39%	23%	3%
7 Oct	Marplan	The Guardian	36%	39%	23%	3%
3 Oct	Harris	The Observer	38%	41%	20%	3%
23 Sep	Marplan	Today	34%	40%	24%	6%
23 Sep	MORI	Evening Standard	35%	37%	26%	2%
15 Sep	Gallup	The Daily Telegraph	32.5%	38%	27.5%	5.5%
9 Sep	Marplan	The Guardian	34%	40%	24%	6%
27 Aug	Marplan	Today	35%	38%	24%	3%
19 Aug	MORI	Evening Standard	37%	37%	24%	Tie
11 Aug	Gallup	The Daily Telegraph	30%	36.5%	30%	6.5%
11 Aug	Marplan	The Guardian	32%	38%	27%	6%
31 Jul	MORI	The Times	32%	41%	25%	9%
29 Jul	Marplan	Today on S	29.5%	41%	27.5%	11.5%
22 Jul	MORI	Evening Standard	36%	37%	25%	1%
17 Jul	Newcastle-under-Lyme by-election					
14 Jul	Gallup	The Daily Telegraph	33%	38%	27%	5%
14 Jul	Marplan	The Guardian	31%	38%	28%	7%
24 Jun	MORI	Evening Standard	34%	40%	23%	6%
16 Jun	Gallup	The Daily Telegraph	34%	39%	24.5%	5%
16 Jun	Marplan	The Guardian	33%	39%	26%	6%
12 Jun	Harris	The Observer	31%	40%	25%	9%
21 May	MORI	Evening Standard	32%	40%	26%	8%
19 May	Marplan	The Guardian	28%	39%	30%	9%
12 May	Gallup	The Daily Telegraph	27.5%	37%	32.5%	4.5%
8 May	West Derbyshire & Ryedale by-elections					
8 May	1986 local elections					
2 May	MORI	The Sunday Times	36%	38%	23%	2%
22 Apr	MORI	Evening Standard	34%	39%	25%	5%
21 Apr	Gallup	The Daily Telegraph	33.5%	38%	26%	4.5%
14 Apr	Gallup	The Daily Telegraph	28%	38.5%	31.5%	7%
10 Apr	Fulham by-election					
8 Apr	Marplan	The Guardian	32%	35%	30%	3%
26 Mar	MORI	N/A	34%	36%	28%	2%
24 Mar	Gallup	The Daily Telegraph	29.5%	34%	34.5%	0.5%
21 Mar	MORI	The Sunday Times	31%	39%	28%	8%
10 Mar	Marplan	The Guardian	32%	35%	31%	3%
26 Feb	MORI	Evening Standard	34%	35%	30%	1%
12 Feb	MORI	The Sunday Times	33%	37%	29%	4%
10 Feb	Gallup	The Daily Telegraph	29.5%	35.5%	33.5%	2%
10 Feb	Marplan	The Guardian	27%	36%	35%	1%
24 Jan	Harris	The Observer	31%	36%	30%	5%
23 Jan	1986 Northern Ireland by-elections					
13 Jan	Gallup	The Daily Telegraph	29.5%	34%	35%	1%
12 Jan	Marplan	The Guardian	29%	36%	33%	3%
12 Jan	Harris	ITN	32%	33%	31%	2%
8 Jan	MORI	Evening Standard	33%	38%	28%	5%

=== 1985 ===
Survey end date	Pollster	Client	Con	Lab	All	Lead
9 Dec	Gallup	The Daily Telegraph	33%	32.5%	32.5%	0.5%
9 Dec	Marplan	The Guardian	35%	33%	30%	2%
8 Dec	MORI	N/A	35%	35%	28%	Tie
5 Dec	Tyne Bridge by-election					
24 Nov	MORI	Evening Standard	36%	36%	25%	Tie
11 Nov	Gallup	The Daily Telegraph	35%	34%	29.5%	1%
11 Nov	Marplan	The Guardian	34%	35%	29%	1%
21 Oct	Gallup	The Daily Telegraph	32%	38%	28%	6%
20 Oct	MORI	Evening Standard	37%	36%	25%	1%
19 Oct	NOP	Mail on Sunday	37%	34%	28%	3%
14 Oct	Marplan	The Guardian	32%	34%	32%	2%
4 Oct	Harris	The Observer	32%	39%	27%	7%
3 Oct	MORI	The Times	34%	36%	28%	2%
29 Sep	Harris	Thames	33%	32%	32%	1%
22 Sep	MORI	Evening Standard	30%	33%	35%	2%
16 Sep	Gallup	The Daily Telegraph	29%	29.5%	39%	9.5%
16 Sep	Marplan	The Guardian	31%	32%	36%	4%
8 Sep	MORI	Evening Standard	31%	37%	31%	6%
7 Sep	Harris	London Weekend Television	35%	36%	26%	1%
3 Sep	Marplan	The Guardian	30%	34%	35%	1%
18 Aug	MORI	Evening Standard	31%	35%	31%	4%
12 Aug	Gallup	The Daily Telegraph	24%	40%	34%	6%
12 Aug	Marplan	The Guardian	31%	36%	31%	5%
9 Aug	MORI	The Sunday Times	33%	37%	29%	4%
21 Jul	MORI	Evening Standard	33%	34%	31%	1%
15 Jul	Gallup	The Daily Telegraph	27.5%	38%	32.5%	5.5%
8 Jul	Marplan	The Guardian	31%	34%	33%	1%
4 Jul	Brecon and Radnor by-election					
23 Jun	MORI	Evening Standard	35%	36%	27%	1%
21 Jun	MORI	The Sunday Times	32%	40%	26%	8%
17 Jun	Gallup	The Daily Telegraph	34.5%	34.5%	30%	Tie
10 Jun	Marplan	The Guardian	31%	36%	32%	4%
26 May	MORI	Evening Standard	33%	35%	30%	2%
13 May	MORI	The Sunday Times	34%	36%	28%	2%
13 May	Gallup	The Daily Telegraph	30.5%	34%	33.5%	0.5%
13 May	Marplan	The Guardian	29%	35%	35%	Tie
2–15 May	1985 local elections					
28 Apr	MORI	Evening Standard	38%	37%	24%	1%
22 Apr	Gallup	The Daily Telegraph	34%	37.5%	26.5%	2.5%
15 Apr	Marplan	The Guardian	33%	38%	28%	5%
25 Mar	Gallup	The Daily Telegraph	33%	39.5%	25.5%	6.5%
24 Mar	MORI	Evening Standard	36%	40%	23%	4%
22 Mar	MORI	The Sunday Times	37%	39%	22%	2%
11 Mar	Marplan	The Guardian	36%	36%	27%	Tie
8 Mar	NOP	Mail on Sunday	35%	35%	26%	Tie
7 Mar	Harris	The Observer	40%	38%	19%	2%
25 Feb	Marplan	The Guardian	38%	36%	25%	2%
24 Feb	MORI	Evening Standard	39%	35%	24%	4%
18 Feb	MORI	London Weekend Television	38%	40%	19%	2%
11 Feb	Gallup	The Daily Telegraph	35%	32%	31.5%	3%
11 Feb	Marplan	The Guardian	38%	35%	26%	3%
6 Feb	MORI	The Sunday Times	37%	37%	24%	Tie
14 Jan	Gallup	The Daily Telegraph	39%	33%	25.5%	6%
14 Jan	Marplan	The Guardian	41%	33%	25%	8%
7 Jan	MORI	Evening Standard	42%	34%	21%	8%
8 Jan	NOP	Daily Mail	33%	38%	28%	5%

=== 1984 ===
Survey end date	Pollster	Client	Con	Lab	All	Lead
28 Dec	MORI	The Sunday Times	38%	36%	25%	2%
14 Dec	Enfield Southgate by-election					
10 Dec	Gallup	The Daily Telegraph	39.5%	31%	27.5%	8.5%
10 Dec	Marplan	The Guardian	41%	32%	26%	9%
10 Dec	MORI	N/A	40%	36%	22%	4%
7 Dec	MORI	The Sunday Times	41%	37%	20%	4%
19 Nov	MORI	Evening Standard	43%	35%	19%	8%
12 Nov	Gallup	The Daily Telegraph	44.5%	30.5%	23.5%	14%
5 Nov	Marplan	The Guardian	42%	33%	24%	9%
22 Oct	Gallup	The Daily Telegraph	44.5%	32%	21.5%	12.5%
22 Oct	MORI	Evening Standard	44%	35%	20%	9%
8 Oct	Marplan	The Guardian	38%	37%	23%	1%
4 Oct	MORI	The Sunday Times	43%	35%	19%	8%
24 Sep	Marplan	The Guardian	38%	36%	24%	2%
21 Sep	MORI	Evening Standard	42%	36%	20%	6%
11 Sep	Marplan	The Guardian	39%	38%	21%	1%
10 Sep	Gallup	The Daily Telegraph	37%	36%	25.5%	1%
10 Sep	MORI	The Times	40%	39%	19%	1%
29 Aug	MORI	The Sunday Times	39%	40%	19%	1%
20 Aug	MORI	Evening Standard	39%	39%	21%	Tie
13 Aug	Gallup	The Daily Telegraph	36%	39%	22.5%	3%
13 Aug	Marplan	The Guardian	36%	39%	24%	3%
23 Jul	MORI	N/A	37%	40%	20%	3%
16 Jul	Gallup	The Daily Telegraph	37.5%	38.5%	22%	1%
10 Jul	Marplan	The Guardian	34.5%	39%	25.5%	4.5%
25 Jun	MORI	Evening Standard	39%	39%	21%	Tie
16 Jun	Marplan	Sunday Mirror	38%	39%	22%	1%
14 Jun	Portsmouth South by-election					
14 Jun	1984 European Parliament election					
11 Jun	Gallup	The Daily Telegraph	37.5%	38%	23%	0.5%
11 Jun	Marplan	The Guardian	37%	38%	23%	1%
8 Jun	MORI	The Sunday Times	42%	38%	18%	4%
29 May	MORI	Evening Standard	40%	38%	21%	2%
14 May	Gallup	The Daily Telegraph	38.5%	36.5%	23%	2%
14 May	Marplan	The Guardian	38%	37%	23%	1%
3 May	Cynon Valley, Stafford and South West Surrey by-elections					
3 May	1984 local elections					
1 May	MORI	Evening Standard	40%	39%	20%	1%
25 Apr	MORI	The Sunday Times	42%	36%	20%	6%
17 Apr	Harris	The Observer	40%	36%	22%	4%
16 Apr	Gallup	The Daily Telegraph	41%	36.5%	20.5%	4.5%
16 Apr	Marplan	The Guardian	40%	37%	21%	3%
20 Mar	MORI	Evening Standard	41%	40%	17%	1%
19 Mar	Marplan	The Guardian	39%	39%	22%	Tie
19 Mar	Gallup	The Daily Telegraph	41%	38.5%	19.5%	2.5%
3 Mar	MORI	The Sunday Times	38%	41%	18%	3%
1 Mar	Chesterfield by-election					
20 Feb	MORI	Evening Standard	41%	38%	19%	3%
13 Feb	Gallup	The Daily Telegraph	43%	33.5%	21.5%	9.5%
13 Feb	Marplan	The Guardian	39%	40%	20%	1%
20 Jan	Harris	The Observer	43%	36%	18%	7%
20 Jan	NOP	Mail on Sunday	45%	33%	20%	12%
16 Jan	Gallup	The Daily Telegraph	41.5%	38%	19.5%	3.5%
16 Jan	Marplan	The Guardian	42%	38%	19%	4%
9 Jan	MORI	Evening Standard	42%	37%	19%	5%

=== 1983 ===
Survey end date	Pollster	Client	Con	Lab	All	Lead
17 Dec	MORI	The Sunday Times	40.5%	39.5%	18%	2%
12 Dec	Gallup	The Daily Telegraph	42.5%	36%	19.5%	6.5%
9 Dec	MORI	N/A	42%	37%	19%	5%
7 Dec	Marplan	The Guardian	41%	37%	21%	4%
3 Dec	MORI	The Sunday Times	44%	37%	18%	7%
21 Nov	MORI	N/A	39%	37%	22%	2%
14 Nov	Gallup	The Daily Telegraph	43.5%	36%	19.5%	7.5%
9 Nov	Marplan	The Guardian	42%	35%	22%	7%
7 Nov	NOP	Daily Mail	44%	32%	22%	12%
5 Nov	MORI	The Sunday Times	43%	35%	20%	8%
24 Oct	Gallup	The Daily Telegraph	42%	35.5%	20.5%	6.5%
24 Oct	MORI	Evening Standard	42%	37%	19%	5%
12 Oct	Marplan	The Guardian	42%	37%	20%	5%
6 Oct	Harris	The Observer	42%	39%	18%	3%
2 Oct	Neil Kinnock is elected leader of the Labour Party					
26 Sep	MORI	N/A	45%	27%	26%	18%
12 Sep	Gallup	The Daily Telegraph	45.5%	24.5%	29%	16.5%
22 Aug	MORI	Daily Star	46%	30%	22%	16%
15 Aug	Gallup	The Daily Telegraph	44.5%	25%	29%	15.5%
10 Aug	Marplan	The Guardian	45%	30%	24%	15%
28 Jul	Penrith and the Border by-election					
25 Jul	MORI	Daily Express	44%	30%	25%	14%
11 Jul	Gallup	The Daily Telegraph	44%	28.5%	26%	15.5%
20 Jun	MORI	Daily Star	43%	27%	29%	14%
13 Jun	David Owen becomes leader of the Social Democratic Party					
9 Jun	1983 general election		42.4%	27.6%	25.4%	14.8%
