= Worth Valley (ward) =

Local council ward in West Yorkshire, England

Coordinates: 53.81038°N 1.95440°W

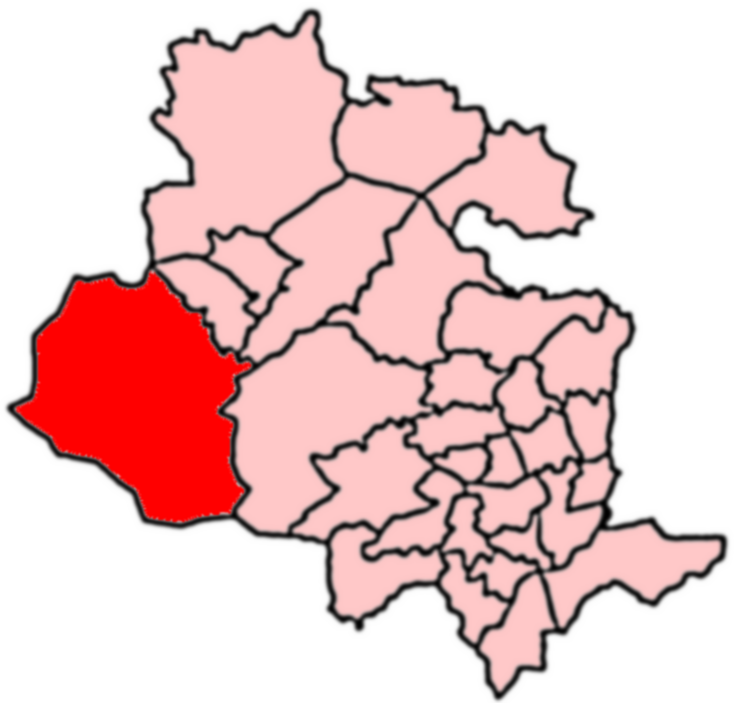
- 2004 Boundaries of Worth Valley Ward

- Location within West Yorkshire
- Population: 14,387 (2011 Census)
- OS grid reference: SE031349
- Metropolitan borough: City of Bradford
- Metropolitan county: West Yorkshire
- Region: Yorkshire and the Humber
- Country: England
- Sovereign state: United Kingdom
- Post town: KEIGHLEY
- Postcode district: BD22
- Dialling code: 01535
- Police: West Yorkshire
- Fire: West Yorkshire
- Ambulance: Yorkshire
- UK Parliament: Keighley
- Councillors: Chris Herd (Conservative); Rebecca Poulsen (Conservative); Russell Brown (Conservative)

Worth Valley is a ward in the City of Bradford Metropolitan District Council, West Yorkshire. The population of the ward taken at the 2011 Census was 14,387. It is named after the valley that the River Worth that runs through to the town of Keighley, where it joins the River Aire. In the north it is bounded by North Yorkshire, in the west by Lancashire and in the south by Calderdale District.

== Ward ==
Worth Valley ward is a semi-rural area and the largest of the six wards that make up the constituency of Keighley in West Yorkshire. Historically, it elects mostly Conservative councillors, except in 2004, when a representative of the British National Party was returned to Bradford District Council. The previous councillor stated that this was a protest vote that "went disastrously wrong."

It contains the Keighley villages of Oakworth, Oldfield, Haworth, Cross Roads, Oxenhope and Stanbury; areas of farmland; and large expanses of moorland. Its attractive villages, particularly Haworth and its Pennine landscape are at the heart of Brontë Country and attract many visitors.

== Councillors ==
Worth Valley ward is represented on Bradford Council by three Conservative councillors; Chris Herd, Rebecca Poulsen, and Russell Brown . In 2017, before the 2018 elections, Glen Miller was deselected as a prospective councillor by the Keighley and Ilkley Conservative Association. Miller stated that he tended to speak his mind and that he had disagreed with a policy about letting members of other political parties leave and join the Conservatives.

Election	Councillor	Councillor	Councillor
2004	Christopher Neil Kirby (BNP)	Peter Henry Hill (Con)	Kirstan Frederick Hopkins (Con)
2006	Glen William Miller (Con)	Matthew James Steven Palmer (Con)	Kirstan Hopkins (Con)
2007	Glen Miller (Con)	Matt Palmer (Con)	Kirstan Hopkins (Con)
2008	Glen Miller (Con)	Matt Palmer (Con)	Kirstan Hopkins (Con)
May 2010	Glen Miller (Con)	Matt Palmer (Con)	Kirstan Hopkins (Con)
By-election; 25 November 2010	Glen Miller (Con)	Matt Palmer (Con)	Russell Brown (Con)
2011	Glen Miller (Con)	Rebecca Poulsen (Con)	Russell Brown (Con)
2012	Glen Miller (Con)	Rebecca Poulsen (Con)	Russell Brown (Con)
2014	Glen Miller (Con)	Rebecca Poulsen (Con)	Russell Brown (Con)
2015	Glen Miller (Con)	Rebecca Poulsen (Con)	Russell Brown (Con)
2016	Glen Miller (Con)	Rebecca Poulsen (Con)	Russell Brown (Con)
2018	Chris Herd (Con)	Rebecca Poulsen (Con)	Russell Brown (Con)
2019	Chris Herd (Con)	Rebecca Poulsen (Con)	Russell Brown (Con)
2021	Chris Herd (Con)	Rebecca Poulsen (Con)	Russell Brown (Con)
2022	Chris Herd (Con)	Rebecca Poulsen (Con)	Russell Brown (Con)
2023	Chris Herd (Con)	Rebecca Poulsen (Con)	Russell Brown (Con)
2024	Chris Herd (Con)	Rebecca Poulsen (Con)	Russell Brown (Con)

indicates seat up for re-election. indicates a by-election.

== Notable people with Worth Valley links ==
The following people were born in the Worth Valley, have lived there in the past or are currently resident in the valley.

- Brontë Sisters, lived in the village of Haworth
  - Anne. (1820–1849), Novelist
  - Charlotte, (1816–1855), Novelist
  - Emily, (1818–1848), Novelist
- Branwell Brontë, (1817–1848), painter and poet
- Rev Patrick Brontë, (1777–1861), clergyman and writer
- Eric Pickles, Conservative MP, started his political career as a councillor in the Worth Valley Ward
