= 2006 City of Bradford Metropolitan District Council election =

- 4 May 2006

One third of seats (32 of 90) to City of Bradford Metropolitan District Council 46 seats needed for a majority
	First party	Second party	Third party
Party	Labour	Conservative	Liberal Democrats
Seats won	15	11	4
Seats after	36	33	14
Seat change	▲5	▼3	▼1
Popular vote	41,212	42,815	28,579
Percentage	30.4%	31.6%	21.1%
Swing	▲3.5%	▼0.1%	▼2.2%
	Fourth party	Fifth party
Party	BNP	Green
Seats won	1	1
Seats after	3	4
Seat change	▼1	Steady
Popular vote	18,212	4,813
Percentage	13.4%	3.5%
Swing	▲6.4%	▼3.6%
- Map of the 2006 Bradford council election results. Labour in red, Conservatives in blue, Liberal Democrats in yellow, BNP in dark blue and Greens in green.
Majority party before election
No overall control
Majority party after election
No overall control

The 2006 City of Bradford Metropolitan District Council elections took place on 4 May 2006.

== Election results ==
Bradford local election result 2006
Party	Seats	Gains	Losses	Net gain/loss	Seats %	Votes %	Votes	+/−
Labour	15	6	1	▲5	46.9	30.4	41,212	▲3.5
Conservative	11	2	5	▼3	34.4	31.6	42,815	▼0.1
Liberal Democrats	4	1	2	▼1	12.5	21.1	28,579	▼2.2
BNP	1	1	2	▼1	3.1	13.4	18,212	▲6.4
Green	1	0	0	Steady	3.1	3.5	4,813	▼3.6

== Ward results ==
An asterisk denotes an incumbent

=== Baildon ward ===
Baildon
Party	Candidate	Votes	%	±%
Conservative	Valerie Townend*	2,595	48.3	
Liberal Democrats	Christine Briggs	2,120	39.5	
Green	Jonathan Hayes	417	7.8	
Labour	Mohammad Yaqoob	237	4.4	
Majority		475	8.8	
Turnout		5,369	46.17	
Conservative hold		Swing		

=== Bingley ward ===
Bingley
Party	Candidate	Votes	%	±%
Conservative	David Heseltine*	2,941	54.1	
Labour	Frank Needham	1,133	20.8	
Green	Arthur Arnold	691	12.7	
Liberal Democrats	Margaret Fielden	676	12.4	
Majority		1,808	33.2	
Turnout		5,441	43.59	
Conservative hold		Swing		

=== Bingley Rural ward ===
Bingley Rural
Party	Candidate	Votes	%	±%
Conservative	Michael Ellis	2,861	51.0	
BNP	Nicholas Stamp	1,085	19.3	
Labour	James Newton	945	16.8	
Liberal Democrats	Alan Sykes	718	12.8	
Majority		1,776	31.7	
Turnout		5,609	42.23	
Conservative hold		Swing		

=== Bolton & Undercliffe ward ===
Bolton and Undercliffe
Party	Candidate	Votes	%	±%
Liberal Democrats	David Gray*	2,146	56.7	
Labour	Anthony Niland	958	25.3	
Conservative	John Robertshaw	679	17.9	
Majority		1,188	31.4	
Turnout		3,783	34.49	
Liberal Democrats hold		Swing		

=== Bowling & Barkerend ward ===
Bowling and Barkerend
Party	Candidate	Votes	%	±%
Conservative	Zameer Shah*	1,792	38.1	
Labour	Raymond Bage	1,289	27.4	
Liberal Democrats	Mukhtar Ali	989	21.0	
BNP	Sharif Gawad	630	13.4	
Majority		503	10.7	
Turnout		4,700	40.87	
Conservative gain from Liberal Democrats		Swing		

=== Bradford Moor ward ===
Bradford Moor
Party	Candidate	Votes	%	±%
Labour	Mohammed Shafiq	2,129	42.4	
Conservative	Azhar Mahmood	1,486	29.6	
Liberal Democrats	Ali Jamal	1,410	28.1	
Majority		643	12.8	
Turnout		5,025	44.86	
Labour hold		Swing		

=== City ward ===
City
Party	Candidate	Votes	%	±%
Labour	Munir Ahmed	2,413	68.8	
Liberal Democrats	Tahir Mahmood	420	12.0	
Conservative	Daniel Paterson	350	10,0	
Green	John Robinson	324	9.2	
Majority		1,993	56.8	
Turnout		3,507	32.17	
Labour gain from Conservative		Swing		

=== Clayton & Fairweather Green ward ===
Clayton & Fairweather Green
Party	Candidate	Votes	%	±%
Conservative	David Servant*	1,269	29.8	
Labour	Peter Longthorn	1,218	28.6	
BNP	Kim Riach	1,106	26.0	
Liberal Democrats	Lorna Leeming	665	15.6	
Majority		51	1.2	
Turnout		4,258	39.27	
Conservative hold		Swing		

=== Craven ward ===
Craven
Party	Candidate	Votes	%	±%
Conservative	Andrew Mallinson*	2,636	60.1	
Labour	Steven Carter	1,000	22.8	
Liberal Democrats	Frances McAulay	751	17.1	
Majority		1,636	37.3	
Turnout		4,387	36.01	
Conservative hold		Swing		

=== Eccleshill ward ===
Eccleshill
Party	Candidate	Votes	%	±%
Liberal Democrats	Colin McPhee	1,205	30.2	
BNP	Peter Wade	1,142	28.6	
Labour	Gillian Thornton	920	23.0	
Conservative	David James	728	18.2	
Majority		63	1.6	
Turnout		3,995	35.32	
Liberal Democrats gain from Labour		Swing		

=== Great Horton ward ===
Two seats were contested after incumbent councillor Intkhab Alam was jailed in March 2006 for trying to pervert the course of justice after his minicab hit and killed a man.

Great Horton
Party	Candidate	Votes	%	±%
Labour	Joanne Dodds	1,772		
Labour	John Godward	1,577		
Conservative	Richard Milczanowski	1,219		
Conservative	Darryl Brock	1,017		
Liberal Democrats	Margaret Chadwick	746		
Liberal Democrats	Antony Habergham	659		
Majority				
Turnout		3,848	35.02	
Labour gain from Conservative		Swing		
Labour hold		Swing		

=== Heaton ward ===
Heaton
Party	Candidate	Votes	%	±%
Conservative	Mohammad Masood	1,477	32.8	
Labour	Mark Fielding	1,144	25.4	
Green	Steven Schofield	1,043	23.2	
Liberal Democrats	Tariq Mahmood	833	18.5	
Majority		333	7.4	
Turnout		4,497	44.89	
Conservative hold		Swing		

=== Idle & Thackley ward ===
Idle and Thackley
Party	Candidate	Votes	%	±%
Liberal Democrats	David Ward	2,604		
Liberal Democrats	Alun Griffiths	2,004		
Conservative	Derek Taylor	993		
BNP	Leslie Nakonecznyi	904		
Labour	Richard Blackburn	703		
Labour	Rosemary Watson	578		
Majority				
Turnout		4,503	38.67	
Liberal Democrats hold		Swing		
Liberal Democrats hold		Swing		

=== Ilkley ward ===
Ilkley
Party	Candidate	Votes	%	±%
Conservative	Colin Powell	2,760	58.1	
Labour	Andrew Dundas	1,092	23.0	
Liberal Democrats	Douglas Beaumont	896	18.9	
Majority		1,668	35.1	
Turnout		4,748	42.56	
Conservative hold		Swing		

=== Keighley Central ward ===
Keighley Central
Party	Candidate	Votes	%	±%
Labour	Shamim Akhtar	2,367	45.3	
Liberal Democrats	Kaneez Akhtar	1,455	27.9	
Conservative	Russell Brown	1,400	26.8	
Majority		912	17.5	
Turnout		5,222	49.14	
Labour hold		Swing		

=== Keighley East ward ===
Keighley East
Party	Candidate	Votes	%	±%
Labour	Stephen Pullen	1,954	39.3	
Conservative	Mark Francis Startin	1,364	27.5	
BNP	Rose Thompson	1,084	21.8	
Liberal Democrats	Judith Brooksbank	564	11.4	
Majority		590	11.9	
Turnout		4,966	42.55	
Labour hold		Swing		

=== Keighley West ward ===
Keighley West
Party	Candidate	Votes	%	±%
Labour	Catherine Rowen	1,827	40.4	
BNP	Ian Dawson	1,493	33.0	
Conservative	Lionel Lockley	822	18.2	
Liberal Democrats	Victoria Salmons	384	8.5	
Majority		334	7.4	
Turnout		4,526	41.08	
Labour hold		Swing		

=== Little Horton ward ===
Little Horton
Party	Candidate	Votes	%	±%
Labour	Naveeda Ikram	2,456	68.4	
Conservative	Asad Malik	610	17.0	
Liberal Democrats	John Massen	525	14.6	
Majority		1,846	51.4	
Turnout		3,591	34.80	
Labour hold		Swing		

=== Manningham ward ===
Manningham
Party	Candidate	Votes	%	±%
Labour	Shabir Hussain	2,212	46.8	
Liberal Democrats	Qasim Khan	2,160	45.7	
Conservative	Ishtiaq Ahmed	354	7.5	
Majority		52	1.1	
Turnout		4,726	45.51	
Labour gain from Conservative		Swing		

=== Queensbury ward ===
Queensbury
Party	Candidate	Votes	%	±%
BNP	Paul Cromie	1,829	38.5	
Conservative	Tracey McNulty*	1,533	32.3	
Labour	Graham Mahony	935	19.7	
Liberal Democrats	Joan Collins	455	9.6	
Majority		296	6.2	
Turnout		4,752	42.52	
BNP gain from Conservative		Swing		

=== Royds ward ===
Royds
Party	Candidate	Votes	%	±%
Labour	Valerie Slater	1,393	36.8	
BNP	Lynda Jane Cromie	1,250	33.0	
Conservative	Richard Sheard	748	19.7	
Liberal Democrats	Edward Hallmann	397	10.5	
Majority		143	3.8	
Turnout		3,788	34.02	
Labour hold		Swing		

=== Shipley ward ===
Shipley
Party	Candidate	Votes	%	±%
Green	Hawarun Hussain	1,875	36.7	
Conservative	John Carroll	1,299	25.4	
Labour	Lee Edwards	759	14.8	
BNP	Jennifer Sampson	747	14.6	
Liberal Democrats	John Hall	435	8.5	
Majority		576	11.3	
Turnout		5,115	47.60	
Green hold		Swing		

=== Thornton & Allerton ward ===
Thornton and Allerton
Party	Candidate	Votes	%	±%
Conservative	Valerie Binney	1,543	34.0	
BNP	Clifford Cockayne	1,354	29.9	
Labour	Susanne Rooney	942	20.8	
Liberal Democrats	Ruth Sharples	401	8.8	
Green	Michael Rawnsley	293	6.5	
Majority		189	4.2	
Turnout		4,533	39.86	
Conservative hold		Swing		

=== Toller ward ===
Toller
Party	Candidate	Votes	%	±%
Labour	Imran Hussain	2,428	42.6	
Conservative	Amjad Hussain*	1,786	31.4	
Liberal Democrats	Mohammed Sengal	1,480	26.0	
Majority		642	11.3	
Turnout		5,694	50.97	
Labour gain from Conservative		Swing		

=== Tong ward ===
Tong
Party	Candidate	Votes	%	±%
Labour	James Anthony Cairns	1,278	40.4	
BNP	Arthur Redfearn	1,012	32.0	
Conservative	Robert Stead	508	16.1	
Liberal Democrats	Maralyn Adey	366	11.6	
Majority		266	8.4	
Turnout		3,164	28.00	
Labour hold		Swing		

=== Wharfedale ward ===
Wharfedale
Party	Candidate	Votes	%	±%
Conservative	Christopher Ian Greaves	2,571	61.7	
Liberal Democrats	Vernon Whelan	1,028	24.7	
Labour	Kevin Armstrong	568	13.6	
Majority		1,543	37.0	
Turnout		4,167	46.14	
Conservative hold		Swing		

=== Wibsey ward ===
Wibsey
Party	Candidate	Votes	%	±%
Labour	Lynne Eleanor Smith	1,427	34.6	
BNP	Andrew Clarke	1,251	30.4	
Conservative	Dorothy Craven	928	22.5	
Liberal Democrats	Susan Fletcher	513	12.5	
Majority		176	4.3	
Turnout		4,119	39.33	
Labour gain from BNP		Swing		

=== Windhill & Wrose ward ===
Windhill and Wrose
Party	Candidate	Votes	%	±%
Labour	Vanda Greenwood	1,215	28.2	
Liberal Democrats	John Watmough	1,166	27.0	
BNP	Neil Craig	1,022	23.7	
Conservative	David Herdson	738	17.1	
Green	Linda Arnold	170	3.9	
Majority		49	1.1	
Turnout		4,311	40.01	
Labour hold		Swing		

=== Worth Valley ward ===
Worth Valley
Party	Candidate	Votes	%	±%
Conservative	Glen William Miller	1,790	37.9	
Labour	Trevor Lindley	1,225	26.0	
BNP	John Joy	1,161	24.6	
Liberal Democrats	James Main	543	11.5	
Majority		565	12.0	
Turnout		4,719	45.22	
Conservative gain from BNP		Swing		

=== Wyke ward ===
Wyke
Party	Candidate	Votes	%	±%
Labour	David Warburton	1,273	32.0	
BNP	Robert Manby	1,142	28.7	
Conservative	John Stead	1,035	26.0	
Liberal Democrats	Kevin Hall	528	13.3	
Majority		131	3.3	
Turnout		3,978	37.86	
Labour hold		Swing		
