= Great Horton =

Ward of Bradford, West Yorkshire, England

Coordinates: 53.782°N 1.796°W

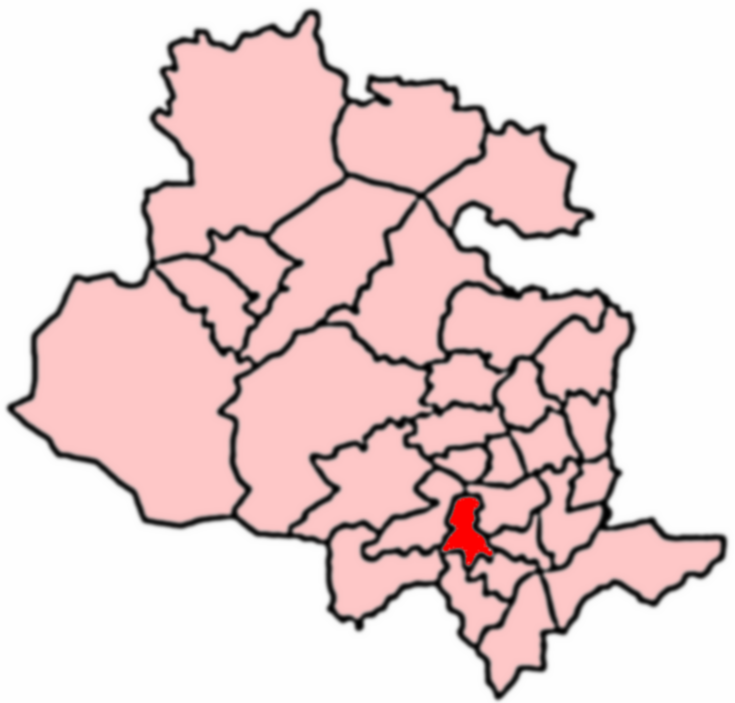
- Great Horton Ward 2004
- Population: 17,683 (Ward. 2011 census)
- Metropolitan county: West Yorkshire
- Region: Yorkshire and the Humber
- Country: England
- Sovereign state: United Kingdom
- UK Parliament: Bradford South
- Councillors: Joanne Dodds (Labour); Tariq Hussain (Labour); Abdul Jabar (Labour)

Great Horton is a ward of the City of Bradford, West Yorkshire, England, with a population of 17,683 at the 2011 Census.

Great Horton is west of Bradford and east of the village of Clayton and also includes Scholemore, Paradise Green, Lidget Green and Pickles Hill. Horton Bank Bottom, Horton Bank, and to some extent itself extends into neighbouring wards.

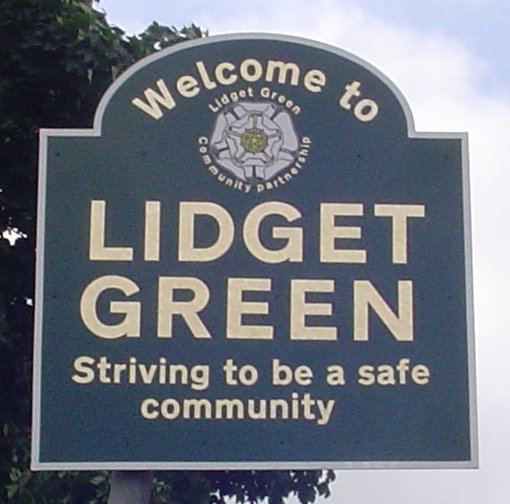
Signpost in Lidget Green

== Councillors ==
Great Horton electoral ward is represented on Bradford Council by three Labour Party councillors, Joanne Dodds, Tariq Hussain and Abdul Jabar.

Election	Councillor	Councillor	Councillor
2004	Intkhab Alam (Con)	John Derek Godward (Lab)	Paul John Flowers (Lab)
2006	Joanne Margaret Dodds (Lab)	John Godward (Lab)	Paul Flowers (Lab)
2007	Joanne Dodds (Lab)	John Godward (Lab)	Paul Flowers (Lab)
2008	Joanne Dodds (Lab)	John Godward (Lab)	Paul Flowers (Lab)
2010	Joanne Dodds (Lab)	John Godward (Lab)	Paul Flowers (Lab)
May 2011	Joanne Dodds (Lab)	John Godward (Lab)	Paul Flowers (Lab)
By-election; 24 November 2011	Joanne Dodds (Lab)	John Godward (Lab)	Abdul Jabar (Lab)
2012	Joanne Dodds (Lab)	John Godward (Lab)	Abdul Jabar (Lab)
2014	Joanne Dodds (Lab)	John Godward (Lab)	Abdul Jabar (Lab)
2015	Joanne Dodds (Lab)	Tariq Hussain (Lab)	Abdul Jabar (Lab)
2016	Joanne Dodds (Lab)	Tariq Hussain (Lab)	Abdul Jabar (Lab)

indicates seat up for re-election. indicates a by-election.

== See also ==
- Listed buildings in Bradford (Great Horton Ward)
