= Keighley Central =

Coordinates: 53.866°N 1.904°W

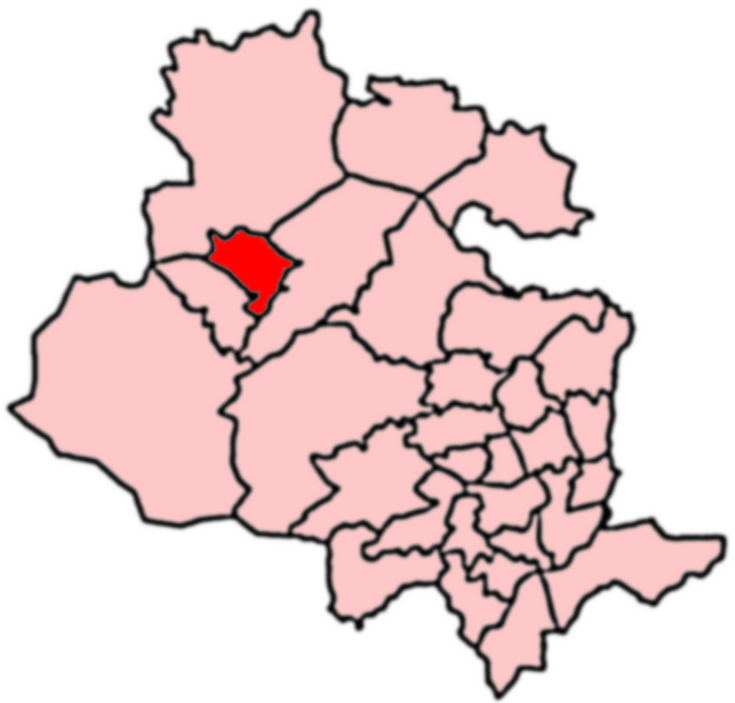
- 2004 Boundaries of Keighley Central Ward

- Location within West Yorkshire
- Population: 18,255 (Ward.2011)
- OS grid reference: SE063411
- Metropolitan county: West Yorkshire
- Region: Yorkshire and the Humber
- Country: England
- Sovereign state: United Kingdom
- UK Parliament: Keighley
- Councillors: Mohsin Hussain (Labour); Zafar Ali (Independent); Mohammed Nazam (Conservative)

Keighley Central is a ward in City of Bradford Metropolitan District Council in the county of West Yorkshire, England. Its population is 16,276 as per the United Kingdom Census 2001, increasing to 18,255 at the 2011 Census.

It contains the centre of Keighley, together with residential areas to its north west such as Utley. It has a large Pakistani community, which was measured at 43.3% of the local population in the 2011 Census. White British residents were the second largest group with 38.7% of the population at that time.

== Councillors ==
Keighley Central ward is represented on Bradford Council by three councillors, Mohsin Hussain, Zafar Ali and Mohammed Nazam .

- Mohsin Hussain (Labour)
- Zafar Ali (Independent)
- Mohammed Nazam (Conservative)

Election	Councillor	Councillor	Councillor
2004	John Morris Prestage (Lab)	Lynne Joyce (Lab)	Khadim Hussain (Lab)
2006	Shamim Akhtar (Lab)	Lynne Joyce (Lab)	Khadim Hussain (Lab)
2007	Shamim Akhtar (Lab)	Zafar Ali (Con)	Khadim Hussain (Lab)
2008	Shamim Akhtar (Lab)	Zafar Ali (Con)	Khadim Hussain (Lab)
2010	Abid Hussain (Lab)	Zafar Ali (Con)	Khadim Hussain (Lab)
2011	Abid Hussain (Lab)	Kaneez Akthar (Lab)	Khadim Hussain (Lab)
2012	Abid Hussain (Lab)	Kaneez Akthar (Lab)	Khadim Hussain (Lab)
2014	Abid Hussain (Lab)	Kaneez Akthar (Lab)	Khadim Hussain (Lab)
2015	Abid Hussain (Lab)	Zafar Ali (Con)	Khadim Hussain (Lab)
2016	Abid Hussain (Lab)	Zafar Ali (Con)	Khadim Hussain (Lab)
2018	Abid Hussain (Lab)	Zafar Ali (Con)	Khadim Hussain (Lab)
2019	Abid Hussain (Lab)	Zafar Ali (Con	Khadim Hussain (Ind)
2021	Mohsin Hussain (Lab)	Zafar Ali (Con)	Mohammed Nazam (Con)
2022	Mohsin Hussain (Lab)	Zafar Ali (Ind)	Mohammed Nazam (Con)

indicates seat up for re-election.
