= Thornton and Allerton =

Coordinates: 53.802°N 1.834°W

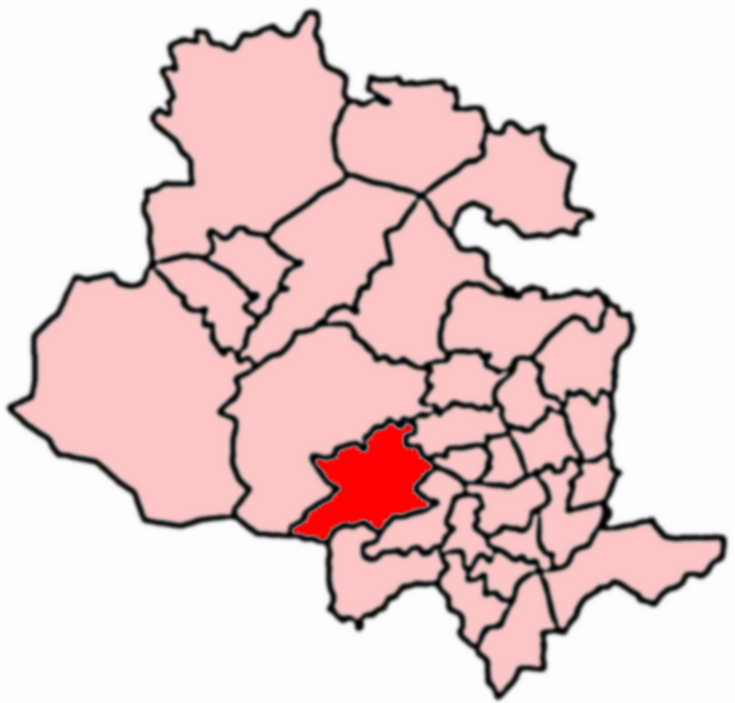
- 2004 Boundaries of the Thornton and Allerton Ward
- Population: 18,520
- UK Parliament: Bradford West
- Councillors: Karen Regan (Labour); Sue Duffy (Labour); Beverley Mullaney (Labour)

Thornton and Allerton (population 18,520 - 2023 ward profile) is a ward within the City of Bradford Metropolitan District Council in the county of West Yorkshire, England, named after the villages of Thornton and Allerton around which it is drawn.

The population has increased considerably over the past 20 years, with an increase of nearly a fifth (3,000) from the 2001 UK census. The ward has also urbanised considerably, particularly in Allerton, which has contributed to a notable swing from Conservative to Labour in the last decade, and can be described as primarily suburban.

As well as the villages of Thornton and Allerton, the ward includes the smaller village of Sandy Lane, hamlets of Keelham and Little Egypt, and neighbourhoods of Stony Lane, Broom Hill, School Green and Leaventhorpe.

== Councillors ==
Thornton and Allerton ward is represented on Bradford Council by three Reform UK councillors: Lester Graham Martin, Melanie Jane Milnes, and John Sharples. The area has swung considerably from Conservative to Labour over the last 10 years, with all three Conservative councillors between 2014 and 2016 being replaced by Labour candidates, whose majorities all increased with swings of at least 5% in their subsequent re-elections. The early 2020s saw this trend consolidate, with Conservative candidates rarely exceeding one-quarter of the vote. However, in 2026, Reform UK candidates gained all three seats, with a swing of over 25%, from Labour.

Election	Councillor	Councillor	Councillor
2004	Valerie Binney (Con)	Michael Evan McCabe (Con)	Clive Thomas Richardson (Con)
2006	Valerie Binney (Con)	Michael McCabe (Con)	Clive Richardson (Con)
2007	Valerie Binney (Con)	Michael McCabe (Con)	Clive Richardson (Con)
2008	Valerie Binney (Con)	Michael McCabe (Con)	Charles Sykes (Con)
2010	Valerie Binney (Con)	Michael McCabe (Con)	Charles Sykes (Con)
2011	Valerie Binney (Con)	Michael McCabe (Con)	Charles Sykes (Con)
2012	Valerie Binney (Con)	Michael McCabe (Con)	Charles Sykes (Con)
2014	Richard Lee Dunbar (Lab)	Michael McCabe (Con)	Charles Sykes (Con)
2015	Richard Dunbar (Lab)	Sue Duffy (Lab)	Charles Sykes (Con)
2016	Richard Dunbar (Lab)	Sue Duffy (Lab)	Beverley Winifred Mullaney (Lab)
2018	Richard Dunbar (Lab)	Sue Duffy (Lab)	Beverley Winifred Mullaney (Lab)
2019	Richard Dunbar (Lab)	Sue Duffy (Lab)	Beverley Winifred Mullaney (Lab)
2021	Richard Dunbar (Lab)	Sue Duffy (Lab)	Beverley Mullaney (Lab)
2022	Karen Regan (Lab)	Sue Duffy (Lab)	Beverley Mullaney (Lab)
2023	Karen Regan (Lab)	Sue Duffy (Lab)	Beverley Mullaney (Lab)
2024	Karen Regan (Lab)	Sue Duffy (Lab)	Beverley Mullaney (Lab)
2026	Lester Graham Martin (Reform UK)	Melanie Jane Milnes (Reform UK)	John Sharples (Reform UK)

indicates seat up for re-election.
