= 2008 City of Bradford Metropolitan District Council election =

2008 UK local government election

2008 local election results in Bradford

The 2008 City of Bradford Metropolitan District Council election took place on Thursday 1 May 2008.

== Ward results ==
An asterisk denotes an incumbent

=== Baildon ward ===
Baildon
Party	Candidate	Votes	%	±%
Liberal Democrats	John Cole*	3,122	55.32	
Conservative	David Herdson	2,230	39.51	
Labour	Vera Martin	292	5.17	
Majority		892	15.80	
Turnout		5,644	48.80	
Liberal Democrats hold		Swing		

=== Bingley ward ===
Cllr. Colin Gill resigned in September 2008 due to strain the position had placed on his professional life. John Pennington was elected in a by-election in December 2008, retaining the seat for the Conservative Party.

Bingley
Party	Candidate	Votes	%	±%
Conservative	Colin Gill*	3,529	62.97	
Labour	David Green	940	16.77	
Liberal Democrats	Jean Taylor	648	11.56	
Green	Arthur Arnold	487	8.69	
Majority		2,589	46.20	
Turnout		5,604	42.99	
Conservative hold		Swing		

=== Bingley Rural ward ===
Bingley Rural
Party	Candidate	Votes	%	±%
Conservative	Margaret Eaton*	3,839	71.20	
Labour	James Newton	690	12.80	
Liberal Democrats	Alan Sykes	496	9.20	
Green	Brian Newham	367	6.81	
Majority		3,149	58.40	
Turnout		5,392	40.49	
Conservative hold		Swing		

=== Bolton & Undercliffe ward ===
Bolton and Undercliffe
Party	Candidate	Votes	%	±%
Liberal Democrats	Margaret Chadwick	2,139	57.41	
Labour	Ronnie Fieldhouse	798	21.42	
Conservative	Isa Khan	557	14.95	
Green	Steven Schofield	232	6.23	
Majority		1,341	35.99	
Turnout		3,726	34.04	
Liberal Democrats hold		Swing		

=== Bowling & Barkerend ward ===
Incumbent Rupert Oliver switched from the Lib Dems to Labour in October 2006.

Bowling and Barkerend
Party	Candidate	Votes	%	±%
Conservative	John Robertshaw	1,796	42.93	
Labour	Rupert Oliver* (formerly Lib Dem)	1,376	32.89	
Liberal Democrats	Tracey Leeming	1,012	24.19	
Majority		420	10.04	
Turnout		4,184	35.76	
Conservative gain from Liberal Democrats		Swing		

=== Bradford Moor ward ===
Bradford Moor
Party	Candidate	Votes	%	±%
Liberal Democrats	Riaz Ahmed*	2,941	52.56	
Labour	Mohammed Shaukat	1,869	33.40	
Conservative	Sakhawat Hussain	786	14.05	
Majority		1,072	19.16	
Turnout		5,596	48.22	
Liberal Democrats hold		Swing		

=== City ward ===
City
Party	Candidate	Votes	%	±%
Labour	Sajawal Hussain*	2,497	63.83	
Conservative	Saleem Kader	815	20.83	
Liberal Democrats	Chris Reid	344	8.79	
Green	Chris Howson	256	6.54	
Majority		1,682	43.00	
Turnout		3,912	36.81	
Labour hold		Swing		

=== Clayton & Fairweather Green ward ===
Clayton & Fairweather Green
Party	Candidate	Votes	%	±%
Conservative	Elaine Byrom*	1,578	37.19	
Labour	Sinead Engel	1,324	31.20	
BNP	Neil Crossley	869	20.48	
Liberal Democrats	Lorna Leeming	387	9.12	
UKIP	James Illingworth	85	2.00	
Majority		254	5.99	
Turnout		4,243	39.98	
Conservative hold		Swing		

=== Craven ward ===
Craven
Party	Candidate	Votes	%	±%
Conservative	Adrian Naylor	3,162	67.22	
Labour	Robert Beckwith	866	18.41	
Liberal Democrats	Angela Pearson	676	14.37	
Majority		2,296	48.81	
Turnout		4,704	38.22	
Conservative hold		Swing		

=== Eccleshill ward ===
Eccleshill
Party	Candidate	Votes	%	±%
Liberal Democrats	Dorothy Ann Wallace*	1,551	36.45	
Conservative	John Pennington	1,301	30.58	
BNP	Leslie Nakonecznyi	763	17.93	
Labour	Tony Niland	602	14.15	
Democratic Nationalists	Trish Boyle	38	0.89	
Majority		250	5.88	
Turnout		4,255	37.40	
Liberal Democrats hold		Swing		

=== Great Horton ward ===
Cllr. Paul Flowers (Labour Party) stood down in 2011 after "adult content" was found on a council computer he had used. Abdul Jabar retained the seat for the party in a by-election later the same year.

Great Horton
Party	Candidate	Votes	%	±%
Labour	Paul John Flowers*	2,353	60.50	
Conservative	Qurban Hussain	1,014	26.07	
Liberal Democrats	Kasha de Verny	522	13.42	
Majority		1,339	34.43	
Turnout		3,889	35.58	
Labour hold		Swing		

=== Heaton ward ===
Heaton
Party	Candidate	Votes	%	±%
Conservative	Sajid Akhtar	1,823	37.26	
Green	David Ford	1,587	32.43	
Labour	Ashiq Hussain	1,018	20.81	
Liberal Democrats	Tariq Mahmood	465	9.50	
Majority		236	4.82	
Turnout		4,893	47.33	
Conservative hold		Swing		

=== Idle & Thackley ward ===
Idle and Thackley
Party	Candidate	Votes	%	±%
Liberal Democrats	Ed Hall	2,599	61.66	
Conservative	Ryan Atkinson	1,149	27.26	
Labour	Rosie Watson	467	11.08	
Majority		1,450	34.40	
Turnout		4,215	36.27	
Liberal Democrats hold		Swing		

=== Ilkley ward ===
Ilkley
Party	Candidate	Votes	%	±%
Conservative	Anne Gillian Hawkesworth*	3,245	64.35	
Labour	Andrew Dundas	719	14.26	
Liberal Democrats	Vaughan Bruce	553	10.97	
Green	Bryan Websdale	526	10.43	
Majority		2,526	50.09	
Turnout		5,043	45.36	
Conservative hold		Swing		

=== Keighley Central ward ===
Keighley Central
Party	Candidate	Votes	%	±%
Labour	Khadim Hussain*	2,559	52.86	
Conservative	Jamil Arshad	1,404	29.00	
Liberal Democrats	Roger Beaumont	878	18.14	
Majority		1,155	23.86	
Turnout		4,841	43.25	
Labour hold		Swing		

=== Keighley East ward ===
Keighley East
Party	Candidate	Votes	%	±%
Conservative	Dorothy Clamp	2,059	43.47	
Labour	Malcolm Slater*	1,995	42.12	
Liberal Democrats	Judith Brooksbank	683	14.42	
Majority		64	1.35	
Turnout		4,737	40.93	
Conservative gain from Labour		Swing		

=== Keighley West ward ===
Robert Payne was subsequently found guilty of tax fraud and jailed in December 2013.

Keighley West
Party	Candidate	Votes	%	±%
Conservative	Robert Payne	1,542	44.52	
Labour	Angela Sinfield	1,477	42.64	
Liberal Democrats	Frank McAulay	445	12.85	
Majority		65	1.88	
Turnout		3,464	32.12	
Conservative gain from BNP		Swing		

=== Little Horton ward ===
Little Horton
Party	Candidate	Votes	%	±%
Labour	Ian Greenwood*	2,063	60.45	
Liberal Democrats	Alun Griffiths	843	24.70	
Conservative	Jamshad Khan	507	14.85	
Majority		1,220	35.75	
Turnout		3,413	33.28	
Labour hold		Swing		

=== Manningham ward ===
Manningham
Party	Candidate	Votes	%	±%
Labour	Mohammad Amin	2,319	43.25	
Liberal Democrats	Mohammed Ishrat Mirza*	3,111	39.57	
Respect	Arshad Ali	395	7.37	
Conservative	Adam Jamal	246	4.59	
Green	John Robinson	214	3.99	
Anti-Crime Party	Norman Scarth	66	1.23	
Majority		197	3.67	
Turnout		5,362	49.14	
Labour gain from Liberal Democrats		Swing		

=== Queensbury ward ===
Queensbury
Party	Candidate	Votes	%	±%
Conservative	Michael Walls*	1,713	38.08	
BNP	Eric Baxendale	1,521	33.82	
Labour	Graham Mahony	713	15.85	
Liberal Democrats	David Weston	306	6.80	
UKIP	Jason Smith	227	5.05	
Democratic Nationalists	Laura Beardsworth	18	0.40	
Majority		192	4.27	
Turnout		4,498	39.70	
Conservative hold		Swing		

=== Royds ward ===
Royds
Party	Candidate	Votes	%	±%
Labour	Andrew Thornton*	1,414	39.10	
Conservative	Derek Green	922	25.50	
BNP	Linden Baxendale	693	19.16	
Liberal Democrats	Susan Fletcher	311	8.60	
Democratic Nationalists	Jim Lewthwaite	276	7.63	
Majority		492	13.61	
Turnout		3,616	31.74	
Labour hold		Swing		

=== Shipley ward ===
Shipley
Party	Candidate	Votes	%	±%
Green	Martin John Love*	2,238	47.78	
Conservative	Andy Rowley	1,264	26.99	
Labour	Emma Hoddinott	688	14.69	
Liberal Democrats	Christine Briggs	245	5.23	
UKIP	Philip Bird	153	3.27	
Democratic Nationalists	Paul Wood	96	2.05	
Majority		974	20.79	
Turnout		4,684	43.84	
Green hold		Swing		

=== Thornton & Allerton ward ===
Thornton and Allerton
Party	Candidate	Votes	%	±%
Conservative	Charles Sykes	1,750	41.96	
BNP	Jenny Sampson	1,056	25.29	
Labour	Mark Blackburn	834	20.00	
Liberal Democrats	Ruth Weston	475	11.39	
Democratic Nationalists	Ronald Craig	57	1.37	
Majority		695	16.66	
Turnout		4,171	37.79	
Conservative hold		Swing		

=== Toller ward ===
Councillor Arshad Hussain resigned from the Conservative group in February 2010 to become a Labour councillor.

Toller
Party	Candidate	Votes	%	±%
Conservative	Arshad Hussain*	1,986	35.67	
Labour	Sobia Kauser	1,978	35.53	
Liberal Democrats	Iqbal Khan	1,326	23.82	
Green	Sonja McNally	277	4.98	
Majority		8	0.14	
Turnout		5,567	48.00	
Conservative hold		Swing		

=== Tong ward ===
Tong
Party	Candidate	Votes	%	±%
Labour	Michael Johnson*	1,060	36.74	
Conservative	Simon Buckingham	852	29.53	
BNP	Rita Cromie	569	19.72	
Liberal Democrats	Kirsty Yeadon	327	11.33	
Democratic Nationalists	John Shoesmith	77	2.67	
Majority		208	7.21	
Turnout		2,885	24.85	
Labour hold		Swing		

=== Wharfedale ward ===
Wharfedale
Party	Candidate	Votes	%	±%
Conservative	Dale Smith*	2,718	66.03	
Liberal Democrats	Vernon Whelan	677	16.45	
Labour	Philip Ferriby	373	9.06	
Green	Richard Howson	348	8.45	
Majority		2,041	49.59	
Turnout		4,116	45.34	
Conservative hold		Swing		

=== Wibsey ward ===
Wibsey
Party	Candidate	Votes	%	±%
Labour	David Michael Adam Green*	1,397	38.46	
Conservative	Richard Sheard	921	25.36	
BNP	Clifford Cockayne	595	16.38	
Liberal Democrats	Brian Boulton	410	11.29	
English Democrat	Andrew Clarke	183	5.04	
UKIP	Stephen White	100	2.75	
Democratic Nationalists	Terry Wells	26	0.72	
Majority		476	13.11	
Turnout		3,632	35.46	
Labour hold		Swing		

=== Windhill & Wrose ward ===
Windhill and Wrose
Party	Candidate	Votes	%	±%
Liberal Democrats	John Hall	1,614	39.60	
Labour	Phil Thornton*	1,290	31.65	
Conservative	Chris Rowley	705	17.30	
Democratic Nationalists	Martin Craig	283	6.94	
Green	Linda Arnold	106	2.60	
Independent	Michael Breen	78	1.91	
Majority		324	7.95	
Turnout		4,076	37.50	
Liberal Democrats gain from Labour		Swing		

=== Worth Valley ward ===
Worth Valley
Party	Candidate	Votes	%	±%
Conservative	Kirstan Frederick Hopkins*	2,475	60.04	
Labour	Keith Dredge	1,027	24.92	
Liberal Democrats	Sam Harris	312	7.57	
Green	Betts Fetherston	308	7.47	
Majority		1,448	35.13	
Turnout		4,122	39.79	
Conservative hold		Swing		

=== Wyke ward ===
Wyke
Party	Candidate	Votes	%	±%
Labour	David Alexander Robinson*	1,187	32.04	
Conservative	Richard Milczanowski	1,099	29.66	
BNP	Stephen Cromie	629	16.98	
Liberal Democrats	Kevin Hall	458	12.36	
Democratic Nationalists	Neil Craig	332	8.96	
Majority		88	2.38	
Turnout		3,705	35.96	
Labour hold		Swing		

== By-elections between 2008 and 2010 elections ==
Vote changes correspond to the 2008 Council election.

=== Bingley ward ===
This was triggered by the resignation of Cllr. Colin Gill (Conservative Party).

Bingley by-election, 4 December 2008
Party	Candidate	Votes	%	±%
Conservative	John Pennington	1,949	59.88	−3.10
Labour	Andrew Mawson	689	21.17	+4.39
Liberal Democrats	Jean Taylor	332	10.20	−1.36
Green	Arthur Arnold	175	5.38	−3.31
Democratic Nationalists	James Lewthwaite	61	1.87	N/A
UKIP	Jason Smith	49	1.51	N/A
Majority		1,260	38.71	
Turnout		3,262	24.99	−18.00
Conservative hold		Swing		
