= 2016 City of Bradford Metropolitan District Council election =

2016 UK local government election

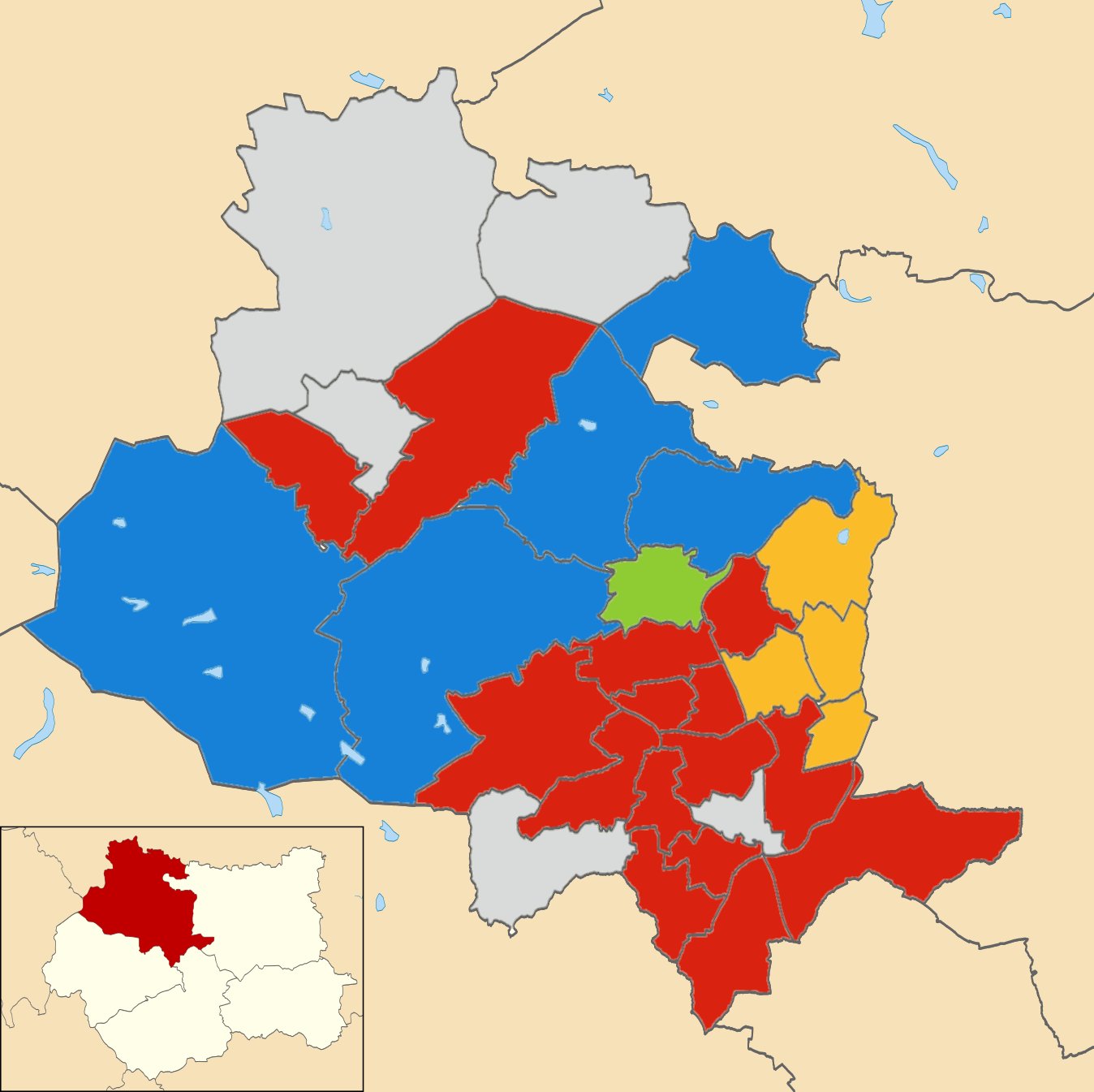
2016 local election results in Bradford

The 2016 City of Bradford Metropolitan District Council election took place on 5 May 2016. This was on the same day as other local elections. One councillor was elected in each ward of the City of Bradford Metropolitan District, for a four-year term. Each ward is represented by three councillors, the election of which is staggered, so only one third of the councillors were elected in this election.

== Election result ==
Of the Council's 90 seats, 30 were up for election.

Bradford Metropolitan District Council election, 2016
Party	Candidates						Votes		
Party	Stood	Elected	Gained	Unseated	Net	% of total	%	No.	Net %
Labour	30	15	▲	▼	Steady		40		Steady
Conservative	30	5	▲	▼	Steady		22		Steady
Liberal Democrats	30	4	▲	▼	Steady		12		Steady
Green	26	1	▲	▼	Steady		6		Steady
UKIP	20	0	▲	▼	Steady		11		Steady
Independent	9	2	▲	▼	Steady		5		Steady
TUSC	1	0	▲	▼	Steady			351	Steady
British Democrats	1	0	▲	▼	Steady			89	Steady

Party	Previous council	New council
Labour	46	49
Conservative	23	21
Liberal Democrats	9	10
Independent	8	6
Green	3	3
UKIP	1	1
Total	90	90
Working majority	2	8

== Ward results ==
An asterisk denotes an incumbent.

=== Baildon ward ===
Baildon
Party	Candidate	Votes	%	±%
Conservative	Debbie Davies	2,192	47.53	
Labour	Peter Joseph Ashton	988	21.42	
Liberal Democrats	John Malcolm Charles Cole	866	18.78	
UKIP	Dale Andrew Normington	382	8.28	
Green	Carl Andrew Dunk	184	3.99	
Majority		1,204	26.11	
Turnout		4,612	39	
Conservative hold		Swing		

=== Bingley ward ===
Bingley
Party	Candidate	Votes	%	±%
Conservative	John Allan Pennington*	2,720	45	
Labour	Joe Wheatley	1,673	28	
UKIP	Sara Hardman	876	14	
Green	Matthew Clive Edwards	528	9	
Liberal Democrats	Peter Shannon Russell	283	5	
Majority		1,047	17.2	
Turnout		6,080	44	
Conservative hold		Swing		

=== Bingley Rural ward ===
Bingley Rural
Party	Candidate	Votes	%	±%
Conservative	Naveed Riaz	1,990	38	
UKIP	Derrick John Hodgson	1,282	24	
Labour	Barney James Simkins O'Connor	1.208	23	
Liberal Democrats	Helen Baranowski	505	10	
Green	Brian Newham	305	6	
Majority		708	13.4	
Turnout		5,290	39	
Conservative hold		Swing		

=== Bolton and Undercliffe ward ===
Bolton and Undercliffe
Party	Candidate	Votes	%	±%
Liberal Democrats	David Ward	2,088	52.2	
Labour	Frank Dignan	1,214	30.4	
UKIP	Jonathan Daniel Stewart Barras	443	11.1	
Conservative	Geoff Whiteley	179	4.5	
Green	Alexander Charles Newsham	75	1.9	
Majority		874	21.9	
Turnout		3,999	37	
Liberal Democrats hold		Swing		

=== Bowling and Barkerend ward ===
Bowling and Barkerend
Party	Candidate	Votes	%	±%
Labour	Hassan Uzzaman Khan*	2,643	67	
Liberal Democrats	Bacha Sayed	650	17	
TUSC	Ian Slattery	351	9	
Conservative	Altaf Hussain	278	7	
Majority		1,993	50.8	
Turnout		3,922	34	
Labour hold		Swing		

=== Bradford Moor ward ===
The incumbent Faisal Khan was elected as a councillor for the Respect Party but resigned from the party in October 2013 and served as an independent councillor until March 2015 when he rejoined the party.

Bradford Moor
Party	Candidate	Votes	%	±%
Liberal Democrats	Riaz Ahmed	2,586	49.5	
Labour	Sabiya Khan	2,536	48.6	
Conservative	Naveed Ilyas	100	1.9	
Majority		50	1	
Turnout		5,222	46	
Liberal Democrats gain from Respect		Swing		

=== City ward ===
The incumbent Ruqayyah Collector was elected as a councillor for the Respect Party but resigned from the party in October 2013 and served as an independent councillor until March 2015 when he rejoined the party.

City
Party	Candidate	Votes	%	±%
Labour	Aneela Bano Ahmed	2,192	57	
Conservative	Munir Ahmed	1,356	35	
Green	David Cooper	251	6	
Liberal Democrats	Tariq Mahmood	80	2	
Majority		836	21.6	
Turnout		3,879	36	
Labour gain from Respect		Swing		

=== Clayton and Fairweather Green ward ===
Clayton & Fairweather Green
Party	Candidate	Votes	%	±%
Labour	Anjali Michelle Swallow*	1,990	54	
Conservative	Mohammed 'Harry' Boota	708	19	
UKIP	James David Vasey	702	19	
Liberal Democrats	Steven Michael Cotterill	160	4	
Green	Norma Russell	145	4	
Majority		1,282	34.6	
Turnout		3,705	34	
Labour hold		Swing		

=== Craven ward ===
Craven
Party	Candidate	Votes	%	±%
The Independents	Adrian Paul Naylor*	1,767	38	
Conservative	Peter William Clarke	1,324	28	
Labour	Val Carroll	1,225	26	
Green	Peter Alan Rawstron Ferguson	197	4	
Liberal Democrats	Gerald Stuart Ebden	185	4	
Majority		443	9.4	
Turnout		4,698	36	
Independent hold		Swing		

=== Eccleshill ward ===
Eccleshill
Party	Candidate	Votes	%	±%
Liberal Democrats	Brendan Robert Stubbs	1,678	44	
Labour	Munsaf Dad Saddiq	1,123	30	
UKIP	Lara Joy Barras	611	16	
Conservative	Terry Pearson	281	7	
Green	Helen Love	87	2	
Majority		555	14.7	
Turnout		3,780	33	
Liberal Democrats hold		Swing		

=== Great Horton ward ===
Great Horton
Party	Candidate	Votes	%	±%
Labour	Abdul Jabar*	2,894	72	
UKIP	Jamie Illingworth	445	11	
Conservative	Hashim Mohammad Kohan	304	8	
Liberal Democrats	Mary Slingsby	238	6	
Green	Michael John Stanlick	132	3	
Majority		2,449	61	
Turnout		4,013	39	
Labour hold		Swing		

=== Heaton ward ===
The incumbent Mohammad Shabbir was elected as a councillor for the Respect Party but resigned from the party in October 2013 and served until April 2015 as an independent councillor, he then joined the Labour Party.

Heaton
Party	Candidate	Votes	%	±%
Labour	Mohammad Shabbir*	2,236	48	
Conservative	Sajid Akhtar	1,566	34	
Green	Celia Ruth Hickson	727	16	
Liberal Democrats	Sayed Salman	92	2	
Majority		670	14.5	
Turnout		4,621	42	
Labour hold		Swing		

=== Idle and Thackley ward ===
Idle and Thackley
Party	Candidate	Votes	%	±%
Liberal Democrats	Alun Owen Griffiths*	2,567	60	
Labour	Rupert Oliver	654	15	
UKIP	Garry Blackmore	640	15	
Conservative	Falak Naz Ahmed	267	6	
Green	Sarah Elizabeth Dick	130	3	
Majority		1,913	44.9	
Turnout		4,258	35	
Liberal Democrats hold		Swing		

=== Ilkley ward ===
Ilkley
Party	Candidate	Votes	%	±%
Independent	Anne Gillian Hawkesworth*	2,260	42	
Conservative	Paul Marcus Barrett	1,386	26	
Labour	Henri Forbes Murison	1,147	21	
Green	Claire Darling	309	6	
UKIP	Paul John Latham	224	4	
Liberal Democrats	Kay Kirkham	103	2	
Majority		874	16.1	
Turnout		5,429	46	
Independent hold		Swing		

=== Keighley Central ward ===
Keighley Central
Party	Candidate	Votes	%	±%
Independent	Khadim Hussain*	2,571	46	
Labour	Kaneez Akthar	1,634	29	
Conservative	Abdul Nasser Razak	641	11	
UKIP	Mark Philip Hudson	437	8	
Liberal Democrats	Paul Michael Mann	187	3	
Green	Daisy May Knight	143	3	
Independent	Allah Ditta	34	1	
Majority		937	16.6	
Turnout		5,647	51	
Independent hold		Swing		

=== Keighley East ward ===
Keighley East
Party	Candidate	Votes	%	±%
Labour	Malcolm Slater*	2,671	57	
Conservative	Mark Francis Startin	994	21	
UKIP	Mark Eric Shaw	735	16	
Green	Jonni Thurling	154	3	
Liberal Democrats	Martin Beetham	123	3	
Majority		1,677	35.9	
Turnout		4,677	40	
Labour hold		Swing		

=== Keighley West ward ===
Keighley West
Party	Candidate	Votes	%	±%
Labour	Adrian Stuart Farley*	1,588	45	
Conservative	Christopher John Herd	1,034	29	
UKIP	Ian Ross Dermondy	754	21	
Green	Brian Richard Ford	77	2	
Liberal Democrats	Margaret Isobel Chadwick	71	2	
Majority		554	15.7	
Turnout		3,524	32	
Labour hold		Swing		

=== Little Horton ward ===
The incumbent Alyas Karmani was elected as a councillor for the Respect Party but resigned from the party in October 2013 and served as an independent councillor until March 2015 when he rejoined the party.

Little Horton
Party	Candidate	Votes	%	±%
Independent	Talat Sajawal	2,561	55	
Labour	Omar Hussain	1,814	39	
Liberal Democrats	Ian Vipond	130	3	
Conservative	Rizwan Sakhawat	110	2	
Green	Nurjahan Ali Arobi	81	2	
Majority		747	15.9	
Turnout		4,696	44	
Independent gain from Respect		Swing		

=== Manningham ward ===
The incumbent Ishtiaq Ahmed was elected as a councillor for the Respect Party but resigned from the party in October 2013 and served as an independent councillor until March 2015 when he rejoined the party.

Manningham
Party	Candidate	Votes	%	±%
Labour	Sarfraz Nazir	3,233	70	
Liberal Democrats	Mohammad Ishrat Mirza	1,019	22	
Green	John Edward Robinson	197	4	
Conservative	Ghazanfar Hussain	195	4	
Majority		2,214	47.7	
Turnout		4,644	44	
Labour gain from Respect		Swing		

=== Queensbury ward ===
Queensbury
Party	Candidate	Votes	%	±%
The Queensbury Ward Independents	Lynda Jane Cromie	1,507	38	
UKIP	Jason Paul Smith	972	25	
Labour	Andy Walsh	674	17	
Conservative	Michael Walls*	597	15	
Green	Eithne Mary Dodwell	128	3	
Liberal Democrats	James Hunt	53	1	
Majority		535	13.6	
Turnout		3,931	33	
The Queensbury Ward Independents gain from Conservative				

=== Royds ward ===
Royds
Party	Candidate	Votes	%	±%
Labour	Andrew Thornton*	1,398	44	
UKIP	Lois Wood	1,173	37	
Conservative	Ryan John Gerald Robertshaw	462	15	
Liberal Democrats	Shauna Ann Devonshire	136	4	
Majority		225	7.1	
Turnout		3,169	27	
Labour hold		Swing		

=== Shipley ward ===
Shipley
Party	Candidate	Votes	%	±%
Green	Martin John Love*	2,231	47	
Labour	Ben Pickles	1,579	33	
Conservative	David John Servant	800	17	
Liberal Democrats	Christine Betty Briggs	152	3	
Majority		652	13.7	
Turnout		4,762	43	
Green hold		Swing		

=== Thornton and Allerton ward ===
Thornton and Allerton
Party	Candidate	Votes	%	±%
Labour	Beverley Winifred Mullaney	1,795	43.4	
Conservative	Charles Malcolm Sykes*	1,501	36.3	
UKIP	Michael Evan McCabe	533	12.9	
Green	Helen Elizabeth Marriott	200	4.8	
Liberal Democrats	Susan Anne Elliott	111	2.7	
Majority		294	7.1	
Turnout		4,140	36	
Labour gain from Conservative		Swing		

=== Toller ward ===
Toller
Party	Candidate	Votes	%	±%
Labour	Arshad Hussain*	3,254	64	
Green	Sean Dobiech	189	3	
Conservative	Raja Altaf Hussain	1315	26	
Independent	Kasir Bashir Hussain	185	4	
Liberal Democrats	Amjad Ali	148	3	
Majority		1,939	38.1	
Turnout		5,091	45	
Labour hold		Swing		

=== Tong ward ===
Tong
Party	Candidate	Votes	%	±%
Labour	Michael Johnson*	1,143	46	
UKIP	Lincoln Stead	823	33	
Conservative	Eddie Ward	372	15	
Liberal Democrats	Kirsty Louise Yeadon	161	6	
Majority		320	12.8	
Turnout		2,499	22	
Labour hold		Swing		

=== Wharfedale ward ===
Wharfedale
Party	Candidate	Votes	%	±%
Conservative	Dale Smith*	2,145	54	
Labour	Caroline Rebecca Davison Firth	906	23	
Liberal Democrats	Bob Jones	491	12	
Green	Janet Souyave	395	10	
Majority		1,239	31.5	
Turnout		3,937	42	
Conservative hold		Swing		

=== Wibsey ward ===
Wibsey
Party	Candidate	Votes	%	±%
Labour	David Michael Adam Green*	1,651	47	
UKIP	Bernie Pringle	739	21	
Conservative	Richard Ian Sheard	547	16	
Independent	Khurram Shehzad	310	9	
Liberal Democrats	Brian James Boulton	156	4	
Green	Andrew Martin Robinson	121	3	
Majority		912	25.9	
Turnout		3,524	34	
Labour hold		Swing		

=== Windhill and Wrose ward ===
Windhill and Wrose
Party	Candidate	Votes	%	±%
Labour	Alex Ross-Shaw*	1,858	51	
UKIP	Hong Vi La	657	18	
Conservative	George Alexander Morrall	638	18	
Liberal Democrats	Gillian Thorne	289	8	
Green	Phillip Thornton	172	5	
Majority		1,201	33.2	
Turnout		3,614	33	
Labour hold		Swing		

=== Worth Valley ward ===
Worth Valley
Party	Candidate	Votes	%	±%
Conservative	Russell Brown*	1,589	41	
Labour	Mark Bernard Curtis	1,200	31	
UKIP	John Stevens Kirby	643	17	
Green	Kevin Leahi Campbell-Wright	296	8	
Liberal Democrats	Alan Sykes	129	3	
Majority		389	10.1	
Turnout		3,857	36	
Conservative hold		Swing		

=== Wyke ward ===
Wyke
Party	Candidate	Votes	%	±%
Labour	Rosie Watson	1,147	36	
UKIP	John James Worsley	701	22	
Independent	David Alexander Robinson	659	21	
Conservative	Francesca Louise Stefanyszyn	449	14	
British Democrats	James Graham Lewthwaite	89	3	
Liberal Democrats	Kevin Anthony Hall	88	3	
Green	Darren James Parkinson	71	2	
Majority		446	13.9	
Turnout		3,204	32	
Labour hold		Swing		

== By-elections between 2016 and 2018 elections ==
=== Queensbury ward ===
By-election triggered by the resignation of Cllr. Lisa Carmody (Conservative Party).

Queensbury by-election 4 May 2017
Party	Candidate	Votes	%	±%
Conservative	Andrew John Senior	2,175	56	
Independent	Jason Paul Smith	732	19	
Labour	Mobeen Hussain	697	18	
Green	Eithne Mary Dodwell	143	4	
Liberal Democrats	Mary Whitrick	135	3	
Majority		1,443	37.2	
Turnout		3,882	32	
Conservative hold		Swing		

=== Wibsey ward ===
By-election triggered by the death in office of Cllr. Lynne Smith (Labour).

Wibsey by-election 14 July 2016
Party	Candidate	Votes	%	±%
Labour	Joanne Lisa Sharp		51	
UKIP	Jason Paul Smith		27	
Conservative	Richard Ian Sheard		19	
Liberal Democrats	Angharad Elizabeth Griffiths		3	
Majority				
Turnout			23	
Labour hold		Swing		

== See also ==
- Bradford local elections
