= 2014 City of Bradford Metropolitan District Council election =

2014 UK local government election

The 2014 City of Bradford Metropolitan District Council election took place on 22 May 2014. This was on the same day as other local elections.

Results of the 2014 local elections in Bradford

== Results ==
Bradford City Council Election Result 2014
Party	Candidates						Votes		
Party	Stood	Elected	Gained	Unseated	Net	% of total	%	No.	Net %
Labour	31	16	▲1	▼1	Steady	51.6%	40.5%	55,210	▲5.6%
Conservative	31	8	Steady	▼2	▼2	25.8%	20.2%	27,518	▼12.4%
Liberal Democrats	31	3	Steady	Steady	Steady	9.7%	11.1%	15,106	▼10.7%
Independent	6	2	▲1	Steady	▲1	6.4%	4.8%	6,495	▲4.0%
UKIP	16	1	▲1	Steady	▲1	3.2%	12.6%	17,117	▲11.2%
Green	15	1	Steady	Steady	Steady	3.2%	5.0%	6,863	▲1.9%
Respect	9	Steady	Steady	Steady	Steady	0%	4.3%	5,818	▲0.1%
Peace	1	Steady	Steady	Steady	Steady	0%	0.7%	985	▲0.7%
British Democrats	2	Steady	Steady	Steady	Steady	0%	0.2%	267	▼4.2%

Party	Previous council	New council
Labour	45	46
Conservative	24	21
Liberal Democrat	8	8
Respect	5	0
Independent	5	11
Green	3	3
UKIP	0	1
Total	90	90
Working majority	0	2

== Ward Results ==
=== Baildon ward ===
Baildon
Party	Candidate	Votes	%	±%
Conservative	Valerie Margaret Townend	2,258	45.8%	▼1.3%
Liberal Democrats	Ian James Lyons	1,473	29.9%	▼7.3%
Labour	Joseph Thomas Ashton	842	17.1%	▲4.9%
Green	Alexander Charles Newsham	330	6.7%	▲3.5%
Majority		785	15.9%	▲5.9%
Turnout		4,929	41.6%	▼33.7%
Conservative hold		Swing	▲3%	

=== Bingley ward ===
Bingley
Party	Candidate	Votes	%	±%
Conservative	David Heseltine	2,183	39.9%	▼10.5%
Labour	Andrew David Mawson	1,307	23.9%	▼1.5%
UKIP	Lynne Hannam Edgley	1,295	23.7%	▲23.7%
Green	Darren James Parkinson	452	8.3%	2.0%
Liberal Democrats	Christine Betty Briggs	213	3.9%	▼13.6%
Majority		876	16.0%	▼8.9%
Turnout		5,467	38.3%	▼36.1%
Conservative hold		Swing	▼4.5%	

=== Bingley Rural ward ===
Bingley Rural
Party	Candidate	Votes	%	±%
Conservative	Michael George Ellis	2,047	40.0%	▼9.3%
UKIP	Stephen Henry	1,485	29.0%	▲22.4%
Labour	Andrew David McCormick	935	18.3%	▼3.0%
Green	Brian Newham	405	7.9%	▲4.1%
Liberal Democrats	Kay Kirkham	240	4.7%	▼13.8%
Majority		562	11.0%	▼17.0%
Turnout		5,122	37.1%	▼36.0%
Conservative hold		Swing	▼15.8%	

=== Bolton and Undercliffe ward ===
Bolton and Undercliffe
Party	Candidate	Votes	%	±%
Liberal Democrats	Rachel Emma Sunderland	1,969	50.3%	▲4.8%
Labour	Frank Dignan	1,462	37.4%	▲12.2%
Conservative	Christopher Michael Clapham	412	10.5%	▼7.8%
Majority		507	13.0%	▼7.4%
Turnout		3,911	35.1%	▼27.7%
Liberal Democrats hold		Swing	▲3.7%	

=== Bowling and Barkerend ward ===
Bowling and Barkerend
Party	Candidate	Votes	%	±%
Labour	Rizwana Jamil	2,532	55.8%	▲21.3%
Liberal Democrats	Michael Andrew Stelling	863	19.0%	▼6.5%
Respect	Mohammed Ashraf Miah	829	18.3%	▲15.4%
Conservative	Zaf Shah	249	5.5%	▼30.8%
Majority		1,669	36.8%	▲35.0%
Turnout		4,534	36.4%	▼22.6%
Labour gain from Conservative		Swing	▲13.9%	

=== Bradford Moor ward ===
Bradford Moor
Party	Candidate	Votes	%	±%
Labour	Mohammed Shafiq	2,671	46.7%	▲4.2%
Liberal Democrats	Riaz Ahmed	2,615	45.7%	▲12.7%
Respect	Arshad Ali	238	4.2%	▲4.2%
Conservative	Mohammed Tunveer	147	2.6%	▼20.8%
Majority		56	1.0%	▼8.6%
Turnout		5,723	48.8%	▼16.1
Labour hold		Swing	▼4.3%	

=== City ward ===
City
Party	Candidate	Votes	%	±%
Labour	Mohammed Nazam Azam	3,510	78.0%	▲15.5%
Respect	Syed Musuab Ali	656	14.6%	▲14.6%
Liberal Democrats	Stacey Yeadon	156	3.5%	▼4.6%
Conservative	Shahid Nabi	142	3.2%	▼17.5%
Majority		2,854	63.4%	▲21.6%
Turnout		4,502	36.9%	▼22.6%
Labour hold		Swing	▲0.5%	

=== Clayton and Fairweather Green ward ===
Clayton & Fairweather Green
Party	Candidate	Votes	%	±%
Labour	Sinead Engel	1,963	51.3%	▲11.8%
UKIP	James David Vasey	1,037	27.1%	▲27.1%
Conservative	Andrea Louise Taylor	674	17.6%	▼9.2%
Liberal Democrats	Nicola Pollard	145	3.8%	▼13.1%
Majority		926	24.2%	▲11.5%
Turnout		3,829	33.9%	▼31.8%
Labour hold		Swing	▼7.7%	

=== Craven ward ===
A second seat (won by Christopher Atkinson) was contested following the death in office of Councillor Michael Kelly.

Craven
Party	Candidate	Votes	%	±%
Conservative	Andrew Charles Mallinson	1,864		
Independent	Christopher Michael Atkinson	1,852		
Independent	Catherine Jane Coates	1478		
Conservative	Andrew Charles Rowley	1091		
Labour	Valerie Judith Carroll	1073		
Independent	David Michael Mullen	652		
Labour	Luke Edward Antony Joseph Maunsell	626		
Green	Margaret Kathryn Forrest	449		
Liberal Democrats	Samuel Edwin Harris	179		
Liberal Democrats	Michael Robert Thomas Powell	128		
Majority				
Turnout				
Conservative hold		Swing		
Independent gain from Conservative		Swing		

=== Eccleshill ward ===
Eccleshill
Party	Candidate	Votes	%	±%
Liberal Democrats	Geoff Reid	1,541	35.0%	▼3.9%
Labour	Stephen James Davison	1,324	30.1%	▲2.8%
Conservative	Terrance John Pearson	514	11.7%	▼5.4%
Green	Robert Minter Nicholls	391	8.9%	▲8.9%
Majority		217	4.9%	▼6.7%
Turnout		4,402	36.5%	▼23.9%
Liberal Democrats hold		Swing	▼3.4%	

=== Great Horton ward ===
Great Horton
Party	Candidate	Votes	%	±%
Labour	Joanne Margaret Dodds	2,696	63.2%	▲7.8%
UKIP	James Scott Beech	694	16.3%	▲16.3%
Conservative	Abdul Samed Zaman	548	13.2%	▼11.0%
Respect	Joe Hayat	196	4.6%	▲4.6%
Liberal Democrats	Mary Slingsby	115	2.7%	▼17.1%
Majority		2,002	46.9%	▲15.3%
Turnout		4,266	38.2%	▼20.3%
Labour hold		Swing	▼4.3%	

=== Heaton ward ===
Heaton
Party	Candidate	Votes	%	±%
Labour	Nussrat Mohammed	1,784	36.3%	▼0.6%
Peace	Imdad Hussain	985	20.1%	▲20.1%
Green	David Michael Ford	893	18.2%	▲1.7
Conservative	Sajid Mahmood	665	13.5%	▼16.7%
Respect	Peter William John Davis	408	8.3%	▲4.0%
Liberal Democrats	Mike McNally	131	2.7%	▼8.7%
Majority		799	16.3%	▼10.7%
Turnout		4,909	44.8%	▼25.1%
Labour hold		Swing	▼8.0%	

The incumbent was Imdad Hussain who had been elected for the Labour party but was suspended from the Labour Party for two years in 2012 when he failed to declare being banned as a company director. He subsequently joined the Peace Party becoming their only councillor and standing under that banner for re-election. Imdad was punched and his windscreen smashed in two separate incidents while canvassing for this election. He called for calm and said that tensions were really high.

=== Idle and Thackley ward ===
Idle and Thackley
Party	Candidate	Votes	%	±%
Liberal Democrats	Dominic Fear	2,334	57.5%	▲5.6%
Labour	Angela Tait	889	21.9%	▲3.5%
Conservative	Peter Andrew Robert Mills	838	20.6%	▼4.2%
Majority		1,445	35.6%	▲8.6%
Turnout		4,061	33.0%	▼45.6%
Liberal Democrats hold		Swing	▼1.1%	

=== Ilkley ward ===
Ilkley
Party	Candidate	Votes	%	±%
Conservative	Michael Peter Gibbons	2,705	51.7%	▲1.4%
Labour	Alexander James MacPherson	1,303	24.9%	▲4.6%
Green	Brian Richard Ford	508	9.7%	▲2.9%
Liberal Democrats	Peter Alan Ferguson	359	6.9%	▼11.5%
UKIP	Paul John Latham	348	6.7%	▲2.9%
Majority		1,402	26.8%	▼4.1%
Turnout		5,231	44.5%	▼26.8%
Conservative hold		Swing	▼1.6%	

=== Keighley Central ward ===
Keighley Central
Party	Candidate	Votes	%	±%
Labour	Abid Hussain	3,418	63.5%	▲9.3%
Conservative	Akbar Ali	745	13.8%	▼9.4%
UKIP	George Michael Firth	722	13.4%	▲13.4%
Green	Rohman Ali	236	4.4%	▲0.4%
Liberal Democrats	Pauline Rogan	222	4.1%	▼13.2%
Majority		2,673	49.7%	▲18.7%
Turnout		5,381	46.0%	▼25.0%
Labour hold		Swing	▲9.4%	

=== Keighley East ward ===
Keighley East
Party	Candidate	Votes	%	±%
Labour	Stephen Pullen	1,881	39.0%	▼2.4%
UKIP	Ian Bannister	1,192	24.7%	▲24.7%
Conservative	Allan Joseph Doherty	968	20.1%	▼18.3%
Respect	Shazad Murtaza	492	10.2%	▲10.2%
Liberal Democrats	Judith Brooksbank	263	5.5%	▼14.0%
Majority		689	14.3%	▲11.2%
Turnout		4,825	40.1%	▼24.7%
Labour hold		Swing	▼13.5%	

=== Keighley West ward ===
In October 2016 Brian Morris quit UKIP and became an independent councillor.

Keighley West
Party	Candidate	Votes	%	±%
UKIP	Brian Morris	1,418	39.8%	▲39.8%
Labour	Keith Edward Dredge*	1,252	35.1%	▼4.1%
Conservative	Ryan Thomas Andrew Brown	613	17.2%	▼19.6%
Green	Barbara Elizabeth Archer	208	5.8%	▲5.8%
Liberal Democrats	Jack Taylor	63		
Majority		166	4.7%	▲2.2%
Turnout		3,566	31.1%	▼28.7%
UKIP gain from Labour		Swing	▲21.9%	

=== Little Horton ward ===
Little Horton
Party	Candidate	Votes	%	±%
Labour	Naveeda Ikram*	3,297	74.9%	▲15.6%
Respect	Shamsher Malik Yasin	722	16.4%	▲16.4%
Liberal Democrats	Shabir Ahmed Butt	181	4.1%	▼14.8%
Conservative	Altaf Hussain	137	3.1%	▼17.9%
Majority		2,575	58.5%	▲20.2%
Turnout		4,402	38.2%	25.9%
Labour hold		Swing	▼0.4%	

=== Manningham ward ===
Manningham
Party	Candidate	Votes	%	±%
Labour	Shabir Hussain*	3,218	61.3%	▲2.2%
Respect	Naweed Hussain	1,617	30.8%	▲30.8%
Green	John Edward Robinson	170	3.2%	▼1.3%
Conservative	Hassan Nadim	120	2.3%	▼5.6%
Liberal Democrats	Margaret Isobel Chadwick	92	1.8%	▼25.9%
Majority		1,601	30.5%	▼1.0%
Turnout		5,246	46.1%	▼20.3%
Labour hold		Swing	▼14.3%	

=== Queensbury ward ===
Paul Cromie was elected to represent the British National Party in 2010 but then left the party in 2011 standing as The Queensbury Ward Independents with his wife Jane Cromie who won another of the Queensbury councillor seats in 2011.

Queensbury
Party	Candidate	Votes	%	±%
The Queensbury Ward Independents	Paul Gregory Smith Cromie*	1,377	35.7%	▲5.0%
UKIP	Jason Paul Smith	1,262	32.7%	▲27.4%
Labour	Rosemary Watson	628	16.3%	▼4.7%
Conservative	John Antony Robertshaw	489	12.7%	▼17.8%
Liberal Democrats	Ruth Mary Sharples Weston	89	2.3%	▼9.9%
Majority		115	3.0%	▲2.8%
Turnout		3,855	32.1%	▼25.8%
Independent hold		Swing	▼11.2%	

=== Royds ward ===
Royds
Party	Candidate	Votes	%	±%
Labour	Valerie Slater*	1,389	40.5%	▼1.0%
UKIP	John James Worsley	1,232	35.9%	▲35.9%
Conservative	David John Servant	464	13.5%	▼8.9%
Liberal Democrats	Shauna Ann Devonshire	177	5.2%	▼11.6%
British Democrats	James Graham Lewthwaite	152	4.4%	▼11.3%
Majority		157	4.6%	▼14.4%
Turnout		3,431	28.6%	▼14.4%
Labour hold		Swing	▼18.4%	

=== Shipley ward ===
Shipley
Party	Candidate	Votes	%	±%
Green	Hawarun Nessa Hussain*	2,037	43.7%	▲13.6%
Labour	Aidan Paul Enright	1,048	22.5%	▼1.3%
Conservative	Thomas William Banks	805	17.3%	▼9.2%
UKIP	Philip Edward Bird	647	13.9%	▲8.6%
Liberal Democrats	Liam James Preston	118	2.5%	▼11.6%
Majority		989	21.2%	▲17.6%
Turnout		4,665	41.2%	▼23.6%
Green hold		Swing	▲7.5%	

=== Thornton and Allerton ward ===
Thornton and Allerton
Party	Candidate	Votes	%	±%
Labour	Richard Lee Dunbar	1,737	45.5%	▲15.2%
Conservative	Clive Thomas Richardson	1,685	44.1%	▲4.9%
Liberal Democrats	Susan Anne Elliott	298	7.8%	▼7.0%
Majority		52	1.4%	▼7.5%
Turnout		3,818	33.1%	▼40.6%
Labour gain from Conservative		Swing	▲5.1%	

=== Toller ward ===
Toller
Party	Candidate	Votes	%	±%
Labour	Imran Hussain*	4,850	80.3%	▲23.7%
Respect	Bilal Ali	660	10.9%	▲7.5%
Green	James Alistair Kirkcaldy	209	3.5%	▲1.1%
Conservative	Hashim Mohammad Al-Kohan	205	3.4%	▼27.4%
Liberal Democrats	David Leeming	93	1.5%	▼4.3%
Majority		4,190	69.3%	▲43.6%
Turnout		6,043	50.8%	▼2.4%
Labour hold		Swing	▲8.1%	

=== Tong ward ===
Tong
Party	Candidate	Votes	%	±%
Labour	Alan Frederick Wainwright*	1,156	42.4%	▼0.3%
UKIP	Bernard Francis Pringle	945	34.7%	▲34.7%
Conservative	Edward Christopher Ward	339	12.4%	▼12.4%
Liberal Democrats	Kirsty Louise Yeadon	159	5.8%	▼12.1%
British Democrats	Liam Andrew Kernaghan	115	4.2%	▼9.9%
Majority		211	7.7%	▼10.2%
Turnout		2,725	23.4%	▼57.5%
Labour hold		Swing	▼17.5%	

The percentage change for the British Democratic Party (2013) candidate is compared to the British National Party candidate in the 2010 election.

=== Wharfedale ward ===
Wharfedale
Party	Candidate	Votes	%	±%
Conservative	Gerald Anthony Granville Barker	1,737	42.2%	▼10.8%
Independent	Stephen David Ellams	1,017	24.7%	▲24.7%
Labour	Niccola Swan	737	17.9%	▲2.1%
Green	Janet Souyave	393	9.5%	▲3.2%
Liberal Democrats	Paul James Treadwell	220	5.3%	▼19.1%
Majority		720	17.5%	▼11.1%
Turnout		4,119	44.0%	▼18.5%
Conservative hold		Swing	▼6.5%	

Chris Graves was the incumbent, who stood down at this election.

=== Wibsey ward ===
Wibsey
Party	Candidate	Votes	%	±%
Labour	Lynne Eleanor Smith*	1,467	41.7%	▲1.5%
UKIP	James Andrew Illingworth	1,355	38.5%	▲33.7%
Conservative	Richard Ian Sheard	499	14.2%	▼9.1%
Liberal Democrats	Brian James Boulton	191	5.4%	▼13.5%
Majority		112	3.2%	▼13.7%
Turnout		3,520	33.3%	▼31.2%
Labour hold		Swing	▼16.1%	

=== Windhill and Wrose ward ===
Windhill and Wrose
Party	Candidate	Votes	%	±%
Labour	Vanda Greenwood*	1,799	47.1%	▲7.7%
UKIP	Hong Vi La	1,089	28.5%	▲28.5%
Conservative	Claire-Marie Elizabeth Parr	467	12.2%	▼5.0%
Liberal Democrats	Gillian Thorne	282	7.4%	▼24.3%
Green	Helen Love	169	4.4%	▲4.4%
Majority		710	18.6%	▲10.8%
Turnout		3,817	34.6%	▼39.3%
Labour hold		Swing	▼10.4%	

=== Worth Valley ward ===
Worth Valley
Party	Candidate	Votes	%	±%
Conservative	Glen William Miller*	1,384	34.2%	▼10.9%
UKIP	Peter Allan Gilchrist Corkindale	1,169	28.9%	▲28.9%
Labour	Mark Bernard Curtis	1,067	26.4%	▼3.9%
Green	Celia Ruth Hickson	310	7.7%	▲7.7%
Liberal Democrats	Alan Sykes	104	2.6%	▼15.4%
Majority		215	5.3%	▼9.5%
Turnout		4,043	37.8%	▼26.2%
Conservative hold		Swing	▼19.9%	

=== Wyke ward ===
Wyke
Party	Candidate	Votes	%	±%
Labour	David Warburton*	1,349	40.6%	▲2.7%
UKIP	Lois Wood	1,227	37.0%	▲37.0%
Conservative	Richard Milczanowski	524	15.8%	▼11.5%
Independent	Neil Craig	119	3.6%	▲3.6%
Liberal Democrats	Kevin Anthony Hall	93	2.8%	▼14.4%
Majority		122	3.7%	▼7.0%
Turnout		3,319	32.0%	▼32.0%
Labour hold		Swing	▼17.2%	
