= Bingley Rural =

Electoral ward in West Yorkshire, England

Coordinates: 53.81°N 1.84°W

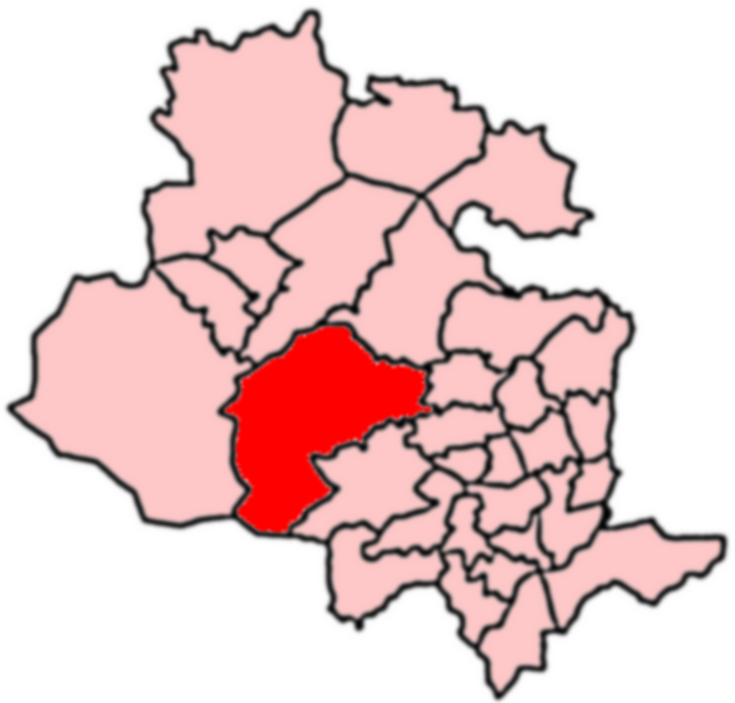
- 2004 Boundaries of Bingley Rural Ward

- Location within West Yorkshire
- Population: 17,895 (Ward. 2011)
- OS grid reference: SE106394
- Metropolitan borough: City of Bradford
- Metropolitan county: West Yorkshire
- Region: Yorkshire and the Humber
- Country: England
- Sovereign state: United Kingdom
- Post town: BRADFORD
- Postcode district: BD16
- Dialling code: 01274
- Police: West Yorkshire
- Fire: West Yorkshire
- Ambulance: Yorkshire
- UK Parliament: Shipley
- Councillors: Michael Ellis (Conservative Party); Simon Cooke (Conservative Party); Naveed Riaz (Conservative Party)

Bingley Rural is an electoral ward in the City of Bradford Metropolitan District Council. The population of the ward at the 2011 Census was 17,895.

It encompasses the villages of Harden, Wilsden, Cottingley, Cullingworth and Denholme.

== Councillors ==
The ward is represented on Bradford Council by three Conservative councillors, Michael Ellis, Simon Cooke and Naveed Riaz.

Election	Councillor	Councillor	Councillor
2004	Juliette Kinsey (Con)	Andrew Simon Cooke (Con)	Margaret Eaton (Con)
2006	Michael Ellis (Con)	Simon Cooke (Con)	Margaret Eaton (Con)
2007	Michael Ellis (Con)	Simon Cooke (Con)	Margaret Eaton (Con)
2008	Michael Ellis (Con)	Simon Cooke (Con)	Margaret Eaton (Con)
2010	Michael Ellis (Con)	Simon Cooke (Con)	Margaret Eaton (Con)
2011	Michael Ellis (Con)	Simon Cooke (Con)	Margaret Eaton (Con)
2012	Michael Ellis (Con)	Simon Cooke (Con)	Margaret Eaton (Con)
2014	Michael Ellis (Con)	Simon Cooke (Con)	Margaret Eaton (Con)
2015	Michael Ellis (Con)	Simon Cooke (Con)	Margaret Eaton (Con)
2016	Michael Ellis (Con)	Simon Cooke (Con)	Naveed Riaz (Con)

indicates seat up for re-election.
