= 2010 City of Bradford Metropolitan District Council election =

2010 UK local government election

2010 local election results in Bradford

The 2010 City of Bradford Metropolitan District Council elections took place on Thursday 6 May 2010. The 2010 general election was held simultaneously, which is understood to have greatly increased the turnout.

== Ward results ==
An asterisk denotes an incumbent

=== Baildon ward ===
Baildon
Party	Candidate	Votes	%	±%
Conservative	Valerie Townend*	4,012	47.29	−1.04
Liberal Democrats	Denise Thomas	3,162	37.27	−2.22
Labour	Mairead Farndale	1,040	12.26	+7.84
Green	Robert Nicholls	270	3.18	−4.58
Majority		850	10.02	
Turnout		8,514	75.35	+29.18
Conservative hold		Swing		

=== Bingley ward ===
Bingley
Party	Candidate	Votes	%	±%
Conservative	David Heseltine*	4,922	50.60	−3.46
Labour	Andrew Mawson	2,483	25.52	+4.70
Liberal Democrats	David Lerner	1,714	17.62	+5.20
Green	Arthur Arnold	609	6.26	−6.44
Majority		2,439	25.07	
Turnout		9,769	74.37	+30.78
Conservative hold		Swing		

=== Bingley Rural ward ===
Bingley Rural
Party	Candidate	Votes	%	±%
Conservative	Michael Ellis*	4,671	49.52	−1.49
Labour	Robert Beckwith	2,017	21.38	+4.53
Liberal Democrats	Alan Sykes	1,752	18.57	+5.77
UKIP	Paul Wright	629	6.67	N/A
Green	Brian Newham	364	3.86	N/A
Majority		2,654	28.14	
Turnout		9,479	73.06	+30.83
Conservative hold		Swing		

=== Bolton & Undercliffe ward ===
Bolton and Undercliffe
Party	Candidate	Votes	%	±%
Liberal Democrats	David Gray*	3,047	45.77	−10.96
Labour	Mark Fieldhouse	1,686	25.33	±0.00
Conservative	Abdul Butt	1,226	18.42	+0.47
BNP	Sharif Gawad	492	7.39	N/A
Green	Steven Schofield	149	2.24	N/A
Democratic Nationalists	Glenis Fairclough	57	0.86	N/A
Majority		1,361	20.44	
Turnout		6,690	62.85	+28.36
Liberal Democrats hold		Swing		

=== Bowling & Barkerend ward ===
Bowling and Barkerend
Party	Candidate	Votes	%	±%
Conservative	Zameer Shah*	2,357	36.58	−1.55
Labour	Rupert Oliver	2,241	34.78	+7.35
Liberal Democrats	Tracey Leeming	1,658	25.73	+4.69
Independent	Chris Johnson	188	2.92	N/A
Majority		116	1.80	
Turnout		6,486	58.99	+18.11
Conservative hold		Swing		

=== Bradford Moor ward ===
Bradford Moor
Party	Candidate	Votes	%	±%
Labour	Mohammed Shafiq*	3,114	43.02	+0.65
Liberal Democrats	Shabir Butt	2,416	33.38	+5.32
Conservative	Mohammed Bashir	1,708	23.60	−5.97
Majority		698	9.64	
Turnout		7,324	64.90	+20.04
Labour hold		Swing		

=== City ward ===
City
Party	Candidate	Votes	%	±%
Labour	Nazam Azam	3,792	63.07	−5.73
Conservative	Waheed Ali	1,259	20.94	+10.96
Liberal Democrats	Ali Jamal	491	8.17	−3.81
Respect	Shabana Bashir	211	3.51	N/A
Green	Derek Curtis	195	3.24	−6.00
UKIP	Hiren Koyani	64	1.06	N/A
Majority		2,533	42.13	
Turnout		6,071	59.48	+27.31
Labour hold		Swing		

=== Clayton & Fairweather Green ward ===
Clayton & Fairweather Green
Party	Candidate	Votes	%	±%
Labour	Sinead Engel	2,672	39.69	+11.08
Conservative	David Servant*	1,815	26.96	−2.85
Liberal Democrats	Philip Boyle	1,140	16.93	+1.31
BNP	Neil Crossley	707	10.50	−15.47
Independent	Mark Nicholson	399	5.93	N/A
Majority		857	12.73	
Turnout		6,767	65.66	+26.39
Labour gain from Conservative		Swing		

=== Craven ward ===
Craven
Party	Candidate	Votes	%	±%
Conservative	Andrew Mallinson*	4,903	54.30	−5.78
Labour	Peter Cheney	2,295	25.42	+2.62
Liberal Democrats	Barbara Pierscionek	1,831	20.28	+3.16
Majority		2,608	28.88	
Turnout		9,080	74.73	+38.72
Conservative hold		Swing		

=== Eccleshill ward ===
In 2006, Colin McPhee stood in this ward successfully as a Liberal Democrat candidate.

Eccleshill
Party	Candidate	Votes	%	±%
Liberal Democrats	Geoff Reid	2,454	39.02	+8.86
Labour	Tony Niland	1,720	27.35	+4.32
Conservative	Colin McPhee*	1,078	17.14	−1.08
BNP	Nicholas Asquith	773	12.29	−16.29
UKIP	Michael Feely	264	4.20	N/A
Majority		734	11.67	
Turnout		6,305	60.40	+25.08
Liberal Democrats hold		Swing		

=== Great Horton ward ===
Great Horton
Party	Candidate	Votes	%	±%
Labour	Joanne Dodds*	3,647	56.00	+5.29
Conservative	Qurban Hussain	1,567	24.06	−7.93
Liberal Democrats	Antony Habergham	1,299	19.94	−0.16
Majority		2,080	31.94	
Turnout		6,578	58.47	23.44
Labour hold		Swing		

=== Heaton ward ===
Imdad Hussain joined the Peace Party in 2012, following suspension from the Labour Party over failing to declare a company directorship. He became the party's first and only Councillor.

Heaton
Party	Candidate	Votes	%	±%
Labour	Imdad Hussain	2,600	37.20	+11.76
Conservative	Mohammad Masood*	2,127	30.43	−2.41
Green	Sonja McNally	1,162	16.62	−6.57
Liberal Democrats	Liam Prentice	799	11.43	−7.09
Respect	Mohammad Abu-Bakr	302	4.32	N/A
Majority		473	6.77	
Turnout		7,033	68.05	23.16
Labour gain from Conservative		Swing		

=== Idle & Thackley ward ===
Idle and Thackley
Party	Candidate	Votes	%	±%
Liberal Democrats	Chris Reid	4,179	52.09	−7.09
Conservative	Edward Ward	2,003	24.97	−0.54
Labour	Rosie Watson	1,483	18.49	+2.03
UKIP	Jeetender Sangha	357	4.45	N/A
Majority		2,176	27.13	
Turnout		8,059	69.91	+31.24
Liberal Democrats hold		Swing		

=== Ilkley ward ===
Ilkley
Party	Candidate	Votes	%	±%
Conservative	Mike Gibbons	4,378	50.56	−7.57
Labour	Andrew Dundas	1,766	20.39	−2.60
Liberal Democrats	Vaughan Bruce	1,595	18.42	−0.45
Green	David Hesmondhalgh	596	6.88	N/A
UKIP	Paul Latham	324	3.74	N/A
Majority		2,612	30.17	
Turnout		8,697	78.59	+36.03
Conservative hold		Swing		

=== Keighley Central ward ===
Keighley Central
Party	Candidate	Votes	%	±%
Labour	Abid Hussain	4,174	54.86	+9.54
Conservative	Ali Akbar	1,791	23.54	−3.27
Liberal Democrats	Roger Beaumont	1,334	17.53	−10.33
Green	Julian Hughes	309	4.06	N/A
Majority		2,383	31.32	
Turnout		7,700	71.31	+22.17
Labour hold		Swing		

=== Keighley East ward ===
Keighley East
Party	Candidate	Votes	%	±%
Labour	Steve Pullen*	3,265	41.72	+2.37
Conservative	Ronald Beale	3,024	38.64	+11.17
Liberal Democrats	Judith Brooksbank	1,537	19.64	+8.28
Majority		241	3.08	
Turnout		7,891	70.99	+28.44
Labour hold		Swing		

=== Keighley West ward ===
Keighley West
Party	Candidate	Votes	%	±%
Labour	Keith Dredge	2,625	39.34	−1.03
Conservative	Chris Herd	2,463	36.91	+18.75
Liberal Democrats	Jack Taylor	911	13.65	+5.17
Independent	Brian Hudson	674	10.10	N/A
Majority		162	2.43	
Turnout		6,703	64.80	+23.72
Labour hold		Swing		

=== Little Horton ward ===
Little Horton
Party	Candidate	Votes	%	±%
Labour	Naveeda Ikram*	3,638	59.75	−8.65
Conservative	Suhail Choudhury	1,287	21.14	+4.15
Liberal Democrats	Alun Griffiths	1,164	19.12	+4.50
Majority		2,351	38.61	
Turnout		6,139	59.87	+25.07
Labour hold		Swing		

=== Manningham ward ===
Manningham
Party	Candidate	Votes	%	±%
Labour	Shabir Hussain*	3,961	59.62	+12.81
Liberal Democrats	Mohammed Aurangzeb	1,851	27.86	−17.84
Conservative	Mohammed Khan	530	7.98	+0.49
Green	John Robinson	302	4.55	N/A
Majority		2,110	31.76	
Turnout		6,698	64.06	+18.55
Labour hold		Swing		

=== Queensbury ward ===
In June 2011 Paul Cromie and his wife Lynda (also a councillor) left the British National Party citing 'personal reasons'. They now stand as The Queensbury Ward Independents.

Queensbury
Party	Candidate	Votes	%	±%
BNP	Paul Cromie*	2,212	30.79	−7.70
Conservative	Allan Shepherd	2,197	30.58	−1.68
Labour	Dave Allen	1,511	21.03	+1.35
Liberal Democrats	Stacey Yeadon	882	12.28	+2.70
UKIP	Jason Smith	383	5.33	N/A
Majority		15	0.21	
Turnout		7,204	66.40	+23.88
BNP hold		Swing		

=== Royds ward ===
Royds
Party	Candidate	Votes	%	±%
Labour	Val Slater*	2,601	41.60	+4.82
Conservative	Sally McCartney	1,408	22.52	+2.77
Liberal Democrats	John Bolton	1,051	16.81	+6.33
BNP	Eric Baxendale	986	15.77	−17.23
Democratic Nationalists	James Lewthwaite	207	3.31	N/A
Majority		1,193	+19.08	
Turnout		6,272	57.98	+23.95
Labour hold		Swing		

=== Shipley ward ===
Shipley
Party	Candidate	Votes	%	±%
Green	Hawarun Hussain*	2,321	30.16	−6.50
Conservative	Andrew Rowley	2,041	26.52	+1.12
Labour	Alex Ross	1,836	23.86	+9.02
Liberal Democrats	Russell Halliday	1,090	14.16	+5.66
UKIP	Philip Bird	408	5.30	N/A
Majority		280	3.64	
Turnout		7,719	72.97	+25.37
Green hold		Swing		

=== Thornton & Allerton ward ===
Thornton and Allerton
Party	Candidate	Votes	%	±%
Conservative	Valerie Binney*	2,736	39.34	+5.30
Labour	Mark Blackburn	2,115	30.41	+9.63
Liberal Democrats	Ruth Weston	1,030	14.81	5.97
BNP	Jenny Sampson	776	11.16	−18.71
UKIP	John Worsley	297	4.27	N/A
Majority		621	8.93	
Turnout		6,972	64.83	+24.98
Conservative hold		Swing		

=== Toller ward ===
Imran Hussain was later selected (in 2012) to contest the Bradford West constituency, which resulted in a shock victory for George Galloway of the Respect Party.

Toller
Party	Candidate	Votes	%	±%
Labour	Imran Hussain*	4,337	57.19	+14.54
Conservative	Amjad Hussain	2,361	31.13	−0.24
Liberal Democrats	Ansar Miah	444	5.85	−20.14
Respect	Kauser Rauf	259	3.42	N/A
Green	Vanessa Pilny	183	2.41	N/A
Majority		1,976	26.05	
Turnout		7,664	73.73	22.76
Labour hold		Swing		

=== Tong ward ===
Tong
Party	Candidate	Votes	%	±%
Labour	Alan Wainwright	2,418	42.92	+2.53
Conservative	Craig Reynolds	1,403	24.90	+8.85
Liberal Democrats	Kirsty Yeadon	1,012	17.96	+6.39
BNP	Rita Cromie	801	14.22	−17.77
Majority		1,015	18.02	
Turnout		5,656	48.44	+20.45
Labour hold		Swing		

=== Wharfedale ward ===
In February 2012 Chris Greaves was sacked by the Conservative Party for frequently voting with Labour at council meetings. A month later he formed The Independents with fellow ex-Conservative Adrian Naylor (Craven ward).

Wharfedale
Party	Candidate	Votes	%	±%
Conservative	Chris Greaves*	3,874	53.21	−8.49
Liberal Democrats	Vernon Whelan	1,789	24.57	−0.10
Labour	James Newton	1,156	15.88	+2.25
Green	Richard Howson	462	6.35	N/A
Majority		2,085	28.64	
Turnout		7,307	80.92	+34.78
Conservative hold		Swing		

=== Wibsey ward ===
Wibsey
Party	Candidate	Votes	%	±%
Labour	Lynne Smith*	2,454	40.30	+5.65
Conservative	Richard Sheard	1,422	23.35	+0.82
Liberal Democrats	Brian Boulton	1,158	19.01	6.56
BNP	David Bond	765	12.56	−17.81
UKIP	Jamie Illingworth	291	4.78	N/A
Majority		1,032	16.95	
Turnout		6,111	62.52	+23.20
Labour hold		Swing		

=== Windhill & Wrose ward ===
Windhill and Wrose
Party	Candidate	Votes	%	±%
Labour	Vanda Greenwood*	2,710	39.58	+11.40
Liberal Democrats	Gillian Thorne	2,174	31.75	4.70
Conservative	Richard Sibley	1,182	17.26	+0.14
BNP	John Mills	781	11.41	−12.30
Majority		536	7.83	
Turnout		6,868	64.53	24.53
Labour hold		Swing		

=== Worth Valley ward ===
Worth Valley
Party	Candidate	Votes	%	±%
Conservative	Glen Miller*	3,387	45.44	+7.51
Labour	Mark Curtis	2,274	30.51	+4.55
Liberal Democrats	Sam Harris	1,350	18.11	+6.60
Independent	Brian Morris	443	5.94	N/A
Majority		1,113	14.93	
Turnout		7,502	73.94	+28.72
Conservative hold		Swing		

=== Wyke ward ===
Wyke
Party	Candidate	Votes	%	±%
Labour	David Warburton*	2,369	38.12	+6.12
Conservative	Richard Milczanowski	1,705	27.44	+1.42
Liberal Democrats	Kevin Hall	1,073	17.27	+3.99
BNP	Stephen Cromie	792	12.75	−15.96
Democratic Nationalists	Neil Craig	275	4.43	N/A
Majority		664	10.69	
Turnout		6,237	64.05	−20.48
Labour hold		Swing		

== By-elections between 2010 and 2011 elections ==
Vote changes correspond to 2010 Council election.

=== Worth Valley ward ===
This was triggered by the resignation of Cllr. Kris Hopkins (Conservative Party), who resigned having won the Keighley parliamentary seat in the 2010 general election.

Worth Valley by-election, 25 November 2010
Party	Candidate	Votes	%	±%
Conservative	Russell Brown	1,020	47.84	+2.40
Labour	Mark Curtis	697	32.69	+2.19
Green	Robert Swindells	235	11.02	N/A
Liberal Democrats	Sharon Purvis	180	8.44	−9.67
Majority		323	15.15	
Turnout		2,139	19.46	−58.48
Conservative hold		Swing		
