= Bowling and Barkerend =

Coordinates: 53.783°N 1.733°W

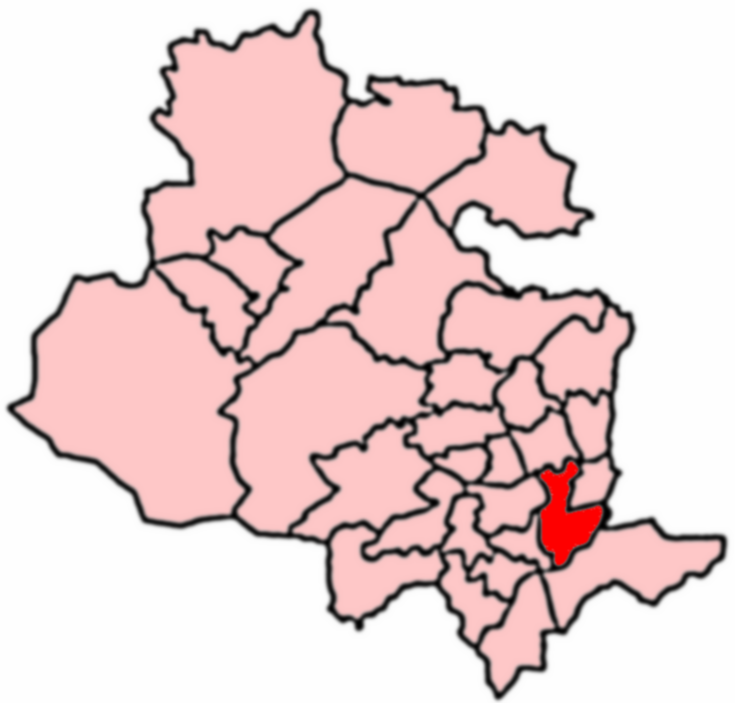
- 2004 Boundaries of Bowling and Barkerend Ward

- Location within West Yorkshire
- Population: 20,618 Ward. 2011
- OS grid reference: SE178318
- Metropolitan borough: City of Bradford
- Metropolitan county: West Yorkshire
- Region: Yorkshire and the Humber
- Country: England
- Sovereign state: United Kingdom
- Post town: BRADFORD
- Postcode district: BD4 BD3
- Dialling code: 01274
- Police: West Yorkshire
- Fire: West Yorkshire
- Ambulance: Yorkshire
- UK Parliament: Bradford East
- Councillors: Rizwana Jamil (Labour); Imran Khan (Labour); Hassan Khan (Labour)

Bowling and Barkerend is an electoral ward within the City of Bradford Metropolitan District Council. The population at the 2011 Census was 20,618.

Bowling and Barkerend covers the area immediately east and south of Bradford centre. It includes the areas known as Barkerend, Bowling, East Bowling, Swaine Green, Cutler Heights and Goose Hill. St Clement's Church on Barkerend Road has Pre-Raphaelite decorations by Sir Edward Burne-Jones. Note that West Bowling is in neighbouring Little Horton ward.

Bradford UK ward map 2010 (Bowling & Barkerend)

== Boundaries ==
It is bounded on the west side by the Bradford Inner Ring Road (Canal Road, Shipley Airedale Road, Croft Street) then the railway line from Bradford Interchange to Halifax until it meets New Cross Street where the boundary heads south east around the edge of Parkside (New Cross Street, Avenue Road, Parkside Road and along the edge of the Cemetery). On the south side the boundary follows the Outer Ring Road (Rooley Lane, Sticker Lane) past Wakefield Road then forks east on Cutler Heights Lane which becomes Dick Lane as it curves northward. The boundary then follows the Bradford to Leeds railway line west. The boundary heads north again along Birksland Street and continues the same line between Gledhill Road and Whitehead Street, through the grounds of Leeds Road Hospital and along the edge of the allotments to Barkerend Road. Then north east along the path marking the edge of Bradford Moor Golf Course to re-join the Outer Ring Road (Killinghall Road). Along the north side the boundary forks west off Killinghall Road onto Northcote Road then turns west along Otley Road. The boundary loops south round Undercliffe Cemetery and back to Otley Road, as the road turns south the boundary continues west along the edge of the school fields to Bolton Road and continues west down the hill to Canal Road as it feeds into the inner ring road.

== Councillors ==
Bowling and Barkerend ward is represented on Bradford Council by three Labour Party councillors, Rizwana Jamil, Imran Khan and Hassan Khan.

Election	Councillor	Councillor	Councillor
2004	Mukhtar Ali (Lib Dem)	Mohammed Jamil (Con)	Rupert Oliver (Lib Dem)
2006	Zameer Hussain Shah (Con)	Mohammed Jamil (Con)	Rupert Oliver (Lib Dem)
October 2006	Zameer Shah (Con)	Mohammed Jamil (Con)	Rupert Oliver (Lab)
2007	Zameer Shah (Con)	Mohammed Jamil (Con)	Rupert Oliver (Lab)
2008	Zameer Shah (Con)	Mohammed Jamil (Con)	John Robertshaw (Con)
2010	Zameer Shah (Con)	Mohammed Jamil (Con)	John Robertshaw (Con)
2011	Zameer Shah (Con)	Imran Ahmed Khan (Lab)	John Robertshaw (Con)
2012	Zameer Shah (Con)	Imran Khan (Lab)	Hassan Uzzaman Khan (Lab)
2014	Rizwana Jamil (Lab)	Imran Khan (Lab)	Hassan Khan (Lab)
2015	Rizwana Jamil (Lab)	Imran Khan (Lab)	Hassan Khan (Lab)
2016	Rizwana Jamil (Lab)	Imran Khan (Lab)	Hassan Khan (Lab)

indicates seat up for re-election. Incumbent Rupert Oliver switched from the Lib Dems to Labour in October 2006.

== Elections in 2010s ==
=== May 2016 ===
2016 United Kingdom local elections: Bowling and Barkerend
Party	Candidate	Votes	%	±%
Labour	Hassan Uzzaman Khan*	2,643	67	
Liberal Democrats	Bacha Sayed	650	17	
TUSC	Ian Slattery	351	9	
Conservative	Altaf Hussain	278	7	
Majority		1,993	50.8	
Turnout		3,922	34	
Labour hold		Swing		

=== May 2015 ===
In the 2015 election one of the three councillor posts was up for re-election. Imran Ahmed Khan for the Labour Party was the incumbent. The election was held in conjunction with the 2015 UK general election. Turnout is often increased in local elections when held in conjunction with general elections.

2015 United Kingdom local elections: Bowling and Barkerend
Party	Candidate	Votes	%	±%
Labour	Imran Ahmed Khan	3,446	50.5	▼6.1
Conservative	Mohammed Jamil	1,380	20.2	▲14.62
Liberal Democrats	Susan Anne Elliott	942	13.8	▼5.5
UKIP	Brian Gilbert Jones	792	11.6	▲11.6
Green	Dale Patrick Deacon	201	2.9	▲2.9
TUSC	Ian Slattery	63	0.9	▲0.9
Majority		2,066	30.3	▼7.42
Turnout		6,824	61.6	▲18.6
Labour hold		Swing	▼7.42	

=== May 2014 ===
In the 2014 election one of the three councillor posts was up for re-election. Zafir Hussain Shah for the Conservative Party was the incumbent. The percentage changes are calculated in comparison to the 2012 election.

2014 United Kingdom local elections: Bowling and Barkerend
Party	Candidate	Votes	%	±%
Labour	Rizwana Jamil	2,532	56.6	▲14.2
Liberal Democrats	Michael Andrew Stelling	863	19.3	▲6.9
Respect	Mohammed Ashraf Miah	829	18.5	▼15.6
Conservative	Zaf Shah	249	5.6	▼5.4
Majority		1,669	37.3	▲29.0
Turnout		5,403	43.0	▲5.5
Labour gain from Conservative		Swing	▲29.0	

=== May 2012 ===
In the 2012 election one of the three councillor posts was up for re-election. John Anthony Robertshaw for the Conservative Party was the incumbent. The percentage changes are calculated in comparison to the party performances in the 2011 election.

2012 United Kingdom local elections: Bowling and Barkerend
Party	Candidate	Votes	%	±%
Labour	Hassan Uzzaman Khan	1,913	42.4	▼0.8
Respect	Mohammed Asif Kahn	1,535	34.1	▲34.1
Liberal Democrats	Amjad Ali	561	12.4	▼12.4
Conservative	John Anthony Robertshaw	498	11	▼19.9
Majority		378	8.3	▼4.0
Turnout		4,546	37.5	▼2.5
Labour gain from Conservative		Swing	▼4.0	

=== May 2011 ===
In the 2011 election one of the three councillor posts was up for re-election. Mohammed Jamil for the Conservative Party was the incumbent. The percentage changes are calculated compared to the party performances in the 2010 election.

2011 United Kingdom local elections: Bowling and Barkerend
Party	Candidate	Votes	%	±%
Labour	Imran Ahmed Khan	2,003	43.2	▲8.4
Conservative	Mohammed Jamil	1,433	30.9	▼5.7
Liberal Democrats	Tracey Dawn Leeming	1,152	24.8	▼0.9
Majority		570	12.3	▲14.1
Turnout		4,636	40.0	▼19.0
Labour gain from Conservative		Swing	▲14.1	

=== May 2010 ===
In the 2010 election one of the three councillor posts was up for re-election. Zameer Shah for the Conservative Party was the incumbent. The percentage changes are calculated compared to the party shares in the 2008 election. The election was held in conjunction with the 2010 General Election, turnout is often increased when local elections coincide with General Elections.

2010 United Kingdom local elections: Bowling and Barkerend
Party	Candidate	Votes	%	±%
Conservative	Zameer Hussain Shah	2,357	36.6	▼6.3
Labour	Rupert Oliver	2,241	34.8	▲1.9
Liberal Democrats	Tracey Dawn Leeming	1,658	25.7	▲1.5
Majority		116	1.8	▼8.8
Turnout		6,486	59	▲23
Conservative hold		Swing	▼8.8	

=== Elections in 2000s ===
2008

In the 2008 election one of the three councillor posts was up for re-election. Rupert Oliver for the Labour Party was the incumbent though he had been elected for the Liberal Democrats. The percentage changes are calculated compared to the party shares in the 2007 election.

2008 United Kingdom local elections: Bowling and Barkerend
Party	Candidate	Votes	%	±%
Conservative	John Antony Robertshaw	1,796	42.9	▼3.1
Labour	Rupert Oliver	1,376	32.9	▲3.1
Liberal Democrats	Tracey Dawn Leeming	1,012	24.2	▲2.4
Majority		420	10	▼6.2
Turnout		4,202	36	▼3.1
Conservative hold		Swing	▼6.2	

2007

In the 2007 Election one of the three councillor posts was up for re-election. Mohammed Jamil for the Conservative Party was the incumbent. The percentage changes are calculated in comparison the party shares in the 2006 election.

2007 United Kingdom local elections: Bowling and Barkerend
Party	Candidate	Votes	%	±%
Conservative	Mohammed Jamil	2,094	45.99	▲7.9
Labour	Raymond Bage	1,355	29.76	▲2.3
Liberal Democrats	Tracey Dawn Leeming	986	21.76	▲0.6
Independent	Muhammad Shakeel	87	1.91	N/A
Majority		739	16.23	▲5.5
Turnout		4,553	39.12	▼1.3
Conservative hold		Swing	5.5	

In July 2006 Rupert Oliver, elected for the Liberal Democrats, resigned the Liberal Democrat whip & joined the Labour Party.

2006

In the 2006 Election only one of the three councillor posts was up for re-election. Mukhtar Ali for the Liberal Democrats was the incumbent. The turnout does not include spoiled papers & is a percentage of the 2007 electorate. Percentages changed are expressed compared to the overall party showings in 2004.

2006 United Kingdom local elections: Bowling and Barkerend
Party	Candidate	Votes	%	±%
Conservative	Zameer Shah	1,792	38.13	▼3.6
Labour	Raymond Bage	1,289	27.43	▲4.0
Liberal Democrats	Mukhtar Ali	989	21.04	▼20.6
BNP	Sharif Gawad	630	13.40	▲13.4
Majority		503	10.70	17.5
Turnout		4,700	40.4	▼1.0
Conservative gain from Liberal Democrats		Swing	17.5	

2004

The ward was created after boundary changes in the 2004 election. All three councillor posts were up for election and each elector had three votes. The turnout is estimated as a third of the total votes cast as a fraction of the 2007 electorate. Candidate percentages are expressed as a fraction of this turnout estimate. The election was held in conjunction with the 2004 European election.

2004 United Kingdom local elections: Bowling and Barkerend
Party	Candidate	Votes	%	±%
Liberal Democrats	Rupert Oliver	2,448	50.8	N/A
Conservative	Mohammed Jamil	1,827	37.9	N/A
Liberal Democrats	Mukhtar Ali	1,810	37.5	N/A
Liberal Democrats	Ghulam Chaudhury	1,770	36.7	N/A
Conservative	Zameer Shah	1,679	34.8	N/A
Conservative	Dawood Karim	1,545	32.0	N/A
Labour	Raymond Bage	1,212	25.1	N/A
Labour	Anthony Niland	1,196	24.8	N/A
Labour	Shofiqul Islam	977	20.3	N/A
Turnout		4,821	41.4	N/A
Liberal Democrats win (new seat)				
Conservative win (new seat)				
Liberal Democrats win (new seat)				
