= City of Bradford Metropolitan District Council elections =

Local government elections in West Yorkshire, England

City of Bradford Metropolitan District Council elections are held three years out of every four to elect members to City of Bradford Metropolitan District Council in West Yorkshire, England. Since the last boundary changes in 2004 the council has comprised 90 councillors representing 30 wards, with each ward electing three councillors.

== Summary results since 2012 ==
Year	Labour	Conservative	Liberal Democrats	Green	UKIP	Respect	Reform UK	Queensbury Independents	Independent	Council control after election
2012	45	24	8	3	0	5	0	2	3	No overall control
2014	46	21	8	3	1	0	0	2	9	Labour
2015	46	23	9	3	1	2	0	0	6	Labour
2016	49	21	10	3	0	0	0	2	6	Labour
2018	52	22	8	2	0	0	0	1	5	Labour
2019	53	22	7	2	0	0	0	1	5	Labour
2021	51	25	7	3	0	0	0	0	4	Labour
2022	52	21	6	6	0	0	0	0	5	Labour
2023	56	16	5	8	0	0	0	0	5	Labour
2024	49	13	5	10	0	0	0	0	13	Labour
2026	17	18	1	9	0	0	29	0	13	No overall control

== Council elections ==
- 1973 City of Bradford Metropolitan District Council election
- 1975 City of Bradford Metropolitan District Council election
- 1976 City of Bradford Metropolitan District Council election
- 1978 City of Bradford Metropolitan District Council election
- 1979 City of Bradford Metropolitan District Council election
- 1980 City of Bradford Metropolitan District Council election
- 1982 City of Bradford Metropolitan District Council election
- 1983 City of Bradford Metropolitan District Council election
- 1984 City of Bradford Metropolitan District Council election
- 1986 City of Bradford Metropolitan District Council election
- 1987 City of Bradford Metropolitan District Council election
- 1988 City of Bradford Metropolitan District Council election
- 1990 City of Bradford Metropolitan District Council election
- 1991 City of Bradford Metropolitan District Council election
- 1992 City of Bradford Metropolitan District Council election
- 1994 City of Bradford Metropolitan District Council election
- 1995 City of Bradford Metropolitan District Council election
- 1996 City of Bradford Metropolitan District Council election
- 1998 City of Bradford Metropolitan District Council election
- 1999 City of Bradford Metropolitan District Council election
- 2000 City of Bradford Metropolitan District Council election
- 2002 City of Bradford Metropolitan District Council election
- 2003 City of Bradford Metropolitan District Council election
- 2004 City of Bradford Metropolitan District Council election (New ward boundaries)
- 2006 City of Bradford Metropolitan District Council election
- 2007 City of Bradford Metropolitan District Council election
- 2008 City of Bradford Metropolitan District Council election
- 2010 City of Bradford Metropolitan District Council election
- 2011 City of Bradford Metropolitan District Council election
- 2012 City of Bradford Metropolitan District Council election
- 2014 City of Bradford Metropolitan District Council election
- 2015 City of Bradford Metropolitan District Council election
- 2016 City of Bradford Metropolitan District Council election
- 2018 City of Bradford Metropolitan District Council election
- 2019 City of Bradford Metropolitan District Council election
- 2021 City of Bradford Metropolitan District Council election
- 2022 City of Bradford Metropolitan District Council election
- 2023 City of Bradford Metropolitan District Council election
- 2024 City of Bradford Metropolitan District Council election
- 2026 City of Bradford Metropolitan District Council election (New ward boundaries)

== District result maps ==
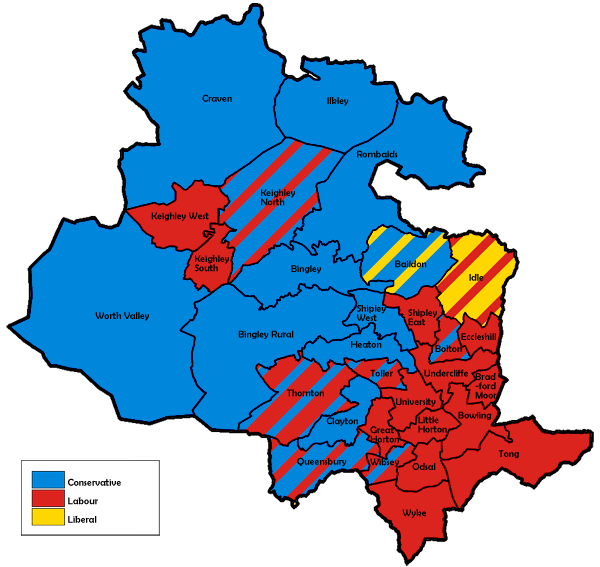
1980 results map

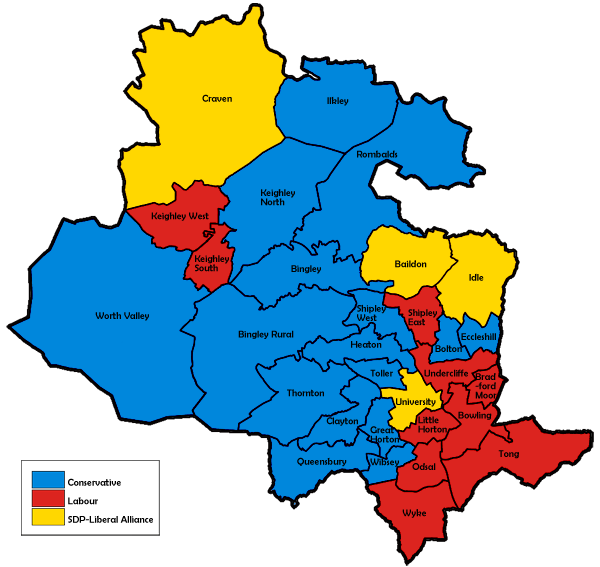
1982 results map

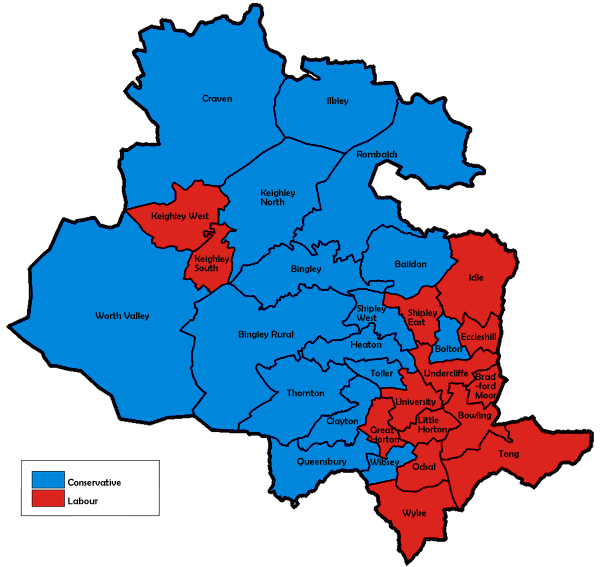
1983 results map

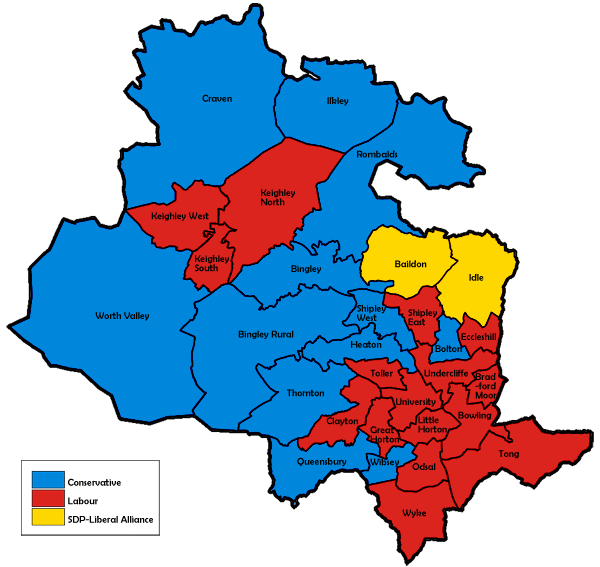
1984 results map

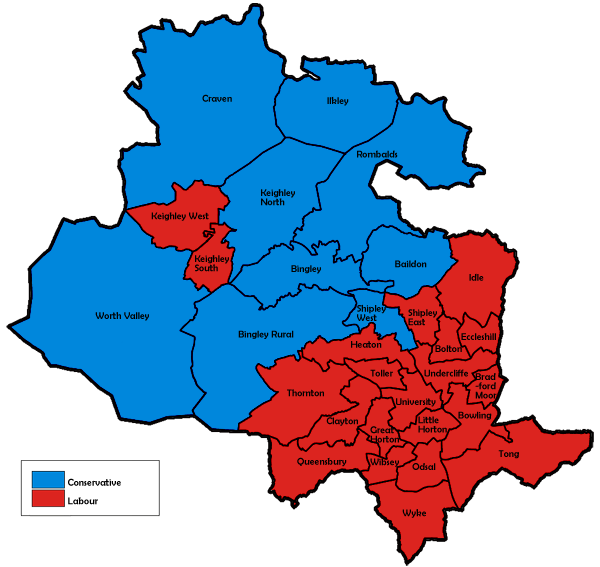
1986 results map

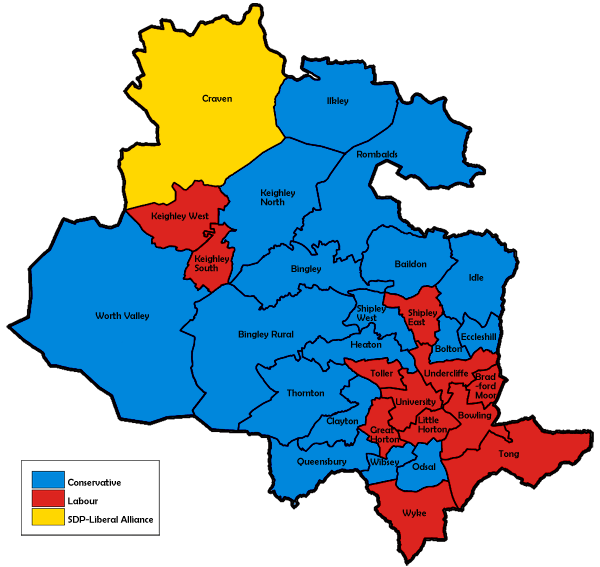
1987 results map

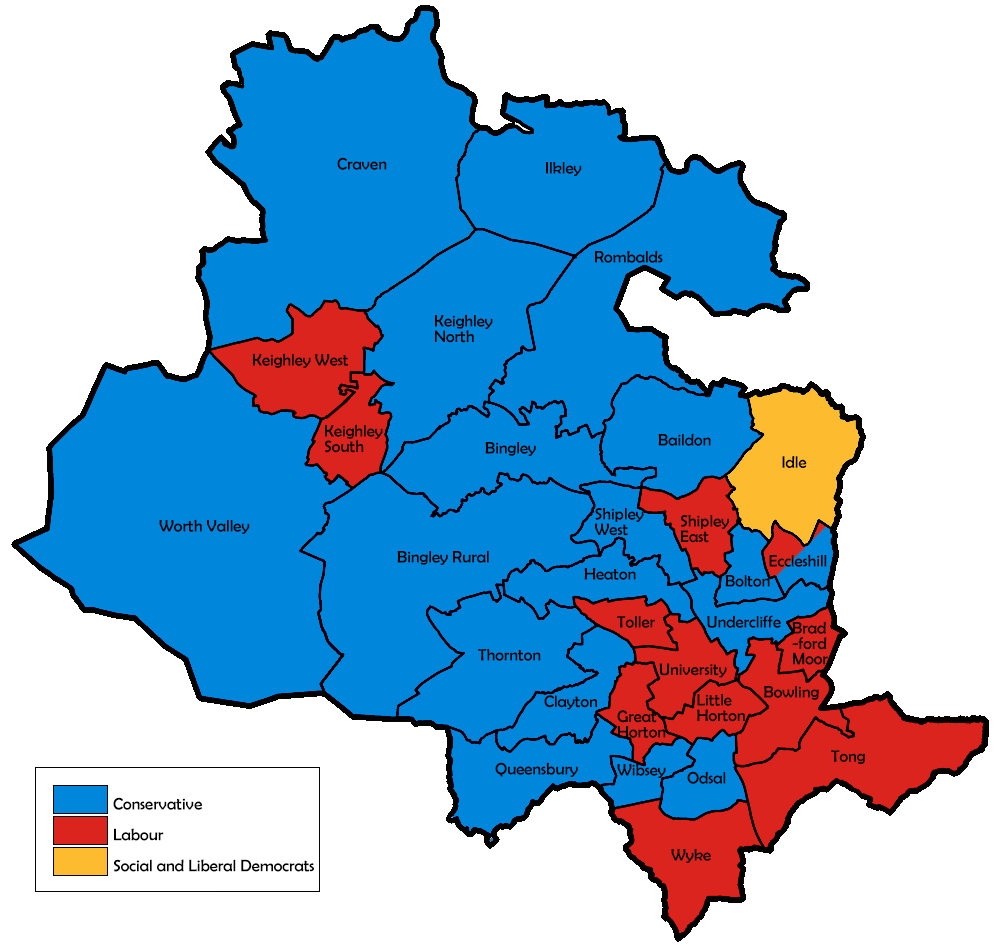
1988 results map

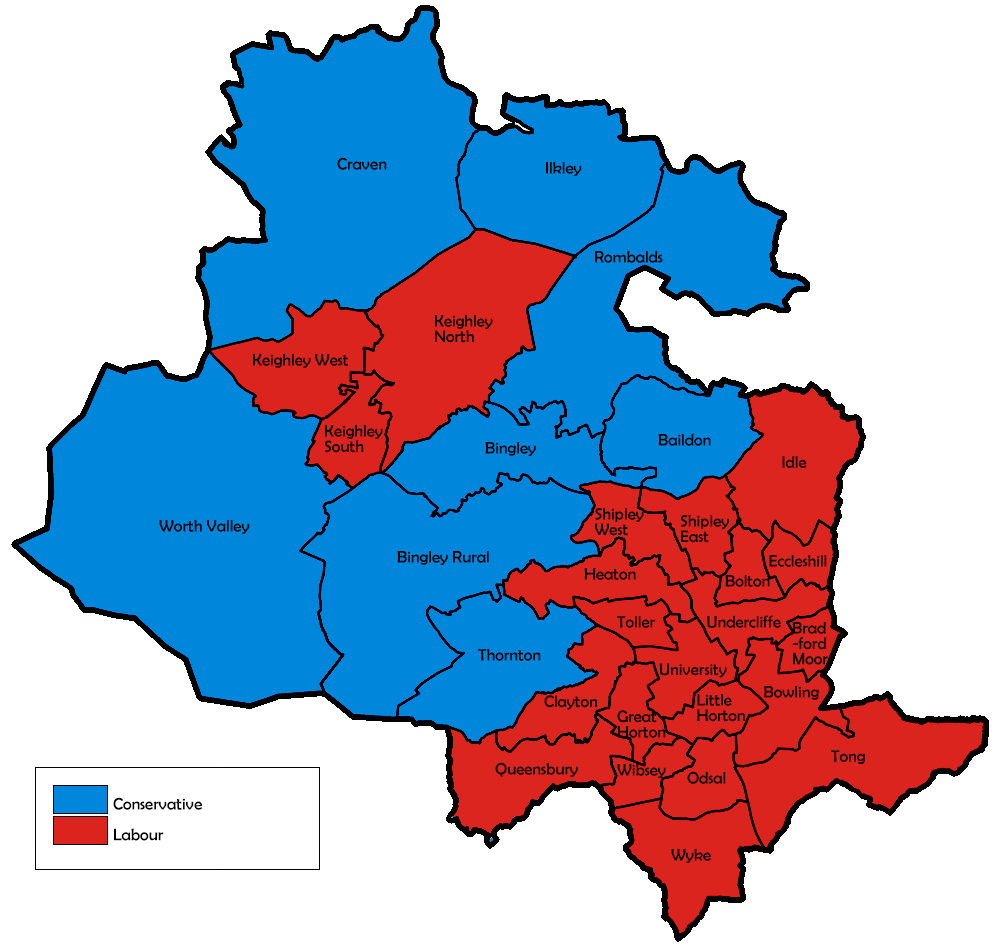
1990 results map

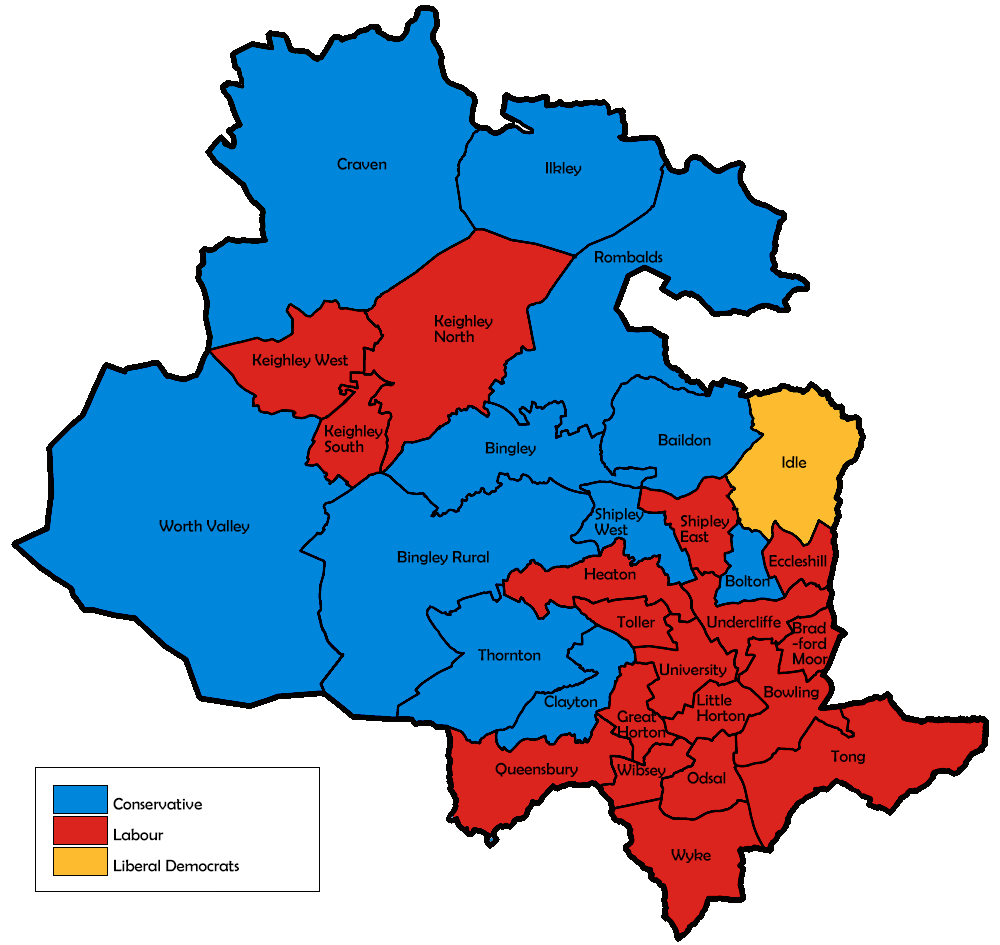
1991 results map

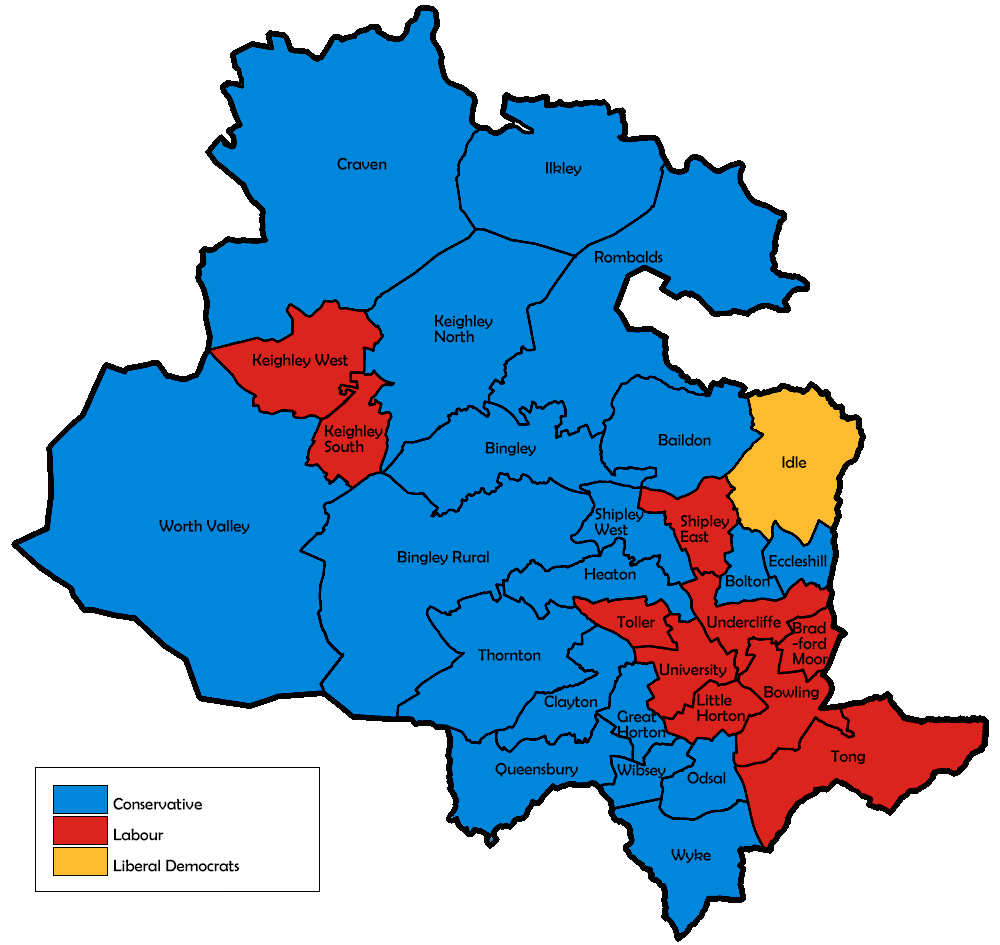
1992 results map

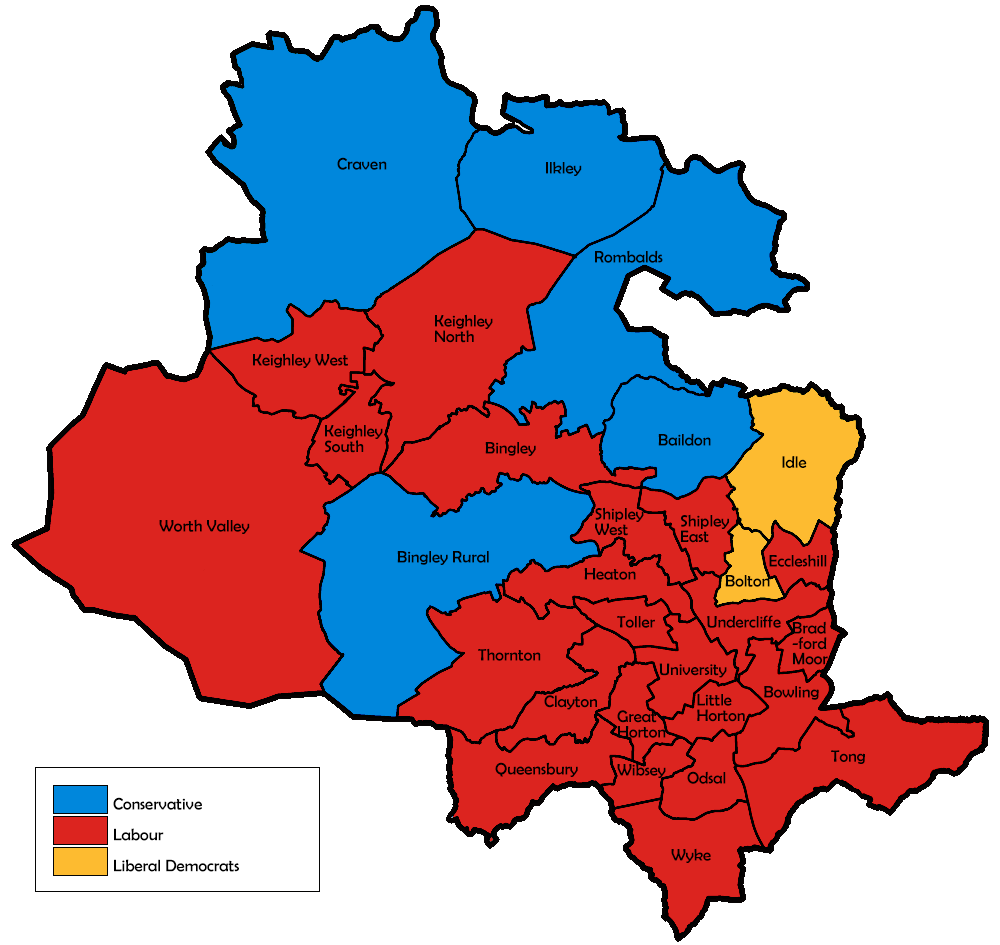
1994 results map

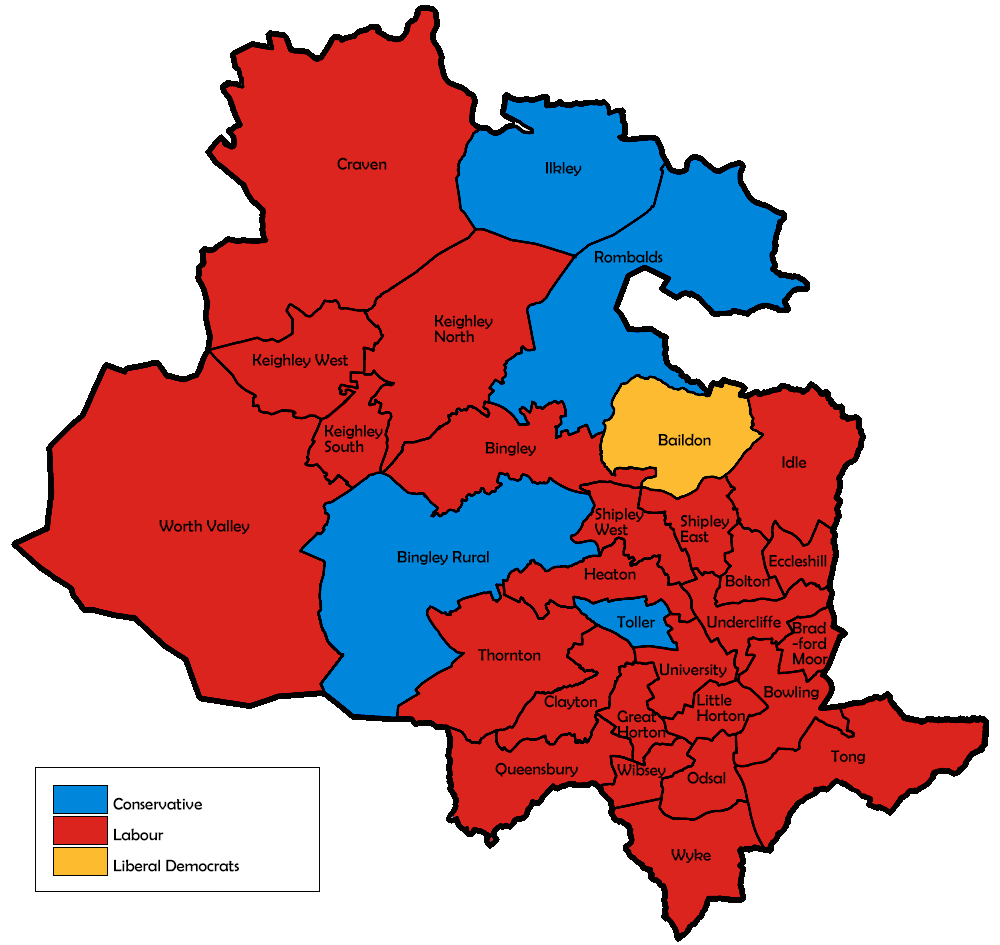
1995 results map

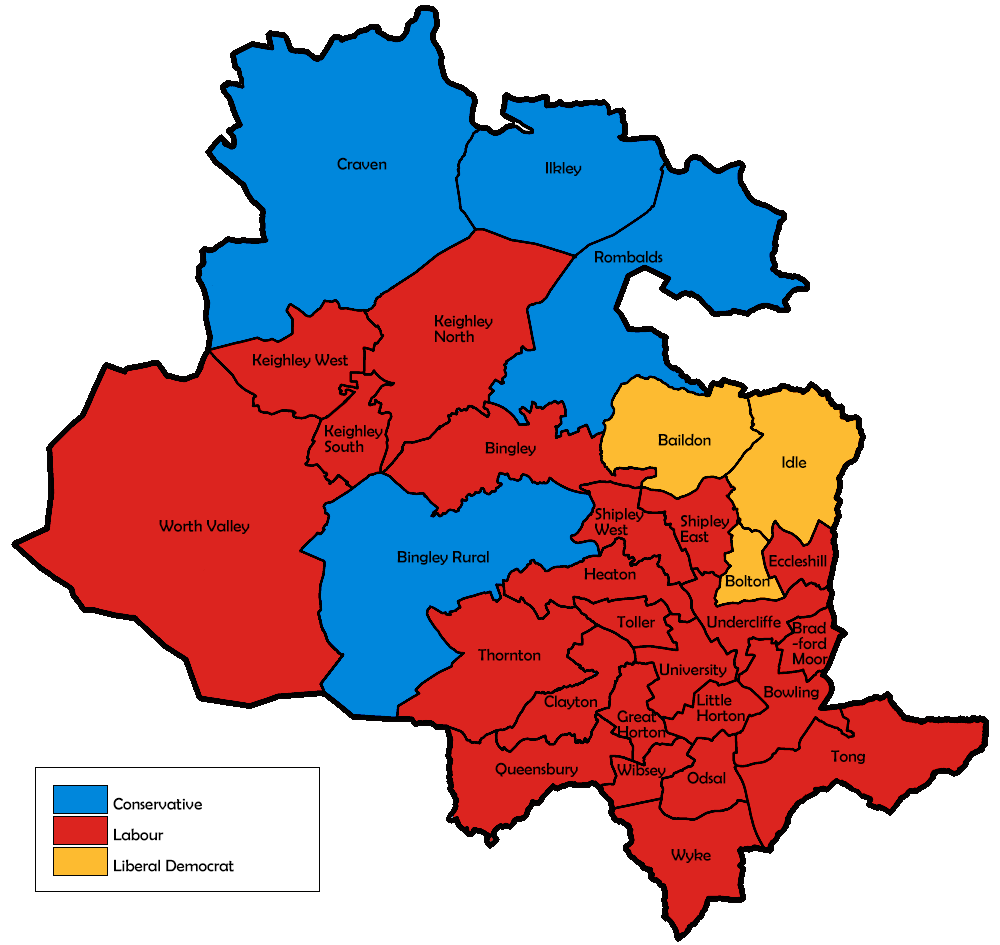
1996 results map

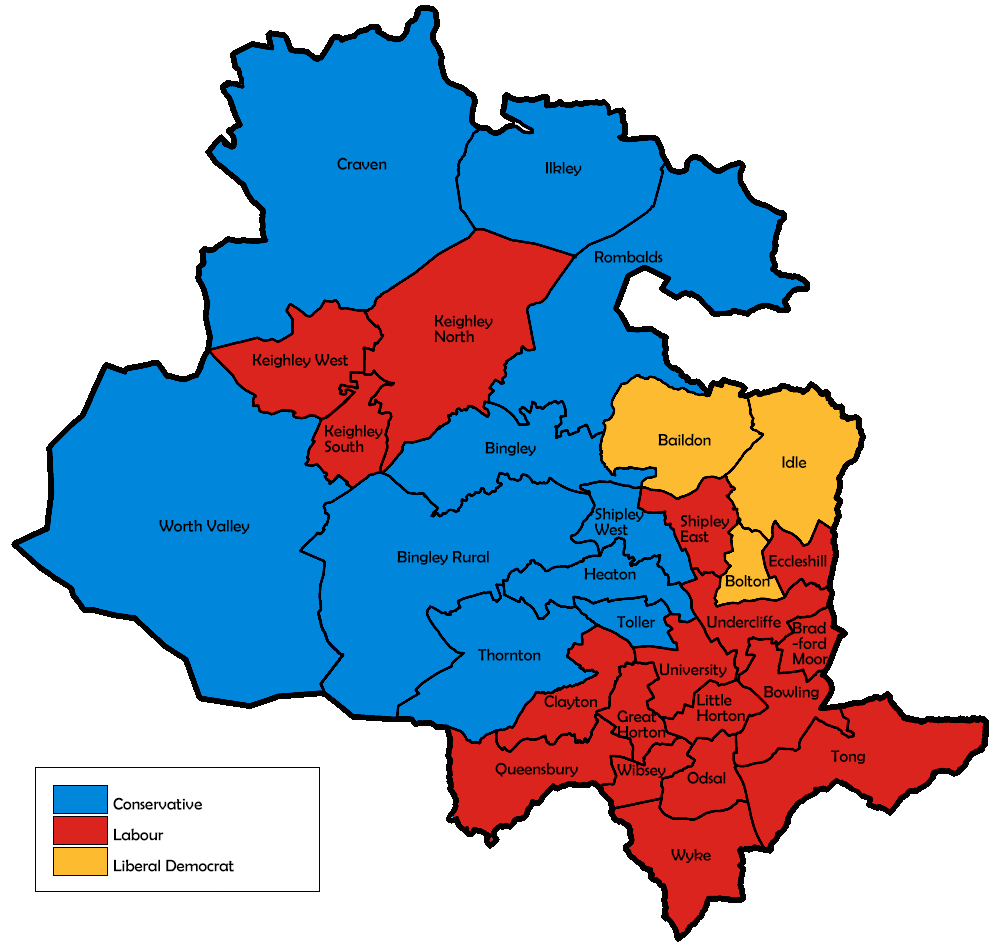
1998 results map

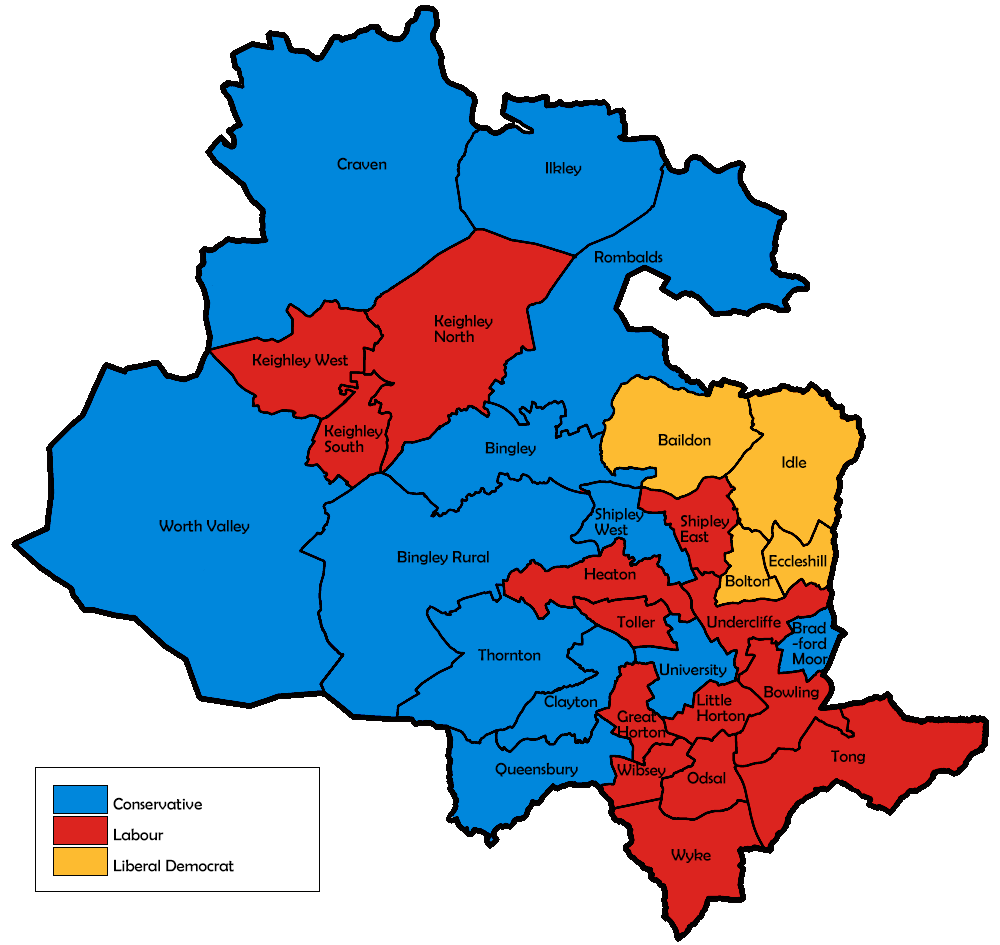
1999 results map

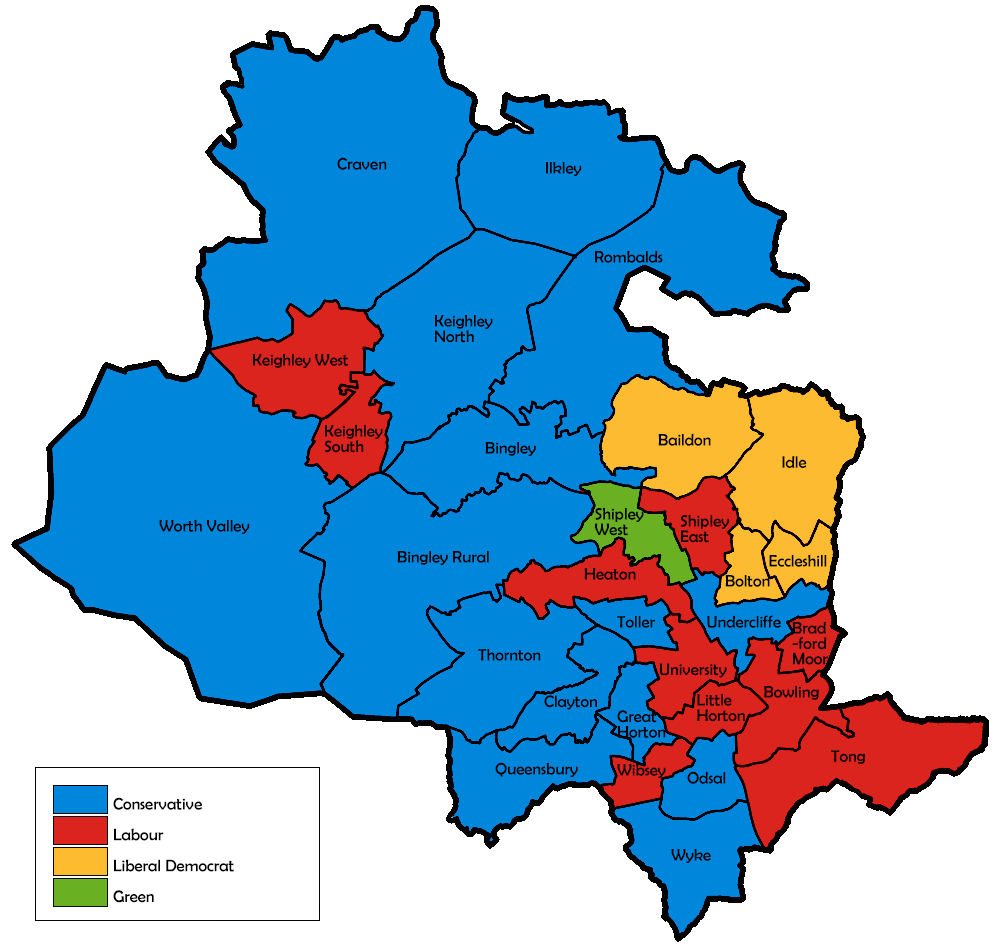
2000 results map

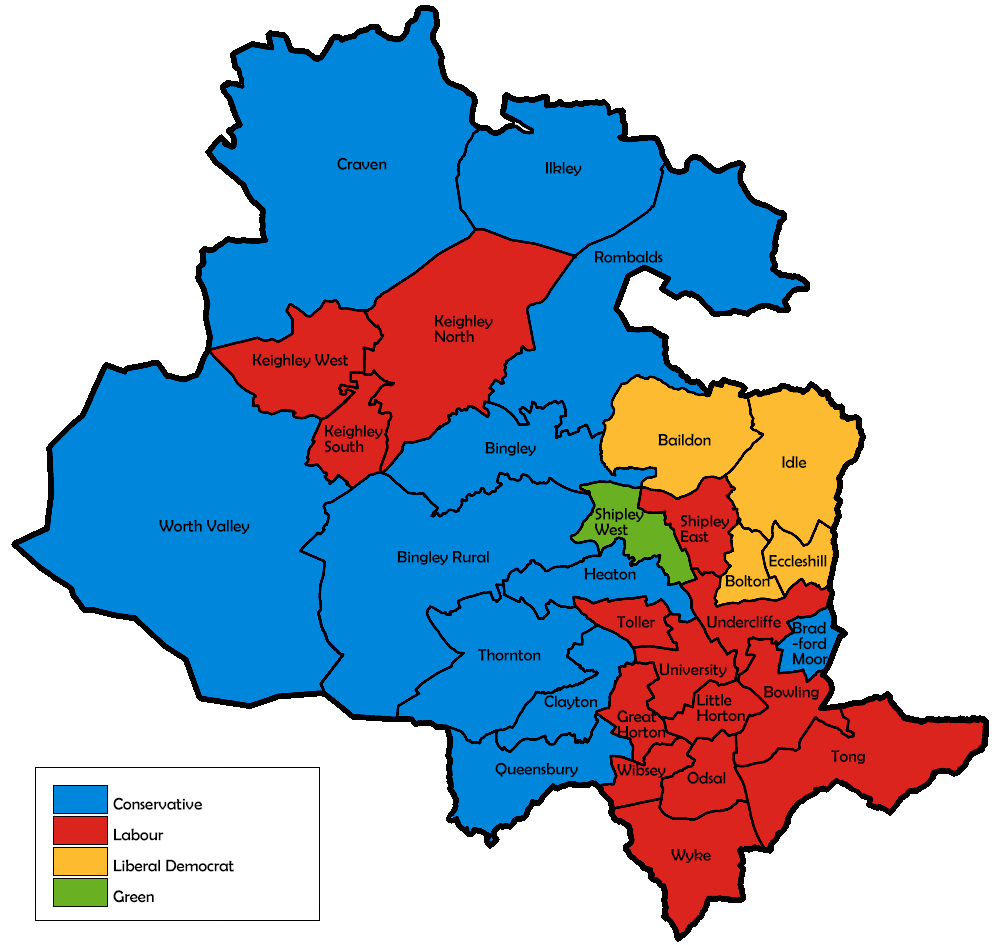
2002 results map

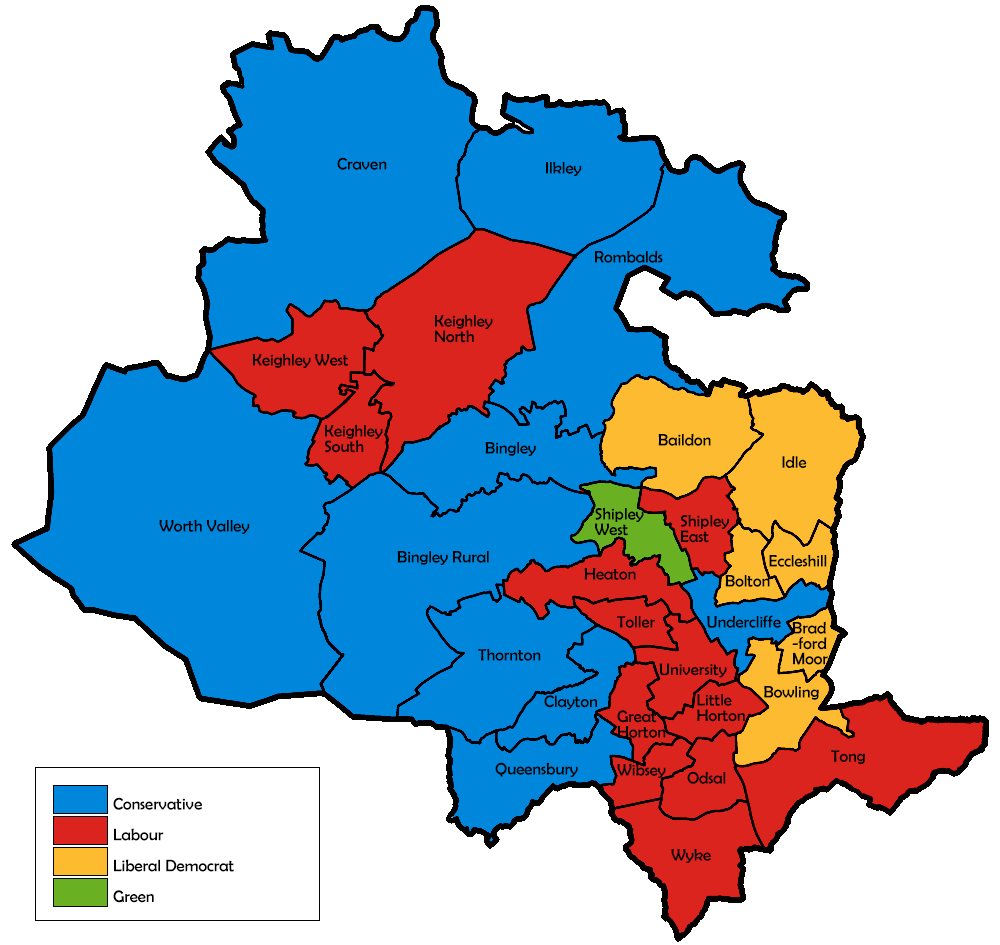
2003 results map

2004 results map

2006 results map

2007 results map

2008 results map

2010 results map

2011 results map

2012 results map

2014 results map

2015 results map

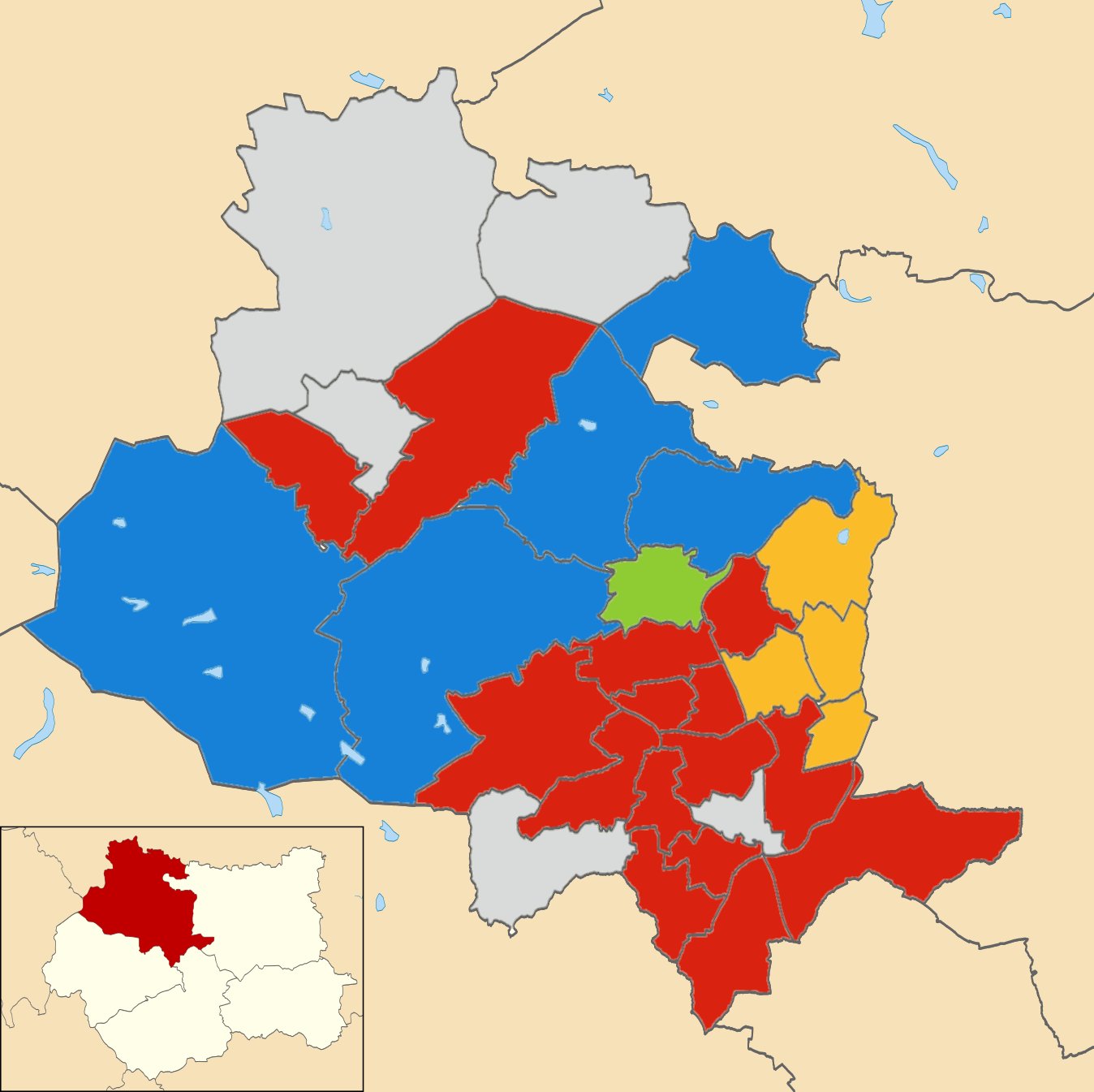
2016 results map

2018 results map

2019 results map

2021 results map

2022 results map

2023 results map

2024 results map

2026 results map

== By-election results ==
=== 1994–1998 ===
Heaton By-Election 26 September 1996
Party	Candidate	Votes	%	±%
Conservative		2,041	50.4	
Labour		1,808	44.6	
Liberal Democrats		202	5.0	
Majority		233	5.8	
Turnout		4,051	34.8	
Conservative gain from Labour		Swing		

Shipley West By-Election 9 October 1997
Party	Candidate	Votes	%	±%
Labour		1,263	36.8	−6.7
Conservative		1,222	35.6	−0.6
Green		667	19.4	+8.0
Liberal Democrats		284	8.3	−0.6
Majority		41	1.2	
Turnout		3,436		
Labour hold		Swing		

Baildon By-Election 20 November 1997
Party	Candidate	Votes	%	±%
Liberal Democrats		1,614	52.3	−1.0
Conservative		1,077	34.9	−0.7
Labour		372	12.1	+1.0
Independent		22	0.7	+0.7
Majority		537	17.4	
Turnout		3,085	24.6	
Liberal Democrats hold		Swing		

=== 1998–2002 ===
Little Horton By-Election 18 March 1999
Party	Candidate	Votes	%	±%
Labour		1,227	60.2	+18.5
Conservative		538	26.4	−14.2
Liberal Democrats		272	13.4	+4.3
Majority		689	33.8	
Turnout		2,037	17.0	
Labour hold		Swing		

Bowling By-Election 22 March 2001
Party	Candidate	Votes	%	±%
Labour	Tony Niland	1,014	44.0	−8.4
Conservative	Zameer Shah	777	33.7	+5.4
Liberal Democrats	Rupert Oliver	473	20.5	+8.6
Majority		237	10.3	
Turnout		2,264	18.6	
Labour hold		Swing		

Queensbury By-Election 7 June 2001
Party	Candidate	Votes	%	±%
Labour		3,217	45.5	+16.0
Conservative		2,744	38.8	−15.8
Liberal Democrats		892	12.6	−4.6
Independent		203	2.9	−2.0
Asian		13	0.2	+0.2
Majority		473	6.7	
Turnout		7,069	53.3	
Labour hold		Swing		

Bingley Rural By-Election 6 December 2001
Party	Candidate	Votes	%	±%
Conservative	Juliette Kinsey	1,576	65.2	−0.7
Labour	James Newton	642	26.6	+4.7
Liberal Democrats	James Stewart	150	6.2	−2.4
Green	John Love	50	2.1	−1.9
Majority		934	38.6	
Turnout		2,418	20.0	
Conservative hold		Swing		

=== 2002–2006 ===
Great Horton By-Election 16 October 2003
Party	Candidate	Votes	%	±%
Labour	Liz Devlin	926	36.9	−0.9
Conservative	Richard Milczanowski	764	30.4	+8.3
Liberal Democrats	Paul Michell	692	27.6	+10.5
Green	Derek Curtis	129	5.1	−1.5
Majority		162	6.5	
Turnout		2,511	23.4	
Labour gain from Conservative		Swing		

Craven By-Election 16 March 2006
Party	Candidate	Votes	%	±%
Conservative	Andrew Naylor	1,304	57.0	+13.4
Labour	Steven Carter	669	29.2	+10.7
Liberal Democrats	Frances McAulay	315	13.8	−3.7
Majority		635	27.8	
Turnout		2,288	18.7	
Conservative hold		Swing		

Keighley West By-Election 23 March 2006
Party	Candidate	Votes	%	±%
Labour	Angela Sinfield	1,819	47.0	+22.2
BNP	Ian Dawson	1,216	31.4	+2.3
Conservative	Lionel Lockley	627	16.2	−3.8
Liberal Democrats	Victoria Salmons	208	5.4	−4.8
Majority		603	15.6	
Turnout		3,870	35.1	
Labour gain from BNP		Swing		

=== 2006–2010 ===
Bingley Ward By-Election, 4 December 2008
Party	Candidate	Votes	%	±%
Conservative	John Allan Pennington	1,949		
Labour	Andrew David Mawson	689		
Liberal Democrats	Jean Taylor	332		
Green	Arthur Albert John Arnold	175		
Democratic Nationalists	Jim Lewthwaite	61		
UKIP	Jason Paul Smith	49		
Majority		1,260		
Turnout		3,262	24.99	

=== 2010–2014 ===
Worth Valley Ward By-Election 25 November 2010
Party	Candidate	Votes	%	±%
Conservative	Russell Brown	1,020		
Labour	Mark Bernard Curtis	697		
Green	Robert Edward Swindells	235		
Liberal Democrats	Sharon Catherine Purvis	180		
Majority		323		
Turnout		2,139	19.46	

Great Horton By-Election 24 November 2011
Party	Candidate	Votes	%	±%
Labour	Abdul Jabar	1,993	58.6	−1.1
Conservative	Mehrban Hussain	705	20.7	−5.0
Liberal Democrats	Mary Slingsby	337	9.9	−3.3
UKIP	Jason Paul Smith	294	8.6	(+8.6)
Green	Celia Ruth Hickson	73	2.1	(+2.1)
Majority		1,288	37.9	+3.9
Turnout		3,402	27.1	−8.5
Labour hold		Swing	3.9	

Wharfedale by-election 15 November 2012
Party	Candidate	Votes	%	±%
Conservative	Jackie Whiteley	1,353	54.03	−6.77
Labour	David Green	485	19.37	+0.63
Green	Janet Souyave	320	12.78	−2.47
Liberal Democrats	Paul Treadwell	222	8.87	+3.66
UKIP	Samuel Fletcher	124	4.95	N/A
Majority		868	34.66	
Turnout		2,516	27.51	−13.02
Conservative hold		Swing		

=== 2014–2018 ===
Wibsey by-election 14 July 2016
Party	Candidate	Votes	%	±%
Labour	Joanne Lisa Sharp	1,207	51	
UKIP	Jason Paul Smith	655	27	
Conservative	Richard Ian Sheard	451	19	
Liberal Democrats	Angharad Elizabeth Griffiths	70	3	
Majority		552	23	
Turnout		2,383	23	
Labour hold		Swing		

Queensbury by-election 4 May 2017
Party	Candidate	Votes	%	±%
Conservative	Andrew John Senior	2,175	56	
Independent	Jason Paul Smith	732	19	
Labour	Mobeen Hussain	697	18	
Green	Eithne Mary Dodwell	143	4	
Liberal Democrats	Mary Whitrick	135	3	
Majority		1,443	37	
Turnout		3,882	32	
Conservative hold		Swing		

=== 2018–2022 ===
Bolton and Undercliffe by-election 7 February 2019
Party	Candidate	Votes	%	±%
Liberal Democrats	Rachel Sunderland	1,733	51.3	+9.0
Labour	Amriz Hussain	1,153	34.1	−10.6
Conservative	Ranbir Singh	418	12.4	+2.4
Green	Phil Worsnop	73	2.2	−0.8
Majority		580	17.2	
Turnout		3,377		
Liberal Democrats gain from Labour		Swing		

=== 2022–2026 ===
Worth Valley by-election 12 February 2026
Party	Candidate	Votes	%	±%
Conservative	Paul Golding	1,815	51.7	−4.7
Reform	Andrew Judson	917	26.1	+26.1
Labour	Peter Kates	425	12.1	−19.6
Green	Josie McMaster	245	7.0	−0.9
Liberal Democrats	Kay Kirkham	83	2.4	−1.6
Independent	Sabine Ebert-Forbes	29	0.8	+0.8
Majority		898	25.6	
Turnout		3,514		
Conservative hold		Swing		
