= 1991 City of Bradford Metropolitan District Council election =

1991 UK local government election

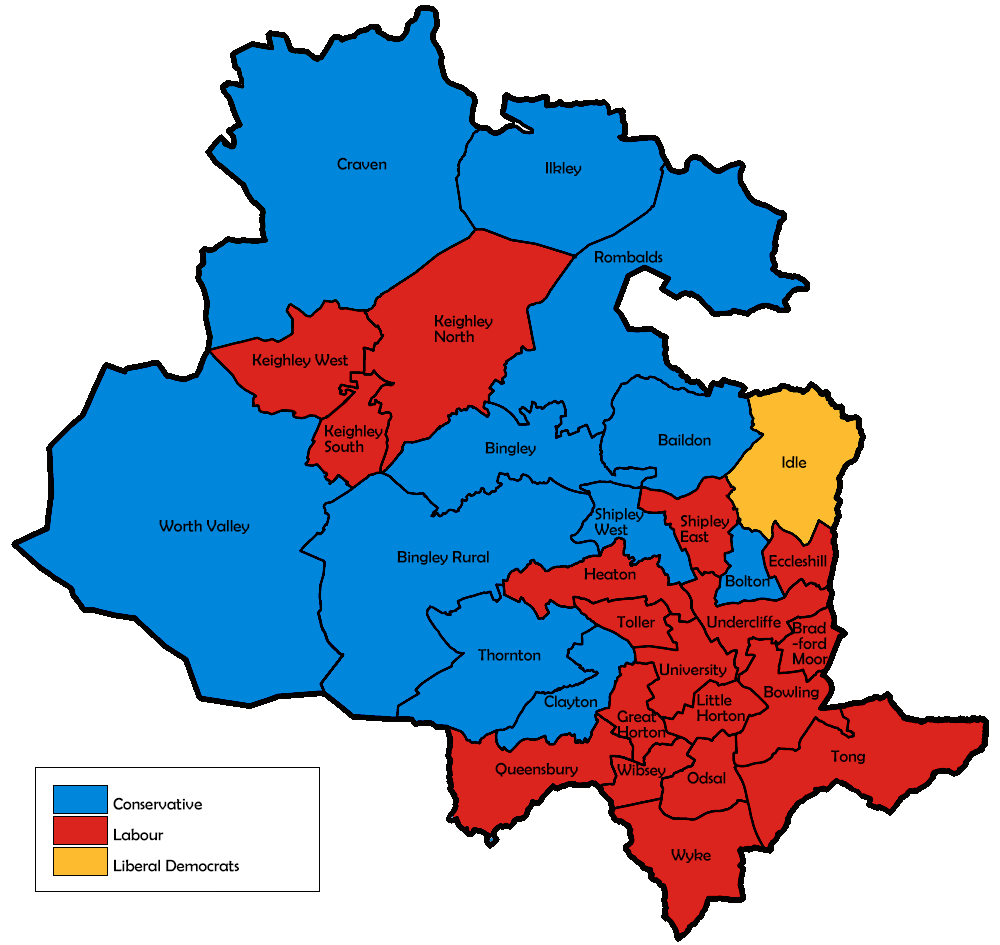
Map of the results for the 1991 Bradford council election.

The 1991 City of Bradford Metropolitan District Council elections were held on Thursday, 2 May 1991, with one third of the council up for election. Labour retained control of the council.

== Election results ==
Bradford local election result 1991
Party	Seats	Gains	Losses	Net gain/loss	Seats %	Votes %	Votes	+/−
Labour	18	6	0	▲6	60.0	43.8	66,373	-6.6
Conservative	11	1	7	▼6	36.7	38.6	58,449	+2.5
Liberal Democrats	1	1	1	Steady	3.3	15.2	23,049	+6.1
Green	0	0	0	Steady	0.0	2.3	3,440	-1.7
Independent	0	0	0	Steady	0.0	0.1	145	-0.3
Communist	0	0	0	Steady	0.0	0.0	49	+0.0

This result had the following consequences for the total number of seats on the council after the elections:

Party	Previous council	New council
Labour	47	53
Conservatives	41	35
Liberal Democrat	2	2
Total	90	90
Working majority	4	16

== Ward results ==
Baildon
Party	Candidate	Votes	%	±%
Conservative	K. Poulton	3,032	48.7	+2.6
Liberal Democrats	E. Blaine	1,492	23.9	−8.4
Labour	J. Flood	1,409	22.6	+5.5
Green	C. Harris	297	4.8	+0.3
Majority		1,540	24.7	+11.0
Turnout		6,230		
Conservative hold		Swing	+5.5	

Bingley
Party	Candidate	Votes	%	±%
Conservative	N. Roper	2,618	48.1	+1.8
Labour	M. Gregory	1,972	36.2	−4.1
Liberal Democrats	S. Whitehead	637	11.7	+4.1
Green	M. Thompson	214	3.9	−1.7
Majority		646	11.9	+6.0
Turnout		5,441		
Conservative hold		Swing	+2.9	

Bingley Rural
Party	Candidate	Votes	%	±%
Conservative	G. Smith	2,987	56.2	+2.6
Labour	G. Carey	1,233	23.2	−8.3
Liberal Democrats	M. Fielden	801	15.1	+7.6
Green	M. Love	296	5.6	−1.8
Majority		1,754	33.0	+10.9
Turnout		5,317		
Conservative hold		Swing	+5.4	

Bolton
Party	Candidate	Votes	%	±%
Conservative	F. Lee	2,065	46.8	+5.1
Liberal Democrats	J. Ward	1,201	27.2	+16.4
Labour	M. Yaqoob	1,142	25.9	−21.5
Majority		864	19.6	+14.0
Turnout		4,408		
Conservative hold		Swing	-5.6	

Bowling
Party	Candidate	Votes	%	±%
Labour	M. Qureshi	2,379	55.4	−18.6
Conservative	B. Moore	972	22.6	+5.1
Liberal Democrats	J. Collins	945	22.0	+13.6
Majority		1,407	32.8	−23.7
Turnout		4,296		
Labour hold		Swing	-11.8	

Bradford Moor
Party	Candidate	Votes	%	±%
Labour	B. Singh	2,669	67.1	−11.9
Conservative	H. Ibbotson	621	15.6	+1.7
Liberal Democrats	H. Middleton	516	13.0	+13.0
Green	I. Davis	172	4.3	−2.8
Majority		2,048	51.5	−13.6
Turnout		3,978		
Labour hold		Swing	-6.8	

Clayton
Party	Candidate	Votes	%	±%
Conservative	R. Farley	2,772	51.6	+6.3
Labour	P. Chippendale	2,162	40.3	−7.0
Liberal Democrats	K. Margison	433	8.1	+8.1
Majority		610	11.4	+9.4
Turnout		5,367		
Conservative hold		Swing	+6.6	

Craven
Party	Candidate	Votes	%	±%
Conservative	D. Harrison	2,925	51.9	+4.7
Liberal Democrats	J. Brooksbank	1,277	22.6	+4.4
Labour	M. Newton	1,224	21.7	−7.5
Green	G. Lambert	212	3.8	+3.8
Majority		1,648	29.2	+11.2
Turnout		5,638		
Conservative gain from Liberal Democrats		Swing	+0.1	

Eccleshill
Party	Candidate	Votes	%	±%
Labour	G. Midwood	2,245	50.1	−4.9
Conservative	B. Larkin	1,565	34.9	+4.0
Liberal Democrats	M. Attenborough	669	14.9	+5.4
Majority		680	15.2	−8.9
Turnout		4,479		
Labour gain from Conservative		Swing	-4.4	

Great Horton
Party	Candidate	Votes	%	±%
Labour	J. Godward	2,567	52.5	−5.4
Conservative	M. Crabtree	1,745	35.7	+3.1
Liberal Democrats	M. Egan	424	8.7	+8.7
Green	M. Knott	152	3.1	−6.4
Majority		822	16.8	−8.6
Turnout		4,888		
Labour hold		Swing	-4.2	

Heaton
Party	Candidate	Votes	%	±%
Labour	L. Maguire	2,891	47.7	−4.2
Conservative	C. Hobson	2,557	42.2	+2.9
Liberal Democrats	M. Margison	455	7.5	+7.5
Green	K. Warnes	154	2.5	−6.2
Majority		334	5.5	−7.1
Turnout		6,057		
Labour gain from Conservative		Swing	-3.5	

Idle
Party	Candidate	Votes	%	±%
Liberal Democrats	C. Hare	2,400	43.9	+13.6
Conservative	H. Lycett	1,731	31.7	+0.4
Labour	T. Britton	1,336	24.4	−12.5
Majority		669	12.2	+6.5
Turnout		5,467		
Liberal Democrats gain from Conservative		Swing	+6.4	

Ilkley
Party	Candidate	Votes	%	±%
Conservative	B. Smith	3,415	61.8	+7.2
Labour	K. Best	1,185	21.5	−1.9
Liberal Democrats	P. Cheney	922	16.7	+4.0
Majority		2,230	40.4	+9.1
Turnout		5,522		
Conservative hold		Swing	+4.5	

Keighley North
Party	Candidate	Votes	%	±%
Labour	M. Slater	2,762	46.3	−2.2
Conservative	A. Henderson	2,403	40.3	+2.8
Liberal Democrats	J. Beaumont	615	10.3	+3.1
Green	M. Crowson	182	3.0	−3.7
Majority		359	6.0	−5.1
Turnout		5,962		
Labour gain from Conservative		Swing	-2.5	

Keighley South
Party	Candidate	Votes	%	±%
Labour	F. Sunderland	2,710	64.8	−7.1
Conservative	J. Maxfield	865	20.7	+3.1
Liberal Democrats	B. Salmons	351	8.4	+2.3
Independent	R. Dobson	145	3.5	+3.5
Green	L. Danson	111	2.6	−1.7
Majority		1,845	44.1	−10.3
Turnout		4,182		
Labour hold		Swing	-5.1	

Keighley West
Party	Candidate	Votes	%	±%
Labour	B. Thorne	2,843	52.3	−2.3
Conservative	M. Startin	1,839	33.8	+0.5
Liberal Democrats	G. Morgan	554	10.2	+2.5
Green	W. Howe	199	3.7	−0.7
Majority		1,004	18.5	−2.7
Turnout		5,435		
Labour hold		Swing	-1.4	

Little Horton
Party	Candidate	Votes	%	±%
Labour	A. Hussain	2,383	64.5	−7.2
Liberal Democrats	A. Griffiths	696	18.8	+6.0
Conservative	G. Johnson	618	16.7	+1.2
Majority		1,687	45.6	−10.5
Turnout		3,697		
Labour hold		Swing	-6.6	

Odsal
Party	Candidate	Votes	%	±%
Labour	D. Green	2,796	50.9	−4.5
Conservative	M. Riaz	1,677	30.5	−4.6
Liberal Democrats	D. Rowley	1,019	18.5	+9.1
Majority		1,119	20.4	+0.1
Turnout		5,492		
Labour gain from Conservative		Swing	+0.0	

Queensbury
Party	Candidate	Votes	%	±%
Labour	J. Womersley	2,706	47.3	−7.7
Conservative	E. Sunderland	2,309	40.4	−4.6
Liberal Democrats	J. Saul	707	12.4	+12.4
Majority		397	6.9	−3.2
Turnout		5,722		
Labour gain from Conservative		Swing	-1.5	

Rombalds
Party	Candidate	Votes	%	±%
Conservative	R. Wightman	3,643	59.3	+2.0
Labour	H. Gundry	1,344	21.9	−6.6
Liberal Democrats	V. Whelan	1,155	18.8	+4.6
Majority		2,299	37.4	+8.7
Turnout		6,142		
Conservative hold		Swing	+4.3	

Shipley East
Party	Candidate	Votes	%	±%
Labour	R. Redfern	2,384	56.6	−10.2
Conservative	J. Carroll	1,196	28.4	+5.0
Liberal Democrats	J. Whitehead	628	14.9	+5.1
Majority		1,188	28.2	−15.2
Turnout		4,208		
Labour hold		Swing	-7.6	

Shipley West
Party	Candidate	Votes	%	±%
Conservative	J. Evans	2,669	43.8	+1.7
Labour	J. Phillips	2,390	39.2	−5.0
Liberal Democrats	T. Willis	692	11.4	+4.00
Green	D. Ford	342	5.6	−0.7
Majority		279	4.6	+2.4
Turnout		6,093		
Conservative hold		Swing	+3.3	

Thornton
Party	Candidate	Votes	%	±%
Conservative	J. Buffham	2,329	45.3	+4.0
Labour	P. Wilkinson	2,143	41.7	−5.4
Liberal Democrats	H. Wright	494	9.6	+3.6
Green	P. Daniels	177	3.4	−2.3
Majority		186	3.6	−2.2
Turnout		5,143		
Conservative hold		Swing	+4.7	

Toller
Party	Candidate	Votes	%	±%
Labour	Y. Tough	3,064	60.3	+6.1
Conservative	H. Greed	1,430	28.2	+0.2
Liberal Democrats	S. Boulton	390	7.7	−1.3
Green	P. Braham	194	3.8	+3.8
Majority		1,634	32.2	+5.9
Turnout		5,078		
Labour hold		Swing	+2.9	

Tong
Party	Candidate	Votes	%	±%
Labour	T. Mahon	2,066	65.5	−10.7
Conservative	D. Owen	732	23.2	−0.6
Liberal Democrats	K. Robinson	356	11.3	+11.3
Majority		1,334	42.3	−10.1
Turnout		3,154		
Labour hold		Swing	-5.0	

Undercliffe
Party	Candidate	Votes	%	±%
Labour	D. Fairfax	2,582	56.5	−6.4
Conservative	A. Wade	1,257	27.5	+0.2
Liberal Democrats	E. Hallmann	590	12.9	+3.1
Green	S. Stepan	139	3.0	+3.0
Majority		1,325	29.0	−6.7
Turnout		4,568		
Labour hold		Swing	-3.3	

University
Party	Candidate	Votes	%	±%
Labour	A. Ahmed	3,613	70.9	+3.6
Conservative	J. Austin	728	14.3	−9.5
Liberal Democrats	C. Devonshire	400	7.8	+7.8
Green	D. Stepan	306	6.0	−2.9
Communist	R. Young	49	1.0	+1.0
Majority		2,885	56.6	+13.1
Turnout		5,096		
Labour hold		Swing	+6.5	

Wibsey
Party	Candidate	Votes	%	±%
Labour	R. Berry	2,209	46.3	−6.3
Conservative	J. Robertshaw	1,727	36.2	+3.5
Liberal Democrats	B. Boulton	832	17.4	+6.5
Majority		482	10.1	−9.8
Turnout		4,768		
Labour gain from Conservative		Swing	-4.9	

Worth Valley
Party	Candidate	Votes	%	±%
Conservative	M. Ellis	2,402	47.8	+3.8
Labour	R. Kelly	1,701	33.8	−7.3
Liberal Democrats	T. Brooksbank	631	12.5	+3.5
Green	A. Speller	293	5.8	+0.1
Majority		701	13.9	+11.1
Turnout		5,027		
Conservative hold		Swing	+5.5	

Wyke
Party	Candidate	Votes	%	±%
Labour	M. Beeley	2,263	48.7	−10.8
Conservative	V. Owen	1,620	34.8	+5.6
Liberal Democrats	S. Cawood	767	16.5	+5.2
Majority		643	13.8	−16.5
Turnout		4,650		
Labour hold		Swing	-8.2	
