= 1990 City of Bradford Metropolitan District Council election =

1990 UK local government election

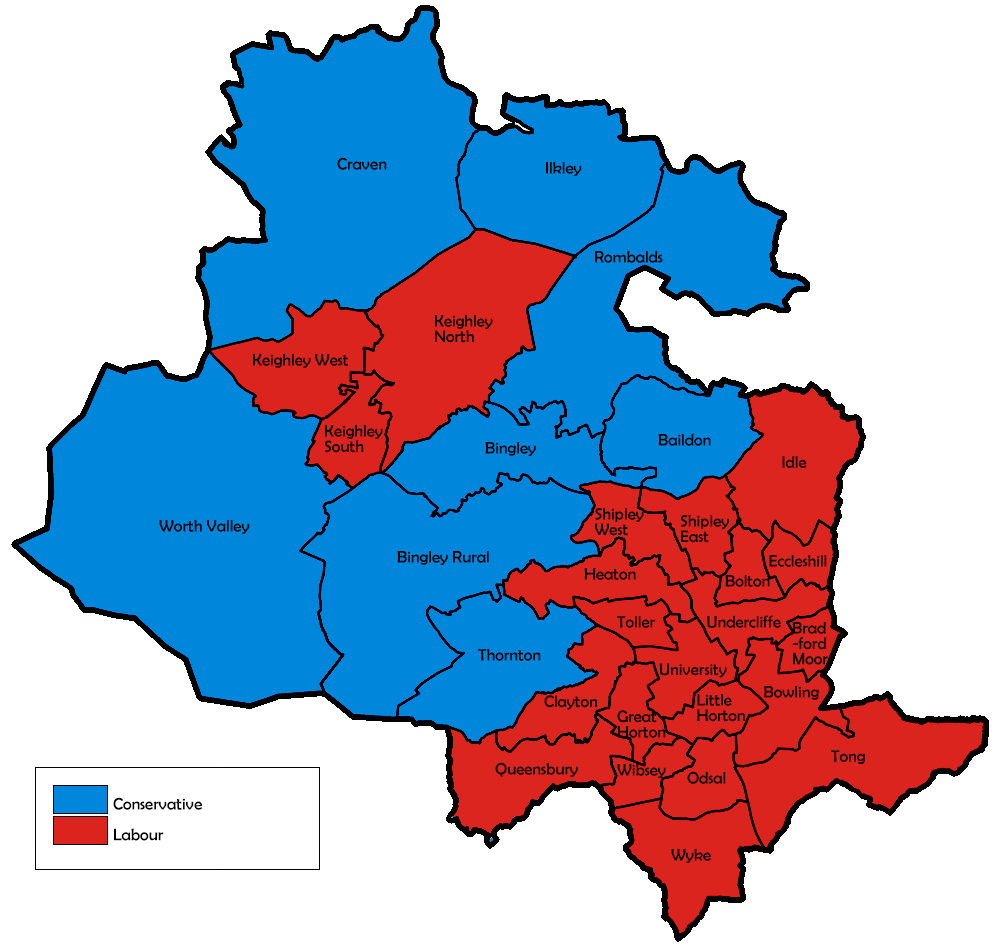
Map of the results for the 1990 Bradford council election.

The 1990 City of Bradford Metropolitan District Council elections were held on Thursday, 4 May 1990, with one third of the council up for election as well as vacancies in Great Horton & Ilkley to be elected. Labour had suffered a defection prior to the election in the University ward, with the sitting councillor attempting, unsuccessfully, to defend it as a Conservative. Labour regained control of the council from no overall control following numerous gains from the Conservatives.

== Election results ==
Bradford local election result 1990
Party	Seats	Gains	Losses	Net gain/loss	Seats %	Votes %	Votes	+/−
Labour	24	4	0	▲4	75.0	50.4	91,284	+7.3
Conservative	8	0	4	▼4	25.0	36.1	65,322	-7.6
Liberal Democrats	0	0	0	Steady	0.0	9.1	16,514	-1.3
Green	0	0	0	Steady	0.0	4.0	7,220	+3.7
Independent	0	0	0	Steady	0.0	0.4	663	+0.2

This result had the following consequences for the total number of seats on the council after the elections:

Party	Previous council	New council
Labour	43	47
Conservatives	45	41
Liberal Democrat	2	2
Total	90	90
Working majority	-4	4

== Ward results ==
Baildon
Party	Candidate	Votes	%	±%
Conservative	C. Charlesworth	3,381	46.0	+1.9
Liberal Democrats	M. Fielden	2,378	32.4	−8.4
Labour	R. Watson	1,258	17.1	+5.1
Green	M. Harris	328	4.5	+1.4
Majority		1,003	13.7	+10.4
Turnout		7,345		
Conservative hold		Swing	+4.6	

Bingley
Party	Candidate	Votes	%	±%
Conservative	A. Nunn	2,908	46.3	−6.2
Labour	M. Slater	2,535	40.4	+8.0
Liberal Democrats	A. Micklem	477	7.6	−0.2
Green	M. Thompson	356	5.7	+5.7
Majority		373	5.9	−14.3
Turnout		6,276		
Conservative hold		Swing	-7.1	

Bingley Rural
Party	Candidate	Votes	%	±%
Conservative	E. Eaton	3,467	53.6	−3.3
Labour	M. Gregory	2,038	31.5	+10.2
Liberal Democrats	S. Whitehead	484	7.5	−0.8
Green	M. Love	479	7.4	+7.4
Majority		1,429	22.1	−13.5
Turnout		6,468		
Conservative hold		Swing	-6.7	

Bolton
Party	Candidate	Votes	%	±%
Labour	M. Young	2,445	47.4	+8.4
Conservative	J. Doyle	2,154	41.8	−9.7
Liberal Democrats	M. Attenborough	559	10.8	+1.3
Majority		291	5.6	−6.8
Turnout		5,158		
Labour hold		Swing	+9.0	

Bowling
Party	Candidate	Votes	%	±%
Labour	J. Ellison	4,122	74.0	+6.9
Conservative	H. Ibbotson	978	17.6	−3.8
Liberal Democrats	G. Beacher	469	8.4	−3.2
Majority		3,144	56.5	+10.8
Turnout		5,569		
Labour hold		Swing	+5.4	

Bradford Moor
Party	Candidate	Votes	%	±%
Labour	R. Billheimer	4,087	79.0	+18.1
Conservative	S. Swaine	718	13.9	−9.3
Green	I. Davis	367	7.1	−0.4
Majority		3,369	65.1	+27.4
Turnout		5,172		
Labour hold		Swing	+13.7	

Clayton
Party	Candidate	Votes	%	±%
Labour	G. Mitchell	2,909	47.3	+3.7
Conservative	R. Kelly	2,787	45.3	−11.1
Green	L. Shawcross	454	7.4	+7.4
Majority		122	2.0	−10.7
Turnout		6,150		
Labour hold		Swing	+7.4	

Craven
Party	Candidate	Votes	%	±%
Conservative	E. Dawson	2,911	47.2	−6.5
Labour	R. Kelly	1,803	29.2	+10.1
Liberal Democrats	G. Morgan	1,127	18.3	−9.0
Green	G. Lambert	330	5.3	+5.3
Majority		1,108	18.0	−8.4
Turnout		6,171		
Conservative hold		Swing	-8.3	

Eccleshill
Party	Candidate	Votes	%	±%
Labour	P. Lancaster	2,936	55.0	+7.7
Conservative	B. Larkin	1,650	30.9	−12.7
Liberal Democrats	I. Horner	510	9.6	+0.5
Green	D. Stepan	238	4.5	+4.5
Majority		1,286	24.1	+20.3
Turnout		5,334		
Labour gain from Conservative		Swing	+10.2	

Great Horton
Party	Candidate	Votes	%	±%
Labour	S. Collard	3,478	57.9	+4.6
Labour	B. Lynch	3,006		
Conservative	M. Crabtree	1,955	32.5	−6.4
Conservative	N. Roper	1,597		
Green	M. Knott	573	9.5	+9.5
Majority		1,523	25.4	+11.1
Turnout		6,006		
Labour hold		Swing		
Labour hold		Swing	+5.5	

Heaton
Party	Candidate	Votes	%	±%
Labour	C. James	3,544	51.9	+9.6
Conservative	K. Foulsham	2,683	39.3	−10.1
Green	K. Timms	595	8.7	+8.7
Majority		861	12.6	+5.5
Turnout		6,822		
Labour hold		Swing	+9.8	

Idle
Party	Candidate	Votes	%	±%
Labour	K. Baxter	2,335	36.9	+4.3
Conservative	R. Priestley	1,976	31.2	+1.1
Liberal Democrats	S. Cawood	1,916	30.3	−7.0
Independent	A. Garnett	1.1	1.6	+1.6
Majority		359	5.7	+1.1
Turnout		6,328		
Labour hold		Swing	+1.6	

Ilkley
Party	Candidate	Votes	%	±%
Conservative	A. Hawkesworth	3,449	54.6	−7.0
Conservative	S. Lawson	3,284		
Labour	R. Fox	1,474	23.3	+3.3
Labour	J. Luiba	1,351		
Liberal Democrats	R. Battey	802	12.7	−2.8
Liberal Democrats	P. Cheney	641		
Green	S. Woodhouse	591	9.4	+9.4
Green	R. Hamilton	458		
Majority		1,975	31.3	−10.3
Turnout		6,316		
Conservative hold		Swing		
Conservative hold		Swing	-5.1	

Keighley North
Party	Candidate	Votes	%	±%
Labour	B. Wheeler	3,129	48.5	+4.8
Conservative	V. Earle	2,416	37.5	−11.0
Liberal Democrats	J. Beaumont	465	7.2	−0.6
Green	F. Hutchinson	439	6.8	+6.8
Majority		713	11.1	+6.4
Turnout		6,449		
Labour gain from Conservative		Swing	+7.9	

Keighley South
Party	Candidate	Votes	%	±%
Labour	L. Whiteley	3,701	71.9	+0.2
Conservative	D. Robertshaw	904	17.6	−3.4
Liberal Democrats	T. Brooksbank	315	6.1	−1.1
Green	J. Crowson	225	4.4	+4.4
Majority		2,797	54.4	+3.7
Turnout		5,145		
Labour hold		Swing	+1.8	

Keighley West
Party	Candidate	Votes	%	±%
Labour	I. Ellison-Wood	3,490	54.6	+4.4
Conservative	K. Flanagan	2,132	33.3	−7.3
Liberal Democrats	S. Green	491	7.7	−1.4
Green	C. Davidson	279	4.4	+4.4
Majority		1,358	21.2	+11.6
Turnout		6,392		
Labour hold		Swing	+5.8	

Little Horton
Party	Candidate	Votes	%	±%
Labour	M. Darr	3,455	71.6	+2.1
Conservative	J. Kahn	748	15.5	−5.0
Liberal Democrats	P. Robinson	619	12.8	+8.3
Majority		2,707	56.1	+7.1
Turnout		4,822		
Labour hold		Swing	+3.5	

Odsal
Party	Candidate	Votes	%	±%
Labour	M. Walters	3,727	55.4	+14.0
Conservative	E. Byrom	2,363	35.1	−14.4
Liberal Democrats	D. Rowley	637	9.5	+3.1
Majority		1,364	20.3	+12.1
Turnout		6,727		
Labour hold		Swing	+14.2	

Queensbury
Party	Candidate	Votes	%	±%
Labour	E. Hey	3,773	55.0	+11.9
Conservative	Neil Hartley	3,083	45.0	−0.9
Majority		690	10.1	+7.3
Turnout		6,856		
Labour hold		Swing	+6.4	

Rombalds
Party	Candidate	Votes	%	±%
Conservative	P. Gadsby-Peet	3,963	57.3	−4.8
Labour	K. Best	1,974	28.5	+6.9
Liberal Democrats	V. Whelan	984	14.2	−2.1
Majority		1,989	28.7	−11.7
Turnout		6,921		
Conservative hold		Swing	-5.8	

Shipley East
Party	Candidate	Votes	%	±%
Labour	T. Miller	3,520	66.8	+7.2
Conservative	P. Barker	1,233	23.4	−8.5
Liberal Democrats	J. Whitehead	515	9.8	+1.3
Majority		2,287	43.4	+15.6
Turnout		5,268		
Labour hold		Swing	+7.8	

Shipley West
Party	Candidate	Votes	%	±%
Labour	R. Cannell	3,157	44.2	+7.1
Conservative	D. Heseltine	3,002	42.1	−10.4
Liberal Democrats	T. Willis	525	7.4	−3.0
Green	M. Ford	453	6.3	+6.3
Majority		155	2.2	−13.1
Turnout		7,137		
Labour gain from Conservative		Swing	+8.7	

Thornton
Party	Candidate	Votes	%	±%
Labour	J. McAvoy	2,782	47.1	+11.0
Conservative	G. Chapman	2,438	41.3	−12.0
Liberal Democrats	A. Griffiths	352	6.0	−0.5
Green	C. Shawcross	337	5.7	+5.7
Majority		344	5.8	−11.4
Turnout		5,909		
Labour hold		Swing	+11.5	

Toller
Party	Candidate	Votes	%	±%
Labour	A. Hussein	3,499	54.3	−1.9
Conservative	H. Greed	1,805	28.0	−15.8
Liberal Democrats	A. Cruden	580	9.0	+9.0
Independent	A. Malik	562	8.7	+8.7
Majority		1,694	26.3	+13.9
Turnout		6,446		
Labour hold		Swing	+6.9	

Tong
Party	Candidate	Votes	%	±%
Labour	G. Sutcliffe	3,164	76.2	+7.2
Conservative	D. Owen	987	23.8	−0.4
Majority		2,177	52.4	+7.6
Turnout		4,151		
Labour hold		Swing	+3.8	

Undercliffe
Party	Candidate	Votes	%	±%
Labour	R. Sowman	3,395	63.0	+20.6
Conservative	B. Moore	1,470	27.3	−17.5
Liberal Democrats	E. Hallman	527	9.8	−3.1
Majority		1,925	35.7	+33.3
Turnout		5,392		
Labour hold		Swing	+19.0	

University
Party	Candidate	Votes	%	±%
Labour	M. Qureshi	4,844	67.3	−6.9
Conservative	M. Riaz	1,714	23.8	+7.2
Green	K. Warnes	640	8.9	+3.6
Majority		3,130	43.5	−14.2
Turnout		7,198		
Labour gain from Conservative		Swing	-7.0	

Wibsey
Party	Candidate	Votes	%	±%
Labour	K. Thomson	2,988	52.7	+8.5
Conservative	R. Sheard	1,858	32.8	−12.8
Liberal Democrats	B. Boulton	623	11.0	+0.7
Green	P. Braham	203	3.6	+3.6
Majority		1,130	19.9	+18.5
Turnout		5,672		
Labour hold		Swing	+10.6	

Worth Valley
Party	Candidate	Votes	%	±%
Conservative	S. Midgley	2,554	44.0	−14.3
Labour	D. Halsall	2,390	41.2	+6.9
Liberal Democrats	J. Brooksbank	527	9.1	+1.7
Green	M. Crowson	333	5.7	+5.7
Majority		164	2.8	−21.2
Turnout		5,804		
Conservative hold		Swing	-10.6	

Wyke
Party	Candidate	Votes	%	±%
Labour	D. Mangham	3,332	59.5	+9.8
Conservative	J. Robertshaw	1,635	29.2	−10.0
Liberal Democrats	J. Micklethwaite	632	11.3	+11.3
Majority		1,697	30.3	+19.8
Turnout		5,599		
Labour hold		Swing	+9.9	
