= 1983 City of Bradford Metropolitan District Council election =

1983 UK local government election

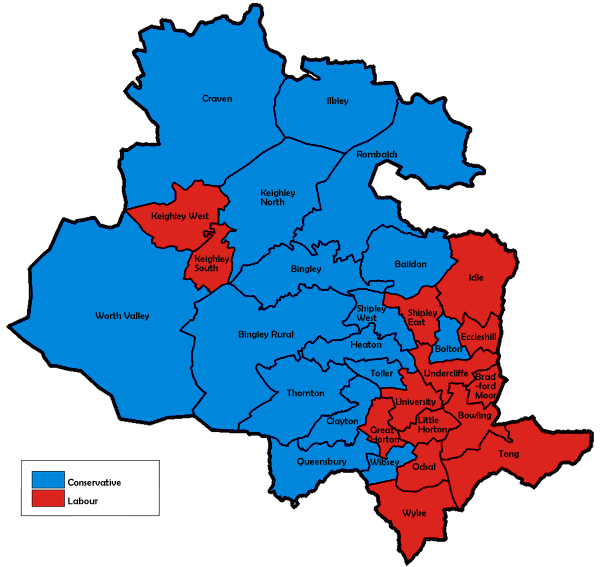
Map of the results for the 1983 Bradford council election.

Elections to City of Bradford Metropolitan District Council were held on Thursday, 5 May 1983, with one third of the council to be elected. The council remained under no overall control.

== Election result ==
Bradford local election result 1983
Party	Seats	Gains	Losses	Net gain/loss	Seats %	Votes %	Votes	+/−
Conservative	16	1	0	+1	53.3	40.2	61,335	+1.6%
Labour	14	0	1	-1	46.7	39.7	60,473	+7.0%
Alliance	0	0	0	0	0.0	20.0	30,432	-8.1%
Ecology	0	0	0	0	0.0	0.1	178	+0.0%
Communist	0	0	0	0	0.0	0.0	79	+0.0%

This result had the following consequences for the total number of seats on the council after the elections:

Party	Previous council	New council
Conservatives	43	44
Labour	41	40
Alliance	6	6
Total	90	90
Working majority	-4	-2

== Ward results ==
Baildon
Party	Candidate	Votes	%	±%
Conservative	A. Lightowler	2,780	45.7	+2.9
Alliance (Liberal)	I. Blaine	2,419	39.8	−4.4
Labour	E. English	878	14.4	+1.5
Majority		361	5.9	+4.6
Turnout		6,077		
Conservative hold		Swing	+3.6	

Bingley
Party	Candidate	Votes	%	±%
Conservative	T. Shaw	2,536	47.6	−3.7
Labour	G. Foster	1,847	34.7	+10.1
Alliance (Liberal)	N. Tregoning	943	17.7	−6.4
Majority		689	12.9	−13.8
Turnout		5,326		
Conservative hold		Swing	-6.9	

Bingley Rural
Party	Candidate	Votes	%	±%
Conservative	D. Conquest	3,203	62.2	+1.9
Labour	T. Ball	1,099	21.3	+4.9
Alliance (Liberal)	M. Greenwood	849	16.5	−6.8
Majority		2,104	40.8	+3.9
Turnout		5,151		
Conservative hold		Swing	-1.5	

Bolton
Party	Candidate	Votes	%	±%
Conservative	T. Hall	2,096	45.0	+3.5
Labour	G. Porter	1,638	35.2	+6.9
Alliance (SDP)	J. Minshull	925	19.8	−10.4
Majority		458	9.8	−1.3
Turnout		4,659		
Conservative hold		Swing	-1.7	

Bowling
Party	Candidate	Votes	%	±%
Labour	D. Coughlin	2,923	62.0	+3.9
Conservative	B. Moore	1,083	23.0	+1.4
Alliance (Liberal)	G. Sutcliffe	707	15.0	−5.4
Majority		1,840	39.0	+2.5
Turnout		4,713		
Labour hold		Swing	+1.2	

Bradford Moor
Party	Candidate	Votes	%	±%
Labour	J. Lambert	3,311	62.8	+10.3
Conservative	G. Moore	1,085	20.6	−2.4
Alliance (SDP)	W. Whitley	872	16.5	−7.1
Majority		2,226	42.3	+13.4
Turnout		5,268		
Labour hold		Swing	+6.3	

Clayton
Party	Candidate	Votes	%	±%
Conservative	R. Farley	2,548	47.0	+4.0
Labour	G. Mitchell	2,153	39.7	+6.5
Alliance (SDP)	P. Garbutt	722	13.3	−10.5
Majority		395	7.3	−2.5
Turnout		5,423		
Conservative hold		Swing	-1.2	

Craven
Party	Candidate	Votes	%	±%
Conservative	A. Jerome	2,602	47.1	+7.1
Alliance (Liberal)	G. Funnell	1,839	33.3	−14.9
Labour	J. Fisk	1,083	19.6	+7.8
Majority		763	13.8	+5.6
Turnout		5,524		
Conservative hold		Swing	+11.0	

Eccleshill
Party	Candidate	Votes	%	±%
Labour	L. Crawforth	2,140	44.1	+8.3
Conservative	K. Sotomayor-Sugden	1,792	37.0	−3.8
Alliance (SDP)	J. Ryan	916	18.9	−4.6
Majority		348	7.2	+2.2
Turnout		4,848		
Labour hold		Swing	+6.0	

Great Horton
Party	Candidate	Votes	%	±%
Labour	J. Godward	2,606	49.2	+11.8
Conservative	E. Byrom	2,136	40.3	+1.7
Alliance (SDP)	J. Hargreaves	554	10.5	−13.5
Majority		470	8.9	+7.6
Turnout		5,296		
Labour hold		Swing	+5.0	

Heaton
Party	Candidate	Votes	%	±%
Conservative	R. Huggon	2,824	50.2	+3.1
Labour	M. Qureshi	1,582	28.1	+2.7
Alliance (SDP)	M. Pollard	1,217	21.6	−5.8
Majority		1,242	22.1	+2.3
Turnout		5,623		
Conservative hold		Swing	+0.2	

Idle
Party	Candidate	Votes	%	±%
Labour	K. Baxter	1,705	36.0	+12.1
Conservative	A. Garnett	1,523	32.2	+1.0
Alliance (Liberal)	D. Ward	1,503	31.8	−13.1
Majority		182	3.8	−9.9
Turnout		4,731		
Labour hold		Swing	+5.5	

Ilkley
Party	Candidate	Votes	%	±%
Conservative	J. Lightband	3,099	63.8	+2.9
Alliance (SDP)	V. Lister	1,238	25.5	−4.7
Labour	A. Corina	518	10.7	+1.7
Majority		1,861	38.3	+7.6
Turnout		4,855		
Conservative hold		Swing	+3.8	

Keighley North
Party	Candidate	Votes	%	±%
Conservative	A. Trigg	2,176	37.5	+2.7
Labour	F. Sunderland	2,077	35.8	+3.7
Alliance (Liberal)	D. Beaumont	1,549	26.7	−6.3
Majority		99	1.7	−0.1
Turnout		5,802		
Conservative hold		Swing	-0.5	

Keighley South
Party	Candidate	Votes	%	±%
Labour	G. Eccleston	2,796	61.5	+11.9
Conservative	T. Whitley	965	21.2	+5.6
Alliance (Liberal)	S. Green	786	17.3	−17.5
Majority		1,831	40.3	+25.4
Turnout		4,547		
Labour hold		Swing	+3.1	

Keighley West
Party	Candidate	Votes	%	±%
Labour	B. Thorne	2,828	50.9	+2.2
Conservative	M. Cowen	1,974	35.5	+4.6
Alliance (SDP)	J. Arnold	752	13.5	−6.8
Majority		854	15.4	−2.3
Turnout		5,554		
Labour hold		Swing	-1.2	

Little Horton
Party	Candidate	Votes	%	±%
Labour	A. Hameed	2,371	54.5	−1.0
Alliance (SDP)	J. McKenna	1,141	26.2	+1.3
Conservative	V. Holdsworth	841	19.3	−0.3
Majority		1,230	28.3	−2.2
Turnout		4,353		
Labour hold		Swing	-1.1	

Odsal
Party	Candidate	Votes	%	±%
Labour	B. Kearns	2,403	46.0	+6.3
Conservative	R. Warren	2,021	38.7	+1.4
Alliance (Liberal)	D. Rowley	796	15.2	−7.6
Majority		382	7.3	+4.9
Turnout		5,220		
Labour hold		Swing	+2.4	

Queensbury
Party	Candidate	Votes	%	±%
Conservative	J. Hirst	2,526	45.6	+5.9
Labour	J. Kerr	2,156	39.0	+3.6
Alliance (Liberal)	M. Farrar	853	15.4	−9.5
Majority		370	6.7	+2.3
Turnout		5,535		
Conservative hold		Swing	+1.1	

Rombalds
Party	Candidate	Votes	%	±%
Conservative	R. Wightman	3,204	58.1	+0.9
Alliance (Liberal)	C. Svensgaard	1,614	29.3	−4.5
Labour	J. Warwick	697	12.6	+3.5
Majority		1,590	28.8	+5.4
Turnout		5,515		
Conservative hold		Swing	+2.7	

Shipley East
Party	Candidate	Votes	%	±%
Labour	E. Saville	2,493	54.3	+1.6
Conservative	B. Larkin	1,341	29.2	+2.5
Alliance (Liberal)	I. Horner	758	16.5	−2.8
Majority		1,152	25.1	−0.9
Turnout		4,592		
Labour hold		Swing	-0.4	

Shipley West
Party	Candidate	Votes	%	±%
Conservative	J. Evans	3,266	55.4	+5.3
Labour	G. Carey	1,467	24.9	+1.9
Alliance (SDP)	K. Trobridge	988	16.7	−7.4
Ecology	S. Shepherd	178	3.0	+0.3
Majority		1,799	30.5	+4.7
Turnout		5,899		
Conservative hold		Swing	+1.7	

Thornton
Party	Candidate	Votes	%	±%
Conservative	E. Kinder	2,281	50.6	−1.2
Labour	F. Bastow	1,479	32.8	+4.3
Alliance (Liberal)	B. Payne	749	16.6	−3.1
Majority		802	17.8	−5.4
Turnout		4,509		
Conservative hold		Swing	-2.7	

Toller
Party	Candidate	Votes	%	±%
Conservative	E. Sunderland	2,238	41.4	+1.1
Labour	B. Swindells	2,179	40.3	+4.4
Alliance (SDP)	H. Rashid	983	18.2	−5.5
Majority		59	1.1	−3.2
Turnout		5,400		
Conservative hold		Swing	-1.6	

Tong
Party	Candidate	Votes	%	±%
Labour	T. Mahon	2,563	67.1	+15.5
Conservative	J. Sizer	793	20.8	−0.8
Alliance (SDP)	L. Robinson	462	12.1	−14.8
Majority		1,770	46.4	+21.6
Turnout		3,818		
Labour hold		Swing	+8.1	

Undercliffe
Party	Candidate	Votes	%	±%
Labour	J. Allinson	2,408	51.4	+4.8
Conservative	H. Ibbotson	1,612	34.4	−2.1
Alliance (SDP)	R. Jenkins	666	14.2	−2.7
Majority		796	17.0	+6.9
Turnout		4,686		
Labour hold		Swing	+3.4	

University
Party	Candidate	Votes	%	±%
Labour	T. Rooney	3,707	63.6	+30.0
Alliance (SDP)	S. Akbar	1,351	23.2	−19.2
Conservative	D. Baggley	693	11.9	−2.9
Communist	M. Ward	79	1.4	+1.4
Majority		2,356	40.4	+31.6
Turnout		5,830		
Labour hold		Swing	+24.6	

Wibsey
Party	Candidate	Votes	%	±%
Conservative	J. Butterfield	2,030	43.3	+3.0
Labour	R. Cannell	1,913	40.8	+8.9
Alliance (SDP)	C. Thain	749	16.0	−11.9
Majority		117	2.5	−6.0
Turnout		4,692		
Conservative gain from Labour		Swing	-2.9	

Worth Valley
Party	Candidate	Votes	%	±%
Conservative	Eric Pickles	2,530	56.4	+0.6
Labour	B. Leitch	1,302	29.0	+6.3
Alliance (Liberal)	R. Taylor	654	14.6	−6.9
Majority		1,228	27.4	−5.7
Turnout		4,486		
Conservative hold		Swing	-2.8	

Wyke
Party	Candidate	Votes	%	±%
Labour	C. Wardman	2,151	47.1	+5.4
Conservative	D. Owen	1,537	33.7	+1.9
Alliance (SDP)	C. Delaney	877	19.2	−7.3
Majority		614	13.4	+3.5
Turnout		4,565		
Labour hold		Swing	+1.7	
