= 1987 City of Bradford Metropolitan District Council election =

1987 UK local government election

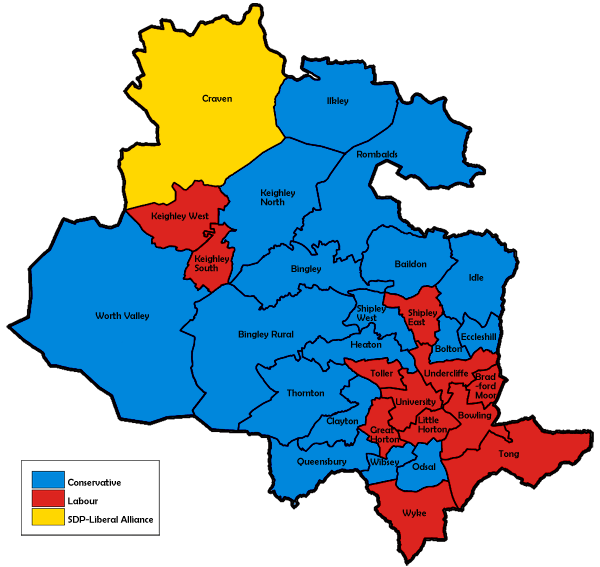
Map of the results for the 1987 Bradford council election.

The 1987 City of Bradford Metropolitan District Council elections were held on Thursday, 7 May 1987, with one third of the council and a vacancy in Bingley to be elected. Labour retained control of the council.

== Election result ==
Bradford local election result 1987
Party	Seats	Gains	Losses	Net gain/loss	Seats %	Votes %	Votes	+/−
Conservative	18	3	2	+1	58.1	40.4	64,445	+5.5
Labour	12	1	3	-2	38.7	35.2	56,065	-9.4
Alliance	1	1	0	+1	3.2	20.8	33,182	+0.9
Independent Ratepayer & Residents	0	0	0	0	0.0	3.2	5,107	+3.2
Green	0	0	0	0	0.0	0.3	475	+0.1
Communist	0	0	0	0	0.0	0.1	140	+0.1

This result had the following consequences for the total number of seats on the council after the elections:

Party	Previous council	New council
Labour	51	49
Conservatives	37	38
Alliance	2	3
Total	90	90
Working majority	12	8

== Ward results ==
Baildon
Party	Candidate	Votes	%	±%
Conservative	K. Poulton	3,010	44.0	−4.8
Alliance (Liberal)	S. Duckham	2,939	43.0	+12.6
Labour	S. Callaghan	777	11.4	−6.3
Green	C. Harris	112	1.6	−1.4
Majority		71	1.0	−17.4
Turnout		6,838		
Conservative hold		Swing	-8.7	

Bingley
Party	Candidate	Votes	%	±%
Conservative	T. Shaw	2,404	40.8	−3.7
Conservative	G. Seager	2,058		
Labour	M. Beeley	1,287	21.8	−13.8
Labour	J. Womersley	1,267		
Independent Ratepayers	R. Jackson	1,103	18.7	+18.7
Alliance (Liberal)	S. Whitehead	1,098	18.6	−1.2
Alliance (Liberal)	C. Mawhinney	841		
Majority		1,117	19.0	+10.1
Turnout		5,892		
Conservative hold		Swing		
Conservative hold		Swing	+5.0	

Bingley Rural
Party	Candidate	Votes	%	±%
Conservative	D. Conquest	2,762	47.6	−4.1
Independent Ratepayers	L. Reay	1,216	20.9	+20.9
Alliance (Liberal)	B. Parker	1,053	18.1	−5.4
Labour	M. Gregory	777	13.4	−11.4
Majority		1,546	26.6	−0.3
Turnout		5,808		
Conservative hold		Swing	-12.5	

Bolton
Party	Candidate	Votes	%	±%
Conservative	F. Lee	2,150	45.8	+12.2
Labour	E. English	1,514	32.2	−5.5
Alliance (SDP)	I. Glenn	1,031	22.0	−6.7
Majority		636	13.5	+9.4
Turnout		4,695		
Conservative hold		Swing	+8.8	

Bowling
Party	Candidate	Votes	%	±%
Labour	D. Coughlin	2,767	60.6	−8.1
Conservative	G. Moore	1,048	23.0	+7.3
Alliance (SDP)	G. Beacher	747	16.4	+0.8
Majority		1,719	37.7	−15.4
Turnout		4,562		
Labour hold		Swing	-7.7	

Bradford Moor
Party	Candidate	Votes	%	±%
Labour	B. Singh	2,712	56.4	−11.5
Conservative	H. Gill	1,257	26.1	+5.8
Alliance (SDP)	P. Cowling	837	17.4	+5.7
Majority		1,455	30.3	−17.3
Turnout		4,806		
Labour hold		Swing	-8.6	

Clayton
Party	Candidate	Votes	%	±%
Conservative	R. Farley	3,107	54.2	+14.6
Labour	P. Donohue	1,840	32.1	−13.7
Alliance (SDP)	J. Brennan	787	13.7	−0.9
Majority		1,267	22.1	+15.8
Turnout		5,734		
Conservative hold		Swing	+14.1	

Craven
Party	Candidate	Votes	%	±%
Alliance (Liberal)	J. Wells	2,687	44.0	+4.6
Conservative	W. Newby	2,611	42.8	+3.3
Labour	L. Whiteley	806	13.2	−7.8
Majority		76	1.2	+1.2
Turnout		6,104		
Alliance gain from Conservative		Swing	+0.6	

Eccleshill
Party	Candidate	Votes	%	±%
Conservative	P. Mitchell	1,871	41.6	+12.3
Labour	B. Hughes	1,736	38.6	−7.6
Alliance (Liberal)	J. Taylor	895	19.9	+1.4
Majority		135	3.0	−13.9
Turnout		4,502		
Conservative gain from Labour		Swing	+9.9	

Great Horton
Party	Candidate	Votes	%	±%
Labour	J. Godward	2,234	43.1	−10.1
Conservative	J. Beeson	2,192	42.3	+10.6
Alliance (SDP)	T. Figgess	754	14.6	−0.5
Majority		42	0.8	−20.7
Turnout		5,180		
Labour hold		Swing	-10.3	

Heaton
Party	Candidate	Votes	%	±%
Conservative	C. Hobson	2,709	44.3	+3.5
Labour	V. Fanning	2,162	35.3	−6.9
Alliance (SDP)	J. Hewitt	923	15.1	−1.3
Independent Ratepayers	R. Sample	325	5.3	+5.3
Majority		547	8.9	+7.5
Turnout		6,119		
Conservative hold		Swing	+5.2	

Idle
Party	Candidate	Votes	%	±%
Conservative	H. Lycett	1,689	33.3	+0.7
Alliance (Liberal)	I. Horner	1,585	31.2	−0.0
Labour	K. Baxter	1,534	30.2	−3.2
Independent Ratepayers	R. Reay	265	5.2	+5.2
Majority		104	2.0	+1.2
Turnout		5,073		
Conservative gain from Labour		Swing	+0.3	

Ilkley
Party	Candidate	Votes	%	±%
Conservative	B. Smith	3,302	53.7	+5.8
Alliance (Liberal)	S. Moorhouse	2,121	34.5	−4.2
Labour	R. Fox	720	11.7	−1.5
Majority		1,181	19.2	+10.0
Turnout		6,143		
Conservative hold		Swing	+5.0	

Keighley North
Party	Candidate	Votes	%	±%
Conservative	E. Owens	2,512	40.9	+0.6
Labour	J. Leitch	2,223	36.2	+2.5
Alliance (SDP)	R. Quayle	1,406	22.9	−3.1
Majority		289	4.7	−1.8
Turnout		6,141		
Conservative hold		Swing	-0.9	

Keighley South
Party	Candidate	Votes	%	±%
Labour	F. Sunderland	2,559	60.3	−10.2
Conservative	V. Earle	974	22.9	+6.7
Alliance (Liberal)	J. Brooksbank	711	16.7	+3.5
Majority		1,585	37.3	−17.0
Turnout		4,244		
Labour hold		Swing	-8.5	

Keighley West
Party	Candidate	Votes	%	±%
Labour	B. Thorne	2,473	45.0	−4.6
Conservative	N. Phillips	1,888	34.3	+3.5
Alliance (Liberal)	S. Green	820	14.9	−4.7
Residents	M. Jones	315	5.7	+5.7
Majority		585	10.6	−8.1
Turnout		5,496		
Labour hold		Swing	-4.0	

Little Horton
Party	Candidate	Votes	%	±%
Labour	A. Hameed	2,338	58.9	−13.8
Conservative	G. Johnson	856	21.6	+4.7
Alliance (SDP)	D. Jagger	774	19.5	+9.1
Majority		1,482	37.3	−18.5
Turnout		3,968		
Labour hold		Swing	-9.2	

Odsal
Party	Candidate	Votes	%	±%
Conservative	I. Whaites	2,504	44.8	+13.1
Labour	S. Khokhar	1,792	32.1	−19.2
Alliance (SDP)	D. Hopkins	1,293	23.1	+6.1
Majority		712	12.7	−6.8
Turnout		5,589		
Conservative gain from Labour		Swing	+16.1	

Queensbury
Party	Candidate	Votes	%	±%
Conservative	J. Hirst	2,429	41.7	+2.3
Labour	L. Woodward	1,841	31.6	−11.7
Alliance (SDP)	M. Dowson	839	14.4	−2.8
Independent Ratepayers	K. Craven	714	12.3	+12.3
Majority		588	10.1	+6.2
Turnout		5,823		
Conservative hold		Swing	+7.0	

Rombalds
Party	Candidate	Votes	%	±%
Conservative	R. Whiteman	3,545	54.7	+4.2
Alliance (SDP)	J. Ryan	1,966	30.4	−3.5
Labour	B. Wheeler	965	14.9	−0.6
Majority		1,579	24.4	+7.7
Turnout		6,476		
Conservative hold		Swing	+3.8	

Shipley East
Party	Candidate	Votes	%	±%
Labour	E. Saville	2,190	48.4	−13.0
Conservative	J. Duckworth	1,406	31.1	+9.6
Alliance (SDP)	M. Attenborough	929	20.5	+3.4
Majority		784	17.3	−22.6
Turnout		4,525		
Labour hold		Swing	-11.3	

Shipley West
Party	Candidate	Votes	%	±%
Conservative	J. Evans	2,758	44.3	+0.1
Labour	J. O'Neill	1,654	26.6	−7.7
Alliance (Liberal)	T. Willis	1,218	19.6	+0.5
Independent Ratepayers	G. Thompson	506	8.1	+8.1
Green	C. Ormondroyd	88	1.4	−1.0
Majority		1,104	17.7	+7.8
Turnout		6,224		
Conservative hold		Swing	+3.9	

Thornton
Party	Candidate	Votes	%	±%
Conservative	E. Kinder	2,368	47.6	−1.5
Labour	R. Redfern	1,684	33.8	−17.1
Alliance (SDP)	J. McKenna	587	11.8	+11.8
Independent Ratepayers	K. McGill	338	6.8	+6.8
Majority		684	13.7	+11.9
Turnout		4,977		
Conservative hold		Swing	+7.8	

Toller
Party	Candidate	Votes	%	±%
Labour	Y. Tough	2,665	48.9	−6.0
Conservative	V. Binney	1,906	35.0	+2.4
Alliance (SDP)	H. Heywood	551	10.1	−2.4
Independent Ratepayers	J. Sugden	325	6.0	+6.0
Majority		759	13.9	−8.4
Turnout		5,447		
Labour gain from Conservative		Swing	-4.2	

Tong
Party	Candidate	Votes	%	±%
Labour	T. Mahon	2,069	60.4	−6.9
Conservative	B. Thorne	782	22.8	+5.2
Alliance (SDP)	R. Dowson	576	16.8	+2.4
Majority		1,287	37.5	−12.0
Turnout		3,427		
Labour hold		Swing	-6.0	

Undercliffe
Party	Candidate	Votes	%	±%
Labour	A. Engel	2,277	49.0	−9.3
Conservative	R. Cope	1,614	34.8	+7.6
Alliance (SDP)	E. Hallmann	752	16.2	+1.6
Majority		663	14.3	−16.9
Turnout		4,643		
Labour hold		Swing	-8.4	

University
Party	Candidate	Votes	%	±%
Labour	T. Rooney	3,488	59.1	−18.0
Conservative	A. Skinner	2,001	33.9	+19.4
Green	D. Ford	275	4.7	+4.7
Communist	S. Simpson	140	2.4	+2.4
Majority		1,487	25.2	−37.4
Turnout		5,904		
Labour hold		Swing	-18.7	

Wibsey
Party	Candidate	Votes	%	±%
Conservative	J. Butterfield	2,250	44.6	+10.0
Labour	E. Hey	1,621	32.1	−13.2
Alliance (Liberal)	B. Boulton	1,178	23.3	+3.2
Majority		629	12.5	+1.7
Turnout		5,049		
Conservative hold		Swing	+11.6	

Worth Valley
Party	Candidate	Votes	%	±%
Conservative	Eric Pickles	2,842	56.1	+8.1
Labour	D. Grievson	1,305	25.8	−8.6
Alliance (SDP)	M. Malone	917	18.1	+0.4
Majority		1,537	30.3	+16.7
Turnout		5,064		
Conservative hold		Swing	+8.3	

Wyke
Party	Candidate	Votes	%	±%
Labour	C. Wardman	2,055	41.4	−13.1
Conservative	R. Buonvino	1,698	34.2	+8.3
Alliance (SDP)	R. Blagboro	1,208	24.3	+4.7
Majority		357	7.2	−21.4
Turnout		4,961		
Labour hold		Swing	-10.7	
