= 2000 City of Bradford Metropolitan District Council election =

2000 UK local government election

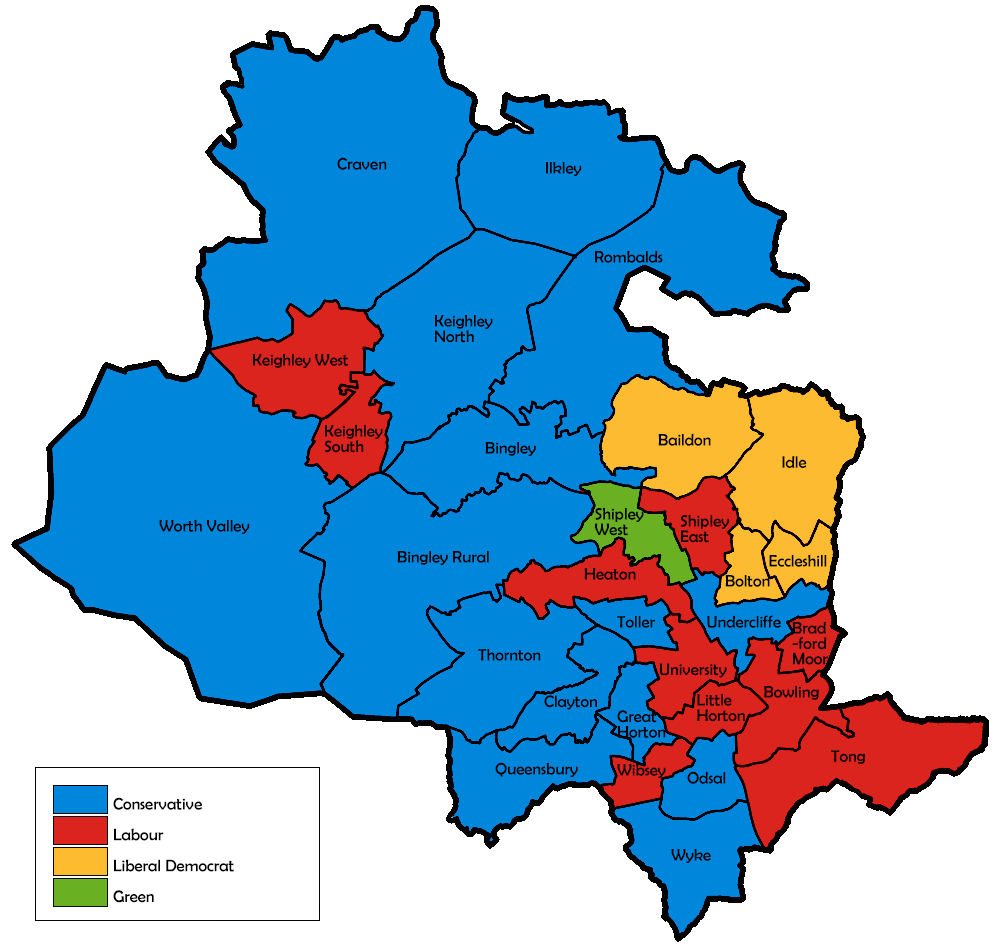
Map of the results for the 2000 Bradford council election.

The 2000 City of Bradford Metropolitan District Council elections were held on Thursday, 4 May 2000, with one third of the council up for election. Labour lost control of the council to no overall control.

== Election results ==
Bradford local election result 2000
Party	Seats	Gains	Losses	Net gain/loss	Seats %	Votes %	Votes	+/−
Conservative	15	11	0	▲11	50.0	43.7	45,422	+4.0
Labour	10	0	13	▼13	33.3	34.4	35,729	-3.9
Liberal Democrats	4	1	0	▲1	13.3	15.5	16,094	-1.3
Green	1	1	0	▲1	3.3	3.3	3,410	+0.7
Independent	0	0	0	Steady	0.0	2.9	2,980	+0.4
Asian League	0	0	0	Steady	0.0	0.2	195	+0.2
Socialist	0	0	0	Steady	0.0	0.1	97	+0.1

This result had the following consequences for the total number of seats on the council after the elections:

Party	Previous council	New council
Labour	54	41
Conservative	26	37
Liberal Democrat	10	11
Green	0	1
Total	90	90
Working majority	18	-8

== Ward results ==
Baildon
Party	Candidate	Votes	%	±%
Liberal Democrats	John Briggs	1,982	46.5	−8.4
Conservative	Edward Christopher Ward	1,699	39.9	+9.7
Labour	Carol Ann Jennings	484	11.4	−1.4
Green	Kevin Robert Warnes	95	2.2	+0.1
Majority		283	6.6	−18.1
Turnout		4,260	35.0	
Liberal Democrats hold		Swing	-9.0	

Bingley
Party	Candidate	Votes	%	±%
Conservative	David Heseltine	2,243	55.1	+5.0
Labour	Eileen Mary Sinclair	1,399	34.3	−3.4
Liberal Democrats	Rebecca Anne Walter	267	6.5	−1.5
Green	Muriel Winifred Thompson	165	4.0	−0.2
Majority		844	20.7	+8.4
Turnout		4,074	38.7	
Conservative gain from Labour		Swing	+4.2	

Bingley Rural
Party	Candidate	Votes	%	±%
Conservative	Phyllis Vera Pettit	2,479	65.9	+3.4
Labour	James Albert Newton	824	21.9	−3.9
Liberal Democrats	Timothy Iain Mead	322	8.5	−0.6
Green	Arthur Albert John Arnold	139	3.7	+1.1
Majority		1,655	44.0	+7.4
Turnout		3,764	31.7	
Conservative hold		Swing	+3.6	

Bolton
Party	Candidate	Votes	%	±%
Liberal Democrats	Howard Middleton	1,675	57.3	+3.4
Labour	Peter Cheney	628	21.5	−5.2
Conservative	Michael Thomas Looby	618	21.2	+1.9
Majority		1,047	35.8	+8.6
Turnout		2,921	28.3	
Liberal Democrats hold		Swing	+4.3	

Bowling
Party	Candidate	Votes	%	±%
Labour	John Ryan	1,391	52.4	−6.8
Conservative	John Cecil David Hardy	750	28.3	+9.1
Liberal Democrats	Julie Rosemary Harrington	317	11.9	−9.6
Asian League	Farhan Hussain Khokhar	195	7.4	+7.4
Majority		641	24.2	−13.6
Turnout		2,653	21.5	
Labour hold		Swing	-7.9	

Bradford Moor
Party	Candidate	Votes	%	±%
Labour	Ghazanfer Khaliq	1,827	56.1	+21.8
Conservative	Asad Mercury Malik	1,128	34.6	−22.8
Liberal Democrats	James E Mangeolles	302	9.3	+1.0
Majority		699	21.5	−1.7
Turnout		3,257	30.4	
Labour hold		Swing	+22.3	

Clayton
Party	Candidate	Votes	%	±%
Conservative	Charles Malcolm Sykes	1,561	53.4	+3.9
Labour	Gillian Margaret Whitfield	973	33.3	−3.4
Liberal Democrats	Edward John Hallmann	297	10.2	−1.0
Green	Alexander Suchi	92	3.1	+0.4
Majority		588	20.1	+7.3
Turnout		2,923	28.3	
Conservative gain from Labour		Swing	+3.6	

Craven
Party	Candidate	Votes	%	±%
Conservative	David Keith James Harrison	2,059	49.9	+6.4
Independent	Christopher Michael Atkinson	993	24.1	−0.4
Labour	Benita Eileen Smith	779	18.9	−1.7
Liberal Democrats	Hamish Gordon Hay	293	7.1	−4.4
Majority		1,066	25.8	+6.8
Turnout		4,124	33.0	
Conservative hold		Swing	+3.4	

Eccleshill
Party	Candidate	Votes	%	±%
Liberal Democrats	Alun Own Griffiths	1,002	38.1	+0.1
Labour	Susanne Rooney	851	32.3	−0.7
Conservative	James Ralph Ryder	780	29.6	+0.6
Majority		222	5.7	+0.7
Turnout		2,633	27.7	
Liberal Democrats gain from Labour		Swing	+0.4	

Great Horton
Party	Candidate	Votes	%	±%
Conservative	Moira Crabtree	1,358	43.0	+4.3
Labour	Geoffrey Green	1,294	41.0	−5.1
Liberal Democrats	Colin Wright	292	9.2	−1.9
Independent	Mohd Afzal	212	6.7	+6.7
Majority		64	2.0	−5.4
Turnout		3,156	28.2	
Conservative gain from Labour		Swing	+4.7	

Heaton
Party	Candidate	Votes	%	±%
Labour	Andrew Craig Pitts	2,046	47.6	+4.1
Conservative	John Antony Robertshaw	1,747	40.6	−2.2
Green	Helen Theyer Kemp	257	6.0	+6.0
Liberal Democrats	Hugh Alaric Tooby	248	5.8	−7.8
Majority		299	7.0	+6.3
Turnout		4,298	35.6	
Labour hold		Swing	+3.1	

Idle
Party	Candidate	Votes	%	±%
Liberal Democrats	David Ward	1,732	48.7	−8.4
Conservative	Philip Sweeney Kirkpatrick	1,068	30.1	+11.3
Labour	Gareth David Logan	753	21.2	−2.9
Majority		664	18.7	−14.3
Turnout		3,553	30.0	
Liberal Democrats hold		Swing	-9.8	

Ilkley
Party	Candidate	Votes	%	±%
Conservative	Colin George Powell	2,633	65.0	+5.4
Liberal Democrats	James Francis Keeley	758	18.7	+4.3
Labour	Talib Hussain	658	16.2	−9.6
Majority		1,875	46.3	+12.6
Turnout		4,049	36.7	
Conservative hold		Swing	+0.5	

Keighley North
Party	Candidate	Votes	%	±%
Conservative	Andrew Charles Mallinson	1,932	49.7	+13.5
Labour	Alexander James MacPherson	1,531	39.4	−15.4
Liberal Democrats	Judith Brooksbank	424	10.9	+1.9
Majority		401	10.3	−8.4
Turnout		3,887	35.1	
Conservative gain from Labour		Swing	+14.4	

Keighley South
Party	Candidate	Votes	%	±%
Labour	Stephen Thomas	1,363	58.2	−9.3
Conservative	Mark Francis Startin	690	29.5	+7.4
Liberal Democrats	Ian James Inness	289	12.3	+1.8
Majority		673	28.7	−16.7
Turnout		2,342	25.1	
Labour hold		Swing	-8.3	

Keighley West
Party	Candidate	Votes	%	±%
Labour	Andrew Geoffrey Mudd	1,583	41.7	−1.6
Conservative	Arshed Majeed	1,209	31.8	+0.2
Independent	Brian Hudson	677	17.8	+0.1
Liberal Democrats	Tracy Lorraine Keeley	328	8.6	+1.2
Majority		374	9.8	−1.8
Turnout		3,797	32.3	
Labour hold		Swing	-0.9	

Little Horton
Party	Candidate	Votes	%	±%
Labour	Sher Khan	1,474	50.5	−9.2
Conservative	Jamshed Khan	1,091	37.4	+10.5
Liberal Democrats	John Brian Massen	217	7.4	−2.1
Green	Brian Richard Ford	136	4.7	+2.4
Majority		383	13.1	−19.7
Turnout		2,918	26.7	
Labour hold		Swing	-9.8	

Odsal
Party	Candidate	Votes	%	±%
Conservative	Gordon Johnson	1,257	42.6	+8.9
Labour	James O'Neill	1,239	42.0	−9.6
Liberal Democrats	Brian James Boulton	451	15.3	+0.7
Majority		18	0.6	−17.2
Turnout		2,947	24.2	
Conservative gain from Labour		Swing	+9.2	

Queensbury
Party	Candidate	Votes	%	±%
Conservative	Michael Walls	1,802	54.6	+6.0
Labour	Gordon Winter	974	29.5	−8.3
Liberal Democrats	Susan Elizabeth Lambert	264	8.0	−2.3
Independent	George Frank Riseborough	162	4.9	+1.6
Green	Derek Curtis	98	3.0	+3.0
Majority		828	25.1	+14.3
Turnout		3,300	26.1	
Conservative gain from Labour		Swing	+7.1	

Rombalds
Party	Candidate	Votes	%	±%
Conservative	Dale Smith	2,799	61.8	+7.5
Labour	David Leslie Anderson	975	21.5	−2.4
Liberal Democrats	John Hall	757	16.7	−5.1
Majority		1,824	40.3	+9.8
Turnout		4,531	35.8	
Conservative hold		Swing	+4.9	

Shipley East
Party	Candidate	Votes	%	±%
Labour	Phillip Thornton	1,300	53.8	+0.8
Conservative	Michael Bryn Allcock	607	25.1	+3.8
Liberal Democrats	Michael Pollard	410	17.0	−3.9
Green	Martin John Love	101	4.2	−0.8
Majority		693	28.7	−3.0
Turnout		2,418	23.8	
Labour hold		Swing	-1.5	

Shipley West
Party	Candidate	Votes	%	±%
Green	David Michael Ford	1,859	37.0	+7.3
Conservative	David John Servant	1,256	32.6	−0.9
Labour	James Robert Flood	1,256	25.0	−5.8
Liberal Democrats	Ronald Craig	266	5.3	−0.6
Majority		220	4.4	+1.6
Turnout		5,020	43.4	
Green gain from Labour		Swing	+4.1	

Thornton
Party	Candidate	Votes	%	±%
Conservative	Valerie Binney	1,810	67.5	+9.9
Labour	Munir Ahmed	390	14.5	−14.2
Liberal Democrats	Helen Wright	370	13.8	+3.3
Green	Michael Anthony Rawnsley	112	4.2	+1.0
Majority		1,420	52.9	+24.1
Turnout		2,682	27.9	
Conservative gain from Labour		Swing	+12.0	

Toller
Party	Candidate	Votes	%	±%
Conservative	Arshad Hussain	2,639	47.5	+4.6
Labour	Imran Hussain	2,506	45.1	−3.6
Liberal Democrats	Christine Reid	416	7.5	−0.9
Majority		133	2.4	−3.4
Turnout		5,561	45.9	
Conservative gain from Labour		Swing	+4.1	

Tong
Party	Candidate	Votes	%	±%
Labour	James Anthony Cairns	800	50.8	−10.6
Conservative	John Arthur Stead	567	36.0	+12.4
Liberal Democrats	Adrian Hugh Cruden	207	13.1	−1.8
Majority		233	14.8	−23.0
Turnout		1,574	16.5	
Labour hold		Swing	-11.5	

Undercliffe
Party	Candidate	Votes	%	±%
Conservative	Intkhab Alam	1,203	40.5	+9.3
Labour	S. Barnbrook	927	31.2	−15.2
Liberal Democrats	Brian Moore	727	24.4	+8.0
Green	Steven Schofield	116	3.9	−2.0
Majority		276	9.3	−5.9
Turnout		2,973		
Conservative gain from Labour		Swing	+12.2	

University
Party	Candidate	Votes	%	±%
Labour	Sajawal Hussain	2,202	44.4	+3.8
Conservative	Tariq Mahmood	2,183	44.0	−2.9
Green	John Edward Robinson	240	4.8	−0.7
Liberal Democrats	Margaret Isobel Chadwick	237	4.8	−0.2
Socialist	Sajjad Hussain Shah	97	2.0	+2.0
Majority		19	0.4	−6.0
Turnout		4,959	31.3	
Labour hold		Swing	+3.3	

Wibsey
Party	Candidate	Votes	%	±%
Labour	Valerie McMath	1,378	49.0	−0.3
Conservative	Richard Ian Sheard	1,101	39.2	+2.1
Liberal Democrats	Shauna Ann Devonshire	332	11.8	−1.8
Majority		277	9.8	−2.5
Turnout		2,811	28.9	
Labour hold		Swing	-1.2	

Worth Valley
Party	Candidate	Votes	%	±%
Conservative	Paul Michael Barker	1,703	43.5	+6.2
Labour	John Cope	1,048	26.8	−1.1
Independent	David Samuels	936	23.9	+1.1
Liberal Democrats	Samuel E Harris	228	5.8	−6.2
Majority		655	16.7	+7.3
Turnout		3,915	33.7	
Conservative gain from Labour		Swing	-3.6	

Wyke
Party	Candidate	Votes	%	±%
Conservative	Robert Philip Andrew Reynolds	1,067	40.6	+1.6
Labour	Anthony Niland	876	33.3	−9.8
Liberal Democrats	Kevin Anthony Hall	684	26.0	+8.3
Majority		191	7.3	+3.2
Turnout		2,627	22.1	
Conservative gain from Labour		Swing	+5.7	

== By-elections between 2000 and 2002 ==
Bowling By-Election 22 March 2001
Party	Candidate	Votes	%	±%
Labour	Tony Niland	1,014	44.0	−8.4
Conservative	Zameer Shah	777	33.7	+5.4
Liberal Democrats	Rupert Oliver	473	20.5	+8.6
Majority		237	10.3	−13.9
Turnout		2,264	18.6	−2.9
Labour hold		Swing	-6.9	

Queensbury By-Election 7 June 2001
Party	Candidate	Votes	%	±%
Labour	Geoffrey Green	3,217	45.5	+16.0
Conservative		2,744	38.8	−15.8
Liberal Democrats		892	12.6	−4.6
Independent		203	2.9	−2.0
Asian League		13	0.2	+0.2
Majority		473	6.7	−18.4
Turnout		7,069	53.3	+27.2
Labour hold		Swing	+15.9	

Bingley Rural By-Election 6 December 2001
Party	Candidate	Votes	%	±%
Conservative	Juliette Kinsey	1,576	65.2	−0.7
Labour	James Newton	642	26.6	+4.7
Liberal Democrats	James Stewart	150	6.2	−2.4
Green	John Love	50	2.1	−1.9
Majority		934	38.6	−5.4
Turnout		2,418	20.0	−11.7
Conservative hold		Swing	-2.7	
