= 2002 City of Bradford Metropolitan District Council election =

2002 UK local government election

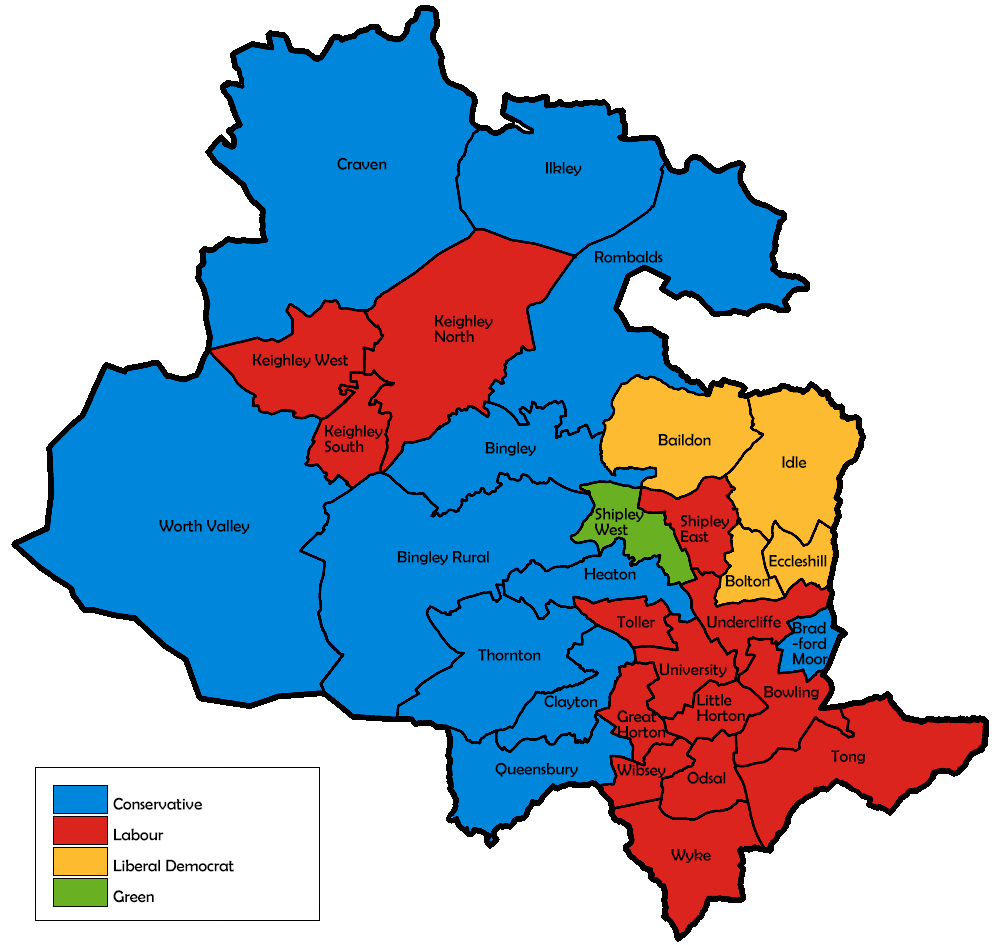
Map of the results for the 2002 Bradford council election.

Elections to City of Bradford Metropolitan District Council were held on 2 May 2002. One third of the council was up for election, and it remained under no overall control.

== Election result ==
Bradford local election result 2002
Party	Seats	Gains	Losses	Net gain/loss	Seats %	Votes %	Votes	+/−
Labour	14	1	4	▼3	46.7	38.4	46,788	+4.0%
Conservative	11	3	2	▲1	36.7	38.5	46,837	-5.2%
Liberal Democrats	4	1	0	▲1	13.3	16.6	20,178	+1.1%
Green	1	1	0	▲1	3.3	3.9	4,775	+0.6%
Independent	0	0	0	Steady	0.0	2.0	2,430	-0.9%
BNP	0	0	0	Steady	0.0	0.4	486	+0.4%
Socialist Alliance	0	0	0	Steady	0.0	0.2	257	+0.1%

This result had the following consequences for the total number of seats on the council after the elections:

Party	Previous council	New council
Labour	41	38
Conservative	37	38
Liberal Democrat	11	12
Green	1	2
Total	90	90
Working majority	-8	-14

== Ward results ==
Baildon
Party	Candidate	Votes	%	±%
Liberal Democrats	Alastair Thornton	2,399	48.6	+2.1
Conservative	Edward Ward	1,942	39.3	−0.5
Labour	Isa Khan	405	8.2	−3.2
Green	Kevin Warnes	192	3.9	+1.7
Majority		457	9.2	+2.6
Turnout		4,944	40.5	+5.5
Liberal Democrats hold		Swing	+1.3	

Bingley
Party	Candidate	Votes	%	±%
Conservative	Colin Gill	2,265	51.1	−3.9
Labour	Frank Needham	1,471	33.2	−1.1
Liberal Democrats	Alan Sykes	428	9.7	+3.1
Green	Arthur Arnold	264	6.0	+1.9
Majority		794	17.9	−2.8
Turnout		4,438	42.0	+3.3
Conservative hold		Swing	-1.4	

Bingley Rural
Party	Candidate	Votes	%	±%
Conservative	Margaret Eaton	2,733	62.9	−3.0
Labour	David Brown	1,032	23.7	+1.9
Liberal Democrats	Laura Cole	362	8.3	−0.2
Green	John Francis Love	218	5.0	+1.3
Majority		1,701	39.1	−4.8
Turnout		4,350	37.0	+5.3
Conservative hold		Swing	-2.4	

Bolton
Party	Candidate	Votes	%	±%
Liberal Democrats	Allan Hillary	2,317	62.7	+5.4
Labour	Jagtar Deol	770	20.8	−0.6
Conservative	John Robertshaw	606	16.4	−4.7
Majority		1,547	41.9	+6.1
Turnout		3,711	36.6	+8.3
Liberal Democrats hold		Swing	+3.0	

Bowling
Party	Candidate	Votes	%	±%
Labour	Anthony Niland	1,683	45.2	−7.2
Liberal Democrats	Rupert Oliver	1,163	31.2	+19.3
Conservative	Habib-Ur Rehman	876	23.5	−4.7
Majority		520	14.0	−10.2
Turnout		3,747	31.7	+10.2
Labour hold		Swing	-13.2	

Bradford Moor
Party	Candidate	Votes	%	±%
Conservative	Azhar Mahmood	2,159	46.6	+12.0
Labour	Susanne Rooney	1,952	42.1	−14.0
Liberal Democrats	Raihanna Ismail	522	11.3	+2.0
Majority		207	4.5	−17.0
Turnout		4,658	43.7	+13.3
Conservative gain from Labour		Swing	+13.0	

Clayton
Party	Candidate	Votes	%	±%
Conservative	David John Servant	1,454	44.1	−9.3
Labour	Olayemi Fagborun	1,192	36.1	+2.9
Liberal Democrats	Lorna Leeming	513	15.6	+5.4
Green	Alexander Suchi	138	4.2	+1.0
Majority		262	7.9	−12.2
Turnout		3,304	32.4	+4.1
Conservative gain from Labour		Swing	-6.1	

Craven
Party	Candidate	Votes	%	±%
Conservative	Eric Dawson	2,358	54.9	+4.9
Labour	Francis Harrison	1,364	31.7	+12.8
Liberal Democrats	Ambrose Micklem	576	13.4	+6.3
Majority		994	23.1	−2.7
Turnout		4,304	34.5	+1.5
Conservative hold		Swing	-3.9	

Eccleshill
Party	Candidate	Votes	%	±%
Liberal Democrats	Dorothy Ann Wallace	1,087	32.9	−5.2
Labour	Gareth Logan	1,045	31.6	−0.7
Conservative	Richard Sheard	598	18.1	−11.5
BNP	Arthur Bentley	486	14.7	+14.7
Independent	Audrey Raistrick	90	2.7	+2.7
Majority		42	1.3	−4.5
Turnout		3,310	35.9	+8.2
Liberal Democrats gain from Labour		Swing	-2.2	

Great Horton
Party	Candidate	Votes	%	±%
Labour	Paul Flowers	2,051	55.5	+14.5
Conservative	Jonathan Stubbs	1,125	30.4	−12.6
Liberal Democrats	James Mangeolles	310	8.4	−0.9
Green	Derek Curtis	209	5.7	+5.7
Majority		926	25.1	+23.0
Turnout		3,698	34.0	+5.8
Labour hold		Swing	+13.5	

Heaton
Party	Candidate	Votes	%	±%
Conservative	John Stanley King	2,380	46.7	+6.0
Labour	Imran Ahmed Khan	2,032	39.9	−7.7
Liberal Democrats	Helen Wright	346	6.8	+1.0
Green	Helen Kemp	271	5.3	−0.7
Socialist Alliance	Howard Miles	68	1.3	+1.3
Majority		348	6.8	−0.1
Turnout		5,104	43.0	+7.4
Conservative hold		Swing	+6.8	

Idle
Party	Candidate	Votes	%	±%
Liberal Democrats	Jeanette Sunderland	2,192	50.3	+1.5
Conservative	Philip Kirkpatrick	1,228	28.2	−1.9
Labour	Mark Fieldhouse	941	21.6	+0.4
Majority		964	22.1	+3.4
Turnout		4,377	35.6	+5.6
Liberal Democrats hold		Swing	+1.7	

Ilkley
Party	Candidate	Votes	%	±%
Conservative	Anne Hawkesworth	3,048	64.2	−0.8
Labour	Paul Dutton	1,109	23.4	+7.1
Liberal Democrats	Carsten Svensgaard	587	12.4	−6.3
Majority		1,939	40.9	−5.4
Turnout		4,478	43.0	+6.3
Conservative hold		Swing	-3.9	

Keighley North
Party	Candidate	Votes	%	±%
Labour	Maxine Hepworth	1,933	47.8	+8.4
Conservative	Mark Startin	1,661	41.1	−8.6
Liberal Democrats	James Main	450	11.1	+0.2
Majority		272	6.7	−3.6
Turnout		4,059	37.1	+2.0
Labour hold		Swing	+8.5	

Keighley South
Party	Candidate	Votes	%	±%
Labour	John Prestage	1,640	62.4	+4.2
Conservative	David McKay	696	26.5	−3.0
Liberal Democrats	Edward Hallmann	292	11.1	−1.2
Majority		944	35.9	+7.2
Turnout		2,653	29.8	+4.7
Labour hold		Swing	+3.6	

Keighley West
Party	Candidate	Votes	%	±%
Labour	Irene Ellison-Wood	1,715	44.7	+3.1
Conservative	Nancy Holdsworth	1,194	31.2	−0.7
Independent	Brian Hudson	541	14.1	−3.7
Liberal Democrats	Cristopher Campbell Brown	382	10.0	+1.3
Majority		521	13.6	+3.8
Turnout		3,845	34.1	+1.8
Labour hold		Swing	+1.9	

Little Horton
Party	Candidate	Votes	%	±%
Labour	Taj Mubarik Salam	1,903	50.9	+0.4
Conservative	Jamshed Khan	1,297	34.7	−2.7
Liberal Democrats	John Massen	273	7.3	−0.1
Green	Brian Ford	167	4.5	−0.2
Socialist Alliance	Ann Morgan	96	2.6	+2.6
Majority		606	16.2	+3.1
Turnout		3,745	36.8	+10.1
Labour hold		Swing	+1.5	

Odsal
Party	Candidate	Votes	%	±%
Labour	James O'Neill	1,921	51.0	+9.0
Conservative	Michael Ellis	1,170	31.1	−11.6
Liberal Democrats	Brian Boulton	579	15.4	+0.1
Socialist Alliance	Ateeq Siddique	93	2.5	+2.5
Majority		751	20.0	+19.4
Turnout		3,776	32.0	+7.8
Labour hold		Swing	+10.3	

Queensbury
Party	Candidate	Votes	%	±%
Conservative	Stuart Hanson	1,706	43.0	−11.6
Labour	Geoffrey Green	1,606	40.5	+11.0
Liberal Democrats	John Robert Saul	420	10.6	+2.6
Green	Eileen Allen	235	5.9	+2.9
Majority		100	2.5	−22.6
Turnout		3,975	30.1	+4.0
Conservative gain from Labour		Swing	-11.3	

Rombalds
Party	Candidate	Votes	%	±%
Conservative	Christopher Greaves	2,892	56.8	−5.0
Labour	Graham Hill	1,258	24.7	+3.2
Liberal Democrats	John Hall	942	18.5	+1.8
Majority		1,634	32.1	−8.2
Turnout		5,103	40.2	+4.4
Conservative hold		Swing	-4.1	

Shipley East
Party	Candidate	Votes	%	±%
Labour	Tony Miller	1,443	50.9	−2.8
Conservative	Derek Taylor	680	24.0	−1.1
Liberal Democrats	Ronald Craig	519	18.3	+1.4
Green	Christina Love	192	6.8	+2.6
Majority		763	26.9	−1.7
Turnout		2,843	29.4	+5.6
Labour hold		Swing	-0.8	

Shipley West
Party	Candidate	Votes	%	±%
Green	Martin Love	2,252	42.0	+5.0
Conservative	John Anthony Carroll	1,609	30.0	−2.6
Labour	Vanda Greenwood	405	22.5	−2.6
Liberal Democrats	Francis Dale	292	5.4	+0.1
Majority		643	12.0	+7.6
Turnout		5,362	47.1	+3.7
Green gain from Conservative		Swing	+3.8	

Thornton
Party	Candidate	Votes	%	±%
Conservative	Clive Richardson	1,428	43.1	−24.4
Independent	Melanie Milnes	917	27.7	+27.7
Labour	Gordon Winter	666	20.1	+5.6
Liberal Democrats	David Weston	188	5.7	−8.1
Green	Michael Anthony Rawnsley	114	3.4	−0.7
Majority		511	15.4	−37.5
Turnout		3,314	34.9	+7.0
Conservative hold		Swing	-26.0	

Toller
Party	Candidate	Votes	%	±%
Labour	Imran Hussain (British Politician)	3,416	57.9	+12.8
Conservative	Amjad Hussain	2,143	36.3	−11.2
Liberal Democrats	Naveed Ilyas	345	5.8	−1.6
Majority		1,273	21.6	+19.2
Turnout		5,950	49.2	+3.3
Labour gain from Conservative		Swing	+12.0	

Tong
Party	Candidate	Votes	%	±%
Labour	John Ruding	1,424	62.8	+12.0
Conservative	J. Stead	591	26.1	−10.0
Liberal Democrats	S. Lambert	253	11.2	−2.0
Majority		833	36.7	+21.9
Turnout		2,268	24.3	+7.8
Labour hold		Swing	+11.0	

Undercliffe
Party	Candidate	Votes	%	±%
Labour	Robert Sowman	1,467	42.1	+11.0
Conservative	Mohammad Masood	1,072	30.8	−9.7
Liberal Democrats	Brian Moore	476	21.4	−3.0
Green	Steven Schofield	196	5.6	+1.7
Majority		395	11.3	+2.1
Turnout		3,502	34.9	
Labour hold		Swing	+10.3	

University
Party	Candidate	Votes	%	±%
Labour	Choudhary Rangzeb	3,431	55.6	+11.2
Conservative	Khadim Hussain	2,121	34.4	−9.7
Green	John Edward Robinson	327	5.3	+0.5
Liberal Democrats	Margaret Chadwick	293	4.7	−0.0
Majority		1,310	21.2	+20.8
Turnout		6,194	43.9	+12.6
Labour hold		Swing	+10.4	

Wibsey
Party	Candidate	Votes	%	±%
Labour	Keith Thomson	1,987	59.9	+10.9
Conservative	Dorothy Craven	951	28.7	−10.5
Liberal Democrats	Beverley Beaumont	380	11.41	−0.4
Majority		1,036	31.2	+21.4
Turnout		3,330	33.7	+4.8
Labour hold		Swing	+10.7	

Worth Valley
Party	Candidate	Votes	%	±%
Conservative	Kristan Hopkins	1,810	41.8	−1.7
Labour	Mark Curtis	1,273	29.4	+2.6
Independent	David Samuels	882	20.3	−3.6
Liberal Democrats	Richard Quayle	369	8.5	+2.7
Majority		537	12.4	−4.3
Turnout		4,349	36.5	+2.8
Conservative hold		Swing	-2.1	

Wyke
Party	Candidate	Votes	%	±%
Labour	Mark Cummins	1,455	46.2	+12.8
Conservative	John David Hardy	1,044	33.1	−7.5
Liberal Democrats	Kevin Hall	405	20.7	−5.3
Majority		411	13.0	+5.8
Turnout		3,163	27.4	+5.3
Labour hold		Swing	+10.1	
