= Rombalds Moor =

Area of moorland in West Yorkshire, England

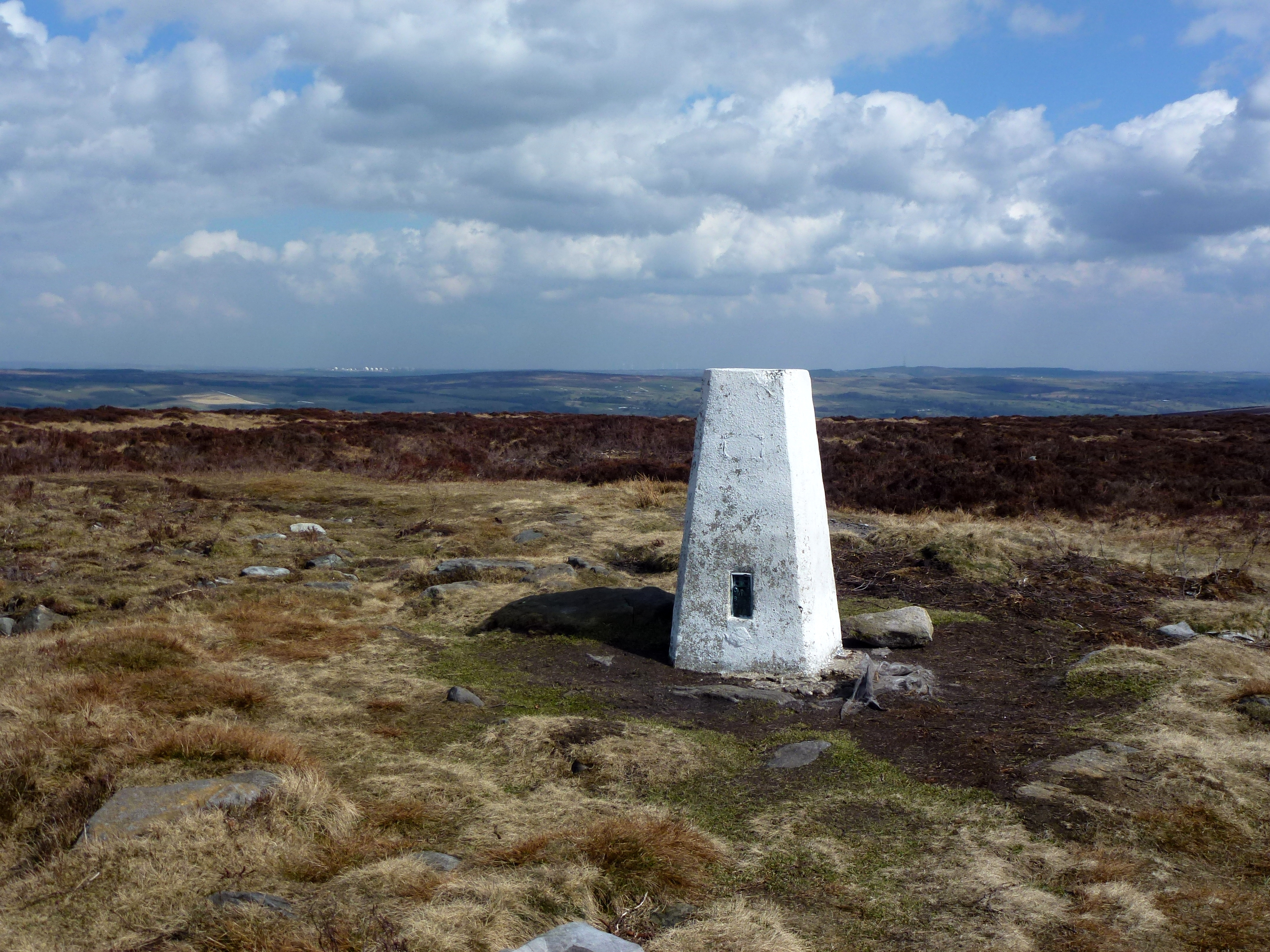

Highest point
- Elevation: 402 m (1,319 ft)
- Prominence: c. 244 metres (801 ft)
- Parent peak: Thorpe Fell Top
- Listing: Marilyn

Geography
- Location: West Yorkshire, United Kingdom
- OS grid: SE114452
- Topo map: OS Landranger 104

Rombalds Moor is an area of moorland in West Yorkshire, England, between the Airedale and Wharfedale valleys. The towns of Ilkley and Keighley lie to its northern and southern edges, respectively. The moor is sometimes referred to as Ilkley Moor, though technically this refers to the section of moor on the northern flank, above the town of Ilkley.

== Geography ==
Rombalds Moor consists of several moors, usually named after the nearest town or village bordering it. They include (clockwise from north): Ilkley Moor, Burley Moor, Hawksworth Moor, Baildon Moor, Bingley Moor, Morton Moor, and Addingham High Moor.

There are over 400 examples of stones with cup and ring marks on them scattered across Rombalds Moor.

== Etymology ==
The moor is said to be named after the local folklore legend of Rombald the Giant. The story goes that Rombald lived on the moor with his wife and one day during an argument, she was chasing him across the valley when he stamped on a huge rock, smashing it in two, which separated the famous Cow and Calf. Rombald's wife then dropped the rocks she was holding in her skirt, which created the Great and Little Skirtful of Stones formations. An alternative story is that Rombald was prone to fits of rage; he would cause thunder to rumble across the valley and hurl huge rocks across the moor, which is another origin story for the iconic Cow and Calf Rocks.

The name Rombald, however, is more likely to be a corruption of Romille, the moors surrounding Skipton having been given to Robert de Romille by William the Conqueror. Older Ordnance Survey maps show an earlier variant of the name as Rumbles Moor.
