= 2015 City of Bradford Metropolitan District Council election =

The 2015 City of Bradford Metropolitan District Council election took place on 7 May 2015. This was on the same day as other local elections and a general election. One councillor was elected in each ward for a four-year term so the councillors elected in 2015 last stood for election in 2011. Each ward is represented by three councillors, the election of which is staggered, so only one third of the councillors were elected in this election. Labour retained overall control of the council.

Map of the results of the 2015 Bradford council election. Labour in red, Conservatives in blue, Liberal Democrats in yellow and Greens in green.

== Election result ==
Of the Council's 90 seats, 30 were up for election.

Bradford Metropolitan Borough Council election, 2015
| Party | Candidates | | | | | | Votes | | |
| Party | Stood | Elected | Gained | Unseated | Net | % of total | % | No. | Net % |
|---|---|---|---|---|---|---|---|---|---|
| Labour | 30 | 17 | +2 | -2 | Steady | 56.7% | 38.1% | 84,391 | ▼6.5% |
| Conservative | 30 | 9 | +2 | 0 | ▲2 | 30.0% | 27.7% | 61,377 | ▼4.3% |
| Liberal Democrats | 30 | 3 | +1 | 0 | ▲1 | 10.0% | 9.2% | 20,267 | ▼3.8% |
| Green | 30 | 1 | 0 | 0 | Steady | 3.3% | 6.1% | 13,506 | ▼0.5% |
| UKIP | 26 | 0 | 0 | -1 | ▼1 | 0.0% | 12.1% | 26,707 | ▲11.3% |
| Respect | 7 | 0 | 0 | 0 | 0 | 0.0% | 2.7% | 6,055 | ▲2.7% |
| Independent | 5 | 0 | 0 | -2 | ▼2 | 0.0% | 2.7% | 5,877 | ▲2.7% |
| TUSC | 5 | 0 | 0 | 0 | Steady | 0.0% | 0.2% | 334 | ▲0.2% |
| British Democrats | 1 | 0 | 0 | 0 | Steady | 0.0% | 0.0% | 38 | ▼1.1% |

| Party | Previous council | New council |
|---|---|---|
| Labour | 46 | 46 |
| Conservative | 21 | 23 |
| Liberal Democrats | 8 | 9 |
| Independent | 10 | 8 |
| Green | 3 | 3 |
| UKIP | 2 | 1 |
| Total | 90 | 90 |
| Working majority | 2 | 2 |

== Ward results ==
The electoral division results listed below are based on the changes from the last time this third was up for election, in the 2011 elections, not taking into account any mid-term by-elections or party defections.

An asterisk denotes an incumbent.

=== Baildon ward ===
Baildon
| Party | Candidate | Votes | % | ±% |
|---|---|---|---|---|
| Conservative | Mike Pollard | 4,314 | 50.5 | −1.9 |
| Labour | Joe Ashton | 2,079 | 24.3 | +3.3 |
| Liberal Democrats | Barney Lerner | 967 | 11.3 | −6.7 |
| UKIP | Alec Suchi | 683 | 8.0 | +8.0 |
| Green | Robert Minter Nicholls | 474 | 5.5 | −2.6 |
| Majority | | 2,235 | 26.16 | −5.2 |
| Turnout | | 8,544 | 72.4 | +25.3 |
| Conservative hold | | Swing | -2.6 | |

The incumbent was Rodger L'Amie who retired at the 2015 election.

=== Bingley ward ===
Bingley
| Party | Candidate | Votes | % | ±% |
|---|---|---|---|---|
| Conservative | Mark Christopher John Shaw* | 4,914 | 47.9 | −4.8 |
| Labour | Joseph Henry Wheatley | 2,572 | 25.1 | −6.6 |
| UKIP | Lynne Hannam Edgley | 1,448 | 14.1 | +14.1 |
| Green | John Stephen Martin | 855 | 8.3 | −1.7 |
| Liberal Democrats | Robert Baxter Higgie | 430 | 4.2 | −0.7 |
| Majority | | 2,342 | 22.8 | +1.8 |
| Turnout | | 10,253 | 72.9 | +26.7 |
| Conservative hold | | Swing | +0.9 | |

=== Bingley Rural ward ===
Bingley Rural
| Party | Candidate | Votes | % | ±% |
|---|---|---|---|---|
| Conservative | Simon Cooke* | 5,050 | 51.4 | −6.9 |
| Labour | Andrew David McCormick | 2,161 | 22.0 | −3.9 |
| UKIP | Stephen Henry | 1,572 | 16.0 | +16.0 |
| Green | Brian Newham | 566 | 5.8 | −1.8 |
| Liberal Democrats | Kay Kirkham | 438 | 4.5 | −3.1 |
| Majority | | 2,889 | 29.4 | −3.0 |
| Turnout | | 9,817 | 70.7 | +27.6 |
| Conservative hold | | Swing | -8.9 | |

=== Bolton & Undercliffe ward ===
Bolton and Undercliffe
| Party | Candidate | Votes | % | ±% |
|---|---|---|---|---|
| Liberal Democrats | Michael Andrew Stelling | 2,457 | 36.8 | −9.8 |
| Labour | Omar Hussain | 2,164 | 32.4 | −6.8 |
| UKIP | Lincoln Stead | 1,075 | 16.1 | +16.1 |
| Conservative | Wajid Jahangir | 708 | 10.6 | −2.1 |
| Green | Alex Newsham | 251 | 3.8 | +3.8 |
| Majority | | 293 | 4.4 | −3.0 |
| Turnout | | 6675 | 60.6 | +25.3 |
| Liberal Democrats hold | | Swing | -1.5 | |

The incumbent was Howard Middleton who stood down at the 2015 election.

=== Bowling & Barkerend ward ===
Bowling and Barkerend
| Party | Candidate | Votes | % | ±% |
|---|---|---|---|---|
| Labour | Imran Ahmed Khan* | 3,446 | 50.2 | +7.0 |
| Conservative | Mohammed Jamil | 1,380 | 20.1 | −10.8 |
| Liberal Democrats | Susan Anne Elliott | 942 | 13.7 | −11.1 |
| UKIP | Brian Gilbert Jones | 792 | 11.5 | +11.5 |
| Green | Dale Patrick Deacon | 201 | 2.9 | +2.9 |
| TUSC | Ian Slattery | 63 | 0.9 | +0.9 |
| Majority | | 2,066 | 30.1 | +17.8 |
| Turnout | | 6,869 | 61.3 | +21.3 |
| Labour hold | | Swing | +8.9 | |

=== Bradford Moor ward ===
Bradford Moor
| Party | Candidate | Votes | % | ±% |
|---|---|---|---|---|
| Labour | Zafar Iqbal | 3,956 | 52.2 | −13.7 |
| Liberal Democrats | Riaz Ahmed | 2,864 | 37.8 | +9.8 |
| Conservative | Sakhawat Hussain | 378 | 5.0 | −0.1 |
| UKIP | Wanda Andre | 198 | 2.6 | +2.6 |
| Green | Bob Cannell | 132 | 1.7 | +1.7 |
| Majority | | 1,092 | 14.4 | −23.5 |
| Turnout | | 7,579 | 66.3 | +29.1 |
| Labour hold | | Swing | -11.8 | |

The incumbent was Ghazanfer Khaliq who stood down at the 2015 election.

=== City ward ===
City
| Party | Candidate | Votes | % | ±% |
|---|---|---|---|---|
| Labour | Shakeela Jan Lal* | 4,031 | 68.2 | +4.7 |
| Respect | Shariq Mahmood | 903 | 15.3 | +15.3 |
| Green | Philip Somerville | 320 | 5.4 | +0.4 |
| Conservative | Shakeel Hussain | 266 | 4.5 | −22.9 |
| UKIP | Sarah Louise Deighton | 196 | 3.3 | +3.3 |
| Liberal Democrats | Tariq Mahmood | 97 | 1.6 | −1.6 |
| TUSC | Dawid Blahuszewski | 68 | 1.2 | +1.2 |
| Majority | | 3,128 | 52.9 | +16.9 |
| Turnout | | 5,912 | 54.4 | +12.9 |
| Labour hold | | Swing | -5.3 | |

The swing is expressed between Labour & Respect.

=== Clayton & Fairweather Green ward ===
Clayton & Fairweather Green
| Party | Candidate | Votes | % | ±% |
|---|---|---|---|---|
| Labour Co-op | Carol Ann Thirkill* | 3,158 | 47.5 | −7.7 |
| Conservative | Peter Andrew Robert Mills | 1,509 | 22.7 | −7.4 |
| UKIP | James David Vasey | 1,156 | 17.4 | +17.4 |
| Respect | Adrian Longthorn | 376 | 5.7 | +5.7 |
| Liberal Democrats | Steven Michael Cotterill | 218 | 3.3 | −3.0 |
| Green | Norma Russell | 213 | 3.2 | −4.6 |
| Majority | | 1,649 | 24.8 | −0.3 |
| Turnout | | 6,654 | 61.9 | +26.1 |
| Labour hold | | Swing | +0.2 | |

=== Craven ward ===
Craven
| Party | Candidate | Votes | % | ±% |
|---|---|---|---|---|
| Conservative | Jack Rickard | 3,906 | 40.6 | −15.5 |
| Independent | Christopher Atkinson* | 2,430 | 25.3 | +25.3 |
| Labour | Val Carroll | 2,223 | 23.1 | −4.3 |
| Green | Janet Souyave | 560 | 5.8 | −1.6 |
| Liberal Democrats | Stuart Ebden | 440 | 4.6 | −3.8 |
| Majority | | 1,683 | 17.5 | −11.1 |
| Turnout | | 9,617 | 74.2 | +29.7 |
| Conservative gain from Independent | | Swing | | |

=== Eccleshill ward ===
Eccleshill
| Party | Candidate | Votes | % | ±% |
|---|---|---|---|---|
| Liberal Democrats | Nicola Pollard | 2,137 | 31.8 | −4.8 |
| Labour | Gill Thornton | 2,003 | 29.8 | −12.9 |
| UKIP | GST | 1,437 | 21.4 | +21.4 |
| Conservative | Terry Pearson | 911 | 13.6 | −6.3 |
| Green | Vanessa Louise Pilny | 200 | 3.0 | +3.0 |
| Majority | | 134 | 2.0 | −4.1 |
| Turnout | | 6,712 | 59.3 | +26.6 |
| Liberal Democrats gain from Labour | | Swing | +4.0 | |

The incumbent was Ruth Billheimer who retired at this election.

=== Great Horton ward ===
Great Horton
| Party | Candidate | Votes | % | ±% |
|---|---|---|---|---|
| Labour | Tariq Hussain | 4,098 | 64.4 | −10.2 |
| Conservative | Hashim Mohammad Kohan | 802 | 12.6 | −2.6 |
| UKIP | Owais Rajput | 760 | 11.9 | +11.9 |
| Liberal Democrats | Mary Slingsby | 358 | 5.6 | −3.5 |
| Green | Jonathan David Thurling | 209 | 3.3 | +3.3 |
| TUSC | Jason Daniel Smith | 72 | 1.1 | +1.1 |
| Majority | | 3,296 | 51.8 | −7.5 |
| Turnout | | 6,360 | 61.3 | +24.7 |
| Labour hold | | Swing | -3.8 | |

The incumbent was John Derek Godward who stood down at this election.

=== Heaton ward ===
Heaton
| Party | Candidate | Votes | % | ±% |
|---|---|---|---|---|
| Labour | Mohammed Amran | 3,549 | 50.0 | +1.9 |
| Green | David Michael Ford | 1,114 | 15.7 | −5.6 |
| Conservative | Abdul Qayyum | 928 | 13.1 | −13.1 |
| Respect | Halima Afza | 917 | 12.9 | +12.9 |
| UKIP | Jonathan Daniel Stewart Barras | 392 | 5.5 | +5.5 |
| Liberal Democrats | Mike McNally | 156 | 2.2 | −1.7 |
| Majority | | 2,435 | 34.3 | +12.4 |
| Turnout | | 7,091 | 66.0 | +17.9 |
| Labour hold | | Swing | +7.5 | |

The incumbent was Rizwan Malik who stood down at this election. The swing is expressed between Labour & the Conservatives which were second in 2011.

=== Idle & Thackley ward ===
Idle and Thackley
| Party | Candidate | Votes | % | ±% |
|---|---|---|---|---|
| Liberal Democrats | Jeanette Sunderland* | 3,922 | 49.0 | +2.2 |
| Labour | Graeme Atkins | 1,536 | 19.2 | −2.4 |
| UKIP | Garry Blackmore | 1,189 | 14.9 | +14.9 |
| Conservative | Falak Naz Ahmed | 1,049 | 13.1 | −6.0 |
| Green | Andy Stanford | 280 | 3.5 | −5.5 |
| Majority | | 2,386 | 29.8 | +2.1 |
| Turnout | | 8,003 | 66.5 | +28.2 |
| Liberal Democrats hold | | Swing | +2.3 | |

There were two candidates elected in the 2011 election and the Liberal Democrats, Labour & Conservatives fielded two candidates each. So the percentage changes & swing for this ward are calculated compared to an average of the votes for the two candidates that represented the corresponding party in 2011.

=== Ilkley ward ===
Ilkley
| Party | Candidate | Votes | % | ±% |
|---|---|---|---|---|
| Conservative | Martin Smith* | 4,402 | 47.5 | −5.5 |
| Labour | Ann Cryer | 3,146 | 33.9 | +6.6 |
| UKIP | Paul John Latham | 607 | 6.5 | +0.6 |
| Green | Brian Richard Ford | 575 | 6.2 | +6.2 |
| Liberal Democrats | Michael Robert Thomas Powell | 501 | 5.4 | −7.7 |
| Majority | | 1,256 | 13.5 | −12.1 |
| Turnout | | 9,272 | 78.6 | +25.7 |
| Conservative hold | | Swing | -6.1 | |

=== Keighley Central ward ===
Keighley Central
| Party | Candidate | Votes | % | ±% |
|---|---|---|---|---|
| Conservative | Zafar Ali | 3,242 | 42.0 | +0.5 |
| Labour | Kaneez Akthar* | 2,912 | 37.7 | −5.1 |
| UKIP | Ian Ross Dermondy | 754 | 9.8 | +9.8 |
| Liberal Democrats | Gerald Richard Brooksbank | 370 | 4.8 | −4.2 |
| Green | Daisy May Knight | 303 | 3.9 | −1.3 |
| Majority | | 330 | 4.3 | +3.0 |
| Turnout | | 7,716 | 69.0 | +17.6 |
| Conservative gain from Labour | | Swing | +2.8 | |

=== Keighley East ward ===
Keighley East
| Party | Candidate | Votes | % | ±% |
|---|---|---|---|---|
| Labour | Doreen Lee* | 3,348 | 40.7 | −8.7 |
| Conservative | Mark Francis Startin | 2,611 | 31.8 | −4.1 |
| UKIP | John Stevens Kirby | 1,398 | 17.0 | +17.0 |
| Green | James Jonathan Whitaker | 379 | 4.6 | −0.5 |
| Liberal Democrats | Tom Hebbert | 258 | 3.1 | −5.6 |
| Respect | Khalid Mahmood | 188 | 2.3 | +2.3 |
| Majority | | 737 | 9.0 | −4.6 |
| Turnout | | 8,218 | 69.9 | +27.2 |
| Labour hold | | Swing | +2.3 | |

=== Keighley West ===
Keighley West
| Party | Candidate | Votes | % | ±% |
|---|---|---|---|---|
| Labour | Cath Bacon | 2,552 | 37.1 | −12.6 |
| Conservative | Christopher John Herd | 2,329 | 33.9 | −9.2 |
| UKIP | George Michael Firth | 1,540 | 22.4 | +22.4 |
| Green | Nick Farrar | 251 | 3.7 | +3.7 |
| Liberal Democrats | John Malcolm Charles Cole | 137 | 2.0 | −4.1 |
| Majority | | 223 | 3.2 | −3.4 |
| Turnout | | 6,873 | 61.6 | +25. |
| Labour hold | | Swing | -1.7 | |

The incumbent was Jan Smithies who stepped down at this election.

=== Little Horton ward ===
Little Horton
| Party | Candidate | Votes | % | ±% |
|---|---|---|---|---|
| Labour | Taj Mubarik Salam | 4,946 | 78.5 | −7.4 |
| Liberal Democrats | Amjad Ali | 453 | 7.2 | −0.7 |
| UKIP | Atif Khalil | 349 | 5.5 | +5.5 |
| Conservative | Sabiha Mehboob | 306 | 4.9 | −0.4 |
| Green | Nurjahan Ali Arobi | 162 | 2.6 | +2.6 |
| Majority | | 4,493 | 71.4 | −6.8 |
| Turnout | | 6,297 | 57.6 | +24.1 |
| Labour hold | | Swing | -3.4 | |

The incumbent was Sher Khan who stood down at this election.

=== Manningham ward ===
The incumbent was Asama Javed (Respect) who stood down at this election. The swing is expressed between Labour & Respect.

Manningham
| Party | Candidate | Votes | % | ±% |
|---|---|---|---|---|
| Labour | Sameena Akhtar | 3,781 | 57.1 | −15.7 |
| Respect | Mohammed Saliss | 2,209 | 33.3 | +33.3 |
| Conservative | Mohammed Ashraf Khan | 173 | 2.6 | −0.1 |
| Green | John Edward Robinson | 163 | 2.5 | −2.0 |
| UKIP | Mark Philip Hudson | 129 | 1.9 | +1.9 |
| Liberal Democrats | Margaret Isobel Chadwick | 120 | 1.8 | −17.7 |
| Majority | | 1,572 | 23.7 | −29.5 |
| Turnout | | 6,625 | 61.1 | +12.0 |
| Labour hold | | Swing | -24.5 | |

=== Queensbury ward ===
Lisa Carmody resigned early in 2017 forcing a by-election which was won by fellow Conservative Andrew Senior.

Queensbury
| Party | Candidate | Votes | % | ±% |
|---|---|---|---|---|
| Conservative | Lisa Dawn Carmody | 1,976 | 26.9 | +0.0 |
| Independent | Lynda Jane Cromie* | 1,971 | 26.8 | −7.8 |
| UKIP | Jamie Illingworth | 1,471 | 20.0 | −3.6 |
| Labour | Rosie Watson | 1,470 | 20.0 | −3.6 |
| Green | David Cooper | 300 | 4.1 | +4.1 |
| Liberal Democrats | Stacey Yeadon | 134 | 1.8 | −2.8 |
| Majority | | 506 | 6.9 | −0.8 |
| Turnout | | 7,348 | 61.9 | +23.9 |
| Conservative gain from Independent | | Swing | +3.9 | |

Lynda Cromie was elected representing the British National Party in 2011 but left the party in June 2011. The percentage change for Lynda is expressed compared to her showing for the BNP in 2011.

=== Royds ward ===
Royds
| Party | Candidate | Votes | % | ±% |
|---|---|---|---|---|
| Labour | Angela Tait | 2,523 | 38.8 | −14.4 |
| UKIP | Lois Wood | 2,083 | 32.0 | +32.0 |
| Conservative | Frances Jennifer Irene Robertshaw-Thompson | 1,333 | 20.5 | −7.7 |
| Liberal Democrats | Shauna Ann Devonshire | 227 | 3.5 | −3.1 |
| Green | Michael James Hunter | 205 | 3.2 | +3.2 |
| Independent | Colin Victor Duke | 104 | 1.6 | +1.6 |
| Majority | | 440 | 6.8 | −18.2 |
| Turnout | | 6,501 | 55.5 | +25.4 |
| Labour hold | | Swing | -23.2 | |

The incumbent was Gill Thornton who stood down at this election. The swing is expressed between Labour & UKIP.

=== Shipley ward ===
Shipley
| Party | Candidate | Votes | % | ±% |
|---|---|---|---|---|
| Green | Kevin Robert Warnes* | 3,141 | 39.4 | −3.4 |
| Labour | Ben Pickles | 2,415 | 30.3 | +4.5 |
| Conservative | David John Servant | 2,029 | 25.5 | +2.3 |
| Liberal Democrats | Christine Betty Briggs | 334 | 4.2 | +0.5 |
| Majority | | 726 | 9.1 | −7.8 |
| Turnout | | 7,972 | 71.2 | +23.5 |
| Green hold | | Swing | -3.9 | |

=== Thornton & Allerton ward ===
Thornton and Allerton
| Party | Candidate | Votes | % | ±% |
|---|---|---|---|---|
| Labour | Sue Duffy | 2,681 | 36.9 | −0.7 |
| Conservative | Clive Thomas Richardson | 2,502 | 34.4 | −12.6 |
| UKIP | Michael Evan McCabe* | 1,305 | 18.0 | +18.0 |
| Green | Helen Elizabeth Marriott | 334 | 4.6 | −6.9 |
| Respect | Rob Hoveman | 241 | 3.3 | +3.3 |
| Liberal Democrats | Derek Edwin Riley | 185 | 2.5 | −0.6 |
| Majority | | 179 | 2.5 | −7.0 |
| Turnout | | 7,264 | 63.2 | +25.6 |
| Labour gain from UKIP | | Swing | +6.0 | |

Michael Evan McCabe was elected for the Conservative Party but in January 2015 he defected to UKIP. The swing is expressed between the Labour & Conservative showings in 2011 & 2015.

=== Toller ward ===
Toller
| Party | Candidate | Votes | % | ±% |
|---|---|---|---|---|
| Labour | Fozia Shaheen | 3,088 | 41.2 | −38.5 |
| Conservative | Amjad Hussain | 1,354 | 18.1 | +6.3 |
| Independent | Amir Hussain* | 1,320 | 17.6 | +17.6 |
| Respect | Sharaz Hussain | 1,221 | 16.3 | +16.3 |
| Green | Chris Bem | 174 | 2.3 | −2.9 |
| UKIP | Mohammed Nisar | 163 | 2.2 | +2.2 |
| Liberal Democrats | David Leeming | 125 | 1.7 | −0.6 |
| Majority | | 1,734 | 23.1 | −44.7 |
| Turnout | | 7,491 | 65.1 | +21.5 |
| Labour gain from Independent | | Swing | -28.1 | |

Amir Hussain was elected to represent Labour in 2011 but lost the whip after a picture of him holding a RPG was published & stood as an independent in this election.

=== Tong ward ===
Tong
| Party | Candidate | Votes | % | ±% |
|---|---|---|---|---|
| Labour | Tess Peart | 2,424 | 44.6 | −16.1 |
| UKIP | Bernie Pringle | 1,425 | 26.2 | +26.2 |
| Conservative | Edward Christopher Ward | 1,119 | 20.6 | +0.3 |
| Liberal Democrats | Kirsty Louise Yeadon | 231 | 4.3 | −1.5 |
| Green | Matthew Clive Edwards | 206 | 3.8 | −2.6 |
| Majority | | 999 | 18.4 | −22.0 |
| Turnout | | 5,429 | 51.0 | +26.3 |
| Labour hold | | Swing | -21.2 | |

The incumbent was John Ruding who stood down at this election. The swing is expressed between Labour & UKIP

=== Wharfedale ward ===
The incumbent for the Conservative Party Jackie Whiteley was elected in a by-election 15th November 2012. The by-election was the result of the resignation of Cllr. Matt Palmer who was elected in May 2011.

Wharfedale
| Party | Candidate | Votes | % | ±% |
|---|---|---|---|---|
| Conservative | Jackie Whiteley* | 4,212 | 56.6 | −2.8 |
| Labour | Niccola Swan | 1,713 | 23.0 | +2.3 |
| Green | Cameron Rhys Herbert | 721 | 9.7 | −1.0 |
| Liberal Democrats | Bob Jones | 668 | 9.0 | +0.2 |
| TUSC | Ryan Alan William Preston | 76 | 1.0 | +1.0 |
| Majority | | 2,499 | 33.6 | −5.2 |
| Turnout | | 7,443 | 79.2 | +27.4 |
| Conservative hold | | Swing | -2.6 | |

=== Wibsey ward ===
Wibsey
| Party | Candidate | Votes | % | ±% |
|---|---|---|---|---|
| Labour | Ralph David Ritchie Berry* | 2,683 | 42.9 | −9.3 |
| UKIP | Jason Paul Smith | 1,795 | 28.7 | +18.3 |
| Conservative | Richard Ian Sheard | 1,228 | 19.6 | −3.7 |
| Liberal Democrats | Brian James Boulton | 247 | 4.0 | −3.0 |
| Green | Jack Alexander | 216 | 3.5 | +3.5 |
| TUSC | Jasmine Claire Grant | 55 | 0.9 | +0.9 |
| Majority | | 888 | 14.2 | −14.7 |
| Turnout | | 6,251 | 60.0 | +24.9 |
| Labour hold | | Swing | -13.8 | |

=== Windhill & Wrose ward ===
Windhill and Wrose
| Party | Candidate | Votes | % | ±% |
|---|---|---|---|---|
| Labour | Susan Kathryn Hinchcliffe* | 3,115 | 46.8 | +0.3 |
| Conservative | Claire-Marie Elizabeth Parr | 1,534 | 23.1 | +8.7 |
| UKIP | Vi Hong La | 1,259 | 18.9 | +18.9 |
| Liberal Democrats | Gillian Thorne | 418 | 6.3 | −26.1 |
| Green | Helen Love | 307 | 4.6 | −1.6 |
| Majority | | 1,581 | 23.8 | +9.6 |
| Turnout | | 6,653 | 61.8 | +22.9 |
| Labour hold | | Swing | -4.2 | |

The swing is expressed between Labour & Conservatives though the Conservatives were third to the Liberal Democrats in 2011.

=== Worth Valley ward ===
Worth Valley
| Party | Candidate | Votes | % | ±% |
|---|---|---|---|---|
| Conservative | Rebecca Poulsen* | 3,513 | 45.1 | −2.2 |
| Labour | Mark Bernard Curtis | 2,072 | 26.6 | −8.3 |
| UKIP | Peter Allan Gilchrist Corkindale | 1,417 | 18.2 | +18.2 |
| Green | Kevin Leahi Campbell-Wright | 507 | 6.5 | −3.2 |
| Liberal Democrats | Alan Sykes | 248 | 3.2 | −4.0 |
| Majority | | 1,441 | 18.5 | +6.2 |
| Turnout | | 7,790 | 72.8 | +30.4 |
| Conservative hold | | Swing | +3.1 | |

=== Wyke ward ===
Wyke
| Party | Candidate | Votes | % | ±% |
|---|---|---|---|---|
| Labour | Sarah Ferriby* | 2,546 | 41.9 | −10.8 |
| UKIP | John Worsley | 1,654 | 27.2 | +27.2 |
| Conservative | Francesca Louise Stefanyszyn | 1,399 | 23.0 | −5.6 |
| Green | Darren James Parkinson | 187 | 3.1 | +3.1 |
| Liberal Democrats | Kevin Anthony Hall | 185 | 3.0 | −4.2 |
| Independent | Neil Craig | 52 | 0.9 | +0.9 |
| British Democrats | Liam Andrew Kernaghan | 38 | 0.6 | +0.6 |
| Majority | | 892 | 14.7 | −9.4 |
| Turnout | | 6,081 | 61.3 | +24.1 |
| Labour hold | | Swing | -19.0 | |

== See also ==
- Bradford local elections
