= 2012 City of Bradford Metropolitan District Council election =

2012 UK local government election

Map of the results of the 2012 Bradford council election. Labour in red, Conservatives in blue, Respect in light red, Liberal Democrats in yellow, Greens in green and independent in grey.

The 2012 City of Bradford Metropolitan District Council election took place on 3 May 2012. The elections took place shortly after the Bradford West by-election, in which the Respect Party's George Galloway pulled off a shock victory against the incumbent Labour Party. Held alongside was a referendum on directly elected mayors. The Labour Party were one seat short of an overall majority following the election, leaving the council in no overall control.

== Election result ==
Of the council's 90 seats, 30 were up for election.

Bradford Council election, 2012
Party	Seats	Gains	Losses	Net gain/loss	Seats %	Votes %	Votes	+/−
Labour	12	6	3	▲3		37.6	47,219	
Conservative	8	1	7	▼6		23.4	29,332	
Respect	5	5	0	▲5		14.7	18,475	
Liberal Democrats	3	0	3	▼3		13.5	16,932	
Green	1	1	0	▲1		5.2	6,507	
Independent	1	1	0	▲1		1.5	1,836	
UKIP	0	0	0	Steady		2.8	3,482	
Democratic Nationalists	0	0	0	Steady		0.8	1,042	
BNP	0	0	0	Steady		0.4	549	
Socialist Labour	0	0	0	Steady		0.1	97	

== Ward results ==
An asterisk denotes an incumbent.

=== Baildon ward ===
Baildon
Party	Candidate	Votes	%	±%
Conservative	Debbie Davies	1,844	38.19	−1.33
Liberal Democrats	Ian Lyons	1,632	33.80	−30.86
Labour	Jen Kilyon	757	15.68	+10.50
UKIP	James Fell	331	6.85	N/A
Green	Alexander Newsham	265	5.49	N/A
Majority		212	4.39	
Turnout		4,846	41.96	−6.84
Conservative gain from Liberal Democrats		Swing		

=== Bingley ward ===
Bingley
Party	Candidate	Votes	%	±%
Conservative	John Pennington	2,790	54.13	−8.84
Labour	Andrew Mawson	1,522	29.53	+12.76
Green	Arthur Arnold	593	11.51	+2.82
Liberal Democrats	Kay Kirkham	249	4.83	−6.73
Majority		1,268	26.26	
Turnout		5,191	38.16	−4.83
Conservative hold		Swing		

=== Bingley Rural ward ===
Bingley Rural
Party	Candidate	Votes	%	±%
Conservative	Margaret Eaton*	2,775	58.34	−7.11
Labour	Robert Beckwith	1,202	25.27	+7.83
Green	Brian Newham	499	10.49	+3.68
Liberal Democrats	Alan Sykes	281	5.91	−3.29
Majority		1,573	33.07	
Turnout		4,785	35.82	−4.67
Conservative hold		Swing		

=== Bolton & Undercliffe ward ===
Bolton and Undercliffe
Party	Candidate	Votes	%	±%
Liberal Democrats	Tracey Leeming	1,888	48.96	−8.44
Labour	Gareth Logan	1,175	30.47	+9.05
Respect	Tazeem Sawaiz	529	13.72	N/A
Conservative	Ryan Robertshaw	264	6.85	−8.10
Majority		713	18.49	
Turnout		3,887	34.84	+0.80
Liberal Democrats hold		Swing		

=== Bowling & Barkerend ward ===
Bowling and Barkerend
Party	Candidate	Votes	%	±%
Labour	Hassan Khan	1,913	42.45	+9.56
Respect	Mohammed Khan	1,535	34.06	N/A
Liberal Democrats	Amjad Ali	561	12.45	−11.74
Conservative	John Robertshaw*	498	11.05	−31.88
Majority		378	8.39	
Turnout		4,546	37.47	+1.71
Labour gain from Conservative		Swing		

=== Bradford Moor ward ===
Faisal Khan resigned from the Respect Party along with four other councillors in October 2013 and served as an independent councillor until March 2015 when he rejoined the party.

Bradford Moor
Party	Candidate	Votes	%	±%
Respect	Faisal Khan	2,720	42.06	N/A
Liberal Democrats	Riaz Ahmed*	2,085	32.24	−20.31
Labour	Salma Iqbal	1,441	22.28	−11.12
UKIP	Jim Dempsey	143	2.21	N/A
Conservative	Abid Majid	78	1.21	−12.84
Majority		635	9.82	
Turnout		6,508	54.98	+6.77
Respect gain from Liberal Democrats		Swing		

=== City ward ===
Ruqayyah Collector resigned from the Respect Party along with four other councillors in October 2013 and served as an independent councillor until March 2015 when he rejoined the party.

City
Party	Candidate	Votes	%	±%
Respect	Ruqayyah Collector	2,570	56.10	N/A
Labour	Sajawal Hussain*	1,797	39.23	−24.60
Liberal Democrats	Lynne Gray	116	2.53	−6.26
Conservative	Susan Mills	98	2.14	−18.69
Majority		773	16.87	
Turnout		4,611	37.64	+0.83
Respect gain from Labour		Swing		

=== Clayton & Fairweather Green ward ===
Clayton & Fairweather Green
Party	Candidate	Votes	%	±%
Labour	Michelle Swallow	1,605	44.28	+13.07
Conservative	David Servant	905	24.97	−12.23
Respect	Dawud Islam	762	21.02	N/A
Liberal Democrats	Lorna Leeming	353	9.74	+0.62
Majority		700	19.31	
Turnout		3,648	32.30	−7.68
Labour gain from Conservative		Swing		

=== Craven ward ===
In 2008, Adrian Naylor stood successfully in this ward as a Conservative Party candidate.

Craven
Party	Candidate	Votes	%	±%
The Independents	Adrian Naylor*	1,836	40.36	−26.86
Conservative	Andrew Rowley	1,204	26.47	−40.75
Labour	Val Carroll	1,134	24.93	+6.52
Liberal Democrats	Stuart Ebden	184	4.04	−10.33
Green	Robert Nicholls	182	4.00	N/A
Majority		632	13.89	
Turnout		4,572	37.25	−0.97
Independent gain from Conservative		Swing		

=== Eccleshill ward ===
Eccleshill
Party	Candidate	Votes	%	±%
Liberal Democrats	Ann Wallace*	1,511	45.35	+8.90
Labour	Yvonne Oliver	1,242	37.27	+23.13
Conservative	Edward Ward	328	9.84	−20.73
Green	David Ford	251	7.53	N/A
Majority		269	8.07	
Turnout		3,360	29.99	−8.35
Liberal Democrats hold		Swing		

=== Great Horton ward ===
Great Horton
Party	Candidate	Votes	%	±%
Labour	Abdul Jabar	2,293	48.16	−12.34
Respect	Salim Jelani	1,542	32.39	N/A
Liberal Democrats	Mary Slingsby	536	11.26	−2.16
UKIP	Pal Bjornstom	390	8.19	N/A
Majority		751	15.77	
Turnout		4,796	42.89	+7.31
Labour hold		Swing		

=== Heaton ward ===
Mohammad Shabbir resigned from the Respect Party along with four other councillors in October 2013. He served as an independent councillor until April 2015 when he joined the Labour Party.

Heaton
Party	Candidate	Votes	%	±%
Respect	Mohammad Shabbir	2,036	39.61	N/A
Conservative	Sajid Akhtar*	1,331	25.89	−11.36
Labour	Rizwana Jamil	1,021	19.86	−0.94
Green	Celia Hickson	384	7.47	−24.96
UKIP	Sonja McNally	302	5.88	N/A
Liberal Democrats	Dominic Fear	66	1.28	−8.22
Majority		705	13.72	
Turnout		5,167	46.50	−0.83
Respect gain from Conservative		Swing		

=== Idle & Thackley ward ===
Idle and Thackley
Party	Candidate	Votes	%	±%
Liberal Democrats	Alun Griffiths*	1,968	51.67	−9.99
Labour	Michael Brown	959	25.18	+14.10
Conservative	Howard Clough	589	15.46	−11.80
Green	Vanessa Pliny	293	7.69	N/A
Majority		1,009	26.49	
Turnout		3,828	31.70	−4.56
Liberal Democrats hold		Swing		

=== Ilkley ward ===
Anne Hawkesworth left the Conservative Party in January 2013 and joined The Independents: Adrian Naylor (Craven) and Chris Greaves (Wharfedale).

Ilkley
Party	Candidate	Votes	%	±%
Conservative	Anne Hawkesworth*	2,436	49.33	−15.01
Labour	Ann Cryer	1,683	34.08	+19.83
UKIP	Paul Latham	354	7.17	N/A
Green	Brian Ford	238	4.82	−5.61
Liberal Democrats	Peter Ferguson	227	4.60	−6.37
Majority		753	15.25	
Turnout		4,954	43.92	−1.44
Conservative hold		Swing		

=== Keighley Central ward ===
Keighley Central
Party	Candidate	Votes	%	±%
Labour	Khadim Hussain*	2,435	47.23	−5.63
Conservative	Zafar Ali	2,169	42.07	+13.07
Liberal Democrats	Gerald Brooksbank	552	10.71	−7.43
Majority		266	5.16	
Turnout		5,218	44.64	+1.39
Labour hold		Swing		

=== Keighley East ward ===
Keighley East
Party	Candidate	Votes	%	±%
Labour	Malcolm Slater	2,511	58.83	+16.72
Conservative	Dorothy Clamp*	1,400	32.80	−10.66
Liberal Democrats	Judith Brooksbank	357	8.36	−6.05
Majority		1,111	26.03	
Turnout		4,315	36.79	−4.14
Labour gain from Conservative		Swing		

=== Keighley West ===
Keighley West
Party	Candidate	Votes	%	±%
Labour	Adrian Farley	1,876	62.39	+19.75
Conservative	Brian Hudson	844	28.07	−16.45
Liberal Democrats	Mike Wilkinson	287	9.54	−3.30
Majority		1,032	34.32	
Turnout		3,050	28.91	−3.21
Labour gain from Conservative		Swing		

=== Little Horton ward ===
- Ian Greenwood had been the Bradford City Council leader prior to the election.
- Alyas Karmani resigned from the Respect Party along with four other councillors in October 2013 and served as an independent councillor until March 2015 when he rejoined the party.

Little Horton
Party	Candidate	Votes	%	±%
Respect	Alyas Karmani	2,191	47.83	N/A
Labour	Ian Greenwood*	2,174	47.46	−12.99
Conservative	Andrea Taylor	120	2.62	−12.24
Liberal Democrats	Shabir Butt	96	2.10	−22.60
Majority		17	0.37	
Turnout		4,603	41.52	+8.25
Respect gain from Labour		Swing		

=== Manningham ward ===
Ishtiaq Ahmed resigned from the Respect Party along with four other councillors in October 2013 and served as an independent councillor until March 2015 when he rejoined the party.

Manningham
Party	Candidate	Votes	%	±%
Respect	Ishtiaq Ahmed	3,265	57.45	+50.09
Labour	Soofi Amin	2,126	37.41	−5.84
Green	John Robinson	147	2.59	−1.40
Conservative	Qurban Malik	87	1.53	−3.06
Liberal Democrats	Brendan Stubbs	58	1.02	−38.55
Majority		1,139	20.04	
Turnout		5,725	50.03	+0.89
Respect gain from Labour		Swing		

=== Queensbury ward ===
Queensbury
Party	Candidate	Votes	%	±%
Conservative	Michael Walls*	1,073	30.20	−7.88
Labour	Rosie Watson	956	26.91	+11.06
UKIP	Jason Smith	884	24.88	+19.83
BNP	Eric Baxendale	549	15.45	−18.36
Liberal Democrats	Michael Stelling	91	2.56	−4.24
Majority		117	3.29	
Turnout		3,570	31.50	−8.20
Conservative hold		Swing		

=== Royds ward ===
Royds
Party	Candidate	Votes	%	±%
Labour	Andrew Thornton*	1,771	58.90	+19.79
Conservative	Sharon Robertshaw	571	18.99	−6.51
Democratic Nationalists	James Lewthwaite	453	15.06	+7.43
Liberal Democrats	Brian Boulton	212	7.05	−1.55
Majority		1,200	39.91	
Turnout		3,035	26.43	−5.31
Labour hold		Swing		

=== Shipley ward ===
Shipley
Party	Candidate	Votes	%	±%
Green	Martin Love*	2,323	52.02	+4.24
Labour	Andrew McCormick	862	19.30	+4.61
Conservative	Mike Pollard	755	16.91	−10.08
UKIP	Philip Bird	297	6.65	+3.38
Liberal Democrats	Christine Briggs	132	2.96	−2.27
Socialist Labour	Christopher Butler	97	2.17	N/A
Majority		1,461	32.71	
Turnout		4,484	40.57	−3.27
Green hold		Swing		

=== Thornton & Allerton ward ===
Thornton and Allerton
Party	Candidate	Votes	%	±%
Conservative	Charles Sykes*	1,633	45.29	+3.34
Labour	Mark Blackburn	1,074	29.78	+9.79
Respect	Patrick Mulligan	648	17.97	N/A
Liberal Democrats	Kezia Rooke	251	6.96	−4.42
Majority		559	15.50	
Turnout		3,633	33.36	−4.43
Conservative hold		Swing		

=== Toller ward ===
163 (3.66%) ballot papers were rejected, compared to 48 (0.96%) in the 2008 election in this ward. Arshad Hussain stood successfully here as a Conservative Party candidate in 2008, before defecting in 2010 following a race row - his vote change corresponds to the 2008 Labour Party candidate, Sobia Kauser.

Toller
Party	Candidate	Votes	%	±%
Labour	Arshad Hussain*	3,346	78.07	+42.54
Liberal Democrats	David Leeming	482	11.25	−12.57
Conservative	Rosie Russell	458	10.69	−24.99
Majority		2,864	66.82	
Turnout		4,449	37.83	−10.17
Labour gain from Conservative		Swing		

=== Tong ward ===
Tong
Party	Candidate	Votes	%	±%
Labour	Michael Johnson*	1,385	57.61	+28.87
Respect	Sarah Cartin	385	16.01	N/A
Liberal Democrats	Kirsty Yeadon	358	14.89	+3.56
Democratic Nationalists	Liam Kernaghan	276	11.48	+8.81
Majority		1,000	41.60	
Turnout		2,444	21.11	−3.74
Labour hold		Swing		

=== Wharfedale ward ===
Wharfedale
Party	Candidate	Votes	%	±%
Conservative	Dale Smith*	2,252	60.80	−5.24
Labour	Dave Allen	694	18.74	+9.67
Green	Janet Souyave	565	15.25	+6.80
Liberal Democrats	Gillian Thorne	193	5.21	−11.24
Majority		1,558	42.06	
Turnout		3,718	40.53	−4.81
Conservative hold		Swing		

=== Wibsey ward ===
Wibsey
Party	Candidate	Votes	%	±%
Labour	David Green*	1,753	52.85	+14.29
UKIP	Jamie Illingworth	781	23.55	+20.79
Conservative	Thomas McMeeking	399	12.03	−13.39
Liberal Democrats	Christopher Boulton	384	11.58	+0.26
Majority		972	29.30	
Turnout		3,330	33.52	−1.94
Labour hold		Swing		

=== Windhill & Wrose ward ===
Windhill and Wrose
Party	Candidate	Votes	%	±%
Labour	Alex Ross-Shaw	1,604	43.96	+12.31
Liberal Democrats	John Watmough	1,401	38.39	−1.20
Conservative	Derek Green	367	10.06	−7.24
Green	Helen Love	277	7.59	+4.99
Majority		203	5.56	
Turnout		3,669	34.84	−2.67
Labour gain from Liberal Democrats		Swing		

=== Worth Valley ward ===
Worth Valley
Party	Candidate	Votes	%	±%
Conservative	Russell Brown	1,372	42.33	−17.71
Labour	Mark Curtis	1,141	35.21	+10.29
Green	Robert Swindells	490	15.12	+7.65
Liberal Democrats	Sharon Purvis	238	7.34	−0.23
Majority		231	7.13	
Turnout		3,284	31.72	−8.07
Conservative hold		Swing		

=== Wyke ward ===
Wyke
Party	Candidate	Votes	%	±%
Labour	David Robinson*	1,767	54.42	+22.38
Conservative	Richard Milczanowski	692	21.31	−8.35
Democratic Nationalists	Neil Craig	313	9.64	+0.68
Respect	James Clayton	292	8.99	N/A
Liberal Democrats	Kevin Hall	183	5.64	−6.73
Majority		1,075	33.11	
Turnout		3,268	31.96	−4.00
Labour hold		Swing		

== Referendum result ==
Mayoral referendums were held in 11 local authorities across England to decide whether to introduce directly elected mayors, as opposed in Bradford to the previous system of Councillors electing a leader of the council. Alongside Birmingham, Coventry, Leeds, Newcastle upon Tyne, Nottingham, Sheffield and Wakefield, Bradford voted against directly elected mayors. Only Bristol and Doncaster voted in favour.

Bradford Mayoral referendum 2012
Choice	Votes	%
For	53,949	44.87
Against	66,283	55.13
Total	120,232	100.00
Registered voters/turnout	341,126	35.25

== By-elections between 2012 and 2013 elections ==
Vote changes correspond to the 2012 Council election.

=== Wharfedale ward ===
This was triggered by the resignation of Cllr. Matt Palmer, who had stood successfully for the Conservative Party in this ward in the 2003, 2007 and 2011 council elections, in early October.

Wharfedale by-election, 15 November 2012
Party	Candidate	Votes	%	±%
Conservative	Jackie Whiteley	1,353	54.03	−6.77
Labour	David Green	485	19.37	+0.63
Green	Janet Souyave	320	12.78	−2.47
Liberal Democrats	Paul Treadwell	222	8.87	+3.66
UKIP	Samuel Fletcher	124	4.95	N/A
Majority		868	34.66	
Turnout		2,516	27.51	−13.02
Conservative hold		Swing		

== See also ==
Bradford local elections
