= 2003 City of Bradford Metropolitan District Council election =

2003 UK local government election

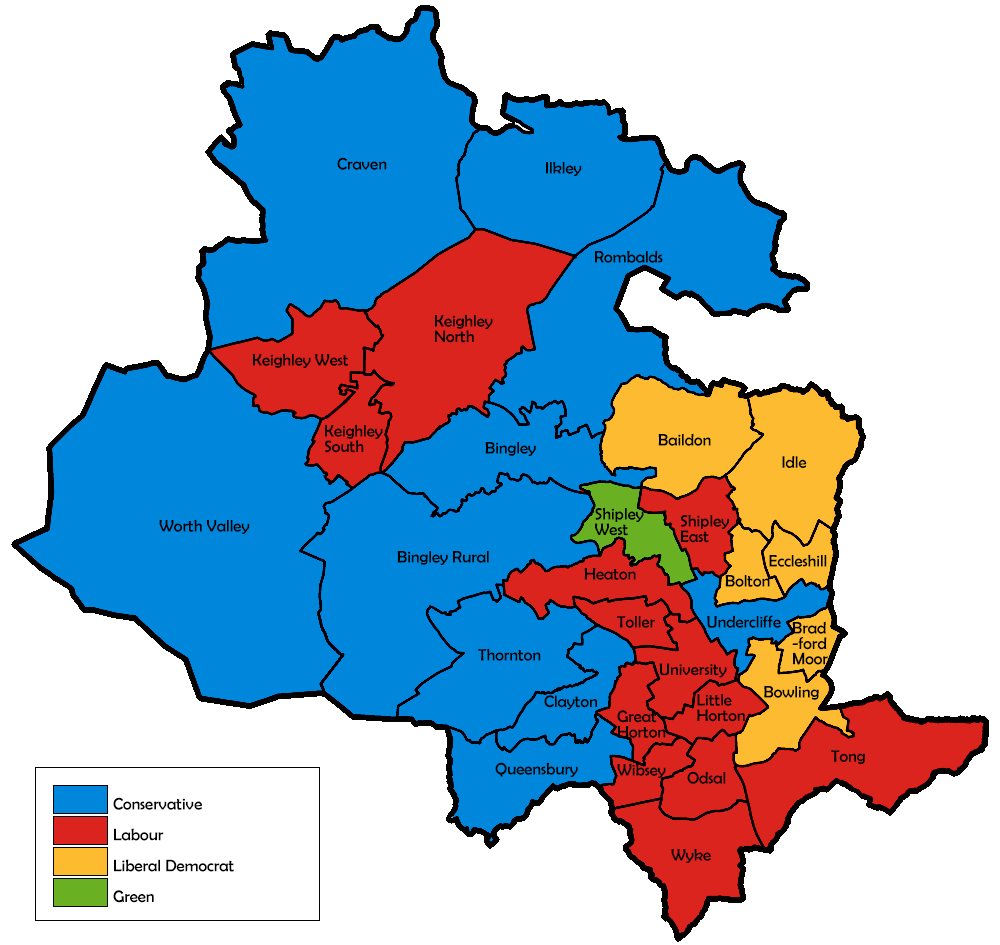
Map of the results for the 2003 Bradford council election.

Elections to City of Bradford Metropolitan District Council were held on 1 May 2003. Before the election, Wibsey Labour councillor, Keith Thomson, had defected to Independent. One third of the council was up for election, and it remained under no overall control.

== Election result ==
Bradford local election result 2003
Party	Seats	Gains	Losses	Net gain/loss	Seats %	Votes %	Votes	+/−
Labour	13	1	2	▼1	43.3	30.4	33,604	-8.0
Conservative	10	1	3	▼2	33.3	32.6	35,988	-5.9
Liberal Democrats	6	2	0	▲2	20.0	23.4	25,885	+6.8
Green	1	1	0	▲1	3.3	5.6	6,140	+1.7
BNP	0	0	0	Steady	0.0	5.8	6,391	+5.4
Independent	0	0	0	Steady	0.0	2.0	2,170	-0.0
Socialist Alliance	0	0	0	Steady	0.0	0.2	235	-0.0

This result had the following consequences for the total number of seats on the council after the elections:

Party	Previous council	New council
Conservative	38	36
Labour	37	36
Liberal Democrat	12	14
Green	2	3
Independent	1	1
Total	90	90
Working majority	-14	-18

== Ward results ==
Baildon
Party	Candidate	Votes	%	±%
Liberal Democrats	John Malcolm Cole	2,365	46.2	−2.4
Conservative	Edward Ward	1,207	23.6	−15.8
BNP	David Hobson	842	16.4	+16.4
Labour	Miranda Vasey	564	11.0	+2.8
Green	Kevin Warnes	143	2.8	−1.1
Majority		1,158	22.6	+13.4
Turnout		5,125	42.2	+1.7
Liberal Democrats hold		Swing	+6.7	

Bingley
Party	Candidate	Votes	%	±%
Conservative	Robin Owens	1,972	49.4	−1.7
Labour	Frank Needham	1,231	30.8	−2.4
Liberal Democrats	Alan Sykes	505	12.6	+3.0
Green	Arthur John Arnold	283	7.1	+1.1
Majority		741	18.6	+0.6
Turnout		4,001	37.6	−4.4
Conservative hold		Swing	+0.3	

Bingley Rural
Party	Candidate	Votes	%	±%
Conservative	Andrew Cooke	2,149	57.4	−5.5
Labour	James Newton	871	23.3	−0.5
Liberal Democrats	Margaret Fielden	474	12.7	+4.3
Green	Brian Newham	250	6.7	+1.7
Majority		1,278	34.1	−5.0
Turnout		3,779	32.2	−4.8
Conservative hold		Swing	-2.5	

Bolton
Party	Candidate	Votes	%	±%
Liberal Democrats	David Gray	1,866	52.6	−10.2
BNP	Arthur Bentley	657	18.5	+18.5
Labour	Jagtar Deol	606	17.1	−3.8
Conservative	Peter Benson	420	11.8	−4.6
Majority		1,209	34.1	−7.8
Turnout		3,552	35.2	−1.4
Liberal Democrats hold		Swing	-14.3	

Bowling
Party	Candidate	Votes	%	±%
Liberal Democrats	Rupert Oliver	2,077	61.3	+30.1
Labour	Mohammed Darr	809	23.9	−21.3
Conservative	Fayzul Islam	500	14.8	−8.8
Majority		1,268	37.4	+23.5
Turnout		3,395	29.9	−1.8
Liberal Democrats gain from Labour		Swing	+25.7	

Bradford Moor
Party	Candidate	Votes	%	±%
Liberal Democrats	Mohammod Islam	1,945	41.7	+30.4
Conservative	Sakhawat Hussain	1,577	33.8	−12.8
Labour	Susanne Rooney	1,147	24.6	−17.6
Majority		368	7.9	+3.4
Turnout		4,727	44.5	+0.8
Liberal Democrats gain from Conservative		Swing	+21.6	

Clayton
Party	Candidate	Votes	%	±%
Conservative	Elaine Byrom	1,267	35.5	−8.6
Labour	Olayemi Fagborun	1,058	29.6	−6.5
BNP	Lynda Cromie	691	19.3	+19.3
Liberal Democrats	Lorna Leeming	449	12.6	−3.0
Green	Alexander Suchi	107	3.0	−1.2
Majority		209	5.8	−2.1
Turnout		3,578	34.9	+2.5
Conservative hold		Swing	-1.0	

Craven
Party	Candidate	Votes	%	±%
Conservative	David Emmott	2,178	56.6	+1.8
Labour	Francis Harrison	996	25.9	−5.8
Liberal Democrats	Hamish Hay	671	17.4	+4.0
Majority		1,182	30.7	+7.6
Turnout		3,858	31.1	−3.4
Conservative hold		Swing	+3.8	

Eccleshill
Party	Candidate	Votes	%	±%
Liberal Democrats	Michael Attenborough	1,130	37.9	+5.0
Labour	Gareth Logan	847	28.4	−3.2
BNP	Kerry Bedford	519	17.4	+2.7
Conservative	Richard Sheard	431	14.4	−3.6
Green	Joan Foulds	56	1.9	+1.9
Majority		283	9.5	+8.2
Turnout		2,987	32.4	−3.5
Liberal Democrats hold		Swing	+4.1	

Great Horton
Party	Candidate	Votes	%	±%
Labour	John Godward	1,263	37.8	−17.7
Conservative	Richard Milczanowski	739	22.1	−8.3
Liberal Democrats	Margaret Chadwick	573	17.1	+8.8
BNP	James Breslin	546	16.3	+16.3
Green	Derek Curtis	221	6.6	+1.0
Majority		524	15.7	−9.4
Turnout		3,346	31.3	−2.7
Labour hold		Swing	-4.7	

Heaton
Party	Candidate	Votes	%	±%
Labour	Mark Fielding	1,544	35.5	−4.4
Conservative	Mohammad Masood	1,238	28.4	−18.3
Liberal Democrats	Mohammed Mirza	1,124	25.8	+19.0
Green	John Francis Love	448	10.3	+5.0
Majority		306	7.0	+0.2
Turnout		4,372	37.9	−5.1
Labour hold		Swing	+6.9	

Idle
Party	Candidate	Votes	%	±%
Liberal Democrats	Ann Lesley Ozolins	2,266	52.1	+1.8
BNP	Stewart Williams	874	20.1	+20.1
Conservative	Harry Sissling	596	13.7	−14.5
Labour	Shofiqul Islam	497	11.4	−10.2
Green	Judith Wever	119	2.7	+2.7
Majority		1,392	32.0	+9.9
Turnout		4,359	35.4	−0.2
Liberal Democrats hold		Swing	-9.1	

Ilkley
Party	Candidate	Votes	%	±%
Conservative	Brian Smith	2,441	57.9	−6.3
Labour	Paul Dutton	994	23.6	+0.2
Liberal Democrats	James Keeley	777	18.4	+6.1
Majority		1,447	34.3	−6.5
Turnout		4,240	38.6	−4.4
Conservative hold		Swing	-3.2	

Keighley North
Party	Candidate	Votes	%	±%
Labour	Malcolm Slater	1,598	38.4	−9.4
Conservative	Nancy Holdsworth	1,293	31.1	−10.0
Green	Arif Hussain	871	20.9	+20.9
Liberal Democrats	James Main	397	9.5	−1.6
Majority		305	7.3	+0.6
Turnout		4,174	37.9	+0.8
Labour hold		Swing	+0.3	

Keighley South
Party	Candidate	Votes	%	±%
Labour	Lynne Joyce	1,149	51.2	−11.2
Liberal Democrats	Christopher Campbell Brown	568	25.3	+14.2
Conservative	Robert Payne	529	23.5	−2.9
Majority		581	25.9	−10.1
Turnout		2,282	26.4	−3.4
Labour hold		Swing	-12.7	

Keighley West
Party	Candidate	Votes	%	±%
Labour	Barry Thorne	1,123	34.6	−10.2
Conservative	David McKay	949	29.2	−1.9
Liberal Democrats	Isa Khan	504	15.5	+5.5
Independent	Brian Hudson	407	12.5	−1.6
Independent	John Philip	264	8.1	+8.1
Majority		174	5.4	−8.2
Turnout		3,274	29.2	−4.9
Labour hold		Swing	-4.1	

Little Horton
Party	Candidate	Votes	%	±%
Labour	Ian Greenwood	1,297	43.5	−7.5
Conservative	Khadam Hussain	1,119	37.5	+2.8
Liberal Democrats	Paul Michell	444	14.9	+7.6
Green	Brian Ford	123	4.1	−0.3
Majority		174	6.0	−10.3
Turnout		2,991	30.9	−5.9
Labour hold		Swing	-5.1	

Odsal
Party	Candidate	Votes	%	±%
Labour	David Adam Green	1,604	50.7	−0.3
Conservative	Jonathan Stubbs	871	27.5	−3.5
Liberal Democrats	Christopher Boulton	687	21.7	+6.3
Majority		733	23.2	+3.2
Turnout		3,184	27.3	−4.7
Labour hold		Swing	+1.6	

Queensbury
Party	Candidate	Votes	%	±%
Conservative	Andrew Smith	1,633	32.9	−10.1
BNP	Paul Cromie	1,489	30.0	+30.0
Labour	Carolyn Lowing	1,370	27.6	−12.9
Liberal Democrats	Susan Lambert	472	9.5	−1.1
Majority		144	2.9	+0.4
Turnout		4,969	37.4	+7.3
Conservative hold		Swing	-20.0	

Rombalds
Party	Candidate	Votes	%	±%
Conservative	Matthew Palmer	2,678	57.1	+0.3
Liberal Democrats	Ambrose Micklem	906	19.3	+0.8
Labour	Andrew Dundas	860	18.3	−6.4
Green	Julie Cowdery	243	5.2	+5.2
Majority		1,772	37.8	+5.7
Turnout		4,704	37.2	−3.0
Conservative hold		Swing	-0.2	

Shipley East
Party	Candidate	Votes	%	±%
Labour	Mark Blackburn	1,172	38.9	−12.0
BNP	Christopher Hill	773	25.6	+25.6
Conservative	Derek Taylor	470	15.6	−8.4
Liberal Democrats	John Hall	464	15.4	−2.9
Green	Christina Love	135	4.5	−2.3
Majority		399	13.2	−13.7
Turnout		3,016	31.3	+1.9
Labour hold		Swing	-18.8	

Shipley West
Party	Candidate	Votes	%	±%
Green	Robert Nicholls	2,423	50.3	+8.2
Conservative	William Mills Oldfield	1,298	26.9	−3.1
Labour	Vanda Greenwood	700	14.5	−7.9
Liberal Democrats	Alexander Cole	397	8.2	+2.8
Majority		1,125	23.3	+11.3
Turnout		4,834	42.7	−4.4
Green gain from Conservative		Swing	+5.6	

Thornton
Party	Candidate	Votes	%	±%
Conservative	John Buffham	1,381	44.1	+1.0
Independent	Melanie Milnes	876	28.0	+0.3
Labour	Catherine Rowen	540	17.2	−2.9
Liberal Democrats	David Weston	216	6.9	+1.2
Green	Michael Rawnsley	119	3.8	+0.4
Majority		505	16.1	+0.7
Turnout		3,137	33.2	−1.7
Conservative hold		Swing	+0.3	

Toller
Party	Candidate	Votes	%	±%
Labour	Amir Hussain	1,623	43.1	−14.8
Liberal Democrats	Christine Reid	1,259	33.4	+27.6
Conservative	John Robertshaw	886	23.5	−12.8
Majority		364	9.7	−11.9
Turnout		3,791	32.5	−16.7
Labour hold		Swing	-21.2	

Tong
Party	Candidate	Votes	%	±%
Labour	Michael Johnson	1,172	63.2	+0.4
Conservative	Michael George Ellis	379	20.4	−5.6
Liberal Democrats	Joan Collins	304	16.4	+5.2
Majority		793	42.7	+6.0
Turnout		1,863	20.0	−4.3
Labour hold		Swing	+3.0	

Undercliffe
Party	Candidate	Votes	%	±%
Conservative	Mohammed Jamil	1,124	36.5	+5.8
Labour	Raymond Bage	890	28.9	−13.2
Liberal Democrats	Edward Hallmann	839	27.3	+5.8
Green	Steven Schofield	222	7.2	+1.6
Majority		234	7.6	−3.7
Turnout		3,102	31.1	−3.8
Conservative gain from Labour		Swing	+9.5	

University
Party	Candidate	Votes	%	±%
Labour	Munir Ahmed	1,937	39.7	−15.9
Conservative	Meherban Hussain	1,221	25.0	−9.3
Liberal Democrats	Naveed Ilyas	721	14.8	+10.0
Independent	Karl Dallas	623	12.8	+12.8
Green	John Robinson	377	7.7	+2.4
Majority		716	14.7	−6.5
Turnout		4,906	36.2	−7.7
Labour gain from Conservative		Swing	-3.3	

Wibsey
Party	Candidate	Votes	%	±%
Labour	Ralph Ritchie Berry	1,400	50.6	−9.3
Conservative	Dorothy Craven	859	31.0	+2.4
Liberal Democrats	Brian Boulton	508	18.4	+6.9
Majority		541	19.5	−11.7
Turnout		2,788	28.8	−4.9
Labour hold		Swing	-5.8	

Worth Valley
Party	Candidate	Votes	%	±%
Conservative	Glen Miller	1,653	45.7	+4.0
Labour	Mark Curtis	1,279	35.4	+6.0
Liberal Democrats	Samuel Harris	448	12.4	+3.9
Socialist Alliance	Jillian Crowther	235	6.5	+6.5
Majority		374	10.3	−2.0
Turnout		3,636	30.6	−5.9
Conservative hold		Swing	-1.0	

Wyke
Party	Candidate	Votes	%	±%
Labour	Rosemary Watson	1,463	50.1	+3.9
Conservative	John Arthur Stead	930	31.8	−1.3
Liberal Democrats	Matthew Boulton	529	18.1	−2.6
Majority		533	18.2	+5.2
Turnout		2,940	25.4	−2.0
Labour hold		Swing	+2.6	

== By-elections between 2003 and 2004 ==
Great Horton By-Election 16 October 2003
Party	Candidate	Votes	%	±%
Labour	Liz Devlin	926	36.9	−0.9
Conservative	Richard Milczanowski	764	30.4	+8.3
Liberal Democrats	Paul Michell	692	27.6	+10.5
Green	Derek Curtis	129	5.1	−1.5
Majority		162	6.5	−9.2
Turnout		2,511	23.4	−7.9
Labour gain from Conservative		Swing	-4.6	
