= 2019 City of Bradford Metropolitan District Council election =

2019 UK local government election

Map showing the results of the 2019 City of Bradford Metropolitan District Council election

The 2019 City of Bradford Metropolitan District Council Election took place on 2 May 2019 to elect members of Bradford Metropolitan District Council in England.

== Results summary ==
2019 City of Bradford Metropolitan District Council election
Party	This election				Full council			This election		
Party	Candidates	Seats	Net	Seats %	Other	Total	Total %	Votes	Votes %	+/−
Labour	{{{candidates}}}	18	▲1	60.0	34	53	58.9	51,134	46.0	
Conservative	{{{candidates}}}	9	Steady	30.0	13	22	24.4	27,243	24.5	
Liberal Democrats	{{{candidates}}}	2	▼1	6.7	5	7	7.8	11,820	10.6	
Green	{{{candidates}}}	1	Steady	3.3	1	2	2.2	14,271	12.8	
UKIP	{{{candidates}}}	0	Steady	0.0	0	0	0.0	5,078	4.6	
British Democrats	{{{candidates}}}	0	Steady	0.0	0	0	0.0	701	0.6	
Independent	{{{candidates}}}	0	Steady	0.0	5	5	5.6	418	0.4	
Yorkshire	{{{candidates}}}	0	Steady	0.0	0	0	0.0	417	0.4	
Democrats and Veterans	{{{candidates}}}	0	Steady	0.0	0	0	0.0	86	0.1	
Queensbury Independents	{{{candidates}}}	0	Steady	0.0	1	1	1.1	–	–	

== Ward results ==
=== Baildon ===
Baildon
Party	Candidate	Votes	%	±%
Conservative	Mike Pollard	2,089	46.5	▼4.0
Labour	Thomas Sutton	1,141	25.4	▲1.1
UKIP	Stephen Price	475	10.6	▲2.6
Liberal Democrats	David Wilkinson	465	10.4	▼0.9
Green	Carl Dunk	322	7.2	▲1.7
Majority		948	21.10	▼5.06
Turnout		4,492	37.5	
Conservative hold		Swing		

=== Bingley ===
Bingley
Party	Candidate	Votes	%	±%
Conservative	Geoff Winnard	2,271	39.8	
Labour	Marcus Dearden	2,098	36.8	
Green	Rachael Drucquer	600	10.5	
Independent	Mark Shaw	418	7.3	
Liberal Democrats	Glen Cheney	318	5.6	
Majority				
Turnout		5,705	40.2	
Conservative hold		Swing		

=== Bingley Rural ===
Bingley Rural
Party	Candidate	Votes	%	±%
Conservative	Paul Sullivan	2,811	55.8	
Labour	Mohammed Miah	999	19.8	
Green	Brian Newham	833	16.5	
Liberal Democrats	Helen Baranowski	396	7.9	
Majority				
Turnout		5,039	34.6	
Conservative hold		Swing		

=== Bolton and Undercliffe ===
Bolton and Undercliffe
Party	Candidate	Votes	%	±%
Labour	Suhail Choudhry	1,687	44.9	
Liberal Democrats	Jafrul Gazi	1,315	35.0	
Conservative	Ranbir Singh	395	10.5	
Green	Jasmine Sharp	357	9.5	
Majority				
Turnout		3,754	31.8	
Labour gain from Liberal Democrats		Swing		

=== Bowling and Barkerend ===
Bowling and Barkerend
Party	Candidate	Votes	%	±%
Labour	Imran Khan	2,516	68.9	
Conservative	Ansar Mahmood	535	14.6	
Green	Andrew Stanford	402	11.0	
Liberal Democrats	Aryan Safi	199	5.4	
Majority				
Turnout		3,652	28.1	
Labour hold		Swing		

=== Bradford Moor ===
Bradford Moor
Party	Candidate	Votes	%	±%
Labour	Zafar Iqbal	3,357	82.0	
Conservative	Zubair Hussain	333	8.1	
Liberal Democrats	Amjad Ali	253	6.2	
Green	Julia McGoldrick	149	3.6	
Majority				
Turnout		4,092	32.7	
Labour hold		Swing		

=== City ===
City
Party	Candidate	Votes	%	±%
Labour	Shakeela Lal	2,416	82.4	
Green	Charlotte Woollard	191	6.5	
Liberal Democrats	Abid Iqbal	174	5.9	
Conservative	Geoff Whiteley	151	5.2	
Majority				
Turnout		2,932	24.4	
Labour hold		Swing		

=== Clayton and Fairweather Green ===
Clayton and Fairweather Green
Party	Candidate	Votes	%	±%
Labour	Carol Thirkill	1,924	60.4	
Conservative	Sajid Akhtar	764	24.0	
Green	Susan May	359	11.3	
Liberal Democrats	Steven Cotterill	139	4.4	
Majority				
Turnout		3,186	27.2	
Labour hold		Swing		

=== Craven ===
Craven
Party	Candidate	Votes	%	±%
Conservative	Owen Goodall	1,371	27.6	
Labour	David Loud	1,126	22.7	
Independent	Chris Atkinson	1,113	22.4	
Green	Caroline Whitaker	946	19.1	
Liberal Democrats	Paul Mann	215	4.3	
Yorkshire	Peter Kaye	190	3.8	
Majority				
Turnout		4,961	36.5	
Conservative hold		Swing		

=== Eccleshill ===
Eccleshill
Party	Candidate	Votes	%	±%
Liberal Democrats	Susan Knox	1,254	40.2	
Labour	Margaret Alipoor	1,018	32.6	
UKIP	Sam Wood	430	13.8	
Conservative	Harry Boota	234	7.5	
Green	Sarah Dick	104	3.3	
Yorkshire	Lara Barras	79	2.5	
Majority				
Turnout		3,119	25.1	
Liberal Democrats hold		Swing		

=== Great Horton ===
Great Horton
Party	Candidate	Votes	%	±%
Labour	Tariq Hussain	2,460	75.4	
Conservative	Kamran Sakhawat	322	9.9	
Green	Lesley Hall	276	8.5	
Liberal Democrats	Mark Whitrick	206	6.3	
Majority				
Turnout		3,264	29.7	
Labour hold		Swing		

=== Heaton ===
Heaton
Party	Candidate	Votes	%	±%
Labour	Mohammed Amran	2,701	75.0	
Green	Celia Hickson	506	14.1	
Conservative	Awais Hussain	252	7.0	
Liberal Democrats	Ines Riach	142	3.9	
Majority				
Turnout		3,601	30.8	
Labour hold		Swing		

=== Idle and Thackley ===
Idle and Thackley
Party	Candidate	Votes	%	±%
Liberal Democrats	Jeanette Sunderland	2,454	62.0	
Labour	Alex Mitchell	546	13.8	
UKIP	Garry Blackmore	508	12.8	
Conservative	Rasjid Skinner	226	5.7	
Green	Tess Lawrence	221	5.6	
Majority				
Turnout		3,955	30.8	
Liberal Democrats hold		Swing		

=== Ilkley ===
Ilkley
Party	Candidate	Votes	%	±%
Conservative	Kyle Green	1,982	36.4	
Green	Ros Brown	1,386	25.4	
Labour	Kath Steward	1,077	19.8	
Liberal Democrats	Thomas Franks	1,002	18.4	
Majority				
Turnout		5,447	45.6	
Conservative hold		Swing		

=== Keighley Central ===
Keighley Central
Party	Candidate	Votes	%	±%
Conservative	Zafar Ali	2,183	49.8	
Labour	Cath Bacon	1,744	39.8	
Green	Allan Swales	288	6.6	
Liberal Democrats	Peter Russell	165	3.8	
Majority				
Turnout		4,380	37.7	
Conservative hold		Swing		

=== Keighley East ===
Keighley East
Party	Candidate	Votes	%	±%
Labour	Doreen Lee	2,111	53.2	
Conservative	Peter Corkindale	1,017	25.6	
Green	Trudie Jackson	637	16.0	
Liberal Democrats	Bob Jones	206	5.2	
Majority				
Turnout		3,971	32.7	
Labour hold		Swing		

=== Keighley West ===
Keighley West
Party	Candidate	Votes	%	±%
Labour	Julie Lintern	1,364	47.1	
Conservative	John Kirby	748	25.8	
UKIP	Ian Bannister	618	21.3	
Liberal Democrats	John Cole	168	5.8	
Majority				
Turnout		2,898	25.0	
Labour hold		Swing		

=== Little Horton ===
Little Horton
Party	Candidate	Votes	%	±%
Labour	Taj Salam	2,723	85.8	
Liberal Democrats	Ian Vipond	170	5.4	
Conservative	Ghazanfar Hussain	150	4.7	
Green	Nurjahan Arobi	130	4.1	
Majority				
Turnout		3,173	27.6	
Labour hold		Swing		

=== Manningham ===
Manningham
Party	Candidate	Votes	%	±%
Labour	Sameena Akhtar	2,749	88.9	
Green	Bruce Barnes	163	5.3	
Conservative	Jawad Hussain	105	3.4	
Liberal Democrats	Anthea Pickard	74	2.4	
Majority				
Turnout		3,091	26.6	
Labour hold		Swing		

=== Queensbury ===
Queensbury
Party	Candidate	Votes	%	±%
Conservative	Matthew Bibby	1,005	32.4	
Labour	Eve Wagster	845	27.2	
UKIP	Terry Duggan	668	21.5	
Green	Eithne Dodwell	330	10.6	
Liberal Democrats	Christopher Dougherty	257	8.3	
Majority				
Turnout		3,105	25.1	
Conservative hold		Swing		

=== Royds ===
Royds
Party	Candidate	Votes	%	±%
Labour	Angela Tait	1,183	42.6	
UKIP	Derrick Hodgson	750	27.0	
Conservative	David Servant	468	16.9	
Green	Phil Worsnop	198	7.1	
Liberal Democrats	Shauna Devonshire	179	6.4	
Majority				
Turnout		2,778	22.7	
Labour hold		Swing		

=== Shipley ===
Shipley
Party	Candidate	Votes	%	±%
Green	Kevin Warnes	2,875	55.3	
Labour	Stephen Blundell	1,662	32.0	
Conservative	Andrew Quarrie	416	8.0	
Yorkshire	Darren Longhorn	148	2.8	
Liberal Democrats	Caroline Jones	99	1.9	
Majority				
Turnout		5,200	45.2	
Green hold		Swing		

=== Thornton and Allerton ===
Thornton and Allerton
Party	Candidate	Votes	%	±%
Labour	Susan Duffy	1,962	56.3	
Conservative	John Berry	948	27.2	
Green	Anna Watson	389	11.2	
Liberal Democrats	James Hunt	187	5.4	
Majority				
Turnout		3,486	28.4	
Labour hold		Swing		

=== Toller ===
Toller
Party	Candidate	Votes	%	±%
Labour	Fozia Shaheen	3,272	88.0	
Conservative	Haseeb Rashad	171	4.6	
Green	Sean Dobiech	139	3.7	
Liberal Democrats	Howard Middleton	138	3.7	
Majority				
Turnout		3,720	29.6	
Labour hold		Swing		

=== Tong ===
Tong
Party	Candidate	Votes	%	±%
Labour	Kausar Mukhtar	743	30.3	
Green	Matt Edwards	742	30.2	
UKIP	Lincoln Stead	596	24.3	
Conservative	Eddie Ward	254	10.3	
Liberal Democrats	Sylvia Oba	121	4.9	
Majority				
Turnout		2,456	19.3	
Labour hold		Swing		

=== Wharfedale ===
Wharfedale
Party	Candidate	Votes	%	±%
Conservative	Jackie Whiteley	2,014	47.4	
Labour	Chris Hayden	905	21.3	
Liberal Democrats	Jamie Needle	748	17.6	
Green	Chris Turner	581	13.7	
Majority				
Turnout		4,248	44.8	
Conservative hold		Swing		

=== Wibsey ===
Wibsey
Party	Candidate	Votes	%	±%
Labour	Ralph Berry	1,208	45.7	
UKIP	Richard Hainsworth	550	20.8	
Conservative	Richard Sheard	490	18.5	
Liberal Democrats	Brian Boulton	170	6.4	
Green	David Stevens	142	5.4	
Democrats and Veterans	Stephen Crosby	86	3.3	
Majority				
Turnout		2,646	24.9	
Labour hold		Swing		

=== Windhill and Wrose ===
Windhill and Wrose
Party	Candidate	Votes	%	±%
Labour	Susan Hinchcliffe	1,563	49.8	
Conservative	Stephen Williams	598	19.0	
UKIP	Tim Thorne	483	15.4	
Green	Helen Love	284	9.0	
Liberal Democrats	Gillian Thorne	212	6.8	
Majority				
Turnout		3,140	27.8	
Labour hold		Swing		

=== Worth Valley ===
Worth Valley
Party	Candidate	Votes	%	±%
Conservative	Rebecca Poulsen	2,409	61.3	
Labour	Faiz Ilyas	731	18.6	
Green	Janet Russell	553	14.1	
Liberal Democrats	Kay Kirkham	238	6.1	
Majority				
Turnout		3,931	36.1	
Conservative hold		Swing		

=== Wyke ===
Wyke
Party	Candidate	Votes	%	±%
Labour	Sarah Ferriby	1,303	45.6	
British Democrats	James Lewthwaite	701	24.5	
Conservative	Francesca Stefanyszyn	531	18.6	
Green	Darren Parkinson	168	5.9	
Liberal Democrats	Kevin Hall	156	5.5	
Majority				
Turnout		2,859	26.3	
Labour hold		Swing		
