= 2018 City of Bradford Metropolitan District Council election =

2018 UK local government election

City of Bradford Metropolitan District Council Elections, 2018
- 3 May 2018

One third (30 of 90) to City of Bradford Metropolitan District Council 46 seats needed for a majority
	First party	Second party	Third party
Leader	Susan Hinchcliffe	John Pennington	Jeanette Sunderland
Party	Labour	Conservative	Liberal Democrats
Leader's seat	Windhill & Wrose	Bingley	Idle & Thackley
Seats won	20, 66.6%	8, 26.6%	2, 6.6%
Seat change	▲3	▲1	▼1
Popular vote	65,207	34,547	12,159
Percentage	51.8%	27.4%	9.6%
Swing	▲11.8%	▲5.4%	▼2.1%
Council control before election
Majority
Labour
Council control after election
Majority
Labour

2018 local election results in Bradford

The 2018 City of Bradford Metropolitan District Council took place on 3 May 2018 to elect members of Bradford District Council in England. This was on the same day as other local elections. One councillor was elected in each ward for a four-year term so the councillors elected in 2018 last stood for election in 2014. Each ward is represented by three councillors, the election of which is staggered, so only one third of the councillors were elected in this election. Before the election there was a Labour majority and afterwards Labour had increased their majority.

== Results summary ==
Bradford Metropolitan District Council election results, 2018
Party	Candidates						Votes		
Party	Stood	Elected	Gained	Unseated	Net	% of total	%	No.	Net %
Labour	30	20	3	0	▲3	66.6	51.8	65,207	▲11.8
Conservative	29	8	1	0	▲1	26.6	27.4	34,547	▲5.4
Liberal Democrats	30	2	0	1	▼1	6.6	9.6	12,159	▼2.1
Green	30	0	0	1	▼1	0.0	6.2	7,859	▲0.2
UKIP	7	0	0	1	▼1	0.0	1.6	2,070	▼9.4
Independent	3	0	0	1	▼1	0.0	1.5	2,003	▼3.5
Others	1	0	0	0	Steady	0.0	0.6	773	▼0.4
Yorkshire	3	0	0	0	Steady	0.0	0.4	514	N/A
British Democrats	1	0	0	0	Steady	0.0	0.1	161	N/A
Democrats and Veterans	1	0	0	0	Steady	0.0	0.0	135	N/A
TUSC	1	0	0	0	Steady	0.0	0.0	115	Steady
Women's Equality	1	0	0	0	Steady	0.0	0.0	76	N/A
Libertarian	1	0	0	0	Steady	0.0	0.0	69	N/A
Totals	174	30				100.0	100.0	125,688	

Before the election the composition of the council was:

↓
49	21	9	6	3	2
Labour	Conservative	Lib Dem	Ind	Gr	Qb

After the election the composition of the council was:

↓
52	22	8	5	2	1
Labour	Conservative	Lib Dem	Ind	Gr	Qb

Party	Previous council	New council
Labour	49	52
Conservative	21	22
Liberal Democrats	9	8
Independent	6	5
Green	3	2
The Queensbury Ward Independents	2	1
Total	90	90

== Results by ward ==
Asterisk denotes the sitting councillor.

=== Baildon ward ===
Baildon
Party	Candidate	Votes	%	±%
Conservative	Val Townend*	2,757	57.0	11.2
Labour	Joe Ashton	1,351	27.9	10.9
Liberal Democrats	David Wilkinson	444	9.2	−20.7
Green	Andrew Stanford	197	4.1	−2.6
Women's Equality	Cat Crossley	76	1.6	1.6
Majority		1,406	29.1	13.2
Turnout		4,825	40.0	−1.6
Conservative hold		Swing	0.2	

Val Townend was the incumbent. The swing between Conservative & Labour was 0.2%. There were much bigger swings from the Liberal Democrats to both Conservatives (16.0%) & Labour (15.8%).

=== Bingley ward ===
Bingley
Party	Candidate	Votes	%	±%
Conservative	David Heseltine*	2,770	46.4	6.5
Labour	Marcus Dearden	2,443	40.9	17.0
Green	Rachael Drucquer	298	5.0	−3.3
Yorkshire	Mark Barton	230	3.9	3.9
Liberal Democrats	Peter Russell	212	3.6	−0.3
Majority		327	5.5	−10.5
Turnout		5,953	41.5	3.2
Conservative hold		Swing	-5.3	

David Heseltine was the incumbent. There was a swing of 5.3% from Conservative to Labour. UKIP did not stand this time but got 23.7% of the vote in 2014 so the biggest swings are from UKIP to Labour (20.4%) and Conservative (15.1%).

=== Bingley Rural ward ===
Bingley Rural
Party	Candidate	Votes	%	±%
Conservative	Mike Ellis*	2,929	55.5	15.6
Labour	Mohammed Miah	1,227	23.3	5.0
Liberal Democrats	Helen Baranowski	527	10.0	5.3
Green	Brian Newham	333	6.3	−1.6
UKIP	Derrick Hodgson	249	4.7	−24.3
Majority		1,702	32.3	21.3
Turnout		5,265	36.4	−0.7
Conservative hold		Swing	5.3	

Mike Ellis was the incumbent. There was a 5.3% swing from Labour to Conservative. The biggest swing was 19.9% from UKIP to Conservative.

=== Bolton and Undercliffe ward ===
Bolton and Undercliffe
Party	Candidate	Votes	%	±%
Labour	Ian Greenwood	1,686	44.5	7.1
Liberal Democrats	Rachel Sunderland*	1,596	42.1	−8.2
Conservative	Rizwan Sakhawat	376	9.9	−0.6
Green	Jasmine Sharp	113	3.0	3.0
Majority		90	2.4	−10.6
Turnout		3,771	32	−2.7
Labour gain from Liberal Democrats		Swing	7.7	

Rachel Sunderland was the incumbent for the Liberal Democrats & this ward was gained by Labour with a 7.7% swing.

=== Bowling and Barkerend ward ===
Bowling and Barkerend
Party	Candidate	Votes	%	±%
Labour	Rizwana Jamil*	3,193	77.5	21.6
Liberal Democrats	Howard Middleton	397	9.6	−9.4
Conservative	Kamran Sakhawat	309	7.5	2.0
TUSC	Ian Slattery	115	2.8	2.8
Green	Basit Khalid	101	2.5	2.5
Majority		2,796	67.8	31.0
Turnout		4,115	31.6	−4.8
Labour hold		Swing	15.5	

Rizwana Jamil was the incumbent for Labour and increased their majority with a 15.5% swing from the Liberal Democrats.

=== Bradford Moor ward ===
Bradford Moor
Party	Candidate	Votes	%	±%
Labour	Mohammed Shafiq*	3,270	53.8	7.1
Independent	Wajid Iqbal	1,432	23.6	23.6
Liberal Democrats	Jafrul Gazi	1,136	18.7	−27.0
Conservative	Rahila Parveen	132	2.2	−0.4
Green	Phil Worsnop	78	1.3	1.3
Majority		1,838	30.2	29.3
Turnout		6,048	48.6	−0.2
Labour hold		Swing	17.1	

Mohammed Shafiq was the incumbent for Labour. There was a swing of 17.1% from the Liberal Democrats who were second in 2014 to Labour. The biggest swing was a swing of 25.3% from Liberal Democrat to Independent and the swing between Labour and the Independent candidate was 8.2% from Labour to the Independent.

=== City ward ===
City
Party	Candidate	Votes	%	±%
Labour	Mohammed Azam*	3,184	87.6	9.7
Green	Charlotte Woollard	246	6.8	6.8
Liberal Democrats	Ines Riach	179	4.9	1.5
Majority		2,938	80.9	17.5
Turnout		3,609	29.4	−7.5
Labour hold		Swing	12.1	

Mohammed Azam was the incumbent for Labour. Respect was second in 2014 though they did not stand this time creating the largest swing of 12.1% between Respect and Labour. The Conservative party did not stand in this ward this time either, this being the only ward in Bradford where one of the four largest parties did not stand.

=== Clayton and Fairweather Green ward ===
Clayton & Fairweather Green
Party	Candidate	Votes	%	±%
Labour	Sinead Engel*	2,182	62.0	10.7
Conservative	Harry Boota	983	27.9	10.3
Green	Susan May	212	6.0	6.0
Liberal Democrats	Steven Cotterill	140	4.0	0.2
Majority		1,199	34.0	9.9
Turnout		3,517	30.1	−3.8
Labour hold		Swing	0.2	

The incumbent was Sinead Engel for Labour. There was a swing of 0.2% from Conservative to Labour. UKIP was second in 2014 with 27.1% of the vote but did not stand this time so there was a swing of 18.9% from UKIP to Labour which was the biggest swing.

=== Craven ward ===
Craven
Party	Candidate	Votes	%	±%
Conservative	Rebecca Whitaker	2,763	55.1	26.2
Labour	Val Carroll	1,619	32.3	15.6
Green	Caroline Whitaker	377	7.5	−1.3
Liberal Democrats	Bob Jones	248	4.9	1.9
Majority		1,144	22.8	22.8
Turnout		5,007	37.1	−2.3
Conservative hold		Swing	5.3	

The incumbent was Andrew Mallinson for the Conservatives who failed to get reselected by the local Conservative Party. Rebecca Whitaker gained selection instead. Whitaker had previously been a Silsden town councillor. The swing was 5.3% from Labour to Conservative however the 2014 election was complicated by the election of a second councillor at the same time. The councillor which won the second seat was Christopher Atkinson as an independent who failed to be re-elected in 2015. No independent stood this time so the swing expressed between Conservative and Independent would be 23.5% to the Conservatives.

=== Eccleshill ward ===
Eccleshill
Party	Candidate	Votes	%	±%
Liberal Democrats	Geoff Reid*	1,529	44.3	9.3
Labour	Ian Parsons	1,280	37.1	7.0
Conservative	Abdul Qayyum	247	7.2	−4.5
Independent	Terry Pearson	170	4.9	4.9
Yorkshire	Lara Barras	131	3.8	3.8
Green	Sarah Dick	82	2.4	−6.5
Majority		249	7.2	2.3
Turnout		3,439	27.7	−8.8
Liberal Democrats hold		Swing	1.1	

The incumbent was Geoff Reid for the Liberal Democrats. The swing was 1.1% from Labour to Liberal Democrat. The biggest swing was 7.9% from Green to Liberal Democrat.

=== Great Horton ward ===
Great Horton
Party	Candidate	Votes	%	±%
Labour	Joanne Dodds*	3,076	83.5	20.3
Conservative	Hashim Kohan	397	10.8	−2.1
Green	Lesley Hall	121	3.3	3.3
Liberal Democrats	Dorothy Wallace	86	2.3	−0.4
Majority		2,679	72.7	25.8
Turnout		3,680	33.4	−4.8
Labour hold		Swing	11.2	

The incumbent was Joanne Dodds for Labour. There was a swing of 11.2% from Conservative to Labour. UKIP & Respect both stood in 2014 but not this time with 16.3% and 4.6% of the vote respectively. The largest swing therefore was 18.3% from UKIP to Labour.

=== Heaton ward ===
Heaton
Party	Candidate	Votes	%	±%
Labour	Nussrat Mohammed*	2,969	74.1	37.7
Green	Celia Hickson	485	12.1	−6.1
Conservative	Owais Rajput	361	9.0	−4.5
Liberal Democrats	Edward Hallmann	170	4.2	1.6
Majority		2,484	62.0	45.7
Turnout		3,985	34.6	−10.2
Labour hold		Swing	21.9	

Nussrat Mohammed was the incumbent for Labour. There was a swing of 21% from Green to Labour though that could also be expressed as a swing of 29.4% from the Peace party to Labour as The Peace party was second with 21.1% in 2014 but did not stand in 2018. The Peace party candidate in 2014 had been elected as a Labour councillor four years previously.

=== Idle and Thackley ward ===
Idle and Thackley
Party	Candidate	Votes	%	±%
Liberal Democrats	Julie Humphreys	2,327	56.2	−1.3
Labour	Chris Hayden	1,087	26.2	4.4
Conservative	Adnan Sakhawat	435	10.5	−10.1
Yorkshire	Jonathan Barras	180	4.3	4.3
Green	Carl Dunk	106	2.6	2.6
Majority		1,240	29.9	−5.6
Turnout		4,135	32.5	−0.4
Liberal Democrats hold		Swing	-2.8	

The incumbent was Dominic Fear for the Liberal Democrats who stood down at this election. There was a swing of 2.8% from Liberal Democrat to Labour though the largest swing was 7.2% from Conservative to Labour.

=== Ilkley ward ===
Ilkley
Party	Candidate	Votes	%	±%
Conservative	Mike Gibbons*	2,843	49.9	−1.8
Labour	Aidan Higgins	1,556	27.3	2.4
Green	Ros Brown	671	11.8	2.1
Liberal Democrats	Thomas Franks	607	10.7	3.8
Majority		1,287	22.6	−4.2
Turnout		5,677	47.3	2.8
Conservative hold		Swing	-2.1	

The incumbent was Mike Gibbons for the Conservative party. There was a swing of 2.1% from Conservative to Labour. UKIP gained 6.7% in 2014 & did not stand this time so the largest swing was 5.2% from UKIP to Liberal Democrat.

=== Keighley Central ward ===
Keighley Central
Party	Candidate	Votes	%	±%
Labour	Abid Hussain	3,532	76.0	12.5
Conservative	Stephen Butler	715	15.4	1.5
Liberal Democrats	Paul Mann	185	4.0	−0.1
Green	Allan Swales	182	3.9	−0.5
Majority		2,817	60.6	11.0
Turnout		4,614	40.0	−6.0
Labour hold		Swing	5.5	

The incumbent was Abid Hussain for Labour. There was a swing of 5.5% from Conservative to Labour. UKIP did not stand this time but won 13.4% in 2014 so the biggest swing was 13.0% from UKIP to Labour.

=== Keighley East ward ===
Keighley East
Party	Candidate	Votes	%	±%
Labour	Caroline Firth	2,436	55.2	16.3
Conservative	John Kirby	1,525	34.6	14.5
Green	Trudie Jackson	287	6.5	6.5
Liberal Democrats	Glen Cheney	154	3.5	−2.0
Majority		911	20.7	6.4
Turnout		4,402	36.1	−4.0
Labour hold		Swing	-0.9	

The incumbent was Stephen Pullen for Labour who stood down at this election. There was a swing of 0.9% from Labour to Conservative. UKIP did not stand this time but won 24.7% in 2014 so the largest swings were 20.5% from UKIP to Labour & 19.6% from UKIP to Conservative. Respect also did not stand after winning 10.2% in 2014.

=== Keighley West ward ===
Keighley West
Party	Candidate	Votes	%	±%
Labour	Paul Godwin	1,571	48.3	13.2
Conservative	Peter Clarke	1,100	33.8	16.6
Independent	Brian Morris*	401	12.3	12.3
Green	Peter Ferguson	102	3.1	−2.7
Liberal Democrats	Jan Orys	71	2.2	0.4
Majority		471	14.5	9.8
Turnout		3,245	27.9	−3.2
Labour gain from UKIP		Swing	26.5	

Brian Morris was the incumbent, having been elected for UKIP in 2014 and left the party to stand as an independent campaigning for the separation of Keighley, Ilkley & Shipley from Bradford in October 2016. There was no UKIP candidate this time so the swing from UKIP to Labour was 26.5%. If the swing is calculated comparing the vote for Morris as an Independent against the vote for Morris as a UKIP councillor it would be 20.3%.

=== Little Horton ward ===
Little Horton
Party	Candidate	Votes	%	±%
Labour	Fareeda Mir	3,375	84.6	9.7
Conservative	Sakhawat Hussain	280	7.0	3.9
Liberal Democrats	Angharad Griffiths	219	5.5	1.4
Green	Nurjahan Ali Arobi	97	2.4	2.4
Majority		3,095	77.5	19.1
Turnout		3,971	34.6	−3.6
Labour hold		Swing	2.9	

The incumbent was Naveeda Ikram for Labour who resigned from Labour and the council in November 2017. She had been suspended by Labour in October 2015 after being accused of seeking care contracts for Nexus Assist and failing to declare an interest in the firm while a Councillor between November 2014 & August 2015. The jury was discharged for undisclosed reasons in Crown Court in December 2017 and she was acquitted in the Court of Appeal in March 2018. She had been the first British Pakistani woman to be elected to Bradford council in 2004 and the first Muslim woman to be a Lord Mayor in the UK in 2011. There was a 2.9% swing from Conservative to Labour. Respect were second place with 16.4% in 2014 so the largest swing was 13.0% from Respect to Labour.

=== Manningham ward ===
Manningham
Party	Candidate	Votes	%	±%
Labour	Shabir Hussain*	3,609	83.2	21.8
Conservative	Muhammad Hijazi	371	8.6	6.3
Green	Bruce Barnes	251	5.8	2.5
Liberal Democrats	Abid Iqbal	87	2.0	0.3
Majority		3,238	74.6	44.1
Turnout		4,318	37.3	−8.8
Labour hold		Swing	7.8	

The incumbent was Shabir Hussain for Labour. There was a 7.8% swing from Conservative to Labour. In 2014 the second place party was Respect with 30.8% of the vote though they did not stand this time. The largest swing therefore was 26.3% from Respect to Labour.

=== Queensbury ward ===
Queensbury
Party	Candidate	Votes	%	±%
Conservative	Robert Hargreaves	1,326	38.7	26.0
Labour	Alex Mitchell	921	26.9	10.6
The Queensbury Ward Independents	Paul Cromie*	773	22.5	−13.2
UKIP	Kathryn Illingworth	177	5.2	−27.6
Liberal Democrats	Tom Molloy	116	3.4	1.1
Green	Eithne Dodwell	111	3.2	3.2
Majority		405	11.8	8.8
Turnout		3,424	27.4	−4.7
Conservative gain from The Queensbury Ward Independents		Swing	19.6	

The incumbent was Paul Cromie for the Queensbury Ward Independents. He won the seat for the BNP in 2006 and split from the BNP with his wife in 2011 forming the Queensbury Ward Independents. Cromie was re-elected under the Queensbury Ward Independent banner in 2014 but in 2018 he did not campaign with no leafleting or canvassing. Cromie later said he stood for re-election to keep people happy but he wanted to retire. There was a swing of 19.6% from Queensbury Ward Independents to Conservative but the biggest swing was 26.8% from UKIP to Conservative. Between Conservative & Labour the swing was 7.7% from Labour to Conservative.

=== Royds ward ===
Royds
Party	Candidate	Votes	%	±%
Labour	Ruth Wood	1,392	46.9	6.4
Conservative	David Servant	705	23.8	10.2
UKIP	Jason Smith	582	19.6	−16.3
Liberal Democrats	Shauna Devonshire	112	3.8	−1.4
Green	Michael Stanlick	99	3.3	3.3
Libertarian Party	Joshua Bastow	69	2.3	2.3
Majority		687	23.2	18.6
Turnout		2,959	24.2	−4.4
Labour hold		Swing	1.9	

The incumbent was Valerie Slater for Labour. Slater stood down at this election having been the Deputy Council Leader & Deputy Leader of the Bradford Labour Group. Slater had been Councillor for Royds since 2004. There was a swing of 1.9% from Conservative to Labour. The largest swing was 11.4% from UKIP to Labour.

=== Shipley ward ===
Shipley
Party	Candidate	Votes	%	±%
Labour	Vick Jenkins	2,530	47.1	24.7
Green	Hawarun Hussain*	1,833	34.1	−9.5
Conservative	Falak Ahmed	823	15.3	−1.9
Liberal Democrats	Caroline Jones	173	3.2	0.7
Majority		697	13.0	
Turnout		5,359	46.2	5.0
Labour gain from Green		Swing	17.1	

The incumbent was Hawarun Hussain for the Green Party. Hussain had been a Councillor for Shipley since 2004. There was a swing of 17.1% from Green to Labour. UKIP did not stand this time having got almost 14% in 2014 so the biggest swing was 19.3% from UKIP to Labour.

=== Thornton and Allerton ward ===
Thornton and Allerton
Party	Candidate	Votes	%	±%
Labour	Richard Dunbar*	2,363	58.4	12.9
Conservative	David Chapman	1,290	31.9	−12.3
UKIP	Alec Suchi	172	4.3	4.3
Green	Norma Russell	118	2.9	2.9
Liberal Democrats	James Hunt	97	2.4	−5.4
Majority		1,073	26.5	25.2
Turnout		4,040	33.0	−0.1
Labour hold		Swing	12.6	

The incumbent was Richard Dunbar for Labour. There was a swing of 12.6% from Conservative to Labour.

=== Toller ward ===
Toller
Party	Candidate	Votes	%	±%
Labour	Kamran Hussain	4,177	73.0	−7.3
Conservative	Amir Hussain	1,265	22.1	18.7
Green	Sean Dobiech	154	2.7	−0.8
Liberal Democrats	Amjad Ali	109	1.9	0.4
Majority		2,912	50.9	−18.5
Turnout		5,705	46.1	−4.8
Labour hold		Swing	-13.0	

The incumbent was Imran Hussain who stood down as a Councillor at this election having been both Councillor and MP since his election as MP for Bradford East in 2015. There was a 13.0% swing from Labour to Conservative. Respect were second in 2014 with almost 11% of the vote so the biggest swing was 14.8% from Respect to Conservative.

=== Tong ward ===
Tong
Party	Candidate	Votes	%	±%
Labour	Alan Wainwright*	1,285	51.2	8.7
Conservative	Edward Ward	507	20.2	7.7
Green	Matt Edwards	370	14.7	14.7
UKIP	Lincoln Stead	253	10.1	−24.6
Liberal Democrats	Ian Vipond	87	3.5	−2.4
Majority		778	31.0	23.2
Turnout		2,502	20.1	−3.4
Labour hold		Swing	0.5	

The incumbent was Alan Wainwright for Labour. There was a swing of 0.5% from Labour to Conservative, both parties benefited from significant swings from UKIP, 16.7% to Labour & 16.2% to Conservative. The biggest swing was 19.7% from UKIP to Green.

=== Wharfedale ward ===
Wharfedale
Party	Candidate	Votes	%	±%
Conservative	Gerry Barker*	2,343	51.6	9.4
Labour	Niccola Swan	1,424	31.3	13.4
Liberal Democrats	Jamie Needle	512	11.3	5.9
Green	Chris Turner	259	5.7	−3.8
Majority		919	20.2	2.7
Turnout		4,538	47.9	3.9
Conservative hold		Swing	-2.0	

The swing was 2.0% from Conservative to Labour. Gerry Barker for Conservative was the incumbent. An independent was second with 24.7% in 2014 so there was a swing of 17.% from Independent to Conservative & the biggest swing was 19.1% from Independent to Labour.

=== Wibsey ward ===
Wibsey
Party	Candidate	Votes	%	±%
Labour	Sabiya Khan	1,483	47.8	6.1
Conservative	Richard Sheard	818	26.4	12.2
UKIP	Jamie Illingworth	513	16.5	−22.0
Liberal Democrats	Brian Boulton	187	6.0	0.6
Green	Dave Stevens	95	3.1	3.1
Majority		665	21.4	18.2
Turnout		3,096	28.9	−4.4
Labour hold		Swing	14.0	

There was a swing of 14.0% from UKIP to Labour as UKIP was second in 2014. There was a swing of 3.0% from Labour to Conservative and the biggest swing was 17.1% from UKIP to Conservative. Lynne Eleanor Smith won the ward for Labour in 2014 but she died in May 2016. Joanne Lisa Sharp won the ward for Labour in the subsequent by-election and was thus the incumbent.

=== Windhill and Wrose ward ===
Windhill and Wrose
Party	Candidate	Votes	%	±%
Labour	Vanda Greenwood*	2,063	59.3	12.2
Conservative	Stephen Williams	964	27.7	15.5
Liberal Democrats	Gillian Thorne	227	6.5	−0.9
Green	Helen Love	212	6.1	1.7
Majority		1,099	31.6	13.0
Turnout		3,466	30	
Labour hold		Swing	-1.6	

The incumbent was Vanda Greenwood for Labour. There was a swing of 1.6% from Labour to Conservative. UKIP was second in 2014 with 28.5% so the swing was 20.4% from UKIP to Labour & the biggest swing was 22.0% from UKIP to Conservative.

=== Worth Valley ward ===
Worth Valley
Party	Candidate	Votes	%	±%
Conservative	Chris Herd	2,313	56.2	22.0
Labour	Mark Curtis	1,472	35.8	9.4
Green	Janet Russell	194	4.7	−3.0
Liberal Democrats	Kay Kirkham	122	3.0	0.4
Majority		841	20.4	15.1
Turnout		4,101	37.6	−0.2
Conservative hold		Swing	6.3	

The incumbent was Glenn William Miller for the Conservatives who failed to gain reselection by the local Conservative party. The swing was 6.3% from Labour to Conservative. UKIP were second with 28.9% in 2014 but did not stand this time so the biggest swing was 25.5% from UKIP to Conservative.

=== Wyke ward ===
Wyke
Party	Candidate	Votes	%	±%
Labour	David Warburton*	1,451	49.1	8.5
Conservative	Francesca Stefanyszyn	900	30.5	14.7
British Democrats	James Lewthwaite	161	5.5	5.5
Democrats and Veterans	Stephen Crosby	135	4.6	4.6
UKIP	John Worsley	124	4.2	−32.8
Liberal Democrats	Kevin Hall	103	3.5	0.7
Green	Darren Parkinson	75	2.5	2.5
Majority		551	18.7	15.0
Turnout		2,949	27.1	−4.9
Labour hold		Swing	-3.1	

David Warburton for Labour was the incumbent. There was a 3.1% swing from Labour to Conservative. UKIP were second in 2014 with 32.8% so the swing was 20.6% from UKIP to Labour and the biggest swing was 23.7% from UKIP to Conservative.

== See also ==
- Bradford local elections
