= Wharfedale (ward) =

Electoral ward in West Yorkshire, England

Coordinates: 53.90091°N 1.75037°W

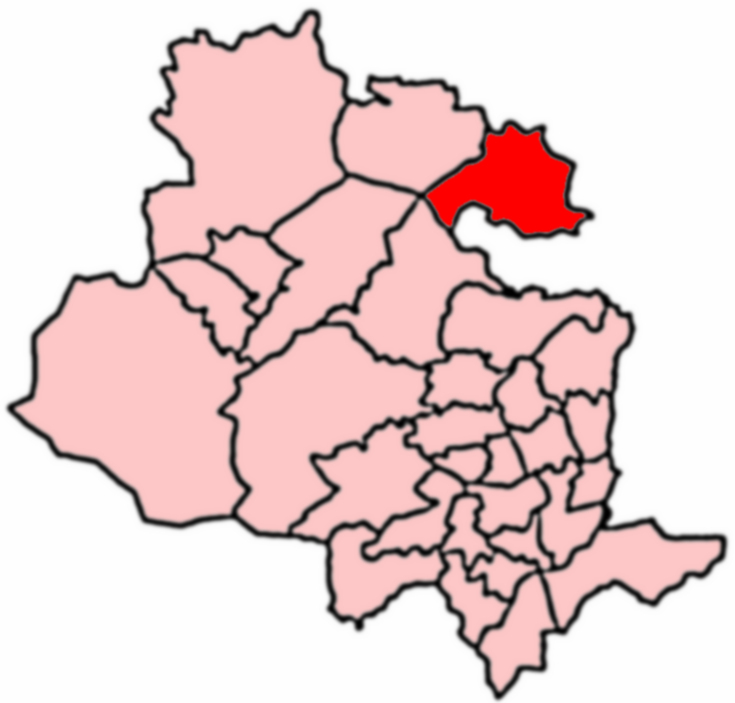
- 2004 Boundaries of Wharfedale Ward
- Population: 11,836 2011 Census
- OS grid reference: SE165450
- Metropolitan borough: City of Bradford
- Metropolitan county: West Yorkshire
- Region: Yorkshire and the Humber
- Country: England
- Sovereign state: United Kingdom
- Post town: Ilkley
- Postcode district: LS29
- Dialling code: 01943
- Police: West Yorkshire
- Fire: West Yorkshire
- Ambulance: Yorkshire
- UK Parliament: Shipley
- Councillors: Gerald Barker (Conservative); Chris Steele (Labour); Bob Felstead (Conservative)

Wharfedale is a ward located in the northeast of the City of Bradford Metropolitan District Council in West Yorkshire, England. It is situated within the Wharfedale valley (from which the ward gets its name), one of the Yorkshire Dales. The ward comprises the settlements of Burley-in-Wharfedale, Burley Woodhead and Menston, as well as the surrounding moorland. According to the 2011 census, the population of the ward was 11,836.

== Councillors ==
Wharfedale ward is represented on Bradford Council by Conservative councillors Gerald Barker and Bob Felstead, and Labour councillor Chris Steele.

| Election | Councillor | Councillor | Councillor |
|---|---|---|---|
| 2004 | Christopher Ian Greaves (Con) | Matthew James Steven Palmer (Con) | Dale Smith (Con) |
| 2006 | Chris Greaves (Con) | Matt Palmer (Con) | Dale Smith (Con) |
| 2007 | Chris Greaves (Con) | Matt Palmer (Con) | Dale Smith (Con) |
| 2008 | Chris Greaves (Con) | Matt Palmer (Con) | Dale Smith (Con) |
| 2010 | Chris Greaves (Con) | Matt Palmer (Con) | Dale Smith (Con) |
| 2011 | Chris Greaves (Con) | Matt Palmer (Con) | Dale Smith (Con) |
| February 2012 | Chris Greaves (Independent) | Matt Palmer (Con) | Dale Smith (Con) |
| May 2012 | Chris Greaves (Independent) | Matt Palmer (Con) | Dale Smith (Con) |
| By-election; 15 November 2012 | Chris Greaves (Independent) | Jackie Whiteley (Con) | Dale Smith (Con) |
| 2014 | Gerald Anthony Granville Barker (Con) | Jackie Whiteley (Con) | Dale Smith (Con) |
| 2015 | Gerald Barker (Con) | Jackie Whiteley (Con) | Dale Smith (Con) |
| 2016 | Gerald Barker (Con) | Jackie Whiteley (Con) | Dale Smith (Con) |
| 2018 | Gerald Barker (Con) | Jackie Whiteley (Con) | Dale Smith (Con) |
| 2019 | Gerald Barker (Con) | Jackie Whiteley (Con) | Dale Smith (Con) |
| 2021 | Gerald Barker (Con) | Bob Feltstead (Con) | Dale Smith (Con) |
| 2022 | Gerald Barker (Con) | Bob Feltstead (Con) | Dale Smith (Con) |
| 2023 | Gerald Barker (Con) | Chris Steele (Lab) | Dale Smith (Con) |
| 2024 | Gerald Barker (Con) | Chris Steele (Lab) | Bob Feltstead (Con) |
| 2026 | Bob Felstead (Con) | Lottie Kitching (Green) | Peter Sidney Cochrane (Con) |

indicates seat up for re-election. indicates councillor defection. indicates a by-election.
