= 2007 City of Bradford Metropolitan District Council election =

2007 UK local government election

The 2007 City of Bradford Metropolitan District Council elections took place on 3 May 2007.

== Ward results ==
An asterisk denotes an incumbent

=== Baildon ward ===
Baildon
Party	Candidate	Votes	%	±%
Conservative	Roger L'Amie	2,245	41.8	
Liberal Democrats	Sara Clarke	2,007	37.4	
Labour	Eleanor Kilyon	469	8.7	
BNP	Eric Baxendale	388	7.2	
Green	Robert Nicholls	256	4.8	
Majority		238	4.4	
Turnout		5,365	46.14	
Conservative gain from Liberal Democrats		Swing		

=== Bingley ward ===
Bingley
Party	Candidate	Votes	%	±%
Conservative	Robin Ernest Owens	2,961	53.1	
Labour	Robert Beckwith	1,228	22.0	
Green	Arthur Arnold	588	10.5	
Liberal Democrats	Susan Whelan	468	8.4	
UKIP	James Beech	212	3.8	
Anti-Crime Party	Norman Scarth	120	2.2	
Majority		1,733	31.1	
Turnout		5,577	43.86	
Conservative hold		Swing		

=== Bingley Rural ward ===
Bingley Rural
Party	Candidate	Votes	%	±%
Conservative	Andrew Cooke	3,070	55.3	
Labour	James Newton	835	15.0	
BNP	Rita Cromie	647	11.7	
Liberal Democrats	Alan Sykes	467	8.4	
Green	Brian Newham	337	6.1	
UKIP	Jason Smith	195	3.5	
Majority		2,235	40.3	
Turnout		5,551	41.69	
Conservative hold		Swing		

=== Bolton & Undercliffe ward ===
Bolton and Undercliffe
Party	Candidate	Votes	%	±%
Liberal Democrats	Howard Middleton*	2,050		
Liberal Democrats	Margaret Chadwick	1,835		
Labour	Ronnie Fieldhouse	919		
Labour	Sinead Engel	860		
Conservative	Ryan Atkinson	650		
Conservative	John Wills	545		
Green	Steve Schofield	327		
Majority				
Turnout		3,932	35.98	
Liberal Democrats hold		Swing		
Liberal Democrats hold		Swing		

=== Bowling & Barkerend ward ===
Bowling and Barkerend
Party	Candidate	Votes	%	±%
Conservative	Mohammed Jamil*	2,094	46.3	
Labour	Ray Bage	1,355	30.0	
Liberal Democrats	Tracey Leeming	986	21.8	
Independent	Muhammad Shakeel	87	1.9	
Majority		739	16.3	
Turnout		4,522	39.12	
Conservative hold		Swing		

=== Bradford Moor ward ===
Bradford Moor
Party	Candidate	Votes	%	±%
Labour	Ghazanfer Khaliq*	2,210	39.7	
Conservative	Azhar Mahmood	1,876	33.7	
Liberal Democrats	Zubair Hussain	1,476	26.5	
Majority		334	6.0	
Turnout		5,562	48.64	
Labour hold		Swing		

=== City ward ===
City
Party	Candidate	Votes	%	±%
Labour	Shakeela Jan Lal	2,321	54.2	
Conservative	Waheed Ali	1,089	25.4	
Respect	Nadia Macgranthin	369	8.6	
Liberal Democrats	Chris Reid	292	6.8	
Green	Derek Curtis	210	4.9	
Majority		1,232	28.8	
Turnout		4,281	40.07	
Labour gain from Conservative		Swing		

=== Clayton & Fairweather Green ward ===
Clayton & Fairweather Green
Party	Candidate	Votes	%	±%
Labour	Peter Longthorn	1,523	34.1	
Conservative	Charles Malcolm Sykes*	1,372	30.7	
BNP	Kim Riach	960	21.5	
Liberal Democrats	Lorna Leeming	610	13.7	
Majority		151	3.4	
Turnout		4,465	41.94	
Labour gain from Conservative		Swing		

=== Craven ward ===
Craven
Party	Candidate	Votes	%	±%
Conservative	Michael John Kelly*	2,434	51.4	
Labour	J. Alan Edwards	1,099	23.2	
Liberal Democrats	Angela Pearson	580	12.3	
Independent	Ian Bannister	376	7.9	
Green	Valerie Harris	245	5.2	
Majority		1,335	28.2	
Turnout		4,734	38.80	
Conservative hold		Swing		

=== Eccleshill ward ===
Eccleshill
Party	Candidate	Votes	%	±%
Liberal Democrats	Carol Beardmore*	1,959	44.4	
BNP	Jenny Sampson	1,032	23.4	
Labour	Tony Niland	811	18.4	
Conservative	David Chapman	491	11.1	
UKIP	Mel Rhodes	116	2.6	
Majority		927	21	
Turnout		4,409	38.69	
Liberal Democrats hold		Swing		

=== Great Horton ward ===
Great Horton
Party	Candidate	Votes	%	±%
Labour	John Derek Godward*	1,698	38.1	
Liberal Democrats	Rafiq M. Sehgal	1,396	31.3	
Conservative	Richard Milczanowski	1,005	22.6	
BNP	Sharif Gawad	356	8.0	
Majority		302	6.8	
Turnout		4,455	40.76	
Labour hold		Swing		

=== Heaton ward ===
Heaton
Party	Candidate	Votes	%	±%
Labour	Rizman Malik	1,985	39.1	
Green	David Michael Ford*	1,519	29.9	
Conservative	Elizabeth Hellmich	1,201	23.6	
Liberal Democrats	Helen Wright	377	7.4	
Majority		466	9.2	
Turnout		5,082	50.12	
Labour gain from Green		Swing		

=== Idle & Thackley ward ===
Idle and Thackley
Party	Candidate	Votes	%	±%
Liberal Democrats	Jeanette Sunderland*	2,681	58.8	
Conservative	Edward Ward	795	17.4	
Labour	Rosie Watson	563	12.4	
BNP	Patricia Boyle	518	11.4	
Majority		1,886	41.4	
Turnout		4,557	39.10	
Liberal Democrats hold		Swing		

=== Ilkley ward ===
Ilkley
Party	Candidate	Votes	%	±%
Conservative	Brian Martin Smith*	2,967	58.7	
Labour	Andrew Dundas	1,068	21.1	
Liberal Democrats	Barbara Pierscionek	622	12.3	
Green	Betts Fetherston	397	7.9	
Majority		1,899	37.6	
Turnout		5,054	45.01	
Conservative hold		Swing		

=== Keighley Central ward ===
Labour incumbent Lynne Joyce was controversially dropped by the party for this election in favour of Mark Taylor.

Keighley Central
Party	Candidate	Votes	%	±%
Conservative	Zafar Ali	2,886	54.2	
Labour	Mark Taylor	1,826	34.3	
Liberal Democrats	Roger Beaumont	611	11.5	
Majority		1,060	19.9	
Turnout		5,323	49.40	
Conservative gain from Labour		Swing		

=== Keighley East ward ===
Keighley East
Party	Candidate	Votes	%	±%
Labour	Doreen Lee	1,825	37.9	
Conservative	Dorothy Clamp*	1,735	36.1	
BNP	Rose Anne Thompson	630	13.1	
Liberal Democrats	Juidith Brooksbank	620	12.9	
Majority		90	1.9	
Turnout		4,810	41.20	
Labour gain from Conservative		Swing		

=== Keighley West ward ===
Keighley West
Party	Candidate	Votes	%	±%
Labour	Sandra Haigh	1,662	40.9	
Conservative	William Root	860	21.2	
BNP	Peter Clarke	740	18.2	
Independent	Brian Hudson	570	14.0	
Liberal Democrats	Maralyn Adey	230	5.7	
Majority		802	19.7	
Turnout		4,062	36.80	
Labour hold		Swing		

=== Little Horton ward ===
Little Horton
Party	Candidate	Votes	%	±%
Labour	Sher Khan*	2,326	59.3	
Conservative	Mohammed Najeeb	593	15.1	
Liberal Democrats	John Massen	559	14.3	
Respect	Farhan Ali	443	11.3	
Majority		1,733	44.2	
Turnout		3,921	37.99	
Labour hold		Swing		

=== Manningham ward ===
Manningham
Party	Candidate	Votes	%	±%
Liberal Democrats	Quasim Khan	3,052	53.5	
Labour	Choudhary Rangzeb*	1,830	32.1	
Respect	Arshad Ali	385	6.8	
Green	John Robinson	259	4.5	
Conservative	Ishrat Bukhari	175	3.1	
Majority		1,222	21.4	
Turnout		5,701	53.55	
Liberal Democrats gain from Labour		Swing		

=== Queensbury ward ===
Queensbury
Party	Candidate	Votes	%	±%
BNP	Lynda Cromie	1,718	36.6	
Conservative	Stuart Hanson*	1,563	33.3	
Labour	Graham Mahony	957	20.4	
Liberal Democrats	Antony Habergham	455	9.7	
Majority		155	3.3	
Turnout		4,693	41.59	
BNP gain from Conservative		Swing		

=== Royds ward ===
Royds
Party	Candidate	Votes	%	±%
Labour	Gill Thornton	1,567	39.4	
BNP	James Lewthwaite	1,291	32.5	
Conservative	Derek Green	751	18.9	
Liberal Democrats	Edward Hallman	366	9.2	
Majority		276	6.9	
Turnout		3,975	34.78	
Labour hold		Swing		

=== Shipley ward ===
Shipley
Party	Candidate	Votes	%	±%
Green	Kevin Robert Warnes*	2,162	43.9	
Conservative	Derek Taylor	1,215	24.7	
Labour	Kevin Armstrong	810	16.5	
BNP	Laura Beadsworth	354	7.2	
Liberal Democrats	John Hall	292	5.9	
UKIP	Philip Bird	91	1.8	
Majority		947	19.2	
Turnout		4,924	46.07	
Green hold		Swing		

=== Thornton & Allerton ward ===
Thornton and Allerton
Party	Candidate	Votes	%	±%
Conservative	Michael Evan McCabe*	1,696	40.0	
BNP	Clifford Cockayne	1,011	23.9	
Labour	Mark Blackburn	960	22.7	
Liberal Democrats	Ruth Weston	501	11.8	
Blahl Party	Carl Finlan	69	1.6	
Majority		685	16.2	
Turnout		4,237	37.60	
Conservative hold		Swing		

=== Toller ward ===
Toller
Party	Candidate	Votes	%	±%
Labour	Amir Hussain*	2,639	46.3	
Conservative	Amjad Hussain	2,471	43.3	
Liberal Democrats	Owen Griffiths	595	10.4	
Majority		168	2.9	
Turnout		5,705	49.63	
Labour hold		Swing		

=== Tong ward ===
Tong
Party	Candidate	Votes	%	±%
Labour	John Ruding*	1,515	46.7	
BNP	Leslie Nakonecznyi	704	21.7	
Conservatives: Stop The Hospital Cuts	Simon Buckingham	559	17.2	
Liberal Democrats	Susan Fletcher	306	9.4	
UKIP	Peter Brear	159	4.9	
Majority		811	25.0	
Turnout		3,243	28.30	
Labour hold		Swing		

=== Wharfedale ward ===
Wharfedale
Party	Candidate	Votes	%	±%
Conservative	Matthew James Steven Palmer*	2,602	66.2	
Liberal Democrats	Vernon Whelan	805	20.5	
Labour	Lorraine Kirkwood	522	13.3	
Majority		1,797	45.7	
Turnout		3,929	42.99	
Conservative hold		Swing		

=== Wibsey ward ===
Wibsey
Party	Candidate	Votes	%	±%
Labour	Ralph David Ritchie Berry*	1,546	38.1	
BNP	Andrew Clarke	1,128	27.8	
Conservative	Richard Sheard	821	20.3	
Liberal Democrats	Brian Boulton	558	13.8	
Majority		418	10.3	
Turnout		4,053	38.89	
Labour hold		Swing		

=== Windhill & Wrose ward ===
Windhill and Wrose
Party	Candidate	Votes	%	±%
Liberal Democrats	John Watmough	1,520	33.1	
Labour	Susan Hinchcliffe	1,374	29.9	
BNP	Neil Craig	784	17.0	
Conservative	Andrew Rowley	748	16.3	
Green	Linda Arnold	100	2.2	
Independent	Michael Breen	73	1.6	
Majority		146	3.2	
Turnout		4,599	41.94	
Liberal Democrats gain from Labour		Swing		

=== Worth Valley ward ===
Worth Valley
Party	Candidate	Votes	%	±%
Conservative	Peter Henry Hill*	1,919	43.2	
Labour	Keith Dredge	1,376	31.0	
BNP	John Joy	766	17.2	
Liberal Democrats	Jack Taylor	382	8.6	
Majority		543	12.2	
Turnout		4,443	42.35	
Conservative hold		Swing		

=== Wyke ward ===
Wyke
Party	Candidate	Votes	%	±%
Labour	Sarah Ferriby	1,416	35.8	
BNP	Robert Manby	1,103	27.9	
Conservative	John Stead	1,007	25.5	
Liberal Democrats	Kevin Hall	428	10.8	
Majority		313	7.9	
Turnout		3,954	37.88	
Labour gain from BNP		Swing		
