= Windhill and Wrose =

Coordinates: 53°49′54″N 1°45′37″W

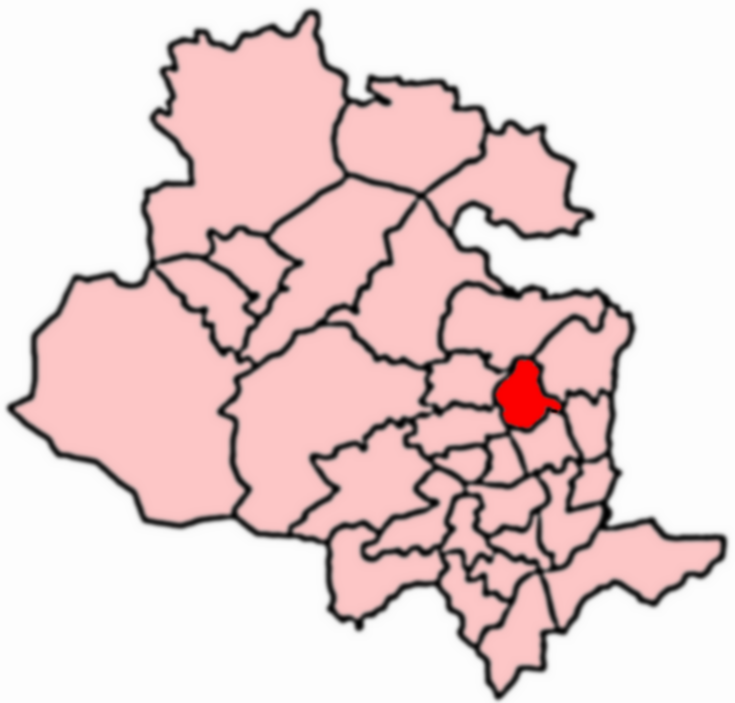
- 2004 boundaries of Windhill and Wrose Ward
- Population: 16,308 (ward. 2011)
- UK Parliament: Shipley
- Councillors: Liz Rowe (Labour); Susan Hinchcliffe (Labour); Alex Ross-Shaw (Labour)

Windhill and Wrose (population 16,408 – 2011 UK census) is a ward within the City of Bradford Metropolitan District Council in the county of West Yorkshire, England, named after the districts of Windhill and Wrose around which it is drawn.

The population in the 2011 census had increased from 14,541 at the census of 2001.

As well as Windhill and Wrose, the ward includes the districts of Owlet, Bolton Woods, West Royd and Wood End.

== Councillors ==
Windhill and Wrose ward is represented on Bradford Council by three Labour councillors, Liz Rowe, Susan Hinchcliffe and Alex Ross-Shaw.

Election	Councillor	Councillor	Councillor
2004	Vanda Greenwood (Lab)	Tony Miller (Lab)	Phillip Thornton (Lab)
2006	Vanda Greenwood (Lab)	Tony Miller (Lab)	Phil Thornton (Lab)
2007	Vanda Greenwood (Lab)	John Watmough (Lib Dem)	Phil Thornton (Lab)
2008	Vanda Greenwood (Lab)	John Watmough (Lib Dem)	John Hall (Lib Dem)
2010	Vanda Greenwood (Lab)	John Watmough (Lib Dem)	John Hall (Lib Dem)
2011	Vanda Greenwood (Lab)	Susan Kathryn Hinchcliffe (Lab)	John Hall (Lib Dem)
2012	Vanda Greenwood (Lab)	Susan Hinchcliffe (Lab)	Alex Ross-Shaw (Lab)
2014	Vanda Greenwood (Lab)	Susan Hinchcliffe (Lab)	Alex Ross-Shaw (Lab)
2015	Vanda Greenwood (Lab)	Susan Hinchcliffe (Lab)	Alex Ross-Shaw (Lab)
2016	Vanda Greenwood (Lab)	Susan Hinchcliffe (Lab)	Alex Ross-Shaw (Lab)
2018	Vanda Greenwood (Lab)	Susan Hinchcliffe (Lab)	Alex Ross-Shaw (Lab)
2019	Vanda Greenwood (Lab)	Susan Hinchcliffe (Lab)	Alex Ross-Shaw (Lab)
2021	Vanda Greenwood (Lab)	Susan Hinchcliffe (Lab)	Alex Ross-Shaw (Lab)
2022	Liz Rowe (Lab)	Susan Hinchcliffe (Lab)	Alex Ross-Shaw (Lab)
2023	Liz Rowe (Lab)	Susan Hinchcliffe (Lab)	Alex Ross-Shaw (Lab)
2024	Liz Rowe (Lab)	Susan Hinchcliffe (Lab)	Alex Ross-Shaw (Lab)

indicates seat up for re-election.

== See also ==
- Listed buildings in Windhill and Wrose
