= 2011 City of Bradford Metropolitan District Council election =

2011 UK local government election

2011 local election results in Bradford

The 2011 City of Bradford Metropolitan District Council election took place on Thursday 5 May 2011.

== Ward results ==
An asterisk denotes an incumbent.

=== Baildon ward ===
Baildon
Party	Candidate	Votes	%	±%
Conservative	Roger L'Amie*	2,820	52.61	+10.77
Labour	Jen Kilyon	1,132	21.12	+12.38
Liberal Democrats	Barney Lerner	969	18.08	−19.33
Green	Helen Broadhead	439	8.19	+3.42
Majority		1,688	31.49	
Turnout		5,387	47.12	+0.99
Conservative hold		Swing		

=== Bingley ward ===
Bingley
Party	Candidate	Votes	%	±%
Conservative	Mark Shaw	3,228	53.08	−0.01
Labour	Andrew Mawson	1,940	31.90	+9.88
Green	Arthur Arnold	612	10.06	−0.48
Liberal Democrats	Vernon Whelan	301	4.95	−3.44
Majority		1,288	21.18	
Turnout		6,117	46.22	+2.36
Conservative hold		Swing		

=== Bingley Rural ward ===
Bingley Rural
Party	Candidate	Votes	%	±%
Conservative	Andrew Cooke*	3,280	58.71	+3.40
Labour	Robert Beckwith	1,456	26.06	+11.02
Green	Brian Newham	428	7.66	−0.05
Liberal Democrats	Alan Sykes	423	7.57	−0.84
Majority		1,824	32.65	
Turnout		5,626	43.06	+1.37
Conservative hold		Swing		

=== Bolton & Undercliffe ward ===
Bolton and Undercliffe
Party	Candidate	Votes	%	±%
Liberal Democrats	Howard Middleton*	1,825	47.28	−9.78
Labour	Gareth Logan	1,536	39.79	+15.04
Conservative	Sadia Waheed	499	12.93	−3.70
Majority		289	7.49	
Turnout		3,914	35.30	−0.68
Liberal Democrats hold		Swing		

=== Bowling & Barkerend ward ===
Bowling and Barkerend
Party	Candidate	Votes	%	±%
Labour	Imran Khan	2,003	43.66	+13.69
Conservative	Mohammed Jamil*	1,433	31.23	−15.07
Liberal Democrats	Tracey Leeming	1,152	25.11	+3.30
Majority		570	12.42	
Turnout		4,636	40.02	+0.90
Labour gain from Conservative		Swing		

=== Bradford Moor ward ===
Bradford Moor
Party	Candidate	Votes	%	±%
Labour	Ghazanfer Khaliq*	2,835	66.58	+26.85
Liberal Democrats	Ali Jamal	1,204	28.28	+1.74
Conservative	Khalid Anjum	219	5.14	−28.59
Majority		1,631	38.30	
Turnout		4,301	37.14	−11.50
Labour hold		Swing		

=== City ward ===
City
Party	Candidate	Votes	%	±%
Labour	Shakeela Lal*	2,875	64.03	+9.81
Conservative	Munir Ahmed	1,242	27.66	+2.22
Green	Derek Curtis	226	5.03	+0.13
Liberal Democrats	Robson Brown	147	3.27	−3.55
Majority		1,633	36.37	
Turnout		4,531	41.55	+1.48
Labour hold		Swing		

=== Clayton & Fairweather Green ward ===
Clayton & Fairweather Green
Party	Candidate	Votes	%	±%
Labour Co-op	Carol Thirkill	2,172	55.52	+21.41
Conservative	David Servant	1,184	30.27	−0.46
Green	Patricia Porter	308	7.87	N/A
Liberal Democrats	Lorna Leeming	248	6.34	−7.32
Majority		988	25.26	
Turnout		3,935	35.80	−6.14
Labour hold		Swing		

=== Craven ward ===
Craven
Party	Candidate	Votes	%	±%
Conservative	Michael Kelly*	3,046	56.48	+5.07
Labour	Peter Cheney	1,491	27.65	+4.43
Liberal Democrats	Gerald Ebden	455	8.44	−3.18
Green	Vanessa Pilny	401	7.44	+2.26
Majority		1,555	28.83	
Turnout		5,429	44.46	+5.66
Conservative hold		Swing		

=== Eccleshill ward ===
Eccleshill
Party	Candidate	Votes	%	±%
Labour	Ruth Billheimer	1,522	43.06	+24.66
Liberal Democrats	Debbie Jessop	1,305	36.92	−7.52
Conservative	Colin McPhee	708	20.03	+8.89
Majority		217	6.14	
Turnout		3,564	32.64	−6.05
Labour gain from Liberal Democrats		Swing		

=== Great Horton ward ===
Great Horton
Party	Candidate	Votes	%	±%
Labour	John Godward*	3,059	75.38	+37.27
Conservative	Qurban Hussain	625	15.40	−7.16
Liberal Democrats	Michael Stelling	374	9.22	−22.12
Majority		2,434	59.98	
Turnout		4,101	36.61	−4.15
Labour hold		Swing		

=== Heaton ward ===
Heaton
Party	Candidate	Votes	%	±%
Labour	Rizwan Malik*	2,516	48.35	+9.29
Conservative	Mohammad Masood	1,370	26.33	+2.69
Green	Sonja McNally	1,114	21.41	−8.48
Liberal Democrats	Lynne Gray	204	3.92	−3.50
Majority		1,146	22.02	
Turnout		5,224	48.16	−1.96
Labour hold		Swing		

=== Idle & Thackley ward ===
Two councillors were elected in this ward, as Cllr. Ed Hall (Liberal Democrats) had resigned, citing personal reasons.

Idle and Thackley
Party	Candidate	Votes	%	±%
Liberal Democrats	Jeanette Sunderland*	2,382	53.03	−5.80
Liberal Democrats	Alun Griffiths	1,858	41.36	−17.47
Labour	Frank Dignan	994	22.13	+9.59
Labour	Yvonne Oliver	958	21.33	+8.97
Conservative	Christopher Clough	947	21.08	+3.64
Conservative	Jackie Whiteley	782	17.41	−0.04
Green	Stuart Winchester	406	9.04	N/A
Majority		864	19.23	
Turnout		4,526	38.23	−0.87
Liberal Democrats hold		Swing		
Liberal Democrats hold		Swing		

=== Ilkley ward ===
Ilkley
Party	Candidate	Votes	%	±%
Conservative	Brian Smith*	3,153	53.39	−5.32
Labour	Neil Fraser	1,625	27.51	+6.38
Liberal Democrats	Samuel Harris	777	13.16	+0.85
UKIP	Paul Latham	351	5.94	N/A
Majority		1,528	25.87	
Turnout		5,949	52.86	+7.85
Conservative hold		Swing		

=== Keighley Central ward ===
Keighley Central
Party	Candidate	Votes	%	±%
Labour	Kaneez Akthar	2,523	43.44	+9.14
Conservative	Zafar Ali*	2,445	42.10	−12.12
Liberal Democrats	Gerald Brooksbank	533	9.18	−2.30
Green	Julian Hughes	307	5.29	N/A
Majority		78	1.34	
Turnout		5,896	51.36	+1.97
Labour gain from Conservative		Swing		

=== Keighley East ward ===
Keighley East
Party	Candidate	Votes	%	±%
Labour	Doreen Lee*	2,452	49.88	+11.94
Conservative	David Harrison	1,779	36.19	+0.12
Liberal Democrats	Judith Brooksbank	432	8.79	−4.10
Green	Celia Hickson	253	5.15	N/A
Majority		673	13.69	
Turnout		4,956	42.65	+1.45
Labour hold		Swing		

=== Keighley West ward ===
Keighley West
Party	Candidate	Votes	%	±%
Labour	Jan Smithies	1,865	50.24	+9.33
Conservative	Christopher Herd	1,617	43.56	+22.39
Liberal Democrats	Fran McAulay	230	6.20	+0.53
Majority		248	6.68	
Turnout		3,753	35.88	−0.92
Labour hold		Swing		

=== Little Horton ward ===
Little Horton
Party	Candidate	Votes	%	±%
Labour	Sher Khan*	3,144	86.78	+27.46
Liberal Democrats	Liam Prentice	287	7.92	−6.33
Conservative	Thomas McMeeking	192	5.30	−9.82
Majority		2,857	78.86	
Turnout		3,658	33.53	−4.47
Labour hold		Swing		

=== Manningham ward ===
Asama Javed defected from Labour to Respect in March 2015.

Manningham
Party	Candidate	Votes	%	±%
Labour	Asama Javed	3,981	73.15	+41.05
Liberal Democrats	Qasim Khan	1,067	19.61	−33.93
Green	John Robinson	243	4.47	−0.08
Conservative	Sharaz Ahmed	151	2.77	−0.29
Majority		2,914	53.55	
Turnout		5,474	49.17	−4.38
Labour gain from Liberal Democrats		Swing		

=== Queensbury ward ===
In June 2011 Lynda Cromie and her husband Paul (also a councillor) left the British National Party citing 'personal reasons'. They now stand as The Queensbury Ward Independents.

Queensbury
Party	Candidate	Votes	%	±%
BNP	Lynda Cromie*	1,461	34.79	−1.82
Conservative	Andrew Smith	1,136	27.05	−6.26
Labour	Rosie Watson	994	23.67	+3.27
UKIP	Jason Smith	412	9.81	N/A
Liberal Democrats	Lisa Clarke	197	4.69	−5.00
Majority		325	7.74	
Turnout		4,217	38.03	−3.56
BNP hold		Swing		

=== Royds ward ===
In 2008, James Lewthwaite stood in this ward as a British National Party candidate.

Royds
Party	Candidate	Votes	%	±%
Labour	Gill Thornton*	1,809	53.66	+14.24
Conservative	Sharon Robertshaw	959	28.45	+9.56
Democratic Nationalists	James Lewthwaite	380	11.27	−21.21
Liberal Democrats	John Bolton	223	6.62	−2.59
Majority		850	25.22	
Turnout		3,402	30.13	−4.64
Labour hold		Swing		

=== Shipley ward ===
Shipley
Party	Candidate	Votes	%	±%
Green	Kevin Warnes*	2,208	42.94	−0.97
Labour	Alex Ross	1,333	25.92	+9.47
Conservative	Andrew Rowley	1,194	23.22	−1.45
UKIP	Philip Bird	219	4.26	+2.41
Liberal Democrats	Russell Halliday	188	3.66	−2.27
Majority		875	17.02	
Turnout		5,162	47.79	+1.71
Green hold		Swing		

=== Thornton & Allerton ward ===
Thornton and Allerton
Party	Candidate	Votes	%	±%
Conservative	Michael McCabe*	1,922	47.37	+7.35
Labour	Mark Blackburn	1,536	37.86	+15.20
Green	Michael Rawnsley	470	11.58	N/A
Liberal Democrats	Shabir Khan	129	3.18	−8.64
Majority		386	9.51	
Turnout		4,083	37.64	+0.04
Conservative hold		Swing		

=== Toller ward ===
Toller
Party	Candidate	Votes	%	±%
Labour	Amir Hussain*	3,978	80.49	+34.24
Conservative	Mahmood Hussain	590	11.94	−31.37
Green	Dawud Islam	262	5.30	N/A
Liberal Democrats	Arif Mehmood	112	2.27	−8.16
Majority		3,388	68.56	
Turnout		4,990	43.55	−6.08
Labour hold		Swing		

=== Tong ward ===
Tong
Party	Candidate	Votes	%	±%
Labour	John Ruding*	1,772	61.23	+14.51
Conservative	Paul Dymond	593	20.49	+3.25
Green	Jason Crowley	187	6.46	N/A
Democratic Nationalists	Liam Haines	174	6.01	N/A
Liberal Democrats	Kirsty Yeadon	168	5.81	−3.63
Majority		1,179	40.74	
Turnout		2,915	24.76	−3.54
Labour hold		Swing		

=== Wharfedale ward ===
Matt Palmer resigned from the Conservative Party to move to Jersey with his family in 2012. The seat was retained for the party by Jackie Whiteley in a by-election 15th November 2012.

Wharfedale
Party	Candidate	Votes	%	±%
Conservative	Matt Palmer*	2,801	59.74	−6.49
Labour	Dave Allen	974	20.77	+7.49
Green	Janet Souyave	502	10.71	N/A
Liberal Democrats	James Main	412	8.79	−11.70
Majority		1,827	38.96	
Turnout		4,713	51.81	+8.82
Conservative hold		Swing		

=== Wibsey ward ===
Wibsey
Party	Candidate	Votes	%	±%
Labour	Ralph Berry*	1,814	52.50	+14.36
Conservative	Richard Sheard	809	23.42	+3.16
UKIP	Jamie Illingworth	363	10.51	N/A
Liberal Democrats	Brian Boulton	243	7.03	−6.73
English Democrat	Andrew Clarke	226	6.54	N/A
Majority		1,005	29.09	
Turnout		3,472	35.12	−3.77
Labour hold		Swing		

=== Windhill & Wrose ward ===
Windhill and Wrose
Party	Candidate	Votes	%	±%
Labour	Susan Hinchcliffe	1,911	46.79	+16.92
Liberal Democrats	John Watmough*	1,328	32.52	−0.53
Conservative	Richard Sibley	591	14.47	−1.79
Green	Helen Love	254	6.22	+4.05
Majority		583	14.28	
Turnout		4,106	38.88	−3.05
Labour gain from Liberal Democrats		Swing		

=== Worth Valley ward ===
Worth Valley
Party	Candidate	Votes	%	±%
Conservative	Rebecca Poulsen	2,062	47.72	+4.53
Labour	Mark Curtis	1,524	35.27	+4.30
Green	Robert Swindells	423	9.79	N/A
Liberal Democrats	Sharon Purvis	312	7.22	−1.38
Majority		538	12.45	
Turnout		4,364	42.38	+0.03
Conservative hold		Swing		

=== Wyke ward ===
Wyke
Party	Candidate	Votes	%	±%
Labour	Sarah Ferriby*	1,962	53.04	+17.23
Conservative	Richard Milczanowski	1,067	28.85	+3.38
Democratic Nationalists	Neil Craig	402	10.87	N/A
Liberal Democrats	Kevin Hall	268	7.25	−3.58
Majority		895	24.20	
Turnout		3,726	37.17	−0.70
Labour hold		Swing		

== By-elections between 2011 and 2012 elections ==
Vote changes correspond to the 2011 Council election.

=== Great Horton ward ===
This was triggered by the resignation of Cllr. Paul Flowers (Labour Party) who stood down after "adult content" was found on a council computer he had used.

Great Horton by-election, 24 November 2011
Party	Candidate	Votes	%	±%
Labour	Abdul Jabar	1,993	58.58	−16.80
Conservative	Mehrban Hussain	705	20.72	+5.32
Liberal Democrats	Mary Slingsby	337	9.91	+0.69
UKIP	Jason Smith	294	8.64	N/A
Green	Celia Hickson	73	2.15	N/A
Majority		1,288	37.86	
Turnout		3,417	27.19	−9.42
Labour hold		Swing		
