= Craven (Bradford ward) =

Coordinates: 53.923°N 1.921°W

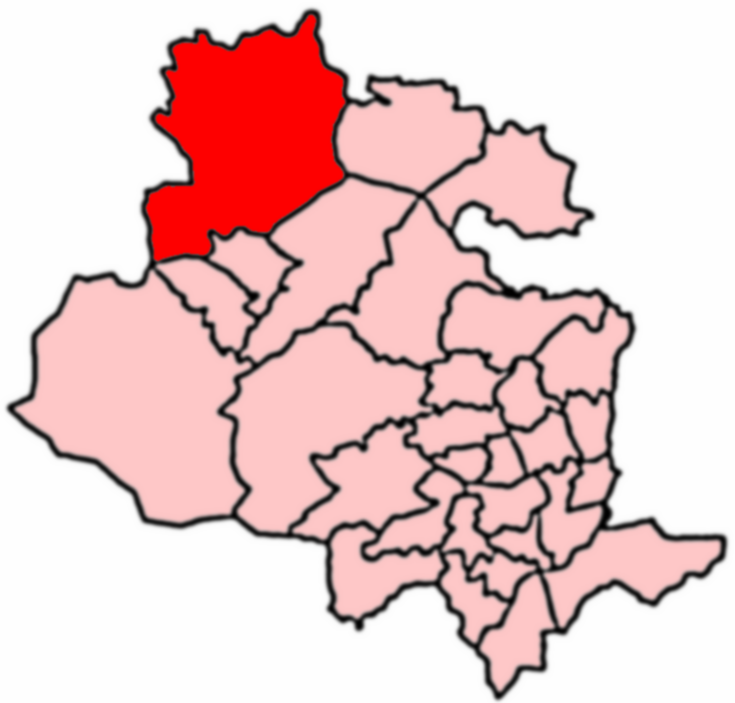
- 2004 Boundaries of Craven Ward
- Population: 16,373 (ward.2011)
- Country: England
- Sovereign state: United Kingdom
- UK Parliament: Keighley
- Councillors: Caroline Whitaker (Green); Janet Russell (Green); Neil Whitaker (Green)

Craven was an electoral ward within the City of Bradford Metropolitan District Council, West Yorkshire, England. The population of the ward at the 2011 Census was 16,373.

It encompassed Eastburn, West Yorkshire and Steeton, West Yorkshire in the south, Silsden in the centre and Addingham in the north, and bordered (on its north side) by North Yorkshire.

Craven Ward was abolished on 6 May 2026.

== Councillors ==
The ward's final Councillors were 3 Green Party councillors, Caroline Whitaker Janet Russell and Neil Whitaker who represented the ward on Bradford Council

Election	Councillor	Councillor	Councillor
2004	Andrew Charles Mallinson (Con)	Michael John Kelly (Con)	David Robert Emmott (Con)
2006	Andrew Mallinson (Con)	Michael Kelly (Con)	David Emmott (Con)
2007	Andrew Mallinson (Con)	Michael Kelly (Con)	David Emmott (Con)
2008	Andrew Mallinson (Con)	Michael Kelly (Con)	Adrian Paul Naylor (Con)
2010	Andrew Mallinson (Con)	Michael Kelly (Con)	Adrian Naylor (Con)
2011	Andrew Mallinson (Con)	Michael Kelly (Con)	Adrian Naylor (Con)
March 2012	Andrew Mallinson (Con)	Michael Kelly (Con)	Adrian Naylor (Independent)
May 2012	Andrew Mallinson (Con)	Michael Kelly (Con)	Adrian Naylor (Independent)
2014	Andrew Mallinson (Con)	Christopher Michael Atkinson (Independent)	Adrian Naylor (Independent)
2015	Andrew Mallinson (Con)	Jack Rickard (Con)	Adrian Naylor (Independent)
2016	Andrew Mallinson (Con)	Jack Rickard (Con)	Adrian Naylor (Independent)
2018	Rebecca Whitaker (Con)	Jack Rickard (Con)	Adrian Naylor (Independent)
2019	Rebecca Whitaker (Con)	Owen Goodall (Con)	Adrian Naylor (Independent)
2021	Rebecca Whitaker (Con)	Owen Goodall (Con)	Peter Clarke (Con)
2022	Caroline Whitaker (Green)	Owen Goodall (Con)	Peter Clarke (Con)
2023	Caroline Whitaker (Green)	Janet Russell (Green)	Peter Clarke (Con)
2024	Caroline Whitaker (Green)	Janet Russell (Green)	Neil Whitaker (Green)

indicates seat up for re-election. indicates councillor defection.
