= Keighley West =

Coordinates: 53.864°N 1.926°W

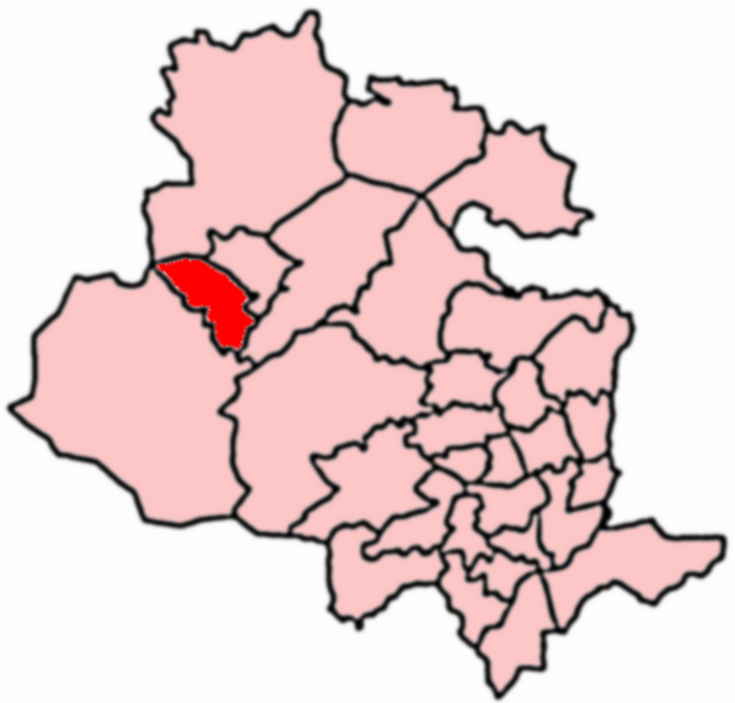
- 2004 Boundaries of Keighley West Ward
- Population: 16,551 (Ward 2011)
- UK Parliament: Keighley
- Councillors: Cath Bacon (Labour); Adrian Farley (Labour); Brian Morris (Independent)

Keighley West (population 15,784 - 2001 UK census) is a ward within the City of Bradford Metropolitan District Council in the county of West Yorkshire, England. The population at the 2011 Census was 16,551.

== Councillors ==
Keighley West ward is represented on Bradford Council by two Labour Party councillors, Cath Bacon and Adrian Farley and an independent councillor Brian Morris.

Election	Councillor	Councillor	Councillor
2004	Catherine Mary Rowen (Lab)	Irene Elison-Wood (Lab)	Angela Clarke (BNP)
2006	Catherine Rowen (Lab)	Irene Elison-Wood (Lab)	Angela Clarke (BNP)
2007	Catherine Rowen (Lab)	Sandra Haigh (Lab)	Angela Clarke (BNP)
2008	Catherine Rowen (Lab)	Sandra Haigh (Lab)	Robert Payne (Con)
2010	Keith Dredge (Lab)	Sandra Haigh (Lab)	Robert Payne (Con)
2011	Keith Dredge (Lab)	Jan Smithies (Lab)	Robert Payne (Con)
2012	Keith Dredge (Lab)	Jan Smithies (Lab)	Adrian Stuart Farley (Lab)
2014	Brian Morris (UKIP)	Jan Smithies (Lab)	Adrian Farley (Lab)
2015	Brian Morris (UKIP)	Cath Bacon (Lab)	Adrian Farley (Lab)
2016	Brian Morris (UKIP)	Cath Bacon (Lab)	Adrian Farley (Lab)
October 2016	Brian Morris (Independent)	Cath Bacon (Lab)	Adrian Farley (Lab)
2018	Election Underway	Cath Bacon (Lab)	Adrian Farley (Lab)

indicates seat up for re-election. indicates councillor defection.
