= Toller =

Ward in Bradford, England

Coordinates: 53.80661°N 1.79193°W

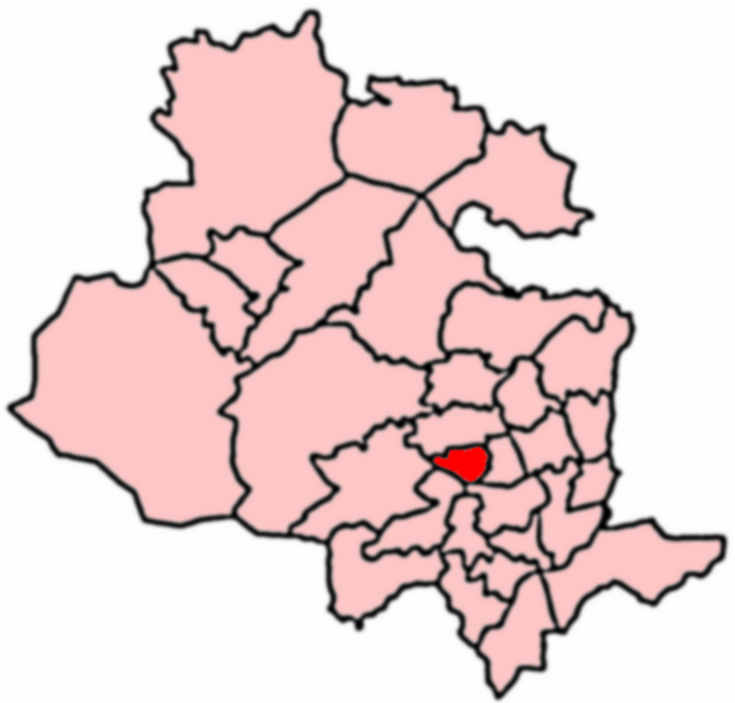
- 2004 Boundaries of Toller Ward

- Location within West Yorkshire
- Population: 21,400 (Toller: Electoral ward of Bradford City Council, 2024)
- OS grid reference: SE138345
- Metropolitan borough: City of Bradford
- Metropolitan county: West Yorkshire
- Region: Yorkshire and the Humber
- Country: England
- Sovereign state: United Kingdom
- Post town: BRADFORD
- Postcode district: BD8, BD9
- Dialling code: 01274
- Police: West Yorkshire
- Fire: West Yorkshire
- Ambulance: Yorkshire
- UK Parliament: Bradford West
- Councillors: Kamran Hussain (Labour); Zohair Kamran ([Your Bradford Independent group]); Arshad Hussain ([Independent])

Toller is a ward within the City of Bradford Metropolitan District Council of West Yorkshire, England. The population of the ward as of the 2011 Census was 19,914, almost 75% of which is British Asian.

== Councillors ==
Toller ward is represented on Bradford Council by three Labour Party councillors, Imran Hussain, Fozia Shaheen, and Arshad Hussain. Councillor Imran Hussain is also Deputy Leader of Bradford Council's Labour Group.

indicates seat up for re-election.

== See also ==
- Listed buildings in Bradford (Toller Ward)
