= 1999 City of Bradford Metropolitan District Council election =

1999 UK local government election

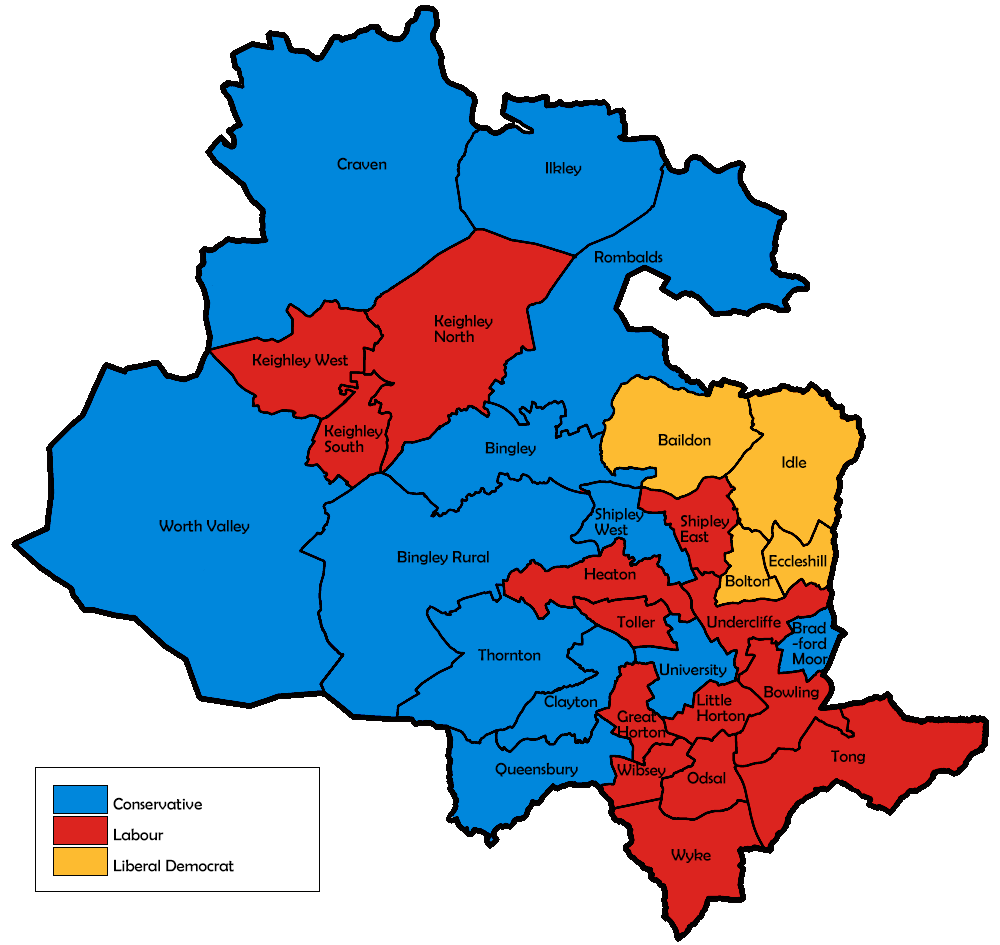
Map of the results for the 1999 Bradford council election.

The 1999 City of Bradford Metropolitan District Council elections were held on Thursday, 6 May 1999, with one third of the council up for election. Since the previous election there had been a by-election resulting in Labour successfully defending their seat in Little Horton. Labour retained control of the council.

== Election results ==
Bradford local election result 1999
Party	Seats	Gains	Losses	Net gain/loss	Seats %	Votes %	Votes	+/−
Labour	14	1	12	▼11	46.7	38.3	40,836	-3.0
Conservative	12	9	1	▲8	40.0	39.7	42,290	+1.1
Liberal Democrats	4	3	0	▲3	13.3	16.8	17,851	+0.4
Green	0	0	0	Steady	0.0	2.6	2,726	+0.5
Independent	0	0	0	Steady	0.0	2.5	2,680	+1.1
Independent Labour	0	0	0	Steady	0.0	0.1	109	+0.1

This result had the following consequences for the total number of seats on the council after the elections:

Party	Previous council	New council
Labour	65	54
Conservative	18	26
Liberal Democrat	7	10
Total	90	90
Working majority	40	18

== Ward results ==
Baildon
Party	Candidate	Votes	%	±%
Liberal Democrats	J. Cole	2,427	54.9	+5.6
Conservative	E. Ward	1,335	30.2	−13.4
Labour	C. Jennings	564	12.8	+5.6
Green	H. Kemp	93	2.1	+2.1
Majority		1,092	24.7	+19.0
Turnout		4,419		
Liberal Democrats hold		Swing	+9.5	

Bingley
Party	Candidate	Votes	%	±%
Conservative	R. Owens	2,159	50.0	+1.9
Labour	J. Flood	1,627	37.7	−4.5
Liberal Democrats	R. Walters	348	8.1	+1.3
Green	M. Thompson	182	4.2	+1.3
Majority		532	12.3	+6.4
Turnout		4,316		
Conservative gain from Labour		Swing	+3.2	

Bingley Rural
Party	Candidate	Votes	%	±%
Conservative	A. Cooke	2,520	62.4	+0.3
Labour	M. Gregory	1,042	25.8	−5.1
Liberal Democrats	T. Mead	370	9.2	+2.2
Green	K. Warnes	105	2.6	+2.6
Majority		1,478	36.6	+5.4
Turnout		4,037		
Conservative hold		Swing	+2.7	

Bolton
Party	Candidate	Votes	%	±%
Liberal Democrats	C. Middleton	1,670	54.0	−2.2
Labour	A. Stone	828	26.7	−0.1
Conservative	V. Binney	597	19.3	+2.3
Majority		842	27.2	−2.1
Turnout		3,095		
Liberal Democrats gain from Labour		Swing	-1.0	

Bowling
Party	Candidate	Votes	%	±%
Labour	M. Ali	1,796	59.3	−0.4
Liberal Democrats	J. Harrington	652	21.5	+6.7
Conservative	H. Rehman	582	19.2	−6.3
Majority		1,144	37.8	+3.7
Turnout		3,030		
Labour hold		Swing	-3.5	

Bradford Moor
Party	Candidate	Votes	%	±%
Conservative	S. Hussain	2,494	57.4	+19.3
Labour	R. Virdee	1,487	34.2	−16.6
Liberal Democrats	E. Hallman	360	8.3	−2.6
Majority		1,007	23.2	+10.5
Turnout		4,341		
Conservative gain from Labour		Swing	+17.9	

Clayton
Party	Candidate	Votes	%	±%
Conservative	E. Byrom	1,628	49.4	+6.2
Labour	Y. Tough	1,207	36.7	−7.8
Liberal Democrats	H. Tooby	367	11.1	−1.2
Green	A. Suchi	90	2.7	+2.7
Majority		421	12.8	+11.6
Turnout		3,292		
Conservative gain from Labour		Swing	+7.0	

Craven
Party	Candidate	Votes	%	±%
Conservative	D. Emmott	1,795	43.5	−7.4
Independent	C. Atkinson	1,009	24.4	+19.0
Labour	F. Harrison	850	20.6	−12.8
Liberal Democrats	H. Hay	473	11.5	+1.1
Majority		786	19.0	+1.5
Turnout		4,127		
Conservative gain from Labour		Swing	-13.2	

Eccleshill
Party	Candidate	Votes	%	±%
Liberal Democrats	M. Attenborough	1,003	38.0	+13.0
Labour	S. Barnbrook	871	33.0	−8.1
Conservative	J. Ryder	766	29.0	−2.5
Majority		132	5.0	−4.6
Turnout		2,640		
Liberal Democrats gain from Labour		Swing	+10.5	

Great Horton
Party	Candidate	Votes	%	±%
Labour	J. Godward	1,492	46.1	−7.3
Conservative	M. Crabtree	1,251	38.7	+4.7
Liberal Democrats	C. Wright	361	11.2	−1.4
Green	M. Islam	129	4.0	+4.0
Majority		241	7.4	−12.0
Turnout		3,233		
Labour hold		Swing	-6.0	

Heaton
Party	Candidate	Votes	%	±%
Labour	G. Seekins	1,907	43.5	+2.9
Conservative	S. Hussain	1,878	42.9	−6.7
Liberal Democrats	L. Howard	597	13.6	+7.8
Majority		29	0.7	−8.3
Turnout		4,382		
Labour hold		Swing	+4.8	

Idle
Party	Candidate	Votes	%	±%
Liberal Democrats	A. Ozolins	1,944	57.1	+0.0
Labour	J. Crewdson	821	24.1	−0.2
Conservative	S. Bowman	639	18.8	+0.2
Majority		1,123	33.0	+0.3
Turnout		3,404		
Liberal Democrats gain from Labour		Swing	-0.1	

Ilkley
Party	Candidate	Votes	%	±%
Conservative	B. Smith	2,355	59.6	−5.9
Labour	P. Cheney	1,023	25.9	+3.2
Liberal Democrats	S. Harris	571	14.5	+2.7
Majority		1,332	33.7	−9.1
Turnout		3,949		
Conservative hold		Swing	-4.5	

Keighley North
Party	Candidate	Votes	%	±%
Labour	M. Slater	2,161	54.8	+4.5
Conservative	M. Startin	1,425	36.1	−2.6
Liberal Democrats	M. Mastrigt	356	9.0	−1.9
Majority		736	18.7	+7.0
Turnout		3,942		
Labour hold		Swing	+3.5	

Keighley South
Party	Candidate	Votes	%	±%
Labour	L. Joyce	1,763	67.5	−0.9
Conservative	W. Redman	575	22.0	+2.1
Liberal Democrats	T. Keeley	274	10.5	−1.1
Majority		1,188	45.5	−3.0
Turnout		2,612		
Labour hold		Swing	-1.5	

Keighley West
Party	Candidate	Votes	%	±%
Labour	B. Thorne	1,716	43.3	−2.9
Conservative	A. Majeed	1,254	31.6	+1.8
Independent	B. Hudson	701	17.7	+3.2
Liberal Democrats	J. Keeley	295	7.4	−2.1
Majority		462	11.6	−4.7
Turnout		3,966		
Labour hold		Swing	-2.3	

Little Horton
Party	Candidate	Votes	%	±%
Labour	I. Greenwood	1,479	59.7	+18.0
Conservative	A. Mahmood	666	26.9	−13.7
Liberal Democrats	S. Lambert	237	9.6	+0.5
Green	K. Spencer	56	2.3	−2.1
Independent	K. Wilson	38	1.5	+1.5
Majority		813	32.8	+31.8
Turnout		2,476		
Labour hold		Swing	+15.8	

Odsal
Party	Candidate	Votes	%	±%
Labour	D. Green	1,641	51.6	−4.8
Conservative	J. Robertshaw	1,074	33.8	+4.4
Liberal Democrats	B. Boulton	463	14.6	+0.4
Majority		567	17.8	−9.2
Turnout		3,178		
Labour hold		Swing	-4.6	

Queensbury
Party	Candidate	Votes	%	±%
Conservative	A. Smith	1,621	48.6	+5.3
Labour	A. Pitts	1,262	37.8	−7.0
Liberal Democrats	A. Cruden	342	10.3	−1.6
Independent Labour	G. Riseborough	109	3.3	+3.3
Majority		359	10.8	+9.2
Turnout		3,334		
Conservative gain from Labour		Swing	+6.1	

Rombalds
Party	Candidate	Votes	%	±%
Conservative	R. Wightman	2,373	54.3	+5.3
Labour	A. Benjamin	1,044	23.9	−5.0
Liberal Democrats	J. Hall	952	21.8	−0.3
Majority		1,329	30.4	+10.3
Turnout		4,369		
Conservative hold		Swing	+5.1	

Shipley East
Party	Candidate	Votes	%	±%
Labour	M. Blackburn	1,256	52.9	−5.5
Conservative	C. Wyatt-Millington	505	21.3	+1.6
Liberal Democrats	M. Pollard	494	20.8	+3.3
Green	M. Love	118	5.0	+0.7
Majority		751	31.6	−7.1
Turnout		2,373		
Labour hold		Swing	-3.5	

Shipley West
Party	Candidate	Votes	%	±%
Conservative	D. Herdson	1,585	33.6	−3.7
Labour	F. Dale	1,455	30.8	−4.7
Green	D. Ford	1,402	29.7	+8.6
Liberal Democrats	B. Moore	279	5.9	−0.1
Majority		130	2.7	+1.0
Turnout		4,721		
Conservative gain from Labour		Swing	+0.5	

Thornton
Party	Candidate	Votes	%	±%
Conservative	J. Buffham	1,656	57.6	+9.9
Labour	I. Bowmaker	826	28.7	−1.1
Liberal Democrats	A. Griffiths	302	10.5	−8.3
Green	M. Rawnsley	91	3.2	−0.5
Majority		830	28.9	+11.0
Turnout		2,875		
Conservative gain from Labour		Swing	+5.5	

Toller
Party	Candidate	Votes	%	±%
Labour	A. Hussain	2,780	48.7	+9.3
Conservative	A. Hussain	2,450	42.9	−6.3
Liberal Democrats	I. Inness	481	8.4	−0.4
Majority		330	5.8	−4.0
Turnout		5,711		
Labour gain from Conservative		Swing	+7.8	

Tong
Party	Candidate	Votes	%	±%
Labour	M. Johnson	1,041	61.4	−5.2
Conservative	D. Manogue	400	23.6	+10.1
Liberal Democrats	J. Massen	254	15.0	−4.9
Majority		641	37.8	−9.0
Turnout		1,695		
Labour hold		Swing	-7.6	

Undercliffe
Party	Candidate	Votes	%	±%
Labour	E. McNally	1,293	46.4	−5.2
Conservative	M. Looby	870	31.2	−0.1
Liberal Democrats	J. Mangeolles	460	16.5	−0.6
Green	S. Scofield	166	5.9	+5.9
Majority		423	15.2	−5.1
Turnout		2,789		
Labour hold		Swing	-2.5	

University
Party	Candidate	Votes	%	±%
Conservative	M. Hussain	2,479	47.0	+24.6
Labour	C. Rangzeb	2,143	40.6	−19.0
Green	J. Robinson	294	5.6	−2.7
Liberal Democrats	H. Wright	263	5.0	+0.2
Independent	S. Shah	100	1.9	+1.9
Majority		336	6.4	−30.9
Turnout		5,279		
Conservative gain from Labour		Swing	+21.8	

Wibsey
Party	Candidate	Votes	%	±%
Labour	R. Berry	1,392	49.3	−7.2
Conservative	R. Sheard	1,045	37.0	+5.6
Liberal Democrats	S. Devonshire	385	13.6	+1.6
Majority		347	12.3	−12.8
Turnout		2,822		
Labour hold		Swing	-6.4	

Worth Valley
Party	Candidate	Votes	%	±%
Conservative	G. Miller	1,364	37.3	−4.0
Labour	M. Young	1,020	27.9	−3.9
Independent	D. Samuels	832	22.8	+3.6
Liberal Democrats	S. Hutton	439	12.0	+4.3
Majority		344	9.4	−0.1
Turnout		3,655		
Conservative gain from Labour		Swing	-0.0	

Wyke
Party	Candidate	Votes	%	±%
Labour	P. Longthorn	1,049	43.2	−4.6
Conservative	R. Reynolds	949	39.0	+5.3
Liberal Democrats	K. Hall	432	17.8	−0.7
Majority		100	4.1	−9.9
Turnout		2,430		
Labour hold		Swing	-4.9	
