= Bradford Mela =

Celebration held in Bradford, England

- Status: Active with free admission
- Genre: Festival and fair
- Date: CBA
- Frequency: One day annually as part of the Bradford Festival
- Venue: Bradford City Park
- Location: Bradford City Centre
- Coordinates: 54°47′33.36″N 1°45′15.3″W
- Inaugurated: 1988
- Most recent: 14 June 2015

Bradford Mela is a large scale celebration principally of South Asian culture and was the first such event in Europe. The Mela is a free one-day festival held in Bradford City Park and is part of the Bradford Festival.

Mela from Sanskrit means 'a gathering' or 'to meet' and in the UK Melas provide an opportunity for communities to come together to celebrate and share their cultures. At the Mela there will typically be children's activities, face painting, exhibitions, funfair rides, interactive sports, visual arts, street theatre, music and dance on stage, singers, crafts, costume making, stalls selling food, a bio dome, and marquees.

== History ==
The first Bradford Mela was in 1988, held in fields at the back of the University. It is the largest such event in the UK and Europe. After 1988 the Mela was held in Lister Park, Bradford until 1997 except for 1994 when it was held in Bowling Park. From 1998 to 2012 the Mela was held in Peel Park except for 2007 and 2012 when it was cancelled due to bad weather and ground conditions. The Mela used to take place over two days on a weekend and total visitor numbers typically exceed 100,000. From 2013 the Mela was reduced to a single day, and moved to Bradford City Park where it is part of the Bradford Festival.
