= Peel Park, Bradford =

Park in Bradford, England

Peel Park
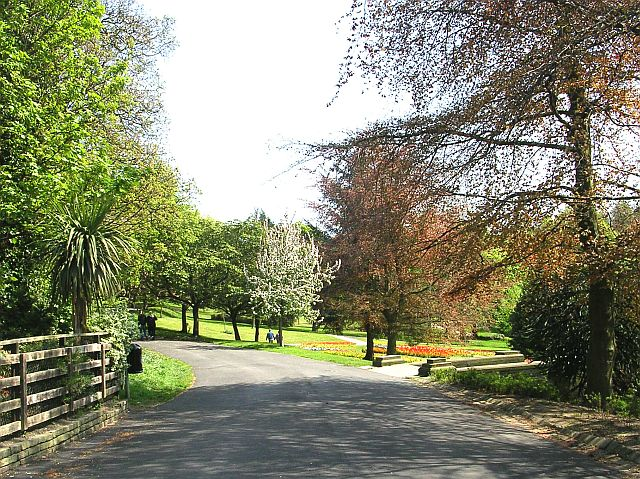
- Footpath near Bolton Road entrance
- Interactive map of Peel Park
- Type: Urban park
- Location: Undercliffe, Bradford, West Yorkshire
- Coordinates: 53.809°N 1.742°W
- Area: 22.6 ha (56 acres)
- Created: 1853
- Etymology: Named in memory of Sir Robert Peel
- Operator: City of Bradford, Parks and Landscape Services
- Status: open all year round
- Awards: Green Flag Award

Peel Park is a 22.6-hectare (56-acre) urban public park in the Bolton and Undercliffe area of Bradford, England, located about 0.75 miles (1.2 km) north-east of the city centre, and named after Sir Robert Peel (1788–1850). Peel Park was Bradford's first public park and is on the English Heritage and National Register of Historic Parks and Gardens online databases. The park is a Green Flag Award winner and has been for a number of years.

== History ==
A public meeting took place in St George's Hall, Bradford on 13 August 1850 to discuss the creation of a park as a memorial to Sir Robert Peel who had died that year. Together with a government donation of £1,500, funding was raised from Sir Robert Milligan, Sir Titus Salt, Forbes and Company and by numerous other private subscriptions to purchase 26 ha (64 acres) of land that was subsequently named Peel Park Estate, and some 22.6 ha (56 acres) of this land was developed as Peel Park. John Beanland, another leading figure in the project, worked closely with Salt and Milligan to facilitate the purchase and secure financial backing, ensuring the park’s creation.

The park was opened in 1853 and a series of galas were held in the park to raise funds to pay off the remaining debt for the purchase of the land and its layout as a park—this took some 12 years. In 1870 the park was conveyed to the Municipal Borough of Bradford, and is now owned by the City of Bradford. Money was then raised for the Joint Hospital Fund of Bradford by the galas until 1936 when the last gala was held.

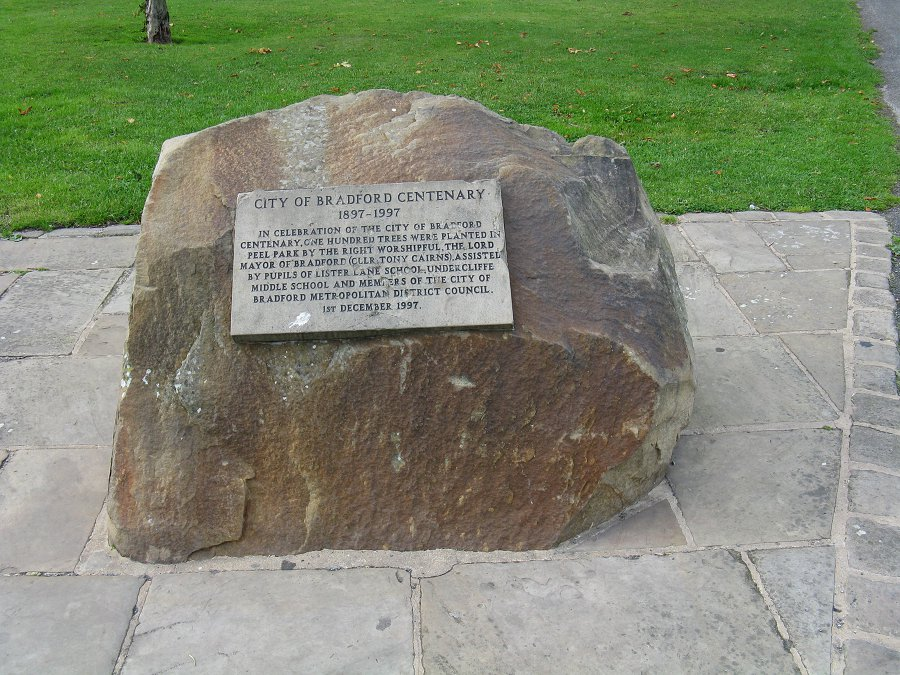
Bradford Centenary Memorial

In the 1900s the park lake had a large ornamental fountain and a footbridge crossing the lake. Slightly higher and to the east of the lake, separated by low cascade was a second smaller lake remodelled from a fish pond. To the north east of the lake was a fossilised tree and to the north west of the lake a conservatory—but all these have gone. Also missing are two statues of children, a sweep and shoeblack, executed by Mawer and Ingle and presented in 1867.

In 1902 an ornamental bandstand was erected midway along The Terrace but today this location is occupied by the statue of Sir Robert Peel. Another lost feature is the two cannons captured by the British in the Crimean War. The park had a total of four drinking fountains but two have been lost. The park had its own plant nursery south of the north-western entrance at Bolton Road with computer controlled greenhouses but this property was sold off for commercial use reducing the park's 22.6 ha. In 1997 Bradford City's centenary year, 100 trees were planted in the park and this is commemorated by a stone plaque on a boulder near the southern entrance.

== Landmarks ==
=== Entrances and lodges ===
The southern Cliffe Road entrance has ornate gates and a lodge (1861) but larger and more impressive are the main gates and lodge (1862) at the northern Bolton Road entrance. There are two grade II listed two-storey Italianate lodges, one at the park gates on Bolton Road and a smaller lodge to a similar design at the Cliffe Road entrance.

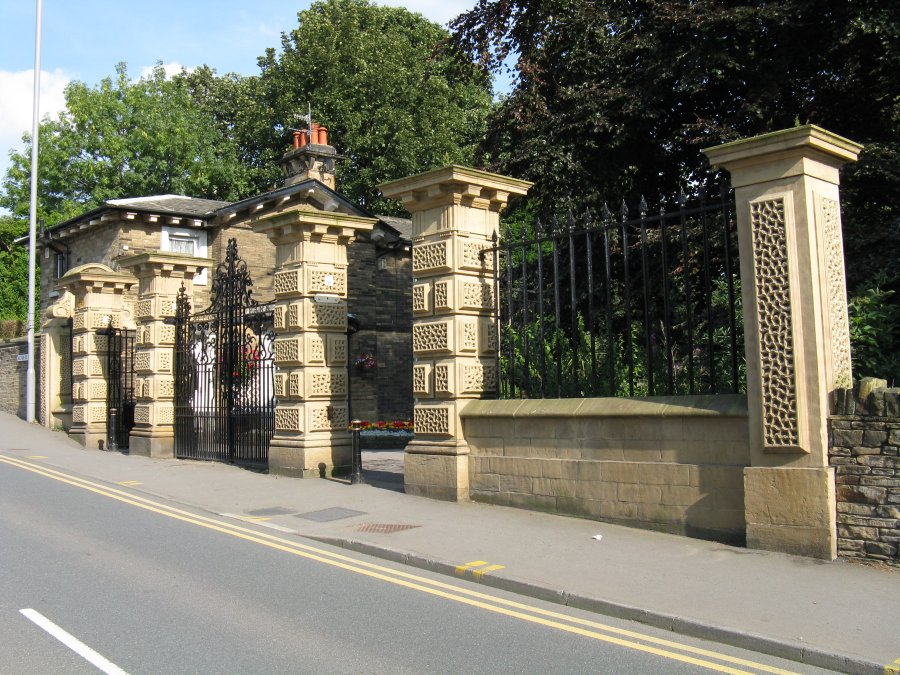
The Bolton Road entrance gates^{*} (1862)

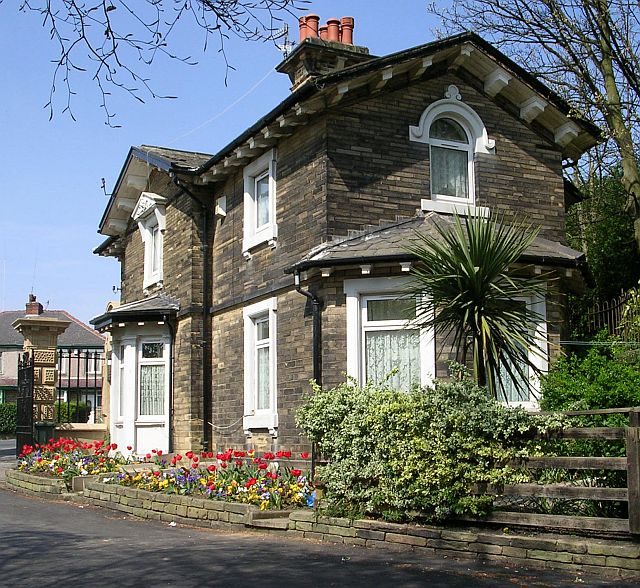
Bolton Road lodge^{*} (1862)

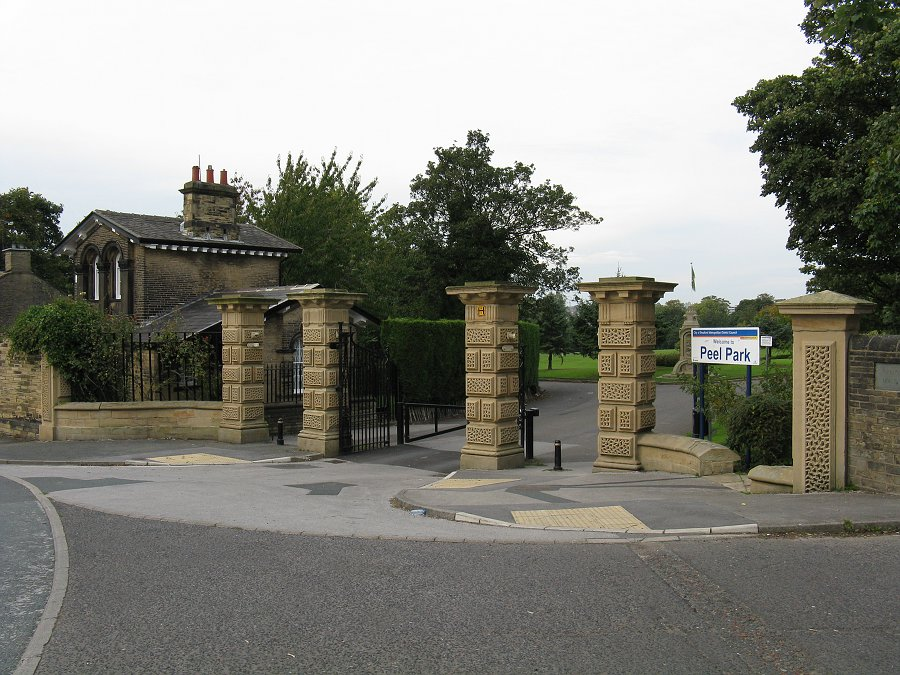
The Cliffe Road entrance gates and lodge^{*} (1861).
^{*} listed building

=== The Terrace ===
The main linear path through the park is The Terrace extending east west on which can be found a number of statues. One such is a statue of Sir Robert Peel made in 1855 and dressed in a mid 19th century frock coat and mounted on a cylindrical ashlar sandstone plinth.

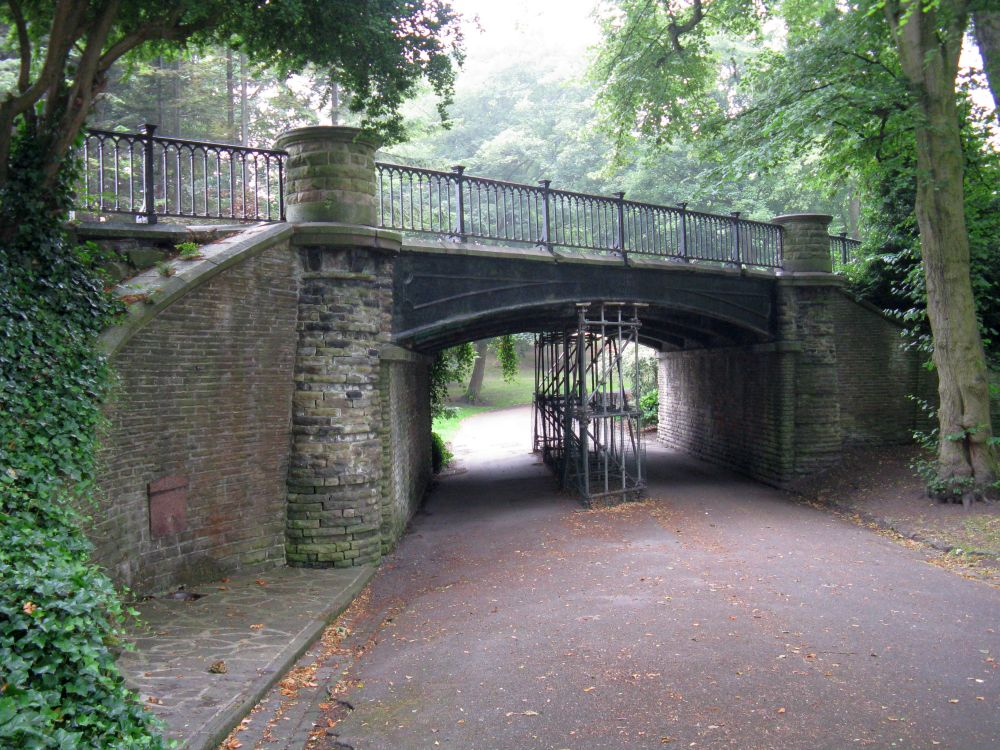
The bridge (1857) carrying The Terrace over a carriageway

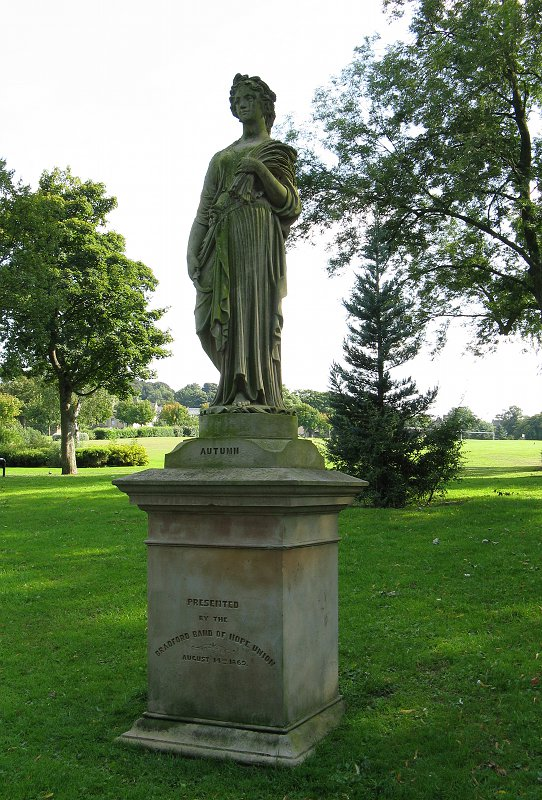
Statue of Autumn^{*} Ceres By W.Ashton (1869)

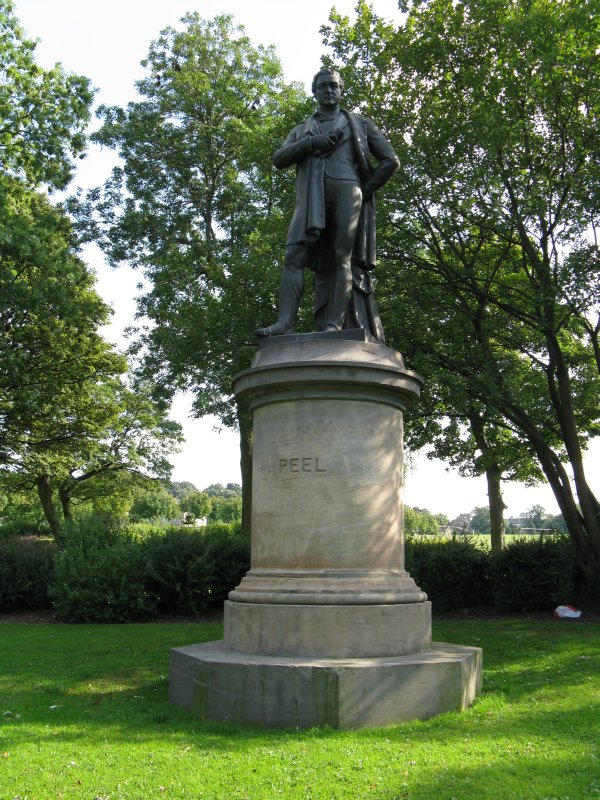
The Sir Robert Peel statue^{*}

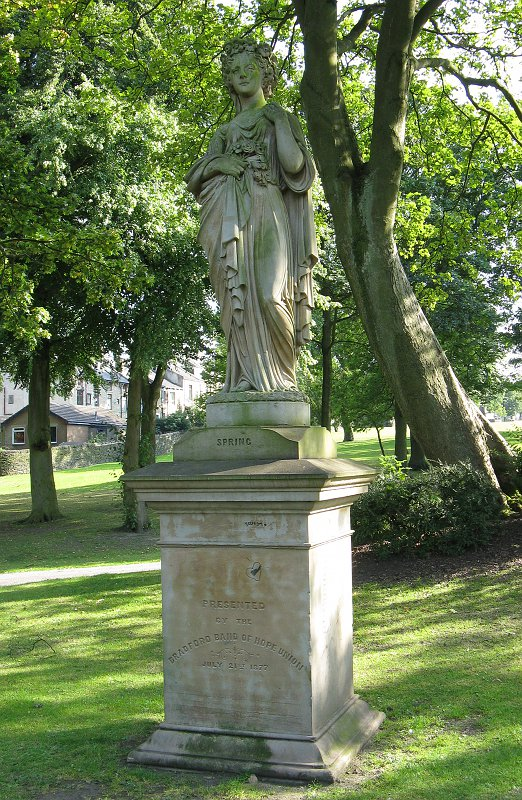
Statue of Spring^{*} (1877)

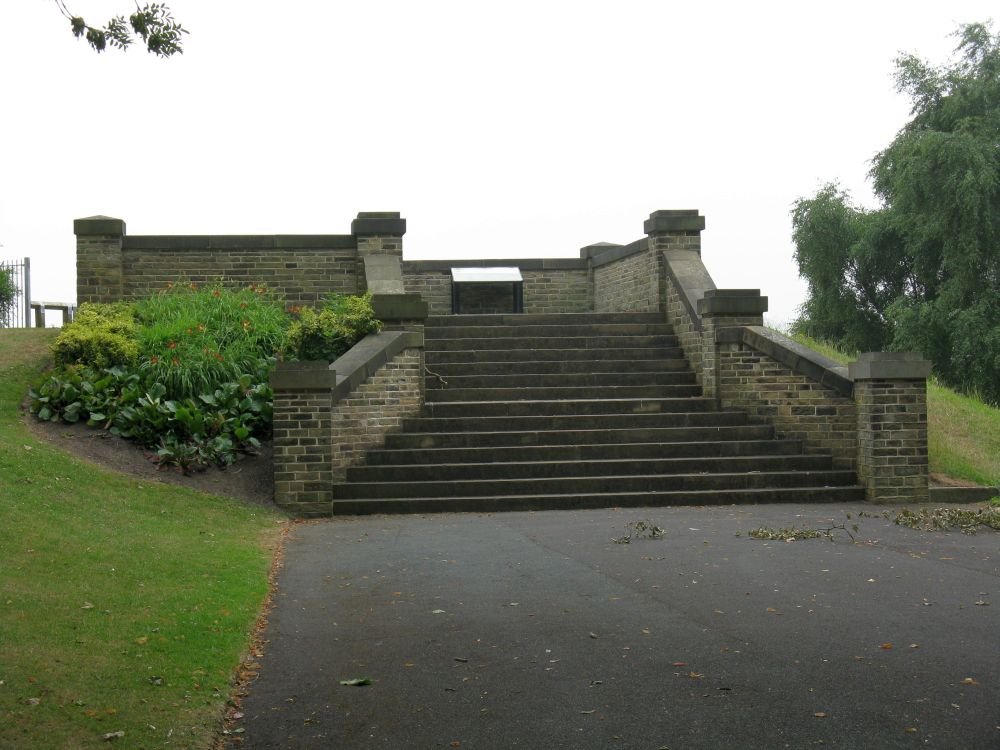
The viewing platform.
^{*} listed building

The Peel statue was the first public statue erected in Bradford and was originally located in what was Peel Place on Leeds Road, but re-erected post 1926 in Peel Park after Kassapian's Warehouse on Leeds Road was demolished. The sculptor was W. Behnes and the statue was cast in lead by the Robinson Scott Company of Pimlico. To the west of the Peel statue is a life-size statue of a Roman matron representing Autumn (1869) and to the east a statue of Roman matron representing Spring (1877) both given by the Bradford Band of Hope Union. All three statues are grade II listed. At the western end of The Terrace is the Viewing Platform (1853–93) giving views over the Bradford valley and Manningham. The platform was largely rebuilt in 1990 due to its poor condition. A cast iron bridge (1857) takes the eastern end of The Terrace over the carriage drive. The cast iron bridge beams are embossed with the words "RAILWAY-FOUNDRY. BRADFORD. 1857."

=== Drinking fountains ===
At the eastern end of the park on East Drive is a drinking fountain erected in the town in 1861 by the Bradford Band of Hope Union and later moved to Peel Park as a result of road improvements. Uphill from the drinking fountain in the far north-eastern corner of the park is the 'Events Area' where the Bradford Mela took place.

North of the southern entrance is an ornate stone drinking fountain (1861) in memory of Alderman Thomas Beaumont. The piers of this monument are recorded as having red granite corner shafts however, these are no longer evident.

By the side of the bridge taking The Terrace over a carriageway is a wall drinking fountain (1859) with red granite surround put there by Charles P Melly a Liverpool cotton merchant and philanthropist.

Close to the site of the abutments of the bridge that crossed the lake embedded in a wall by the southern edge of the lake is an ornate grade II listed stone doorway^{*} (1703–05). This was originally from the demolished Bradford Hall on Kirkgate, relocated here pre 1926.

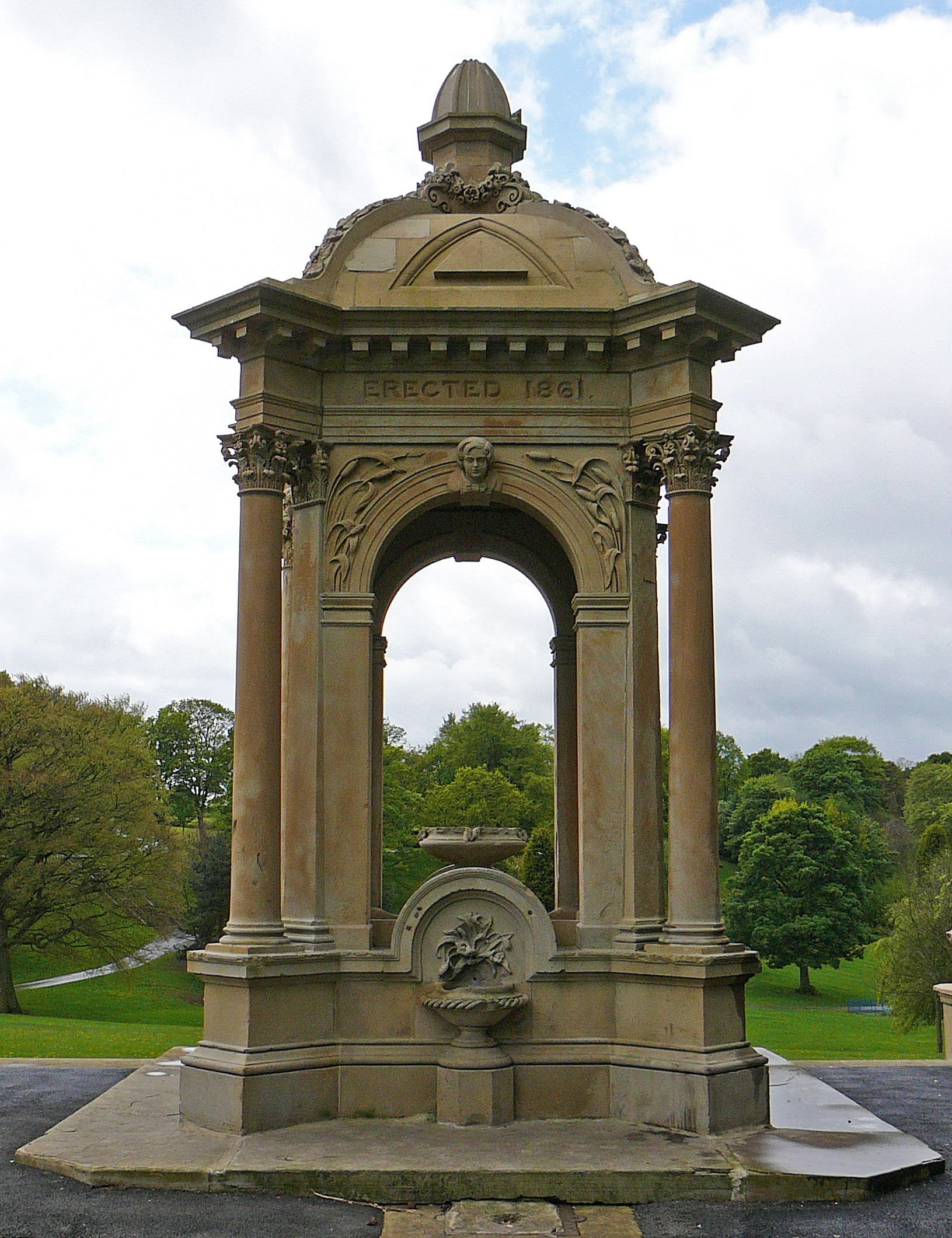
Band of Hope Union fountain^{*}

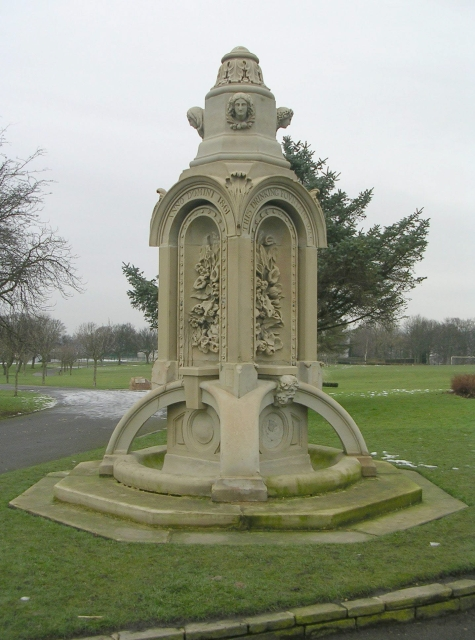
The Beaumont memorial fountain^{*}

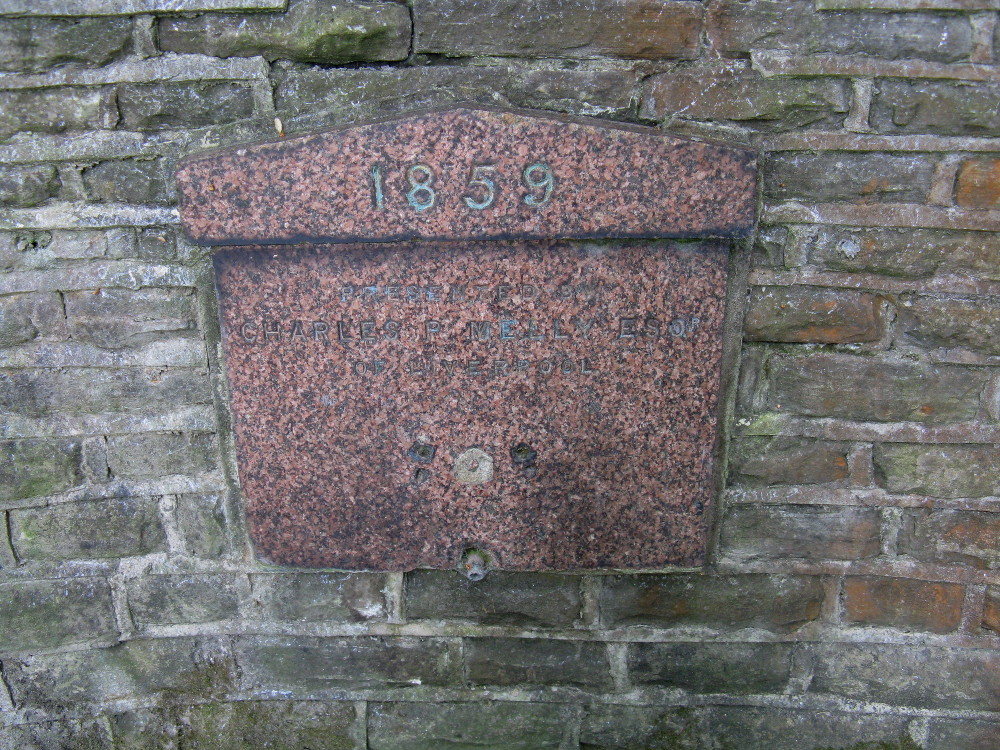
Charles P Melly former wall drinking fountain (1859)

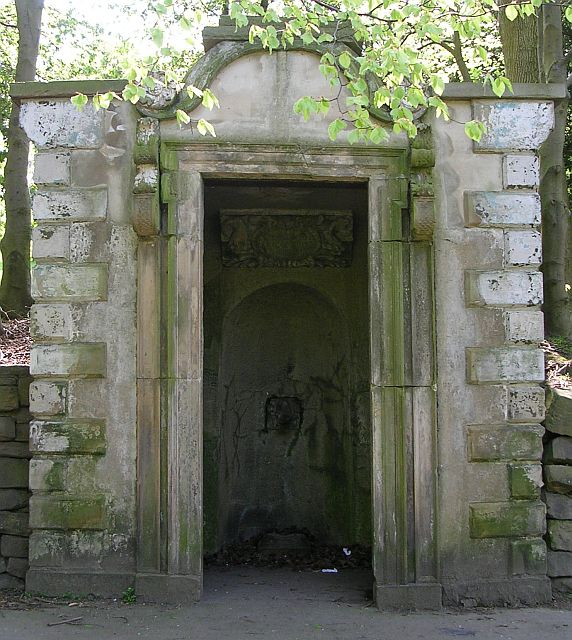
Old doorway^{*} to Bradford Hall on Kirkgate, with former drinking fountain inside
^{*} listed building

=== Lake ===
Close to the Bolton Road entrance, adjacent to formal gardens is a 'distorted figure-of-eight' shaped lake with two islands and a variety of water fowl. The island in the east of the lake is so large relatively that the lake takes on a serpentine appearance.

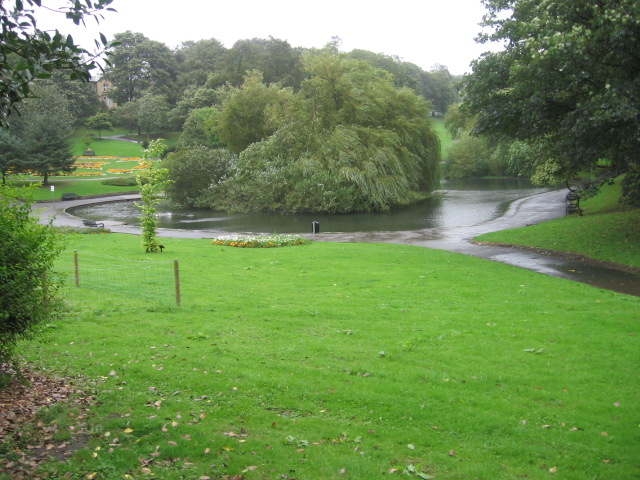
Western end of the lake

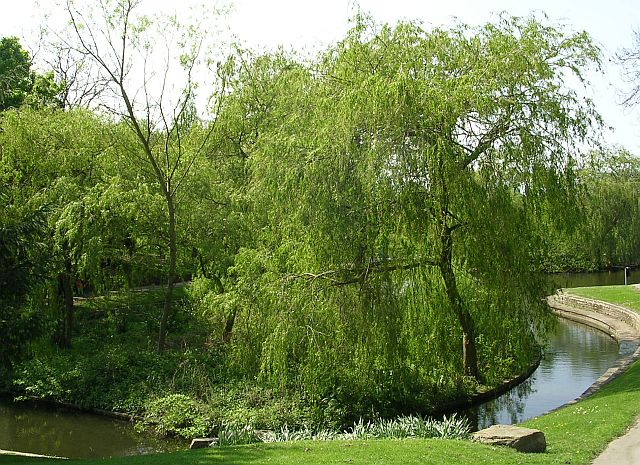
Eastern end of the lake

=== Facilities ===
For young children there are two fenced-in and equipped play areas—one to the east of the lake and the other close to the southern entrance. In the western end of the park is a sports field and BMX track. The recently redeveloped BMX racing track is floodlit, and open to the public outside club times. South of the Viewing Platform is the skateboard/BMX/rollerblade area, a five a side football court, tennis court, car park, toilets and changing rooms, cafe, pavilion and three bowling greens.

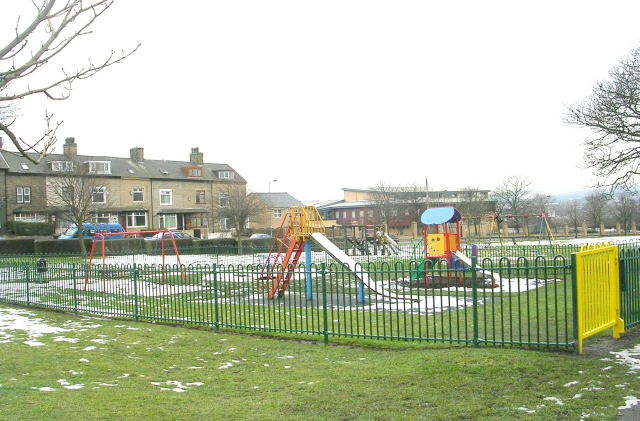
Upper play area

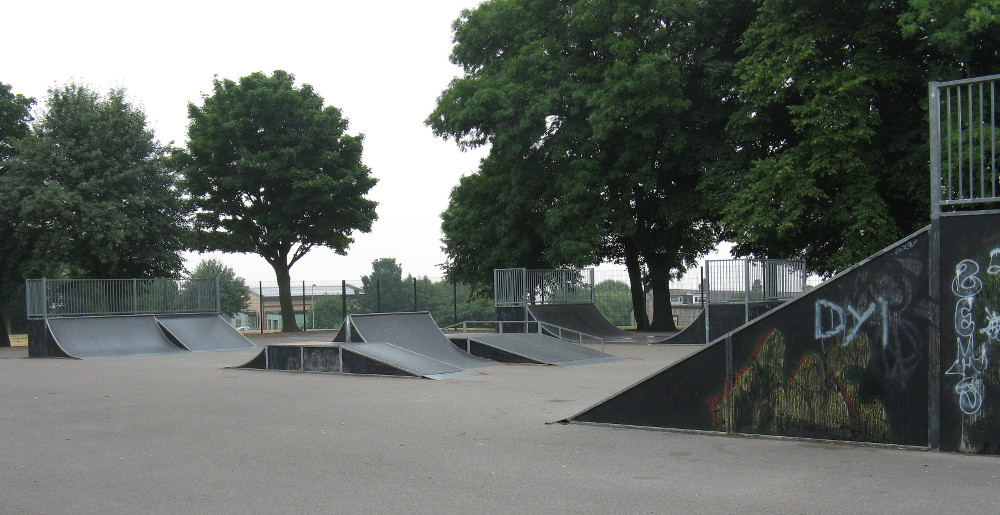
Skateboard, BMX and Rollerblade area

== Access ==
Peel Park is open at any time all year round and can be accessed from the main Cliffe Road and Bolton Road entrances and also from Park Cliffe Road, Harrogate Street, and Lister Lane. Although there are some steep paths and steps in the park, the pathways and carriageways will give wheelchair access to most of the park. Authorised vehicles can use the free-to-use car park accessible from the southern entrance gate.

== Events ==
The park and the Events Area in particular has been host to events such as the Bradford Mela and visiting circuses.

=== The Bradford Mela ===
Bradford Mela is a large scale celebration principally of South Asian culture and was the first such event in Europe. The Mela took place in the 'Events Area' in the far north east of the park from 1998 until 2012 except for 2007 and 2012 when it was cancelled due to bad weather and ground conditions. In 2013 the Mela was reduced to a single day, and moved to Bradford City Park where it is part of the Bradford Festival.

=== Cyclo-Cross championships ===
The park has hosted events in the Cyclo-Cross National Trophy competition. Along with the British National Championships in 2009, 2013, 2016.

== See also ==
- Bolton and Undercliffe.
- Listed buildings in Bradford (Bolton and Undercliffe Ward)
