= 1998 City of Bradford Metropolitan District Council election =

1998 UK local government election

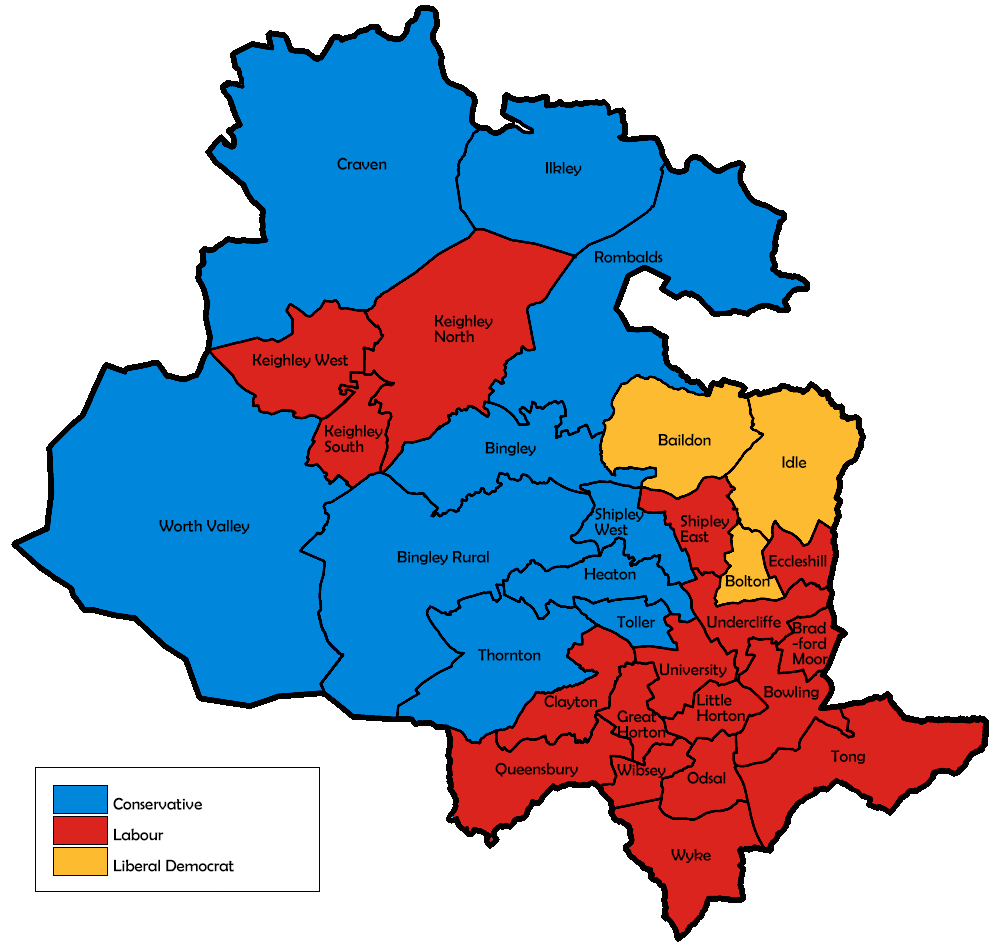
Map of the results for the 1998 Bradford council election.

The 1998 City of Bradford Metropolitan District Council elections were held on Thursday, 7 May 1998, with one third of the council up for election. Since the previous election there had been a number of by-elections resulting in two Labour defenses and a Conservative gain in Heaton, due to be defended at this election. Labour retained control of the council.

== Election results ==
Bradford local election result 1998
Party	Seats	Gains	Losses	Net gain/loss	Seats %	Votes %	Votes	+/−
Labour	17	0	5	▼5	56.7	41.3	42,087	-8.1
Conservative	10	5	1	▲4	33.3	38.6	39,356	+6.8
Liberal Democrats	3	1	0	▲1	10.0	16.4	16,707	+0.1
Green	0	0	0	Steady	0.0	2.1	2,100	+0.6
Independent	0	0	0	Steady	0.0	1.4	1,429	+1.4
Socialist	0	0	0	Steady	0.0	0.3	321	+0.0

This result had the following consequences for the total number of seats on the council after the elections:

Party	Previous council	New council
Labour	70	65
Conservative	14	18
Liberal Democrat	6	7
Total	90	90
Working majority	50	40

== Ward results ==
Baildon
Party	Candidate	Votes	%	±%
Liberal Democrats	A. Thornton	2,166	49.3	−4.0
Conservative	C. Charlesworth	1,916	43.6	+8.0
Labour	C. Rangzeb	314	7.1	−4.0
Majority		250	5.7	−12.0
Turnout		4,396		
Liberal Democrats gain from Conservative		Swing	-6.0	

Bingley
Party	Candidate	Votes	%	±%
Conservative	C. Gill	2,046	48.1	+5.4
Labour	I. Bowmaker	1,794	42.2	−1.8
Liberal Democrats	R. Walter	288	6.8	−2.5
Green	M. Thompson	124	2.9	−1.1
Majority		252	5.9	+4.7
Turnout		4,252		
Conservative gain from Labour		Swing	+3.6	

Bingley Rural
Party	Candidate	Votes	%	±%
Conservative	E. Eaton	2,631	62.1	+15.7
Labour	L. Cooper	1,310	30.9	−10.3
Liberal Democrats	C. Svensgaard	295	7.0	−5.4
Majority		1,321	31.2	+26.0
Turnout		4,236		
Conservative hold		Swing	+13.0	

Bolton
Party	Candidate	Votes	%	±%
Liberal Democrats	A. Hillary	1,822	56.1	+2.2
Labour	R. Goulden	872	26.9	−1.7
Conservative	H. Lycett	553	17.0	−0.5
Majority		950	29.3	+3.8
Turnout		3,247		
Liberal Democrats hold		Swing	+1.9	

Bowling
Party	Candidate	Votes	%	±%
Labour	J. Ellison	1,639	59.6	+2.5
Conservative	G. Johnson	702	25.5	+14.2
Liberal Democrats	J. Harrington	407	14.8	+6.2
Majority		937	34.1	+0.0
Turnout		2,748		
Labour hold		Swing	-5.8	

Bradford Moor
Party	Candidate	Votes	%	±%
Labour	M. Yaqoob	1,625	50.9	+0.9
Conservative	M. Qureshi	1,218	38.2	−2.0
Liberal Democrats	J. Mangeolles	349	10.9	+1.1
Majority		407	12.7	+2.9
Turnout		3,192		
Labour hold		Swing	+1.4	

Clayton
Party	Candidate	Votes	%	±%
Labour	G. Mitchell	1,341	44.4	−6.8
Conservative	E. Byrom	1,305	43.2	+5.0
Liberal Democrats	H. Tooby	372	12.3	+4.4
Majority		36	1.2	−11.8
Turnout		3,018		
Labour hold		Swing	-5.9	

Craven
Party	Candidate	Votes	%	±%
Conservative	E. Dawson	1,766	50.9	+3.9
Labour	F. Harrison	1,158	33.4	−5.8
Liberal Democrats	C. de Franca Hedges	358	10.3	−3.5
Independent	F. Hirlam	188	5.4	+5.4
Majority		608	17.5	+9.7
Turnout		3,470		
Conservative hold		Swing	+4.8	

Eccleshill
Party	Candidate	Votes	%	±%
Labour	P. Lancaster	1,006	41.1	−11.9
Conservative	J. Ryder	771	31.5	+0.1
Liberal Democrats	M. Attenborough	612	25.0	+9.6
Independent	T. Craig	57	2.3	+2.3
Majority		235	9.6	−12.0
Turnout		2,446		
Labour hold		Swing	-6.0	

Great Horton
Party	Candidate	Votes	%	±%
Labour	S. Collard	1,649	53.5	−6.7
Conservative	M. Crabtree	1,048	34.0	+7.2
Liberal Democrats	C. Wright	387	12.5	+2.6
Majority		601	19.5	−13.9
Turnout		3,084		
Labour hold		Swing	-6.9	

Heaton
Party	Candidate	Votes	%	±%
Conservative	J. King	2,224	49.6	+7.5
Labour	S. Barnbrook	1,821	40.6	−4.5
Liberal Democrats	A. Griffiths	259	5.8	−2.3
Green	P. Braham	179	4.0	−0.6
Majority		403	9.0	+6.0
Turnout		4,483		
Conservative hold		Swing	+6.0	

Idle
Party	Candidate	Votes	%	±%
Liberal Democrats	J. Sunderland	2,029	57.1	+4.3
Labour	J. Holliday	865	24.3	−7.2
Conservative	J. Spencer	662	18.6	+2.9
Majority		1,164	32.7	+11.6
Turnout		3,556		
Liberal Democrats hold		Swing	-5.7	

Ilkley
Party	Candidate	Votes	%	±%
Conservative	A. Hawkesworth	2,582	65.5	+14.0
Labour	P. Cheney	895	22.7	−9.5
Liberal Democrats	S. Harris	462	11.7	−4.5
Majority		1,687	42.8	+23.6
Turnout		3,939		
Conservative hold		Swing	+11.7	

Keighley North
Party	Candidate	Votes	%	±%
Labour	M. Leathley	1,961	50.3	−5.3
Conservative	G. Yates	1,508	38.7	+5.2
Liberal Democrats	E. Hallmann	427	11.0	+0.1
Majority		453	11.6	−10.5
Turnout		3,896		
Labour hold		Swing	-5.2	

Keighley South
Party	Candidate	Votes	%	±%
Labour	J. Prestage	1,739	68.4	−7.1
Conservative	M. Startin	507	19.9	+5.4
Liberal Democrats	I. Inness	296	11.6	+1.6
Majority		1,232	48.5	−12.5
Turnout		2,542		
Labour hold		Swing	-6.2	

Keighley West
Party	Candidate	Votes	%	±%
Labour	I. Ellison-Wood	1,535	46.1	−15.4
Conservative	W. Redman	991	29.8	+2.8
Independent	B. Hudson	483	14.5	+14.5
Liberal Democrats	C. Brown	319	9.6	−1.9
Majority		544	16.3	−18.3
Turnout		3,328		
Labour hold		Swing	-9.1	

Little Horton
Party	Candidate	Votes	%	±%
Labour	M. Darr	1,062	41.7	−24.1
Conservative	I. Khan	1,035	40.6	+24.5
Liberal Democrats	J. Massen	232	9.1	−3.6
Green	K. Spencer	110	4.3	+4.3
Socialist	K. Wilson	108	4.2	−1.1
Majority		27	1.1	−48.7
Turnout		2,547		
Labour hold		Swing	-24.3	

Odsal
Party	Candidate	Votes	%	±%
Labour	S. Dewdney	1,708	56.5	−3.1
Conservative	R. Sheard	889	29.4	+2.7
Liberal Democrats	B. Boulton	428	14.1	+0.5
Majority		819	27.1	−5.9
Turnout		3,025		
Labour hold		Swing	-2.9	

Queensbury
Party	Candidate	Votes	%	±%
Labour	H. Mason	1,486	44.8	−10.4
Conservative	A. Smith	1,435	43.3	+11.3
Liberal Democrats	A. Allen	394	11.9	−0.9
Majority		51	1.5	−21.7
Turnout		3,315		
Labour hold		Swing	-10.8	

Rombalds
Party	Candidate	Votes	%	±%
Conservative	C. Greaves	2,267	49.0	−1.8
Labour	A. Atkins	1,338	28.9	−4.0
Liberal Democrats	J. Eccles	1,021	22.1	+5.8
Majority		929	20.1	+2.3
Turnout		4,626		
Conservative hold		Swing	+1.1	

Shipley East
Party	Candidate	Votes	%	±%
Labour	T. Miller	1,534	58.5	−5.2
Conservative	D. Herdson	517	19.7	+1.1
Liberal Democrats	J. Hall	460	17.5	+3.4
Green	M. Love	112	4.3	+0.7
Majority		1,017	38.8	−6.3
Turnout		2,623		
Labour hold		Swing	-3.1	

Shipley West
Party	Candidate	Votes	%	±%
Conservative	J. Carroll	1,766	37.3	+1.1
Labour	L. Joyce	1,683	35.5	−8.0
Green	D. Ford	1,000	21.1	+9.7
Liberal Democrats	J. Main	286	6.0	−2.8
Majority		83	1.7	−5.5
Turnout		4,735		
Conservative gain from Labour		Swing	-4.5	

Thornton
Party	Candidate	Votes	%	±%
Conservative	C. Richardson	1,341	47.7	+12.9
Labour	A. Pitts	839	29.9	−17.2
Liberal Democrats	H. Wright	527	18.8	+4.4
Green	M. Rawnsley	102	3.6	+1.0
Majority		502	17.9	+5.6
Turnout		2,809		
Conservative gain from Labour		Swing	+15.0	

Toller
Party	Candidate	Votes	%	±%
Conservative	Q. Khan	2,398	49.2	+9.6
Labour	A. Hussain	1,923	39.4	−12.8
Liberal Democrats	L. Howard	429	8.8	+3.7
Green	N. Taimuri	128	2.6	+0.3
Majority		475	9.7	−2.9
Turnout		4,878		
Conservative gain from Labour		Swing	+11.2	

Tong
Party	Candidate	Votes	%	±%
Labour	J. Ruding	1,077	66.6	−7.1
Liberal Democrats	A. Cruden	321	19.9	+10.2
Conservative	D. Servant	218	13.5	−0.8
Majority		756	46.8	−12.7
Turnout		1,616		
Labour hold		Swing	-8.6	

Undercliffe
Party	Candidate	Votes	%	±%
Labour	R. Sowman	1,436	51.6	−11.6
Conservative	M. Looby	873	31.3	+8.9
Liberal Democrats	C. Middleton	476	17.1	+2.8
Majority		563	20.2	−20.5
Turnout		2,785		
Labour hold		Swing	-10.2	

University
Party	Candidate	Votes	%	±%
Labour	I. Khan	2,497	59.6	−12.7
Conservative	V. Binney	935	22.3	+9.3
Green	J. Robinson	345	8.2	+2.4
Socialist	S. Shah	213	5.1	+2.3
Liberal Democrats	A. Wilson-Fletcher	200	4.8	−1.2
Majority		1,562	37.3	−22.0
Turnout		4,190		
Labour hold		Swing	-11.0	

Wibsey
Party	Candidate	Votes	%	±%
Labour	K. Thomson	1,649	56.5	−4.7
Conservative	D. Manogue	917	31.4	+5.3
Liberal Democrats	S. Devonshire	351	12.0	−0.6
Majority		732	25.1	−10.0
Turnout		2,917		
Labour hold		Swing	-5.0	

Worth valley
Party	Candidate	Votes	%	±%
Conservative	K. Hopkins	1,510	41.3	+11.3
Labour	L. Woodward	1,164	31.8	−11.8
Independent	D. Samuels	701	19.2	+19.2
Liberal Democrats	P. Kierman	282	7.7	−18.7
Majority		346	9.5	−4.2
Turnout		3,657		
Conservative gain from Labour		Swing	+11.5	

Wyke
Party	Candidate	Votes	%	±%
Labour	D. Mangham	1,167	47.7	−10.2
Conservative	R. Reynolds	825	33.8	+5.4
Liberal Democrats	K. Hall	452	18.5	+4.8
Majority		342	14.0	−15.6
Turnout		2,444		
Labour hold		Swing	-7.8	

== By-elections between 1998 and 1999 ==
Little Horton By-Election 18 March 1999
Party	Candidate	Votes	%	±%
Labour	Sher Khan	1,227	60.2	+18.5
Conservative		538	26.4	−14.2
Liberal Democrats		272	13.4	+4.3
Majority		689	33.8	
Turnout		2,037	17.0	
Labour hold		Swing	+16.3	
