= 1996 City of Bradford Metropolitan District Council election =

1996 UK local government election

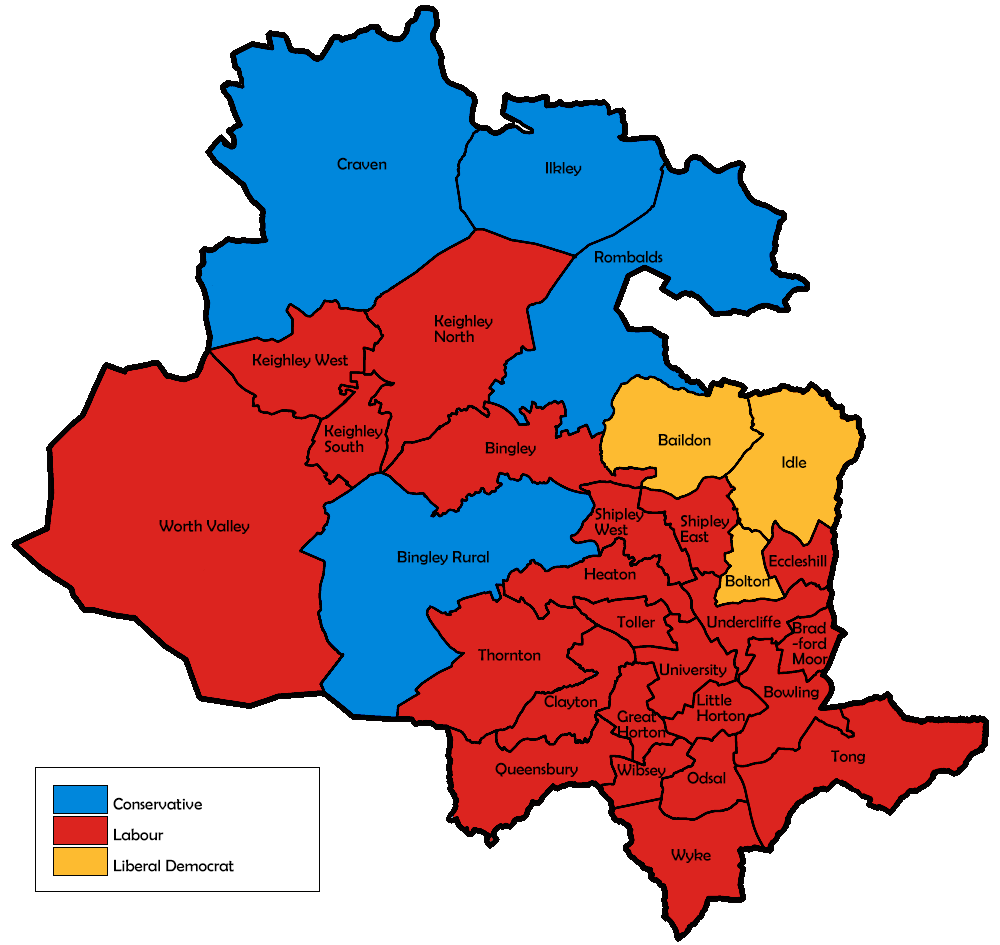
Map of the results for the 1996 Bradford council election.

1996 City of Bradford Metropolitan District Council elections were held on Thursday, 2 May 1996, with one third of the council up for election. Labour retained control of the council.

== Election results ==
Bradford local election result 1996
Party	Seats	Gains	Losses	Net gain/loss	Seats %	Votes %	Votes	+/−
Labour	23	13	0	▲13	76.7	49.4	58,339	-5.0
Conservative	4	0	15	▼15	13.3	31.8	37,575	+3.3
Liberal Democrats	3	2	0	▲2	9.9	16.3	19,302	+2.5
Green	0	0	0	Steady	0.0	1.5	1,825	-0.4
Independent Labour	0	0	0	Steady	0.0	0.6	732	-0.2
Militant Labour	0	0	0	Steady	0.0	0.3	362	+0.1

This result had the following consequences for the total number of seats on the council after the elections:

Party	Previous council	New council
Labour	58	71
Conservative	28	13
Liberal Democrat	4	6
Total	90	90
Working majority	26	52

== Ward results ==
Baildon
Party	Candidate	Votes	%	±%
Liberal Democrats	A. Micklem	2,540	53.3	+9.7
Conservative	R. Cope	1,697	35.6	+1.6
Labour	M. Yaqoob	531	11.1	−7.1
Majority		843	17.7	+8.1
Turnout		4,768		
Liberal Democrats gain from Conservative		Swing	+4.0	

Bingley
Party	Candidate	Votes	%	±%
Labour	E. Sinclair	1,959	44.0	−12.5
Conservative	C. Gill	1,903	42.7	+6.4
Liberal Democrats	C. Svensgaard	412	9.2	+9.2
Green	M. Thompson	179	4.0	−3.2
Majority		56	1.3	−18.9
Turnout		4,453		
Labour gain from Conservative		Swing	-9.4	

Bingley Rural
Party	Candidate	Votes	%	±%
Conservative	P. Pettit	2,030	46.4	+2.8
Labour	M. Leslie	1,802	41.2	−2.0
Liberal Democrats	J. Hutton	541	12.4	−0.8
Majority		228	5.2	+4.9
Turnout		4,373		
Conservative hold		Swing	+2.4	

Bolton
Party	Candidate	Votes	%	±%
Liberal Democrats	H. Middleton	2,073	54.0	+15.7
Labour	B. Singh	1,096	28.5	−13.7
Conservative	M. Gaunt	673	17.5	−2.0
Majority		977	25.4	+21.4
Turnout		3,842		
Liberal Democrats gain from Conservative		Swing	+14.7	

Bowling
Party	Candidate	Votes	%	±%
Labour	J. Ryan	1,819	57.1	+5.6
Independent Labour	D. Coughlin	732	23.0	−3.7
Conservative	J. Ridyard	362	11.4	+3.8
Liberal Democrats	R. Harrington	273	8.6	−3.0
Majority		1,087	34.1	+9.3
Turnout		3,186		
Labour hold		Swing	+4.6	

Bradford Moor
Party	Candidate	Votes	%	±%
Labour	G. Khaliq	2,046	50.0	+5.7
Conservative	M. Choudhary	1,642	40.1	−2.9
Liberal Democrats	J. Collins	403	9.8	−2.8
Majority		404	9.9	+8.6
Turnout		4,091		
Labour hold		Swing	+4.3	

Clayton
Party	Candidate	Votes	%	±%
Labour	G. Whitfield	1,992	51.2	+0.5
Conservative	E. Byrom	1,487	38.2	−1.5
Liberal Democrats	A. Wilson-Fletche	308	7.9	+1.4
Green	M. Rawnsley	104	2.7	−0.4
Majority		505	13.0	+2.0
Turnout		3,891		
Labour gain from Conservative		Swing	+1.0	

Craven
Party	Candidate	Votes	%	±%
Conservative	D. Harrison	2,113	47.0	+4.6
Labour	R. Kelly	1,762	39.2	−5.9
Liberal Democrats	G. Morgan	623	13.8	+1.2
Majority		351	7.8	+5.1
Turnout		4,498		
Conservative hold		Swing	+5.2	

Eccleshill
Party	Candidate	Votes	%	±%
Labour	S. Rooney	1,524	53.1	−7.3
Conservative	H. Lycett	903	31.4	+5.3
Liberal Democrats	M. Attenborough	444	15.5	+2.1
Majority		621	21.6	−12.7
Turnout		2,871		
Labour gain from Conservative		Swing	-6.3	

Great Horton
Party	Candidate	Votes	%	±%
Labour	F. Collard	2,230	60.2	−3.8
Conservative	M. Crabtree	993	26.8	+5.5
Liberal Democrats	C. Wright	370	10.0	−1.7
Green	W. Taylor	112	3.0	+0.0
Majority		1,237	33.4	−9.2
Turnout		3,705		
Labour gain from Conservative		Swing	-4.6	

Heaton
Party	Candidate	Votes	%	±%
Labour	M. Ajeeb	2,251	45.1	−16.7
Conservative	J. King	2,102	42.1	+15.0
Liberal Democrats	A. Cruden	405	8.1	+0.5
Green	J. Robinson	231	4.6	+1.2
Majority		149	3.0	−31.7
Turnout		4,989		
Labour gain from Conservative		Swing	-15.8	

Idle
Party	Candidate	Votes	%	±%
Liberal Democrats	D. Ward	2,173	52.7	+15.0
Labour	F. Dale	1,300	31.5	−16.9
Conservative	A. White	648	15.7	+1.9
Majority		873	21.2	+10.4
Turnout		4,121		
Liberal Democrats hold		Swing	+15.9	

Ilkley
Party	Candidate	Votes	%	±%
Conservative	C. Powell	2,421	51.5	−4.3
Labour	R. Fox	1,515	32.2	−12.0
Liberal Democrats	M. Cohen	765	16.3	+16.3
Majority		906	19.3	+7.7
Turnout		4,701		
Conservative hold		Swing	+3.8	

Keighley North
Party	Candidate	Votes	%	±%
Labour	A. Macpherson	2,512	55.6	−7.3
Conservative	K. Jepson	1,514	33.5	+8.0
Liberal Democrats	A. Carter	490	10.8	−0.7
Majority		998	22.1	−15.4
Turnout		4,516		
Labour gain from Conservative		Swing	-7.6	

Keighley South
Party	Candidate	Votes	%	±%
Labour	S. Thomas	2,411	75.5	+1.0
Conservative	C. Coleman	463	14.5	+2.7
Liberal Democrats	M. Hamid	320	10.0	−3.7
Majority		1,948	61.0	+0.2
Turnout		3,194		
Labour hold		Swing	-0.8	

Keighley West
Party	Candidate	Votes	%	±%
Labour	A. Mudd	2,511	61.5	−3.9
Conservative	W. Redman	1,099	26.9	+5.1
Liberal Democrats	J. Brooksbank	470	11.5	−1.2
Majority		1,412	34.6	−9.1
Turnout		4,080		
Labour hold		Swing	-4.5	

Little Horton
Party	Candidate	Votes	%	±%
Labour	M. Mir	1,857	65.8	−5.6
Conservative	G. Johnson	454	16.1	+5.9
Liberal Democrats	A. Griffiths	359	12.7	+5.4
Militant Labour	M. Dominguez	151	5.3	-3.8
Majority		1,403	49.7	−11.6
Turnout		2,821		
Labour hold		Swing	-5.7	

Odsal
Party	Candidate	Votes	%	±%
Labour	J. O'Neill	2,316	59.6	−5.9
Conservative	J. Robertshaw	1,037	26.7	+6.1
Liberal Democrats	K. Hall	532	13.7	+2.3
Majority		1,279	32.9	−12.0
Turnout		3,885		
Labour gain from Conservative		Swing	-6.0	

Queensbury
Party	Candidate	Votes	%	±%
Labour	M. Mason	2,145	55.2	−10.0
Conservative	L. Jagger	1,241	32.0	+8.6
Liberal Democrats	J. Saul	497	12.8	+2.3
Majority		904	23.3	−18.6
Turnout		3,883		
Labour gain from Conservative		Swing	-9.3	

Rombalds
Party	Candidate	Votes	%	±%
Conservative	D. Smith	2,446	50.8	+7.1
Labour	A. Atkins	1,588	33.0	+1.8
Liberal Democrats	J. Main	782	16.2	−8.9
Majority		858	17.8	+5.2
Turnout		4,816		
Conservative hold		Swing	+2.6	

Shipley East
Party	Candidate	Votes	%	±%
Labour	P. Thornton	1,944	63.7	−3.3
Conservative	D. Servant	568	18.6	+3.5
Liberal Democrats	J. Hall	431	14.1	−0.1
Green	M. Love	108	3.5	+3.5
Majority		1,376	45.1	−6.8
Turnout		3,051		
Labour hold		Swing	-3.4	

Shipley West
Party	Candidate	Votes	%	±%
Labour	H. Gundry	2,121	43.5	−7.0
Conservative	J. Carroll	1,766	36.2	+2.2
Green	D. Ford	554	11.4	+3.1
Liberal Democrats	J. Gregory	433	8.9	+1.7
Majority		355	7.3	−9.3
Turnout		4,874		
Labour gain from Conservative		Swing	-4.6	

Thornton
Party	Candidate	Votes	%	±%
Labour	D. Kettlewell	1,561	47.0	−4.7
Conservative	M. Ellis	1,155	34.8	−0.1
Liberal Democrats	H. Wright	477	14.4	+3.8
Green	A. Suchi	87	2.6	−0.4
Militant Labour	L. Wilkinson	38	1.1	+1.1
Majority		406	12.2	−4.8
Turnout		3,318		
Labour gain from Conservative		Swing	-2.4	

Toller
Party	Candidate	Votes	%	±%
Labour	D. Brown	2,891	52.2	+8.6
Conservative	A. Rashid	2,190	39.6	−6.7
Liberal Democrats	S. Devonshire	280	5.1	−2.9
Green	N. Taimuri	131	2.4	+0.2
Militant Labour	C. Thompson	43	0.8	+0.8
Majority		701	12.7	+9.9
Turnout		5,535		
Labour hold		Swing	+7.6	

Tong
Party	Candidate	Votes	%	±%
Labour	J. Cairns	1,555	73.7	−3.7
Conservative	E. Harker	301	14.3	+0.6
Liberal Democrats	C. Devonshire	204	9.7	+0.7
Green	P. Braham	49	2.3	+2.3
Majority		1,254	59.5	−4.3
Turnout		2,109		
Labour hold		Swing	-2.1	

Undercliffe
Party	Candidate	Votes	%	±%
Labour	P. Foord	1,942	63.2	−4.3
Conservative	E. Blackburn	690	22.5	+8.3
Liberal Democrats	E. Hallmann	440	14.3	+1.2
Majority		1,252	40.8	−12.7
Turnout		3,072		
Labour hold		Swing	-6.3	

University
Party	Candidate	Votes	%	±%
Labour	S. Hussain	3,331	72.3	+3.9
Conservative	I. Grieve	601	13.0	−8.1
Liberal Democrats	L. McKeever	277	6.0	+6.0
Green	N. Tart	270	5.9	−4.6
Militant Labour	S. Jackson	130	2.8	+2.8
Majority		2,730	59.2	+12.0
Turnout		4,609		
Labour hold		Swing	+6.0	

Wibsey
Party	Candidate	Votes	%	±%
Labour	V. McMath	2,129	61.2	−4.1
Conservative	R. Sheard	909	26.1	+3.6
Liberal Democrats	B. Boulton	439	12.6	+0.5
Majority		1,220	35.1	−7.7
Turnout		3,477		
Labour gain from Conservative		Swing	-3.8	

Worth Valley
Party	Candidate	Votes	%	±%
Labour	J. Cope	1,808	43.6	−2.5
Conservative	G. Hodgson	1,242	30.0	−4.0
Liberal Democrats	D. Samuels	1,093	26.4	+6.5
Majority		566	13.7	+1.6
Turnout		4,143		
Labour gain from Conservative		Swing	-3.2	

Wyke
Party	Candidate	Votes	%	±%
Labour	A. Niland	1,890	57.9	−7.0
Conservative	V. Owen	925	28.3	+8.9
Liberal Democrats	H. Boulton	448	13.7	−1.8
Majority		965	29.6	−15.9
Turnout		3,263		
Labour gain from Conservative		Swing	-7.9	

== By-elections between 1996 and 1998 ==
Heaton by-election 26 September 1996
Party	Candidate	Votes	%	±%
Conservative	John King	2,041	50.4	+8.3
Labour		1,808	44.6	−0.5
Liberal Democrats		202	5.0	−3.1
Majority		233	5.8	+2.8
Turnout		4,051	34.8	
Conservative gain from Labour		Swing	+4.4	

Shipley West by-election 9 October 1997
Party	Candidate	Votes	%	±%
Labour	Rowland Dale	1,263	36.8	−6.7
Conservative		1,222	35.6	−0.6
Green		667	19.4	+8.0
Liberal Democrats		284	8.3	−0.6
Majority		41	1.2	−6.1
Turnout		3,436		
Labour hold		Swing	-3.0	

Baildon by-election 20 November 1997
Party	Candidate	Votes	%	±%
Liberal Democrats	John Cole	1,614	52.3	−1.0
Conservative		1,077	34.9	−0.7
Labour		372	12.1	+1.0
Independent		22	0.7	+0.7
Majority		537	17.4	−0.3
Turnout		3,085	24.6	
Liberal Democrats hold		Swing	-0.1	
