= Listed buildings in Bradford (Bolton and Undercliffe Ward) =

Bolton and Undercliffe is a ward in the metropolitan borough of the City of Bradford, West Yorkshire, England. It contains 20 listed buildings that are recorded in the National Heritage List for England. All the listed buildings are designated at Grade II, the lowest of the three grades, which is applied to "buildings of national importance and special interest". The ward is a suburb of Bradford to the northeast of the city centre and is almost completely residential. It includes Peel Park which contains listed buildings, including the entrance lodges, statues, drinking fountains, and a relocated doorway and wall. The other listed buildings include houses and cottages, farmhouses and farm buildings, a church, and a school.

== Buildings ==
Name and location	Photograph	Date	Notes
Ivy Hall; 53.81743°N 1.73495°W	—	Early 17th century	The house, which was later extended, is in sandstone and gritstone, and has a stone slate roof with saddlestones and kneelers. There are two storeys, and the windows are mullioned, some with hood moulds. In the extension is a re-set datestone.
11, 12 and 13 Hodgson Fold; 53.81613°N 1.74442°W	—	17th century	A house that was later altered, extended, and divided. It is in gritstone and sandstone, with quoins, and a stone slate roof with saddlestones and shaped kneelers. The windows are mullioned, there is a porch with a datestone, and a later porch from the 19th century.
14 Hodgson Fold and barn 53.81617°N 1.74466°W	—	17th century (or earlier)	The barn was largely rebuilt in the 18th century, and the house was altered in the 19th century. They are in sandstone, the front of the house is rendered, and the roof is in stone slate. The house has quoins and a gabled front, it contains a mix of sash and casement windows, and at the rear are two-light mullioned windows. The main door of the barn has a quoined surround, and there is a four-light mullioned window.
17 and 18 Hodgson Fold and barn 53.81628°N 1.74429°W	—	17th century	Two houses with a barn to the rear that were altered in the 18th century. They are in sandstone with quoins and a stone slate roof. There are two storeys, the front is gabled, the doorways have squared jambs, and the windows are mullioned. The corner of No. 18 is splayed and the ground floor is curved.
Walnut Tree Farmhouse and Walnut Cottage; 53.81128°N 1.75188°W	—	17th or early 18th century	The farmhouse and cottage are in sandstone with some gritstone, and have quoins, stone slate roofs, and mullioned windows. The farmhouse has two storeys, parapet copings on shaped kneelers, and at the rear is a mullioned and transomed stair window. The cottage is lower, with one storey at the rear and two on the front.
Former doorway and wall, Peel Park; 53.80938°N 1.74425°W		1705–07	The former doorway has been moved from Bradford Hall. It is in sandstone, and has panelled pilaster strips, and an architrave with consoles carrying a broken scrolled pediment with a coat of arms in the tympanum. Flanking it is a wall with rusticated quoins, and a swept Dutch gable with a pineapple finial. In the wall is a niche containing a scrolled framed cartouche with an inscription.
Ivy Place; 53.81881°N 1.73541°W	—	Mid 18th century	A pair of sandstone houses with quoins, a stone slate roof, and two storeys. The windows are mullioned, the doorway to No. 1 has squared jambs, and No. 2 has a gabled porch above which is a vertical bull's eye window.
241 and 243 Idle Road; 53.81372°N 1.73348°W	—	Late 18th century	A pair of sandstone cottages with quoins, a stone slate roof with saddlestones, and two storeys. The doorways have squared surrounds, there is one single-light window, one altered window, and the other windows are mullioned with two lights.
34 Bolton Lane and barn 53.81120°N 1.75218°W	—	Late 18th to early 19th century	A farmhouse with a cottage added towards the road and a barn at the rear. They are in sandstone and have stone slate roofs with saddlestones on the gable ends. The house has two storeys, a doorway with a plain surround and mullioned windows. The barn contains a large doorway with a deep lintel.
Bolton House; 53.81045°N 1.74218°W	—	Early 19th century	A sandstone house on a plinth, with quoins, a sill band, a moulded cornice, a parapet, and a stone slate roof. There are two storeys, a symmetrical front of five bays, and a lower service wing to the east. The doorway has paired pilasters and an entablature, the windows have moulded architraves, and on the west front is a bow window. The service wing has a hipped roof, five bays, and sash windows.
Hodgson Fold Barn; 53.81624°N 1.74400°W	—	Early 19th century	The barn is in sandstone with bracketed eaves and a stone slate roof. The corners are bevelled.
Statue of Sir Robert Peel; 53.80839°N 1.74337°W		1855	The statue of Sir Robert Peel is by William Behnes, and was moved from its original position to Peel Park in 1957. The statue is in lead and depicts a standing figure in 19th-century dress. It stands on a circular stone drum with a cornice inscribed with "PEEL" and the name of the sculptor.
Bolton First School; 53.81144°N 1.74585°W		c. 1860	The school is in stone, on a chamfered plinth, with quoins, and a slate roof with coped gables, and is in Early English style. There is an L-shaped plan, with the school to the left and a house to the right. The school has a single storey, gables, windows and a doorway with pointed arches, and dormers. The house has two storeys, a doorway with a four-centred arch and flat-headed windows. The boundary wall has rounded coping, and contains two gateways flanked by chamfered gate piers with round heads and Celtic crosses.
Beaumont Memorial Fountain; 53.80601°N 1.74292°W		1861	A drinking fountain at the south end of Peel Park, it is in stone with red granite corner shafts, and in Baroque style. At the base are arches holding basins, and above are arched panels containing floral and leaf carving. At the top is a short spire with carved heads.
Bolton Road Lodge, gate piers and gates, Peel Park; 53.81059°N 1.74534°W		1861	The lodge at the entrance to the park is in sandstone, with deep bracketed eaves, and a slate roof. It is in Italianate style, there are two storeys, and a front of three bays, the middle bay projecting and gabled. The middle bay contains a canted bay window, and above it is a pedimented window. There is another bay window in the right return, with a round-arched window above, and the doorway has pilasters. The gate piers have vermiculated rustication and corniced tops, the pedestrian gates have spear-headed rails and the carriage gates are more ornate.
Cliffe Road Lodge, gate piers and gates, Peel Park; 53.80582°N 1.74344°W	—	1861	The lodge at the entrance to the park is in sandstone, with deeply modillioned eaves, and a slate roof. It is in Italianate style, there are two storeys, the upper floor is inset, and a single-storey wing projects toward the drive. The windows are paired with round-arched heads, and sills on consoles. The gate piers have vermiculated rustication and corniced tops, the pedestrian gates have spear-headed rails and the carriage gates are more ornate.
Drinking fountain, Peel Park; 53.80974°N 1.74034°W		1861	The drinking fountain is in stone and in the form of a baldacchino in Classical style. It is enclosed by Corinthian columns on angled pedestals linked by round arches with keystones carved as heads, with bull rush moulding in the spandrels. On the top is a dome with a ball finial, and the fountain is in the form of a vase. The whole is set in a parapeted terrace with pineapple finials.
Statues of Autumn and Spring; 53.80847°N 1.74386°W		1869	The statue of Autumn is the earlier, the statue of Spring dating from 1877. They are depict figures in the form of Roman matrons standing on inscribed square pedestals.
9 and 10 Hodgson Fold; 53.81602°N 1.74419°W	—	c. 1870	A pair of semi-detached houses in sandstone with chamfered quoins, deep modillioned eaves, and a hipped slate roof. They are in Italianate style, with two storeys and four bays. The doorways have cornices on consoles, in the ground floor are canted bay windows, the upper floor contains paired round-headed windows, and there are dormers with curved gables.
St James' Church; 53.81241°N 1.74152°W		1876–77	The church is built in sandstone, and consists of a nave with a clerestory, north and south aisles, a north transept, a chancel, and a northwest steeple. The steeple has a tower that incorporates a north porch, and has buttresses and a broach spire with lucarnes. There are paired lancet windows along the nave, a five-light west window, and circular windows in the clerestory and the transept.
