= Bradford City Park =

West Yorkshire public area

Coordinates: 53.79260°N 1.75425°W

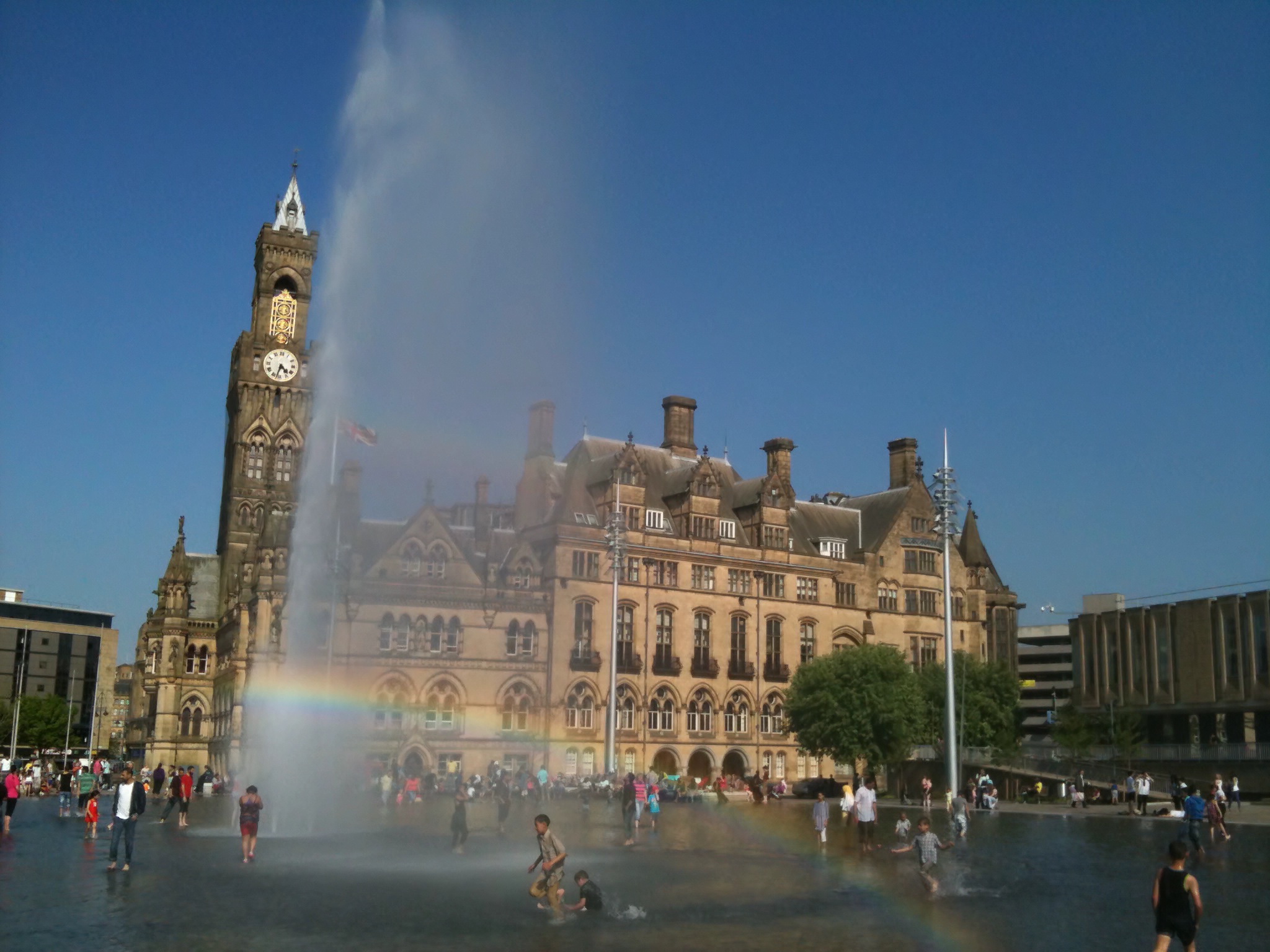
Sunny day at the City Park

City Park is a public space in the centre of Bradford, West Yorkshire. It is centred on the Grade I listed Bradford City Hall. The city park comprises three main areas, located on each side of the triangular City Hall site.

The city park was part of the 'masterplan' for Bradford city centre, a regeneration project first begun in 2003. Several revisions were made to the original plans. Funding was announced by the City Council in July 2009 and work was begun in December 2009.

In 2012, City Park was awarded the title of best Place in the UK and Ireland by the Academy of Urbanism.

== Component areas ==
To the east of the City Hall is the Norfolk Gardens area. As part of the renovations to City Park an underused concrete footbridge was removed and a new bus canopy was installed. In front of City Hall is Centenary Square. This area was extensively landscaped and now comprises raised lawns, seating and a large area of stone sets. This area is used for exhibition space and market stalls during the European markets. The north-western corner of the park is the mirror pool and its surrounds. Construction of this section begun in 2011 and was officially opened on 24 March 2012 with an all-day celebratory event featuring parkour, fireworks, balloons and other attractions.

=== Centenary Square ===
Centenary Square contains a leisure facility comprising bars, restaurants and a coffee shop. It has a large amount of outdoor seating which gives unrivaled views of the City Hall and mirror pool. Bradford 1 Gallery (an art gallery) and Impressions Gallery (a contemporary photography gallery) are also part of the Centenary Square development.

=== Mirror pool and pavilion ===
The mirror pool, with the City Hall in the background

The mirror pool contains the highest fountain in any British city, shooting water up to 100 ft (30m) into the air. In addition there are more than 100 smaller fountains, laser light projectors and loud speakers.

Through the middle of the mirror pool is a slightly raised Y-shaped walkway which allows visitors to pass over the pool in relative dryness. Access to the water is encouraged and there are 40 low-powered play fountains at the pavilion end of the pool.

Each morning the fountain produces a mist effect before the pool fills. At dusk a light show begins and continues until the pool is drained overnight.

The water features in the mirror pool were constructed by Birse Civil Engineering. Water in the pool is in part supplied from a 787-foot (240m) deep borehole. The capacity of the pool is about 600,000L and will be about 10 inches (25 cm) deep at the deepest parts, these features were designed and installed by Fountains Workshop Ltd. The contract was administered by EC Harris LLP, now part of Arcadis. The civil's outline design was undertaken by Arup, The landscaping design was by Gillespies, in conjunction with Sturgeon North Architects.
