= Bolton and Undercliffe =

Electoral ward in West Yorkshire, England

Coordinates: 53.81°N 1.73°W

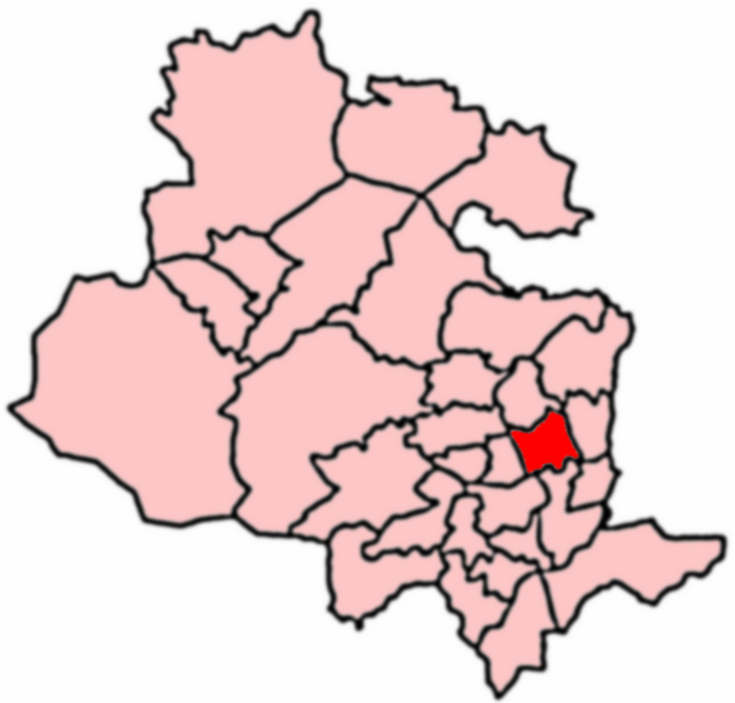
- 2004 Boundaries of Bolton and Undercliffe Ward

- Location within West Yorkshire
- Population: 16,365 2011 census
- OS grid reference: SE175350
- Metropolitan borough: City of Bradford
- Metropolitan county: West Yorkshire
- Region: Yorkshire and the Humber
- Country: England
- Sovereign state: United Kingdom
- Post town: BRADFORD
- Postcode district: BD2
- Dialling code: 01274
- Police: West Yorkshire
- Fire: West Yorkshire
- Ambulance: Yorkshire
- UK Parliament: Bradford East
- Councillors: Cllr Rachel Sunderland (Liberal Democrats); Cllr Suhail Choudhry (Labour); Cllr Si Cunningham

Bolton and Undercliffe is an electoral ward in the City of Bradford Metropolitan District Council, England. The population of the ward at the 2011 Census was 16,365. Bolton and Undercliffe covers the area east of Bradford Beck, between Shipley and Wrose to the north and central Bradford to the south. It is a largely urban area.

== Bolton ==
Bolton was a former village north of Bradford, but merged with Bradford in the 19th century. Bolton is made up of localities such as Bolton Woods, Ashbourne and Bolton Outlanes.

Bolton refers from Old English bothl/boōl-tun "village with buildings". The name was recorded as Boltetone in 1186.

=== Landmarks ===
There are a number of listed buildings in Bolton. On Idle Road in Bolton there is Ivy Hall, a small 17th century hall and Ivy Place, a mid-18th-century house now subdivided. Down Myers Lane (formerly named Owl Lane) in Bolton is Hodgson Fold, a group of 17th-century buildings. On Bolton Lane there is Walnut Cottage and the 18th century Walnut Tree Farmhouse and barn. Also on Bolton Lane is Bolton First School, a church school dating from circa 1860. On Lister Lane is Bolton House a former modest country house, and there are listed park lodges, memorials and sculptures in Peel Park.

In Wrose, Bolton Old Hall is a timber framed building largely rebuilt in 1672, with an attached cottage.

There are some five public houses scattered throughout Bolton and in the north west of Bolton is Bolton Woods Quarry, a large stone quarry near Gaisby.

Churches

On Bolton Road is the Grade II listed Church of Saint James and Bolton Methodist Church is further up Bolton Road in Bolton.

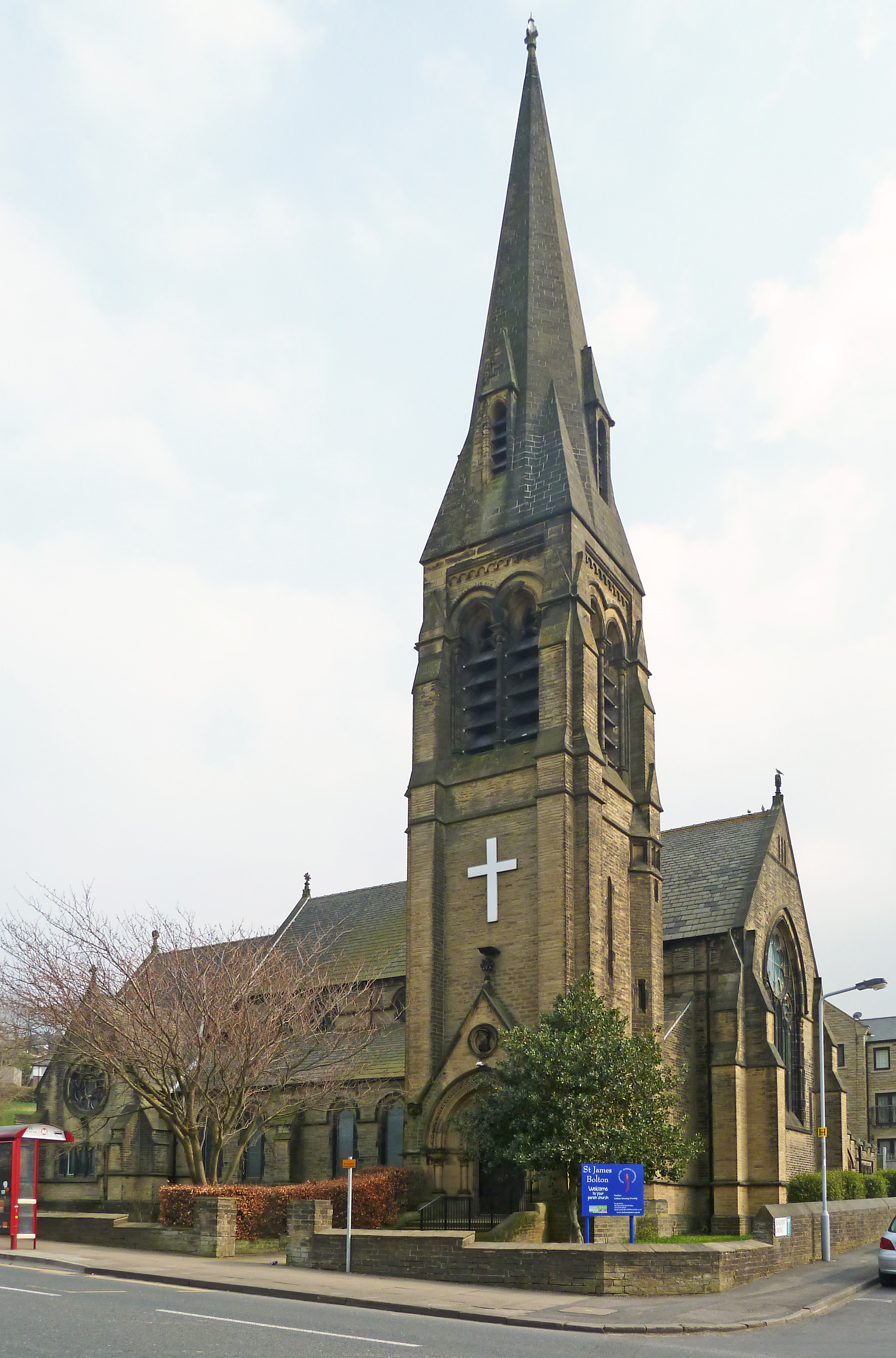
Saint James's Church,^{*} Bolton Road

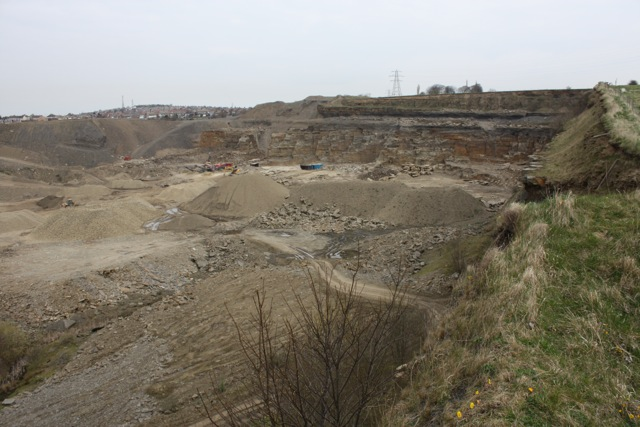
Bolton Woods Quarry

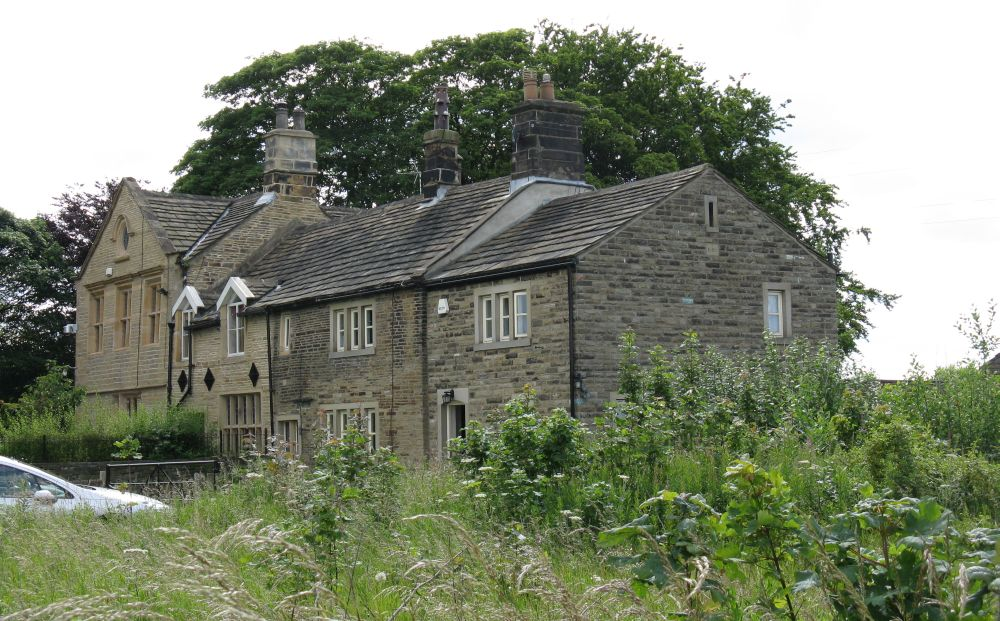
Bolton Old Hall, Wrose^{*}
^{*}listed building

== Undercliffe ==
Undercliffe means "below the cliff", referring to a village below a hill-spur. The name was recorded as Indreclif in 1038. Over time, Undercliffe has moved uphill and encroached into Eccleshill.

=== History ===
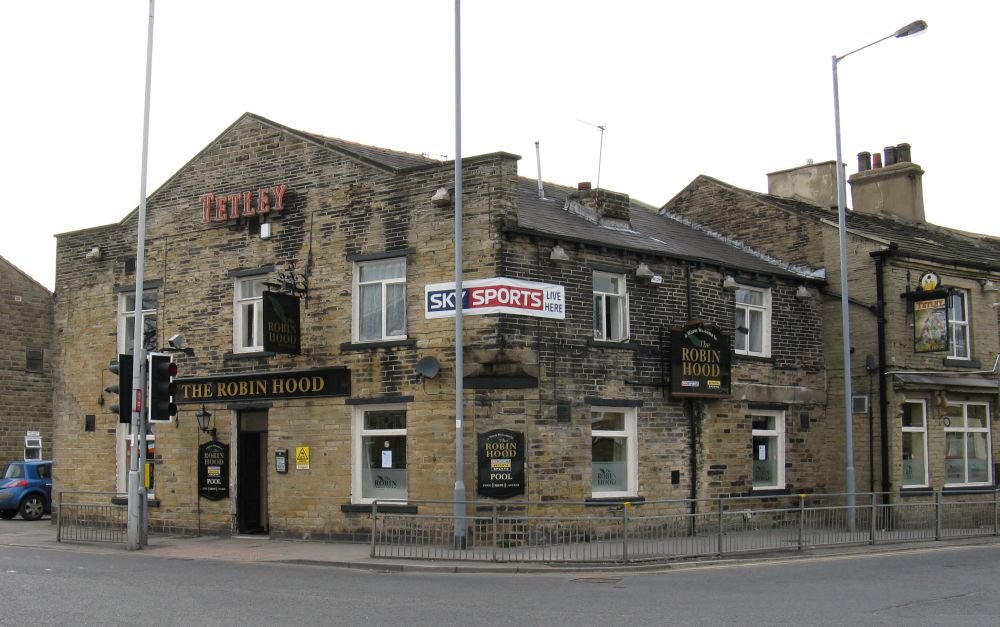
The Robin Hood public house.

The Dudley Hill to Killinghall turnpike of 1804 came through Undercliffe, and the former Robin Hood public house was a toll office for the turnpike. The turnpike still exists in the area as Killinghall Road to Bradford Moor and as Harrogate Road after a name change from Killinghall Road.

Cinema history

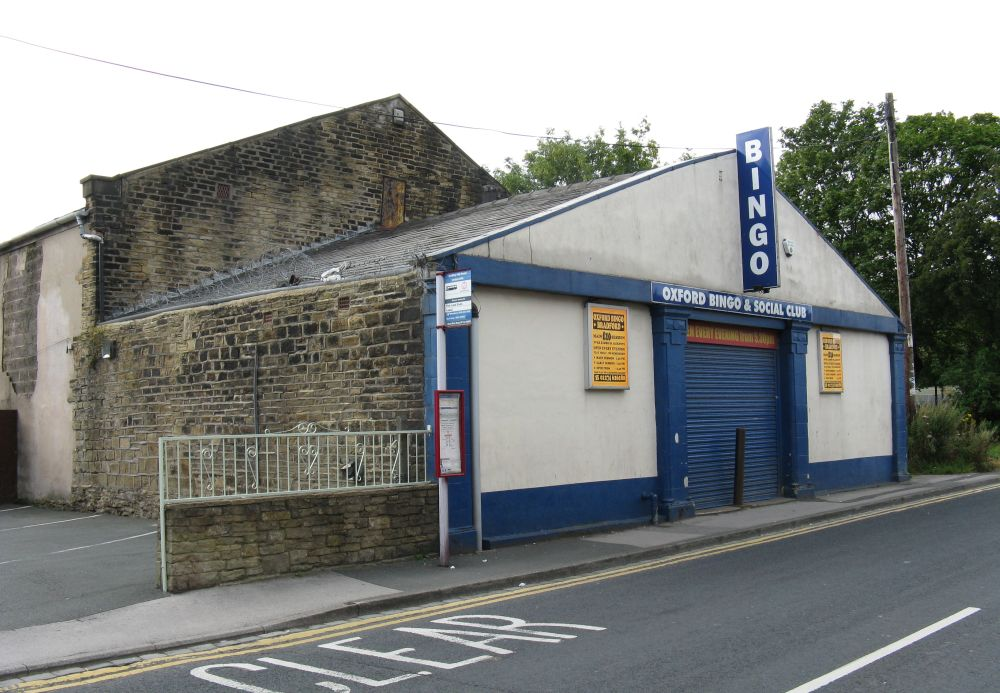
The former Oxford Cinema, demolished 2021

The 750 seat purpose-built Oxford Cinema on Dudley Hill Road was of a stone construction, and opened in 1914. Sound was installed by 1930 and it closed briefly again in 1955 for refurbishment. In 1962 it became a bingo club for three days of the week and a cinema the rest. It closed temporarily for alterations in 1965 but closed permanently as a cinema early the next year reopening as a bingo club, now the Oxford Bingo and Social Club. The bingo hall was destroyed in a fire in 2021 during a COVID-19 lock-down and quickly demolished.

The Coronet Cinema on Otley Road near Peel Park was purpose-built and opened in 1923. For many years it was known as the Coronet Picture House. Sound was installed around 1930 and a new wide screen in 1954. The cinema suffered a serious fire in 1955 and after recovering closed finally in 1958. The building was stripped and re-purposed as a wholesale food distribution warehouse but was destroyed by fire in 2003 and had to be quickly demolished. A terrace of new houses now stands on the site.

=== Landmarks ===
In the south of Undercliffe is Peel Park a public park named after prime minister Sir Robert Peel. Also in the south of Undercliffe is Bradford (Undercliffe) Cemetery.

The houses/small mansions of Guy's Cliffe on nearby Undercliffe Lane, dating from circa 1850, are listed buildings, as are several memorials in Undercliffe Cemetery.

There is only one public house remaining in Undercliffe since the loss of the Hare and Hounds, the Green Man and the Robin Hood.

Churches

On Otley Road stands Saint Andrew's Methodist Church and Saint Augustine's Church.

=== Sports ===
Undercliffe Cricket Club, established in 1875, has a cricket ground on Intake Road near Fagley. Undercliffe joined the Bradford Cricket League when it was formed in 1903 with twelve clubs and is one of only two (Undercliffe and Bankfoot) of the inaugural twelve that are current members.

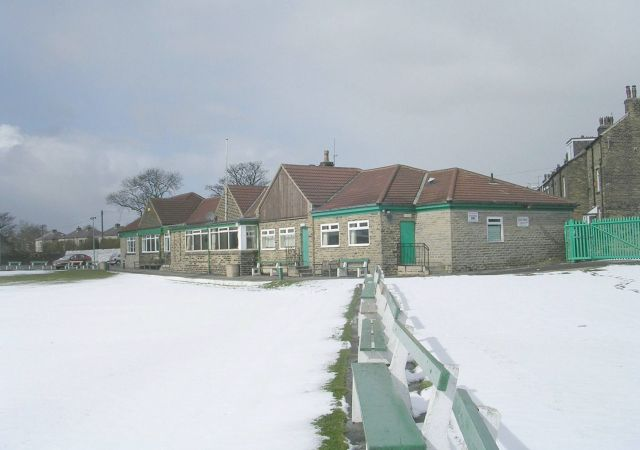
Undercliffe Cricket Club pavilion

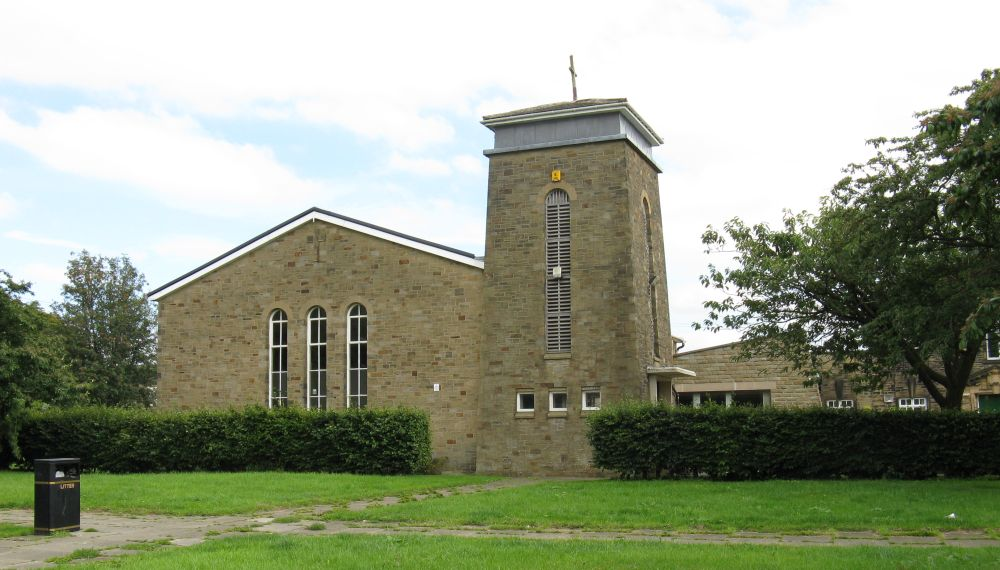
St Andrew's Methodist Church, Otley Road

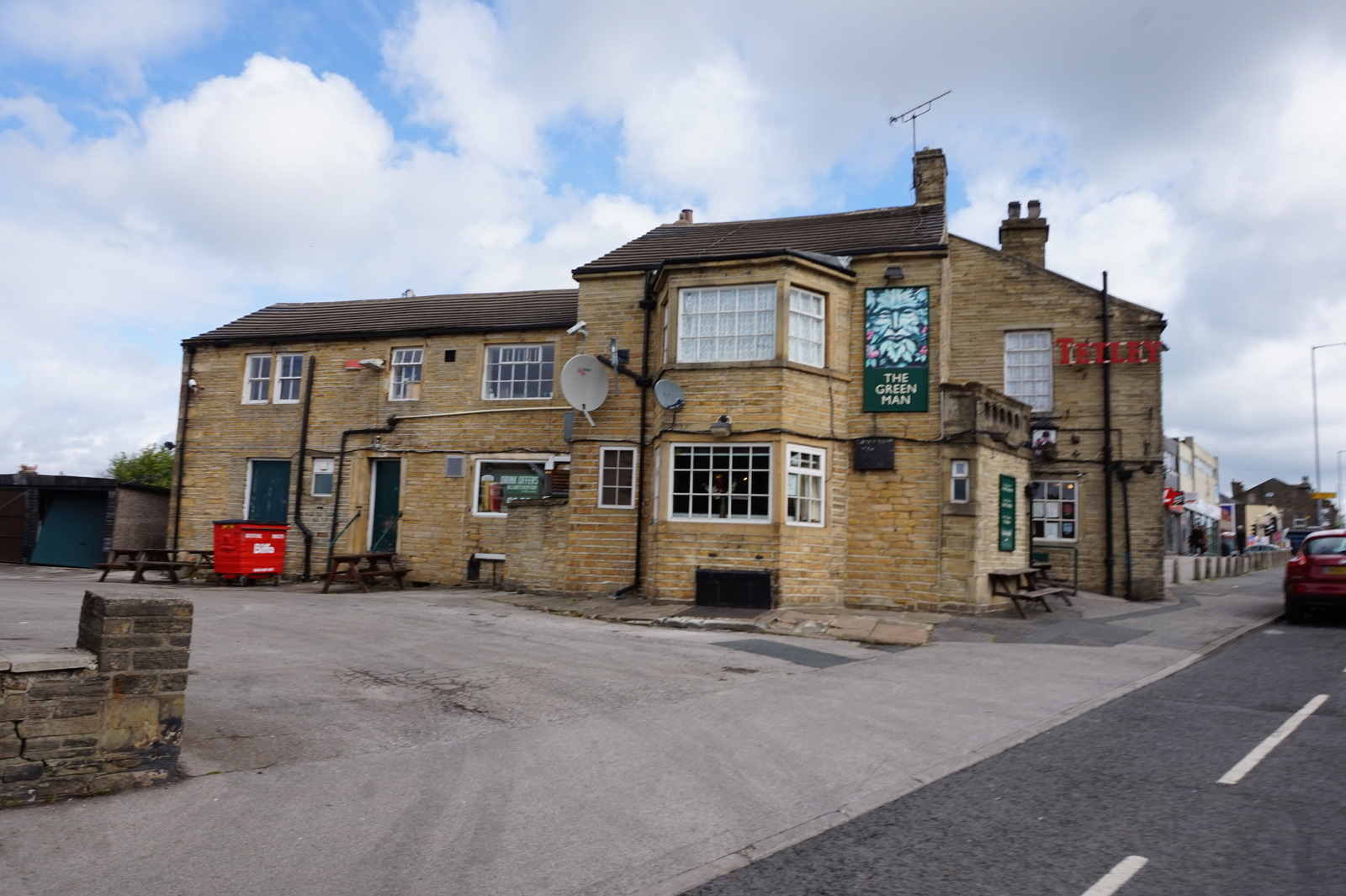
The Green Man public house, Otley Road

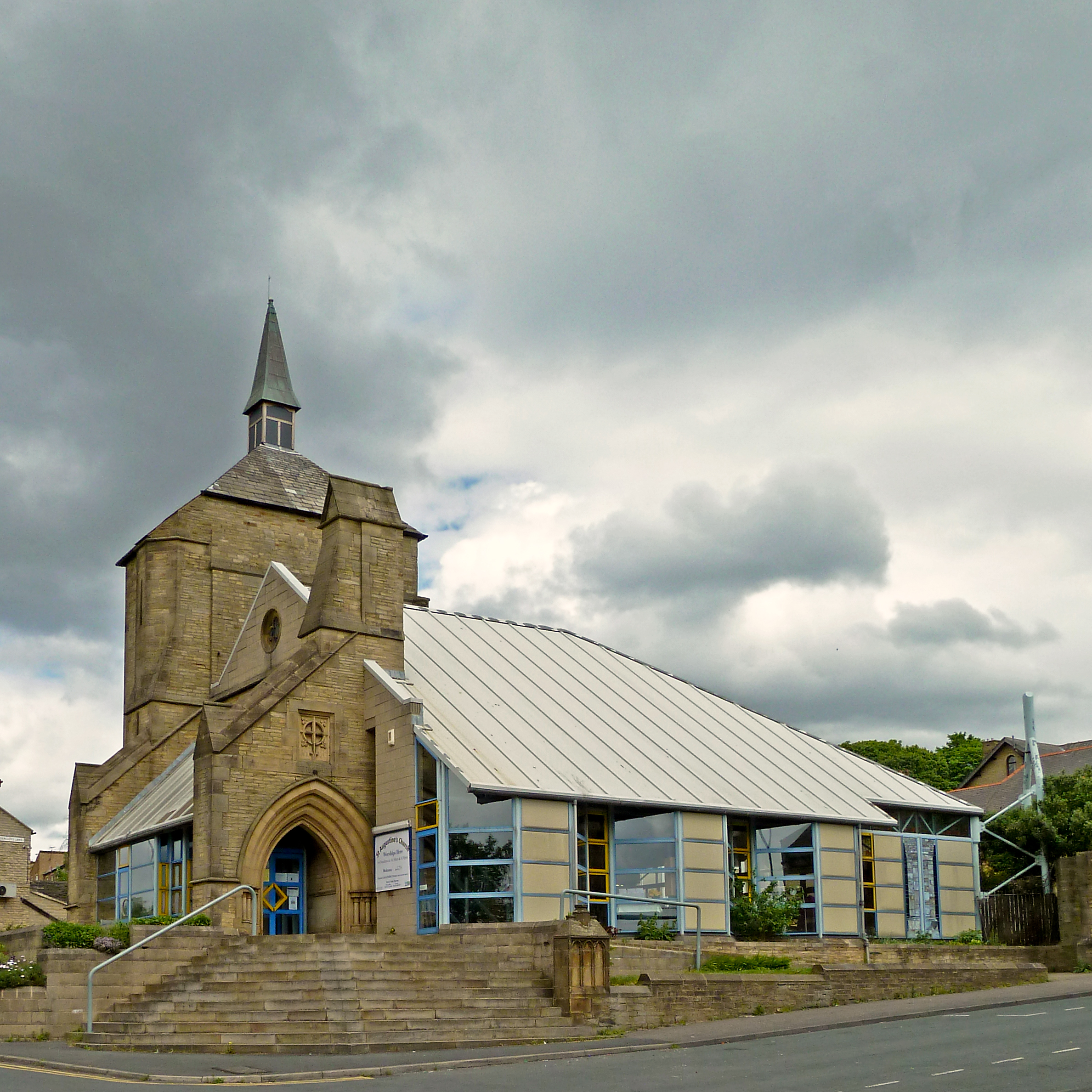
St Augustine's Church, Otley Road

== Councillors ==
As of 2026, Bolton and Undercliffe Ward is represented by two councillors from the Labour party: Suhail Choudhry and Md Zafar Niaz, and one from Reform UK: Jon Barras.

Election	Councillor	Councillor	Councillor
2004	David Weston Gray (Lib Dem)	Howard Middleton (Lib Dem)	Robert Christopher Hargreaves (Lib Dem)
2006	David Gray (Lib Dem)	Howard Middleton (Lib Dem)	Robert Christopher Hargreaves (Lib Dem)
2007	David Gray (Lib Dem)	Howard Middleton (Lib Dem)	Margaret Chadwick (Lib Dem)
2008	David Gray (Lib Dem)	Howard Middleton (Lib Dem)	Margaret Chadwick (Lib Dem)
2010	David Gray (Lib Dem)	Howard Middleton (Lib Dem)	Margaret Chadwick (Lib Dem)
2011	David Gray (Lib Dem)	Howard Middleton (Lib Dem)	Margaret Chadwick (Lib Dem)
2012	David Gray (Lib Dem)	Howard Middleton (Lib Dem)	Tracey Leeming (Lib Dem)
2014	Rachel Emma Sunderland (Lib Dem)	Howard Middleton (Lib Dem)	Tracey Leeming (Lib Dem)
2015	Rachel Sunderland (Lib Dem)	Michael Andrew Stelling (Lib Dem)	Tracey Leeming (Lib Dem)
2016	Rachel Sunderland (Lib Dem)	Michael Stelling (Lib Dem)	David Ward (Independent)
2018	Ian Greenwood (Labour)	Michael Stelling (Lib Dem)	David Ward (Independent)
2019	Ian Greenwood (Labour)	Suhail Choudhry (Labour)	David Ward (Independent)
2021	Ian Greenwood (Labour)	Suhail Choudhry (Labour)	Simon Cunningham (Labour)
2022	Julie Humphreys (Labour)	Suhail Choudhry (Labour)	Simon Cunningham (Labour)
2023	Julie Humphreys (Labour)	Suhail Choudhry (Labour)	Simon Cunningham (Labour)
2024	Julie Humphreys (Labour)	Suhail Choudhry (Labour)	David Ward (Independent)
2026	Jon Barras (Reform)	Suhail Choudhry (Labour)	Md Zafar Niaz (Labour)

indicates seat up for re-election.

== Notable people ==
James Joseph Magennis was awarded a Victoria Cross in the Second World War for operations involving X-Craft midget submarines in attacks on Axis ships. He moved to live in Swain House in the 1960s.

Actor Edward Peel attended schools in Swain House. He appeared in the Dragonfire series of the science fiction series Doctor Who.

Barbara Jane Harrison, the first and, to date, only female recipient in peacetime of the George Cross medal for bravery, was born at a house on Kingsdale Crescent. A Bradford Civic Society blue plaque to commemorate Barbara was unveiled at Bradford City Hall in 2019 and installed near to Barbara's birthplace on Bolton Road, at the junction with Kingsdale Crescent.

Eva Leigh – a portraitist and silhouettist who was born in Undercliffe and worked as an artist in Harrogate, North Yorkshire.

== See also ==
- Listed buildings in Bradford (Bolton and Undercliffe Ward)
