= Listed buildings in Silsden =

Silsden is a civil parish in the metropolitan borough of the City of Bradford, West Yorkshire, England. It contains 63 listed buildings that are recorded in the National Heritage List for England. Of these, three are listed at Grade II*, the middle of the three grades, and the others are at Grade II, the lowest grade. The parish contains the town of Silsden and the surrounding countryside. Most of the listed buildings are houses, cottages and associated structures, farmhouses and farm buildings. The other listed buildings include an aqueduct for water supply and a tower involved with its construction, a canal aqueduct and warehouse, a footbridge, churches and associated structures, three milestones, and a former textile mill.

== Key ==
Grade	Criteria
II*	Particularly important buildings of more than special interest
II	Buildings of national importance and special interest

== Buildings ==
Name and location	Photograph	Date	Notes	Grade
Holden Gate Farmhouse; 53.89426°N 1.90077°W	—	Late 16th or early 17th century	The porch was added to the farmhouse in 1619. The house is in stone and has a stone slate roof with coped gables, kneelers, and a lantern finial on the right. There are two storeys, and in the front is a two-storey gabled porch that has a doorway with a moulded surround and a dated lintel. The inner doorway has a chamfered surround and composite jambs. There is also an inserted doorway with monolithic jambs. The windows are mullioned, with some mullions removed, and some have hood moulds.	II
Lane House and barn 53.93337°N 1.95401°W	—	Early 17th century	The house was extended in the 19th century, and the barn is dated 1672. They are in stone with quoins, and stone slate roofs with three different roof lines. There are two storeys, and the house has two doorways with monolithic jambs. The windows in the earlier part are mullioned, and in the later part they are sashes. At the rear is a semicircular-arched stair window with imposts and a keystone. The barn has five bays and a single aisle. In a portal of the aisle is a cart entry with a chamfered lintel, and there are two doorways. At the rear is a cart entry with a chamfered surround, composite jambs, and a monolithic lintel.	II
Low Edge Farmhouse and barn 53.94602°N 1.96258°W	—	Early 17th century	The barn was added to the farmhouse in the 18th century. The buildings are in stone with quoins, and a stone slate roof with coped gables and kneelers. The house has two storeys, a double depth plan, and a single-storey rear outshut. On the front is a two-storey gabled porch containing a doorway with a chamfered surround and tie-stone jambs. The windows are mullioned, with hood moulds on the ground floor. The barn to the right has an outshut with a catslide roof, a cart entry to the left, and three doorways with chamfered surrounds and composite jambs.	II
Barn east of Low Holden; 53.88749°N 1.91551°W	—	Early 17th century	The barn, which was extended in about 1768, is in stone with quoins, and a stone slate roof with coped gables and kneelers. There are two storeys and six bays. In the centre of the east front is a porch and a cart entry, and in the aisle to the left is a doorway with a tie-stone jamb. To the right are two rectangular vents, and a doorway with a chamfered surround and composite jambs. A flight of ten steps leads up to a doorway with chamfered jambs, and a cart entry with a dated and initialled monolithic lintel.	II
Foster Cliff North; 53.93432°N 1.94380°W	—	1631	A house that was extended in the 18th century, it is in stone, and has a stone slate roof with a coped gable on the left. There are two storeys and an L-shaped plan. The later part has quoins, a re-used dated doorway with a moulded surround, composite jambs and a Tudor arched lintel with sunken spandrels. In the older part is an inserted doorway with monolithic jambs. In both parts, most of the windows are mullioned, some with hood moulds, and at the rear are inserted sash windows.	II
Raikes Head Farmhouse; 53.92194°N 1.94690°W	—	Early to mid 17th century	The farmhouse was later extended at both ends. It is in stone, with quoins, and a stone slate roof with a coped gable and kneelers on the left. There are two storeys, and the original part has two bays. This part contains a doorway with a chamfered surround, composite jambs, and a deep lintel. The windows are mullioned with some mullions missing, and one window has a hood mould. To the left is a single-bay extension that has a doorway with composite jambs, and to the right is a cottage that has a central doorway with monolithic jambs and sash windows. On the right return are external steps leading to an upper floor doorway.	II
Low Bracken Hill; 53.91983°N 1.95084°W	—	1636	A stone house with quoins, and a roof of grey-brown Cumbrian slate with coped gables and kneelers. There are two storeys and a single-storey outshut. The main doorway has a chamfered surround, with composite jambs, and a dated and initialled Tudor arched lintel, to the left is a blocked doorway with tie-stone jambs, and at the rear is a doorway with monolithic jambs. The windows are mullioned, with some mullions removed, and some windows have hood moulds.	II
Barn, Holden Gate Farm; 53.89396°N 1.90085°W	—	1641	The barn is in stone with quoins, and a stone slate roof with coped gables, kneelers and a finial. There are six bays and an aisle. In the centre is a gabled porch with a cart entry with a semicircular arch and a chamfered surround, and in the gable is a datestone. In the angle are doorways with chamfered surrounds and composite jambs, one with a Tudor arched lintel. Elsewhere there are arrow-slit vents, more doorways, and windows.	II*
5 and 7 St Johns Close; 53.91321°N 1.93663°W	—	1646	A house in a terrace that has been divided. It is in stone with a stone slate roof, and has two storeys and two bays. The central doorway has a chamfered surround, composite jambs, and a dated lintel. To the right is an inserted doorway with tie-stone jambs. The windows are mullioned, with most mullions removed, and the windows in the ground floor have hood moulds.	II
Barn southeast of 20 Bradley Road; 53.91579°N 1.94015°W	—	17th century	The barn is aisled, and is in stone with quoins, a stone slate roof, two storeys and five bays. It contains a cart entry with timber posts and a lintel, and to the right is an inserted shop window. In the left return is a doorway with a chamfered surround and composite jambs, and a taking-indoor in the upper storey.	II
Cringles House Farmhouse; 53.93250°N 1.92727°W	—	17th century	The farmhouse was altered and extended in the 18th and 19th centuries. It is in stone with quoins, gutter brackets, and stone slate roofs with coped gables and kneelers. There are two storeys and a long range with four different rooflines. The main doorway has monolithic jambs and a porch with Doric columns, which was moved from St James' Church. Most of the windows are mullioned, with some mullions missing. At the rear is a doorway with monolithic jambs and a stair window.	II
Crow Trees Farmhouse; 53.94160°N 1.96232°W	—	Mid 17th century	A stone house with quoins, a moulded string course, and a stone slate roof with a coped gable and kneelers on the left. There are two storeys and a single-storey rear outshut. On the front is a two-storey gabled porch that has an arched doorway with a chamfered surround and composite jambs. The windows are mullioned with some blocked lights.	II
Greengate; 53.91524°N 1.93977°W	—	Mid 17th century	A house that was refronted in the 18th century and divided into two cottages in the 19th century. It is in stone with quoins and a stone slate roof. There are two storeys, a double-depth plan, and an outshut on the right. The central doorway and an inserted doorway to the right have monolithic jambs. Most of the windows are mullioned, with some mullions missing.	II
Townhead Farmhouse; 53.91857°N 1.93257°W	—	Mid 17th century	A stone farmhouse with quoins and a stone slate roof. There are two storeys, two bays, and a single-story rear outshut. The doorway at the right end has a chamfered surround and composite jambs. The windows are mullioned, including a six-light window with a hood mould to the left of the doorway.	II
North End Farmhouse and barn 53.91603°N 1.91092°W	—	Mid to late 17th century	A barn was added to the right of the original house, and another house to the left, in the 18th century. The buildings are in stone with quoins and stone slate roofs at three levels stepped up a hill. There are two storeys and an outshut at the rear of the original house. The original house has two doorways with composite jambs, one also with a chamfered surround, and the other with a Tudor arched lintel. Most of the windows are mullioned, some with hood moulds. The barn has two doorways with composite jambs on the front, and a segmental-arched cart entry at the rear. In the later house is a doorway with monolithic jambs, and most of the windows have been altered.	II
Far Stake Hill Barn; 53.92705°N 1.96668°W	—	Late 17th century	A stone barn with quoins, and a stone slate roof with coped gables and kneelers. There are three bays and an aisle. In the portal of the aisle is a cart entry with a wooden lintel. To the right is a doorway to a stable with a monolithic lintel and jambs, and to the left is a doorway with a chamfered surround and composite jambs. At the rear is a small doorway and a triangular vent.	II
Cottage west of High Cross Moor Farmhouse; 53.91526°N 1.95785°W	—	Late 17th century	The cottage, which was altered in the 19th century, is in stone with quoins, and a stone slate roof. There are two storeys and two bays. The central doorway has monolithic jambs, and the windows are mullioned, with two lights in the ground floor and three in the upper floor. To the right, and at right angles, is a former two-storey workshop with a doorway, window, and taking-in door.	II
Manor House and barn 53.93209°N 1.92798°W	—	Late 17th century	The barn was built in the 18th century and was joined to the house by an extension in the 19th century. The buildings are in stone and have stone slate roofs with coped gables and kneelers, and three different roof lines. The house has two storeys and contains mullioned windows, the extension to the left is taller, it has two bays, and contains a doorway with monolithic jambs, and sash windows. To the left is the barn, which is lower, and contains a segmental-arched cart entry.	II
Pear Tree Cottage; 53.91554°N 1.93815°W	—	Late 17th century	A pair of cottages that have been altered and combined. The building is in stone with stone slate roofs. There are two bays, the left bay has one storey, and the right bay has two storeys and a single-storey rear outshut. Each bay has a doorway with monolithic jambs, the left doorway converted into a window. There is one single-light window, and the other windows are mullioned.	II
The Grange; 53.91170°N 1.91756°W	—	Late 17th century	A stone house that has a stone slate roof with a coped gable, kneelers and a lantern finial on the left. There are two storeys, three bays, and a single-storey rear outshut. The central doorway has a chamfered surround and tie-stone jambs, the ground floor windows are modern replacements, and elsewhere are mullioned windows. The outshut has a kneeler with a crocketed finial.	II
18–26 Bradley Road; 53.91599°N 1.94042°W		1682	A house, formerly the Old Hall, divided into five dwellings. It is in stone with quoins and a stone slate roof with coped gables and kneelers. There are two storeys, a double depth plan, three bays with gables at the front and the rear, and a rear extension and a lean-to. The original doorway has a chamfered surround, composite jambs, and a decorated and dated Tudor arched lintel, and there is a later inserted doorway. The windows on the front are mullioned and transomed with hood moulds.	II*
High Bracken Hill Farmhouse; 53.93617°N 1.96295°W	—	1691	The house was refronted and a porch added in the 19th century. It is in stone, the front rendered, with quoins, gutter brackets, and a stone slate roof with coped gables and kneelers. There are two storeys, two bays, and an outshut on the right. In the centre is a flat-roofed porch that has a doorway with an architrave and a cornice. In the corner to the right is a doorway with a re-set datestone above, and the windows are mullioned.	II
3 and 5 Town Head; 53.91787°N 1.93390°W		1696	A house later divided, it is in stone with quoins, and a stone slate roof with a coped gable and a shaped kneeler to the left. There are two storeys, and a single-storey rear outshut. The original doorway has a chamfered surround, composite jambs, and a dated Tudor arched lintel, above which is a circular window. To the right is an inserted doorway with monolithic jambs. The windows are mullioned, those in the ground floor with hood moulds.	II
Walton Hole Farmhouse and barn 53.93941°N 1.93749°W	—	1719	The barn was added in the early 18th century, and it incorporates 17th-century material. The building has a plinth, quoins, and a stone slate roof with a coped gable on the left. There are two storeys, and the house has two bays, and a single-storey dairy at the rear. The doorway at the right end has a chamfered surround, tie-stone jambs, and a lintel with a carved shield containing initials and the date. The barn to the left has a segmental-arched cart entry with voussoirs, and doorways with chamfered jambs.	II
52 St Johns Street and 1-3 St Johns Close; 53.91319°N 1.93684°W	—	Early 18th century	A house that has been much altered and divided, it is in stone, partly rendered, and has a stone slate roof with a coped gable and kneelers on the left. There are two storeys. On the front are two mullioned windows, and the other windows and the three doorways have been inserted.	II
Outbuilding, Far Gill Grange Farm; 53.90963°N 1.89015°W	—	Early 18th century	The outbuilding is in stone, with quoins, a stone slate roof with coped gables and kneelers, and one storey. It contains two doorways with chamfered surrounds and composite jambs, and in the side walls are small windows.	II
Kiln Hill Cottage; 53.91113°N 1.91998°W	—	Early to mid 18th century	A stone cottage with quoins, and a stone slate roof with a coped gable and kneelers on the left. There are two storeys and two bays. The doorway has a chamfered surround, composite jambs, and a Tudor arched lintel. The windows are mullioned, with some mullions removed.	II
Doubler Stones House and barn 53.91328°N 1.89135°W	—	Second quarter of the 18th century	The house is in stone, with quoins, and a stone slate roof with coped gables and kneelers. There are two storeys, a double-depth plan, and two bays. On the front is a porch, and a doorway with a chamfered surround. The windows on the front are stepped with three-lights and mullions, and at the rear is a round-arched stair window. The barn to the left is lower, and has five bays. It contains a tall cart entry with composite jambs, and a doorway with a quoined lintel.	II
Sycamore House and barn 53.91198°N 1.92433°W	—	Second quarter of the 18th century	The house and attached barn are in stone, and have a stone slate roof with a coped gable and kneelers on the left. There are two storeys, and the house has two bays. In the centre is a doorway with composite jambs and a chamfered surround that rises to form a false ogee lintel. Some windows are mullioned, and others are sashes. The barn contains a segmental-arched cart entry.	II
Ashwell House, barn and stables 53.91229°N 1.92465°W	—	1739	The house and farm buildings are in stone, with quoins and stone slate roofs. The house has two storeys and three bays, a moulded string course, and coped gables with kneelers. The main doorway has a Tudor arched head, a chamfered surround, and composite jambs, one dated, and there is an inserted doorway with monolithic jambs. The windows are sashes with two lights and mullions. The barn is set forward and joined to the house by a single-storey extension. It contains two large cart entries with composite jambs, a doorway with a chamfered surround and a quoined lintel, and square vents. Attached to the left is a two-storey stable that has three doorways with composite jambs, and rectangular vents.	II
Barn, Hole Farm; 53.92316°N 1.95849°W	—	Mid 18th century	A stone barn with quoins, a stone slate roof with kneelers, and three bays. In the centre is a segmental-arched cart entry with composite jambs and a keystone. The left return contains two doorways with composite jambs and quoined chamfered lintels, and in the gable end is a dovecote.	II
Barn northwest of Old Hall Farmhouse; 53.91574°N 1.93965°W	—	Mid 18th century	The barn is in stone with a stone slate roof. On the front is a projecting porch with a catslide roof containing a segmental-arched cart entry. To the right are rectangular vents and a doorway with a quoined lintel. On the right of the barn is a stable, and on its right return is a flight of steps leading up to a hayloft.	II
Rough Holden Farmhouse and barn 53.90106°N 1.90556°W	—	Mid 18th century (probable)	The barn is older than the farmhouse, which dates from the 19th century. They are in stone with quoins, a stone slate roof with a coped gable and kneelers on the left, and two storeys. The house has two bays, a doorway with tie-stone jambs, and mullioned windows. The large barn to the left has an aisle with a portal containing a cart entry, a doorway with composite jambs, and rectangular vents. To the left is a blocked doorway with a chamfered surround and double tie-stone jambs.	II
Barn, Tomling Cote Farm; 53.90799°N 1.91366°W	—	Mid 18th century	A stone barn with quoins, and a stone slate roof, with coped gable on the right and kneelers on both gables. There are five bays, and in the centre is a large segmental-arched cart entry with composite jambs. To the right is a doorway with tie-stone jambs and a quoined lintel, and at the rear is a doorway with a chamfered surround.	II
43 Kirkgate; 53.91311°N 1.93770°W	—	1755	A stone cottage, rendered on the side, with quoins, and a stone slate roof. There are two storeys and two bays. The doorway on the right has monolithic jambs, and the windows contain altered glazing. Between the upper floor windows is a recessed and initialled date plaque.	II
7 and 9 Chapel Street; 53.91616°N 1.93691°W	—	1760	A pair of cottages with quoins, gutter brackets, and a stone slate roof with a kneeler on the right gable. There are two storeys and three bays. The middle bay contains two doorways with monolithic jambs, the right doorway with a dated lintel, and there is a single-light window above. In the outer bays are two-light mullioned windows.	II
3 and 4 Stirling Street; 53.91579°N 1.93673°W	—	1762	A house, later divided, it is in stone with quoins and a stone slate roof with coped gables. There are two storeys and two bays. The left doorway has a chamfered surround, composite jambs, and a dated lintel, the inserted doorway to the right has monolithic jambs, and the windows are mullioned.	II
Upper Hayhills Farmhouse and barn 53.92699°N 1.94826°W	—	Mid to late 18th century	A former laithe house, it is in stone with quoins, and a stone slate roof with a coped gable and kneelers on the left. There are two storeys, the house has a single bay, and the barn is lower and to the right. In the house are mullioned windows, and the barn has a projecting aisle forming a porch containing a doorway with tie-stone jambs. In the barn is a cart entry with quoined angles and a wooden lintel.	II
9, 11, 13 and 15 St John's Street; 53.91233°N 1.93707°W	—	Late 18th century	A row of stone cottages, partly back to back, with a stone slate roof. There are two storeys at the front, three at the rear, a T-shaped plan, and three bays. The doorways each have monolithic jambs and a fanlight, and the windows are sashes.	II
2 Town Head; 53.91797°N 1.93395°W	—	Late 18th century	A stone cottage with quoins, and a stone slate roof with a coped gable and kneelers to the right. There are two storeys, a double-depth plan, and one bay. The doorway has tie-stone jambs.	II
Canal aqueduct 53.91140°N 1.93699°W		Late 18th century	The aqueduct carries the Leeds and Liverpool Canal over Hainsworth Road and Silsden Beck. It is in stone, and consists of a semicircular arch over the beck with a segmental relieving arch above it. Over the road is a basket arch, and there are three buttresses on the south side. The aqueduct has a band and a coped parapet.	II
Cowburn Beck Farmhouse; 53.94266°N 1.94338°W		Late 18th century	The farmhouse is in stone, rendered at the front, and has a stone slate roof with coped gables and kneelers, and two storeys. The doorway has monolithic jambs and a rectangular fanlight, above it is a single-light window, and the other windows are mullioned with two lights.	II
Bee boles, Cowburn Beck Farm; 53.94248°N 1.94366°W	—	Late 18th century (probable)	The bee boles are in a wall, and consist of four square shallow recesses with monolithic lintels and sills.	II
Footbridge north of Silsden Bridge; 53.90323°N 1.94270°W		Late 18th century (probable)	The footbridge crosses Silsden Beck and is in stone. It consists of a single arch with voussoirs, and a parapet with large copings.	II
Howden House Cottage; 53.89819°N 1.92603°W	—	Late 18th century	The cottage is in stone with a stone slate roof, two storeys, and two bays. The central doorway has tie-stone jambs, and the windows are mullioned with two lights.	II
Croft House; 53.91555°N 1.93918°W	—	1787	A stone house with quoins, and a stone slate roof with coped gables and kneelers. There are two storeys and two bays. The central doorway has monolithic jambs and an open porch, and above it is an arched niche with an impost and keystone containing a datestone. The windows are sashes, to the left they have single lights, and to the right they have two lights and mullions.	II
Old Hall Farmhouse and forecourt 53.91556°N 1.93947°W	—	1793	A stone house with quoins, square gutter brackets, and a stone slate roof with coped gables and kneelers. There are two storeys, three bays, and an outshut on the left. The central doorway has monolithic jambs, and a triangular pediment with the date in the tympanum. The left bay contains two-light mullioned windows, in the right bay are single light windows, and at the rear is a central stair window. The outshut contains a doorway with a monolithic chamfered lintel. Attached to the right corner of the house is a wall that joins the wall running along the front of the garden which contains four circular columns with ball finials and railings.	II
Canal warehouse 53.91153°N 1.93858°W		Late 18th or early 19th century	The warehouse on the north side of the Leeds and Liverpool Canal is in stone with a stone slate roof. There are two storeys and three bays. In the centre is a wide doorway with tie-stone jambs and a monolithic lintel. The windows are mullioned with three lights.	II
Crossmoor Farmhouse; 53.91401°N 1.95601°W	—	Late 18th or early 19th century	An ale-house, later a private house, it was extended in the 19th century. The building is in stone with quoins, gutter brackets, and a stone slate roof. There are three storeys, a symmetrical front of three bays, and the extension to the right. In the centre are paired doorways with monolithic outer jambs, a shared composite centre jamb, and a moulded cornice. Above the doorways is an arched and initialled date plaque, and the windows are sashes with plain surrounds.	II
Pair of cottages off Chapel Street; 53.91626°N 1.93708°W	—	Late 18th or early 19th century	The cottages are in stone with quoins and a stone slate roof. There are two storeys and four bays. Each cottage has a doorway on the left with tie-stone jambs and quoined lintels. To the right is a window with a plain surround, and in the upper floor are sash windows.	II
St James' Church; 53.91421°N 1.93822°W		1815	Alterations were made to the church in 1876, including the addition of a chancel, and in 1896, the tower was heightened and a needle spire was added. The church is built in stone with a Welsh slate roof, ridge tiles, and a lead spire, and it is in Gothic Revival style. It consists of a nave, a south porch, a chancel, and a west tower. The tower is slender, it has three stages, and contains a doorway, a clock face on each side, and a shaped parapet, and the spirelet is surmounted by a weathervane. The east window has four lights with quatrefoils.	II
Nail-maker's workshop, High Cross Moor Farm; 53.91516°N 1.95766°W	—	Early 19th century	The workshop is a small building with one storey and one bay. The front is gabled and contains a doorway with tie-stone jambs, those to the left forming quoins. In the front and in the left return is a rectangular window with altered glazing.	II
1, 2 and 3 Nicolson's Place; 53.91336°N 1.93824°W	—	Mid 19th century	A house incorporating earlier material, it was later divided into three. It is in stone with quoins and stone slate roof. There are two storeys and three bays. The left bay projects and contains a doorway with monolithic jambs and a large window with a plain surround. In the middle bay is a doorway with a chamfered surround, tie-stone jambs, and a Tudor arched lintel, and the right bay contains a doorway with monolithic jambs. The windows in the upper floor are sashes, and in the ground floor they have been converted into casement windows.	II
33 Keighley Road; 53.91062°N 1.93881°W		1838	A stone house with a moulded eaves cornice and a stone slate roof. There are two storeys and a symmetrical front of three bays. The central doorway has monolithic jambs, and a cornice on consoles. The windows on the front have altered glazing, and at the rear is a round-arched stair window with a keystone and impost blocks.	II
Canal Warehouse; 53.91121°N 1.93932°W	—	1852	The warehouse on the south side of the Leeds and Liverpool Canal, and later used for other purposes, is in stone and has a stone slate roof with coped gables and kneelers. There are three storeys, two bays on the front and three at the rear. On the front are two segmental-arched cart entries, the left one with a dated keystone, and the other blocked, a taking-in door, and stepped mullioned windows, with some lights blocked. At the rear are taking-in doors and square windows.	II
Old Tower; 53.93417°N 1.92618°W		c. 1854–60	A survey tower used in the construction of the Barden Aqueduct. It is in stone and circular, with a tapering base containing a doorway. Above this is a lancet window, and at the top are four rectangular windows.	II
Barden Aqueduct; 53.91540°N 1.91848°W	—	c. 1858	The aqueduct carries a water supply over Brunthwaite Brook. It is in stone, and consists of three segmental arches on piers with moulded imposts, and has voussoirs, a chamfered band, and a coped parapet. The abutments have cast iron railings with spearhead finials.	II
Milestone near Manor House Farm; 53.93062°N 1.92689°W		Mid to late 19th century	The milestone is on the east side of Bolton Road (A6034 road). It is in stone and cast iron, and has a triangular plan and a rounded top. The top is inscribed with "BLACKBURN ADDINGHAM & COCKING END ROAD" and "SILSDEN", and on the sides are the distances to Keighley, Addingham, Burnley and Ilkley.	II
Milestone opposite 79 Bolton Road; 53.91716°N 1.93321°W		Mid to late 19th century	The milestone is on the southeast side of Bolton Road (A6034 road). It is in stone and cast iron, and has a triangular plan and a rounded top. The top is inscribed with "BLACKBURN ADDINGHAM & COCKING END ROAD" and "SILSDEN", and on the sides are the distances to Keighley, Addingham, Burnley and Ilkley.	II
Milestone north of Silsden Bridge; 53.90448°N 1.94226°W		Mid to late 19th century	The milestone is on the west side of Keighley Road (A6034 road). It is in stone and cast iron, and has a triangular plan and a rounded top. The top is inscribed with "BLACKBURN ADDINGHAM & COCKING END ROAD" and "SILSDEN", and on the sides are the distances to Keighley, Addingham, Burnley and Ilkley.	II
Church of Our Lady of Mount Carmel; 53.91437°N 1.93660°W		1869–70	A Methodist church, later Roman Catholic, it is stone with a roof of Welsh and Westmorland green slate. The church has a cruciform plan, consisting of a nave, north and south transepts, and a chancel. At the southwest corner is an octagonal turret with a spirelet. The west end is gabled, and contains a doorway with a triangular hood containing a quatrefoil, and a five-light window with Decorated tracery. In each transept are five stepped lancet windows.	II
Waterloo Mill and Engine House; 53.91146°N 1.93563°W		c. 1870	A textile mill, to which the engine house was added in 1916, has later been used for other purposes. It is in gritstone with roofs of grey slate and glazing, and has gates of cast and wrought iron. At the entrance are gates and gate piers, an office range and an octagonal tapering chimney with a chamfered base. In the mill yard is a three-storey engine house and a four-storey spinning mill with fronts of 18 and five bays. To the north is a single-storey seven-bay weaving shed and a taller single-storey ten-bay office and finishing shop. At the western end are a single-storey nine-bay weaving shed, a two-storey warehouse range with fronts of 16 and five bays, and another warehouse range with two storeys and fronts of ten and two bays.	II*
Gates and gate piers, St James' Church; 53.91413°N 1.93801°W	—	c. 1896	The gate piers flanking the entrance to the churchyard are in stone with a square plan. Each pier has a chamfered plinth, a traceried panel with a triangular hood, and a moulded cap. The gates are richly decorated in Art Nouveau style, with a butterfly motif.	II
