= City of Bradford =

City and metropolitan borough in West Yorkshire, England

- City and metropolitan borough
- Bradford
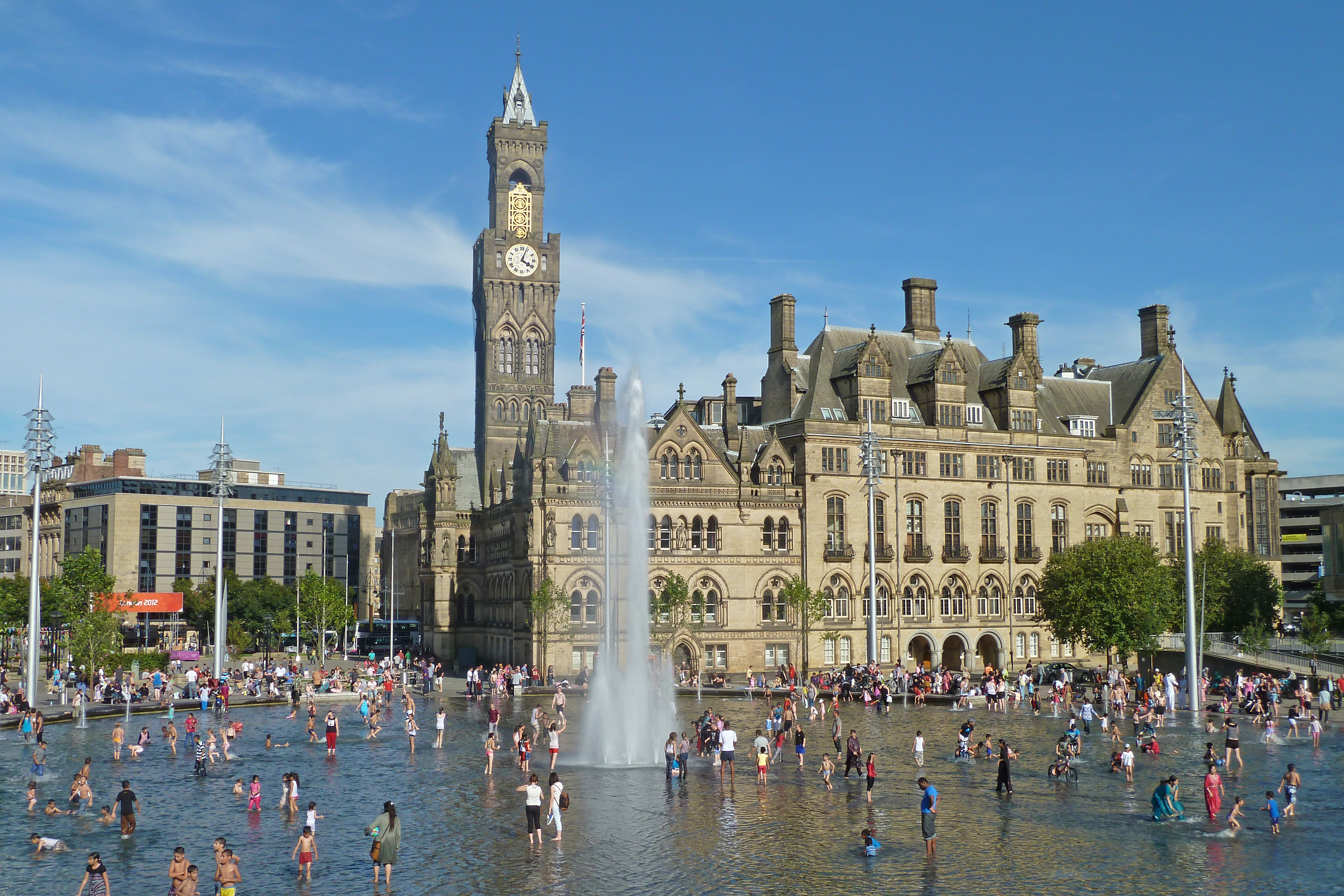
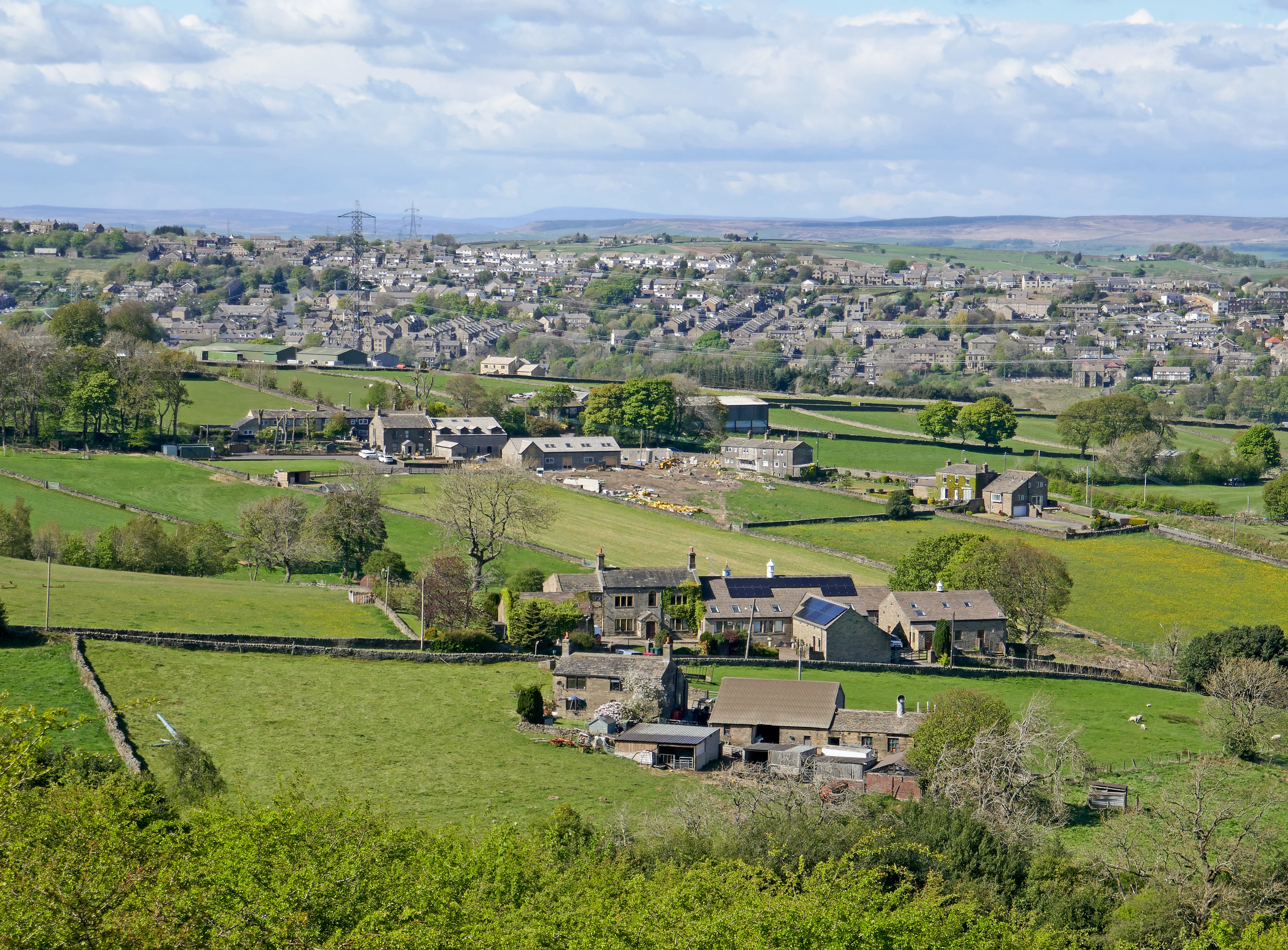
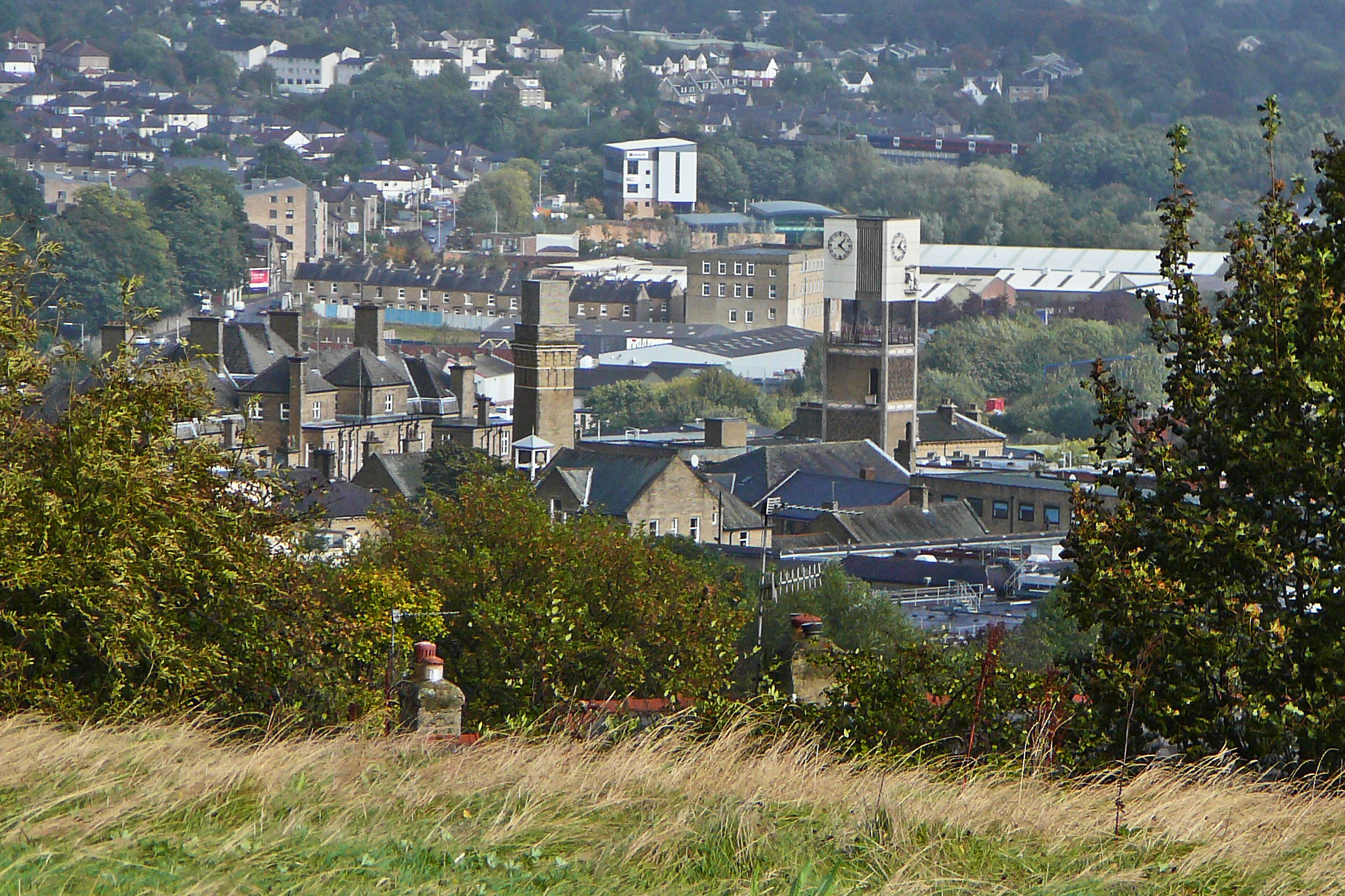
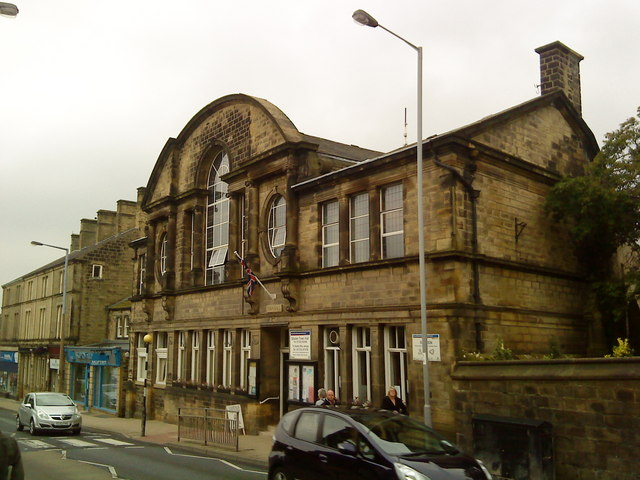
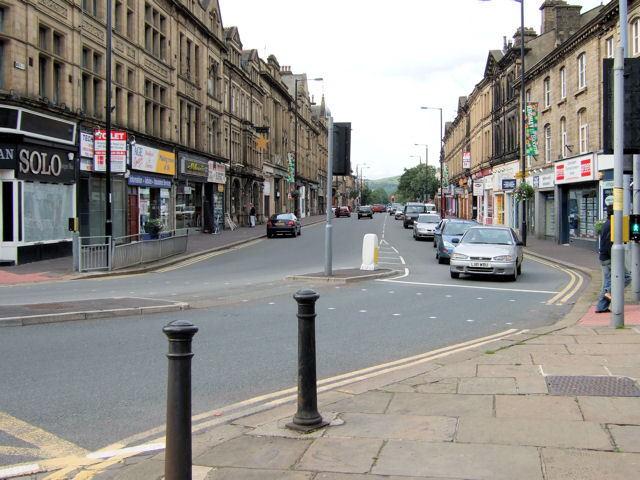
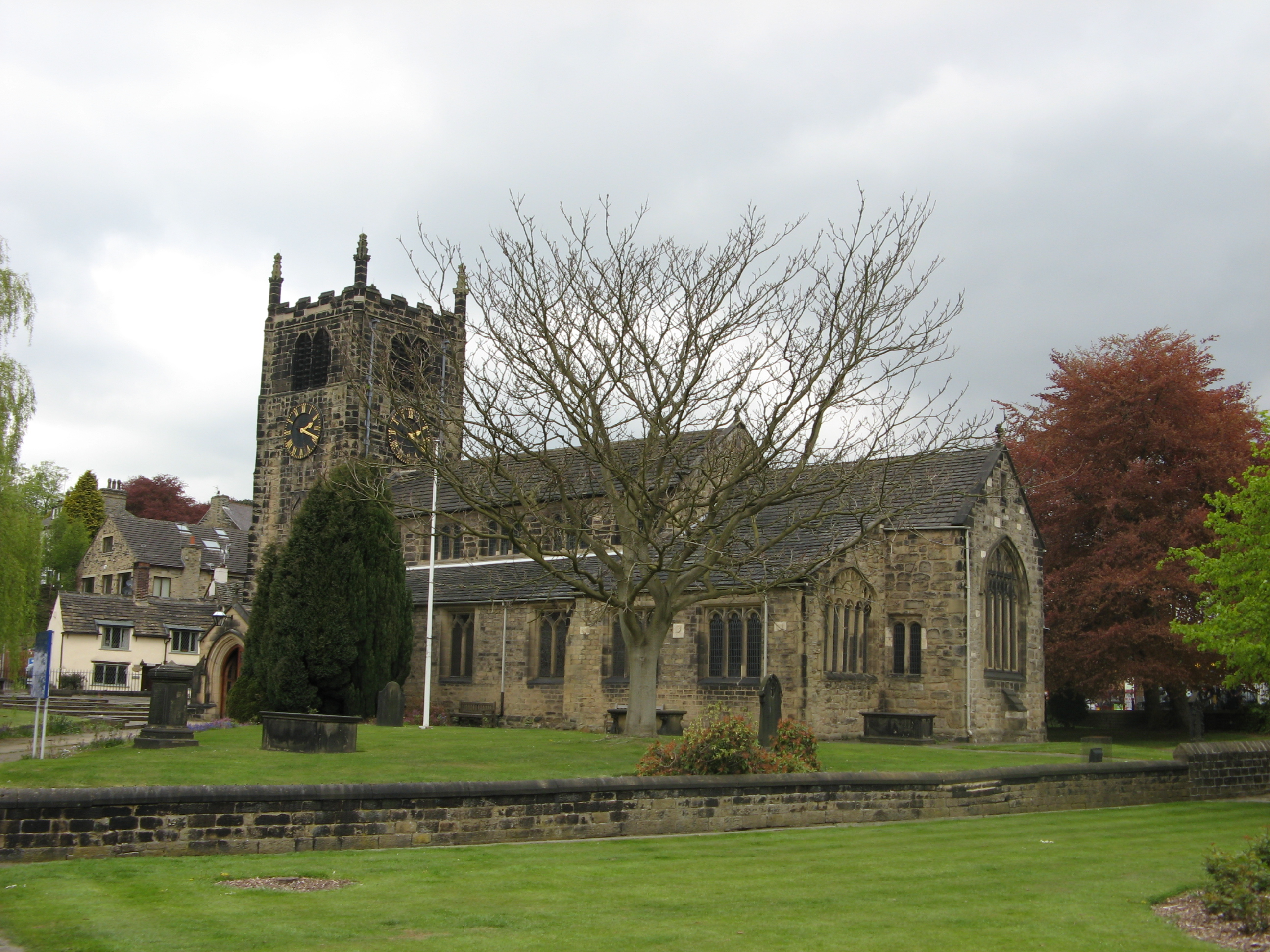
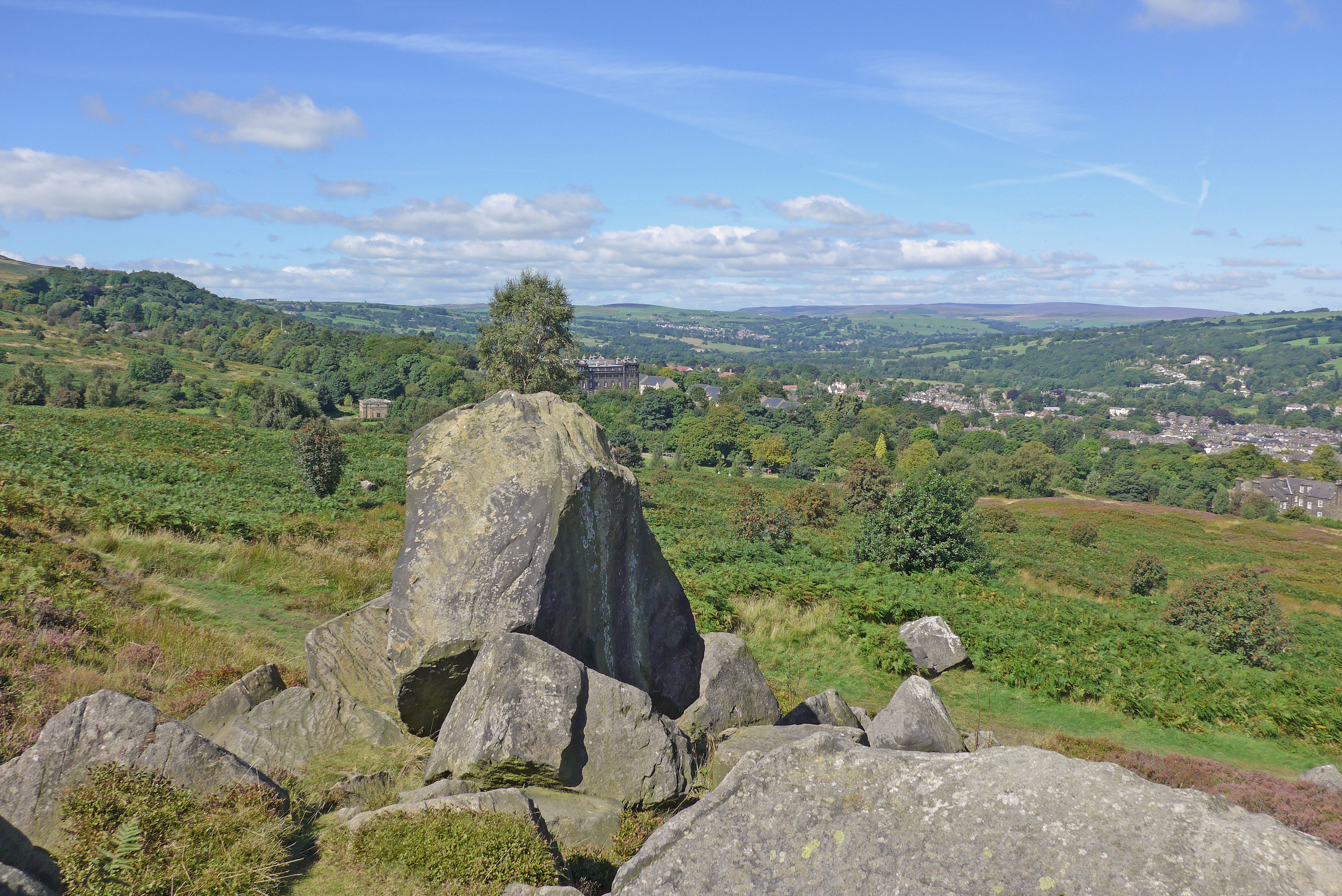
- From left to right; Top: Bradford City Hall and fountains; Upper: Queensbury and Shipley skyline; Lower: Silsden town hall and Keighley town centre; Bottom: Bingley All Saints Church and Ilkley Moor

- Coat of arms
- Nickname: 'Wool City'
- Motto: 'Progress-Industry-Humanity'
- Interactive map of City of Bradford
- Coordinates: 53.792°N 1.754°W
- Sovereign state: United Kingdom
- Country: England
- Region: Yorkshire and the Humber
- Ceremonial county: West Yorkshire
- Historic county: Yorkshire
- Admin HQ: Bradford
- Borough charter: 1847
- City status: 1897
- City of Bradford Met. District created: 1974

Government
  - Type: Metropolitan borough and City
  - Governing body: City of Bradford Metropolitan District Council
  - Council Leader: Stephen Place (Reform UK)
  - Lord Mayor: Andrew Mark Judson (Reform UK)
  - Deputy Lord Mayor: Chris Herd (Reform UK))
  - MPs: Anna Dixon (Lab); Naz Shah (Lab); Robbie Moore (Con); Judith Cummins (Lab); Imran Hussain (Lab)

Area
  - Total: 143 sq mi (370 km^{2})

Population (2025)
  - Total: 557,758 (Ranked 9th)
  - Density: 3,300/sq mi (1,290/km^{2})
  - Ethnicity (2021 census): 61.1% White; 32.1% Asian; 2.0% Black; 2.7% Mixed; 2.0% Other

Ethnicity (2021)
  - Ethnic groups: List: 61.1% White; 32.1% Asian; 2.7% Mixed; 2% Black; 2% other

Religion (2021)
  - Religion: List: 33.4% Christianity; 30.5% Islam; 28.2% no religion; 5.5% not stated; 0.9% Sikhism; 0.9% Hinduism; 0.4% other; 0.2% Buddhism; 0.1% Judaism
- Time zone: UTC+0 (Greenwich Mean Time)
- Postcode: BD, LS
- Area codes: 01274 (urban core/wider city); 01535 (Keighley); 01943 (Ilkley)
- ISO 3166-2: GB-BFD
- ONS code: 00CX (ONS); E08000032 (GSS)
- NUTS 3: UKE41
- OS grid reference: SE164331
- Website: www.bradford.gov.uk
- Click the map for an interactive fullscreen view

Bradford (/ˈbrædfərd/), also known as the City of Bradford, is a metropolitan borough with city status in West Yorkshire, England. It is named after its largest settlement, Bradford, but covers a larger area which includes the towns and villages of Keighley, Shipley, Bingley, Ilkley, Haworth, Silsden, Queensbury, Thornton and Denholme. Bradford has a population of 528,155, making it the fourth-most populous metropolitan district and the ninth-most populous local authority district in England. It forms part of the West Yorkshire Urban Area conurbation which in 2011 had a population of 1,777,934, and the city is part of the Leeds-Bradford Larger Urban Zone (LUZ), which, with a population of 2,393,300, is the fourth largest in the United Kingdom after London, Birmingham and Manchester.

The city is situated on the edge of the Pennines, and is bounded to the east by the City of Leeds, the south by the Metropolitan Borough of Kirklees and the south west by the Metropolitan Borough of Calderdale. The Pendle borough of Lancashire lies to the west whilst the unitary authority of North Yorkshire lie to the north west and north east of the city. Bradford is the fourth largest metropolitan district in the country, and the contiguous urban area to the north which includes the towns of Shipley and Bingley is heavily populated. The spa town of Ilkley lies further north, whilst the town of Keighley lies to the west. Roughly two thirds of the district is rural, with an environment varying from moorlands in the north and west, to valleys and floodplains formed by the river systems that flow throughout the district. More than half of Bradford's land is green open space, stretching over part of the Airedale and Wharfedale Valleys, across the hills and the Pennine moorland between. The Yorkshire Dales and the Peak District are both in close proximity.

The City of Bradford has architecture designated as being of special or historic importance, most of which were constructed with local stone, with 5,800 listed buildings and 59 conservation areas. The model village of Saltaire has been listed as a UNESCO World Heritage Site. Central Bradford rose to prominence during the 19th century as an international centre of textile manufacture, particularly wool. The area's access to a supply of coal, iron ore and soft water facilitated the growth of Bradford's manufacturing base, which, as textile manufacture grew, led to an explosion in population and was a stimulus to civic investment. However, Bradford has faced similar challenges to the rest of the post-industrial area of northern England, including deindustrialisation, housing problems, and economic deprivation. Wool and textiles still play an important part in the city's economy, but today's fastest-growing sectors include information technology, financial services, digital industries, environmental technologies, cultural industries, tourism and retail headquarters and distribution.

Bradford has experienced significant levels of immigration throughout the 19th and 20th centuries. In the 1840s Bradford's population was significantly increased by migrants from Ireland, particularly rural County Mayo and County Sligo, and by 1851 around 18,000 people of Irish origin resided in the town, representing around 10% of the population, the largest proportion in Yorkshire. Around the same time there was also an influx of German Jewish migrants to the town, and by 1910 around 1,500 people of German origin resided in the city. In the 1950s there was large scale immigration from South Asia and to a lesser extent from Poland. Bradford has the second highest proportion in England and Wales outside London, in terms of population (behind Birmingham) and in percentage (behind Slough, Leicester, Luton and Blackburn with Darwen). An estimated 175,664 people of South Asian origin reside in the city, representing around 45.3% of the city's population. An estimated 352,317 of all White ethnic groups reside in the city which includes people of Polish and Irish origin, representing around 45.8% of the city's population.

Bradford was designated UK City of Culture for 2025.

== History ==
Bradford was incorporated as a municipal borough in 1847, covering the parishes of Bradford, Horton and Manningham. It became a county borough with the passing of the Local Government Act 1888. The County Borough of Bradford was granted city status by Letters Patent in 1897.

Bradford was expanded in 1882 to include Allerton, Bolton, Bowling, Heaton, Thornbury and Tyersall. In 1899 it was further expanded by adding North Bierley, Eccleshill, Idle, Thornton, Tong, and Wyke. Clayton was added in 1930.

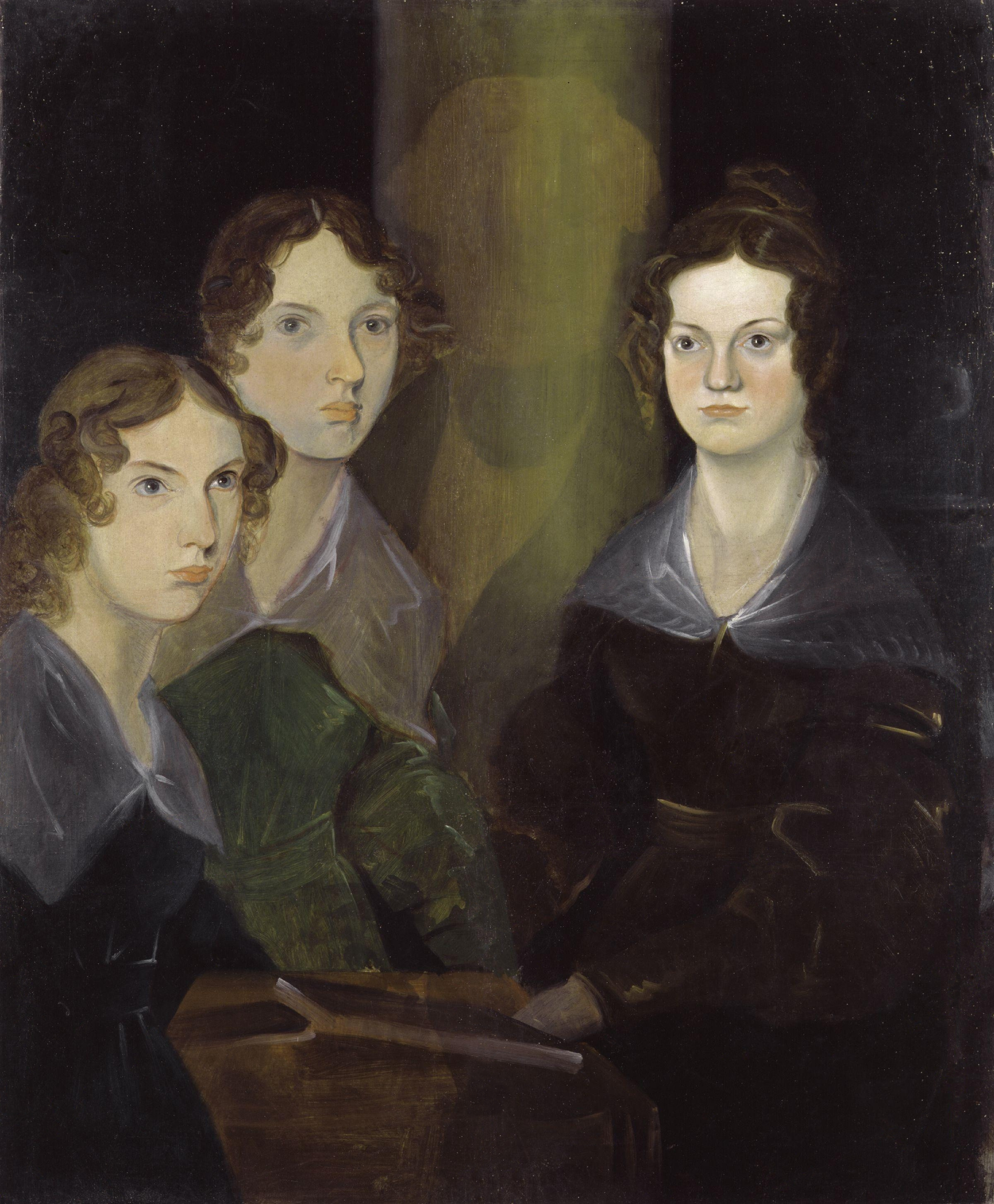
Anne, Emily, and Charlotte Brontë, by their brother Branwell (c. 1834).

The Brontë sisters, Emily, Anne, and Charlotte were born along with their brother Branwell at 74 Market Street in Thornton, now in Bradford, before moving to the parsonage at Haworth in the heart of West Yorkshire's Brontë Country where they wrote a range of classics of English literature including "Wuthering Heights" and "Jane Eyre".

The city played an important part in the early history of the Labour Party. A mural on the back end of Bradford Playhouse in Little Germany commemorates the centenary of the founding of the Independent Labour Party in Bradford in 1893.

The Bradford Pals were three First World War Pals battalions of Kitchener's Army raised in the city. When the three battalions were taken over by the British Army they were officially named the 16th, 18th and 20th Battalions, The Prince of Wales's Own West Yorkshire Regiment.

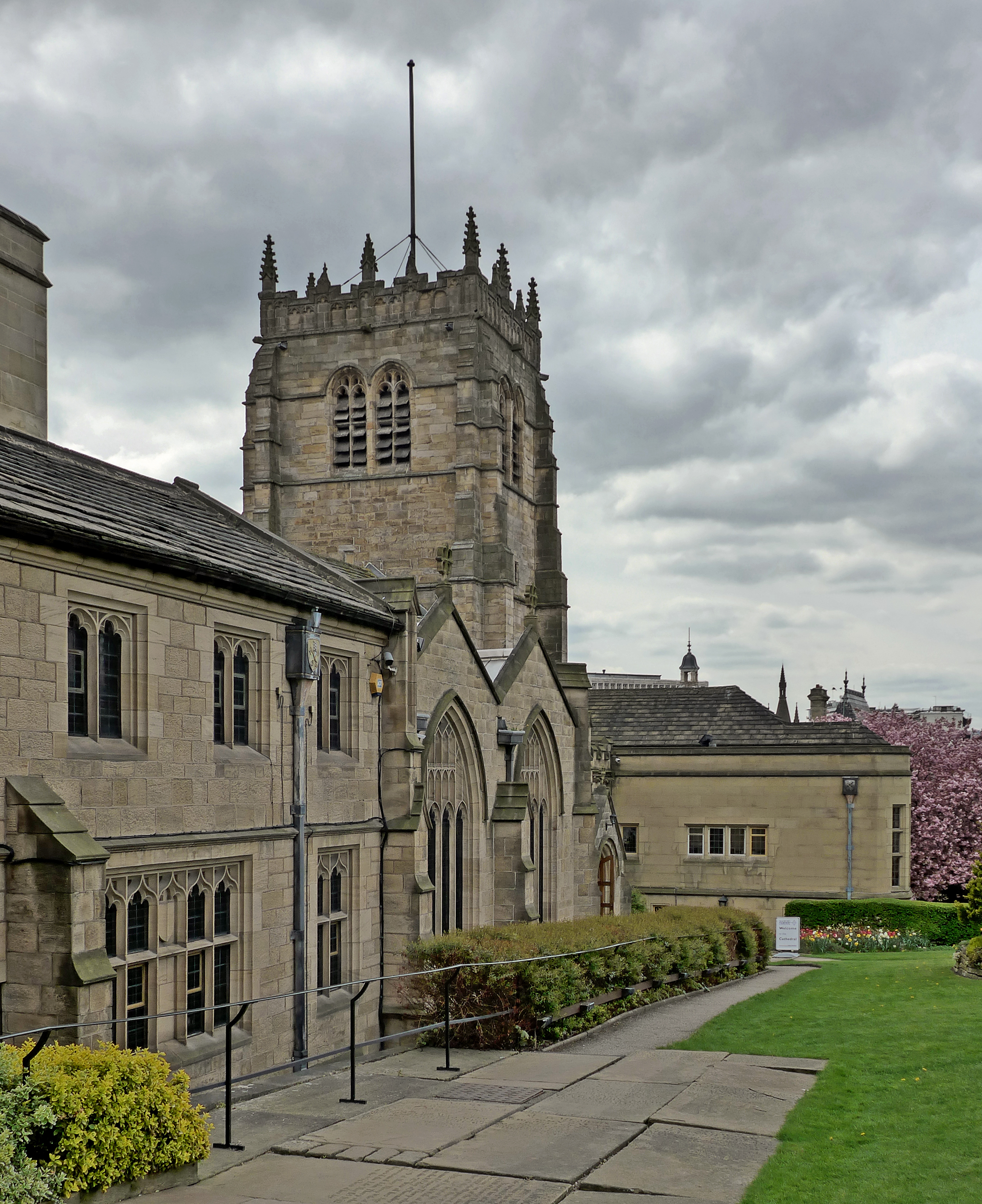
Bradford Cathedral, one of the oldest churches in Bradford and its main cathedral

On the morning of 1 July 1916, an estimated 1,394 young men from Bradford and District The Bradford Pals, the 16th and 18th Battalions of the Prince of Wales Own West Yorkshire Regiment left their trenches in Northern France to advance across No Man's Land. It was the first hour of the first day of the Battle of the Somme. Of the estimated 1,394 men who left the trenches 1,094 were either killed or injured during the ill-fated attack on the village of Serre.

Other Bradford Battalions involved in the Battle of the Somme were 1st/6th Territorial Battalion of The Prince of Wales's Own West Yorkshire Regiment, based at Belle Vue barracks in Manningham and the 10th Battalion of The Prince of Wales's Own West Yorkshire Regiment. The 1st/6th Territorial Battalion of The Prince of Wales's Own West Yorkshire Regiment first saw action in 1915 at Neuve Chapelle before moving north to Yser Canal near Ypres. The 10th Battalion The Prince of Wales's Own West Yorkshire Regiment was involved in the attack on Fricourt, the 10th West Yorks suffered the highest casualty rate of any battalion on the Somme on 1 July and perhaps the highest battalion casualty list for a single day during the entire war. Nearly 60% of the battalion's casualties were deaths.

In 1919 the Diocese of Bradford was founded, the Church of Saint Peter was then elevated to cathedral status.

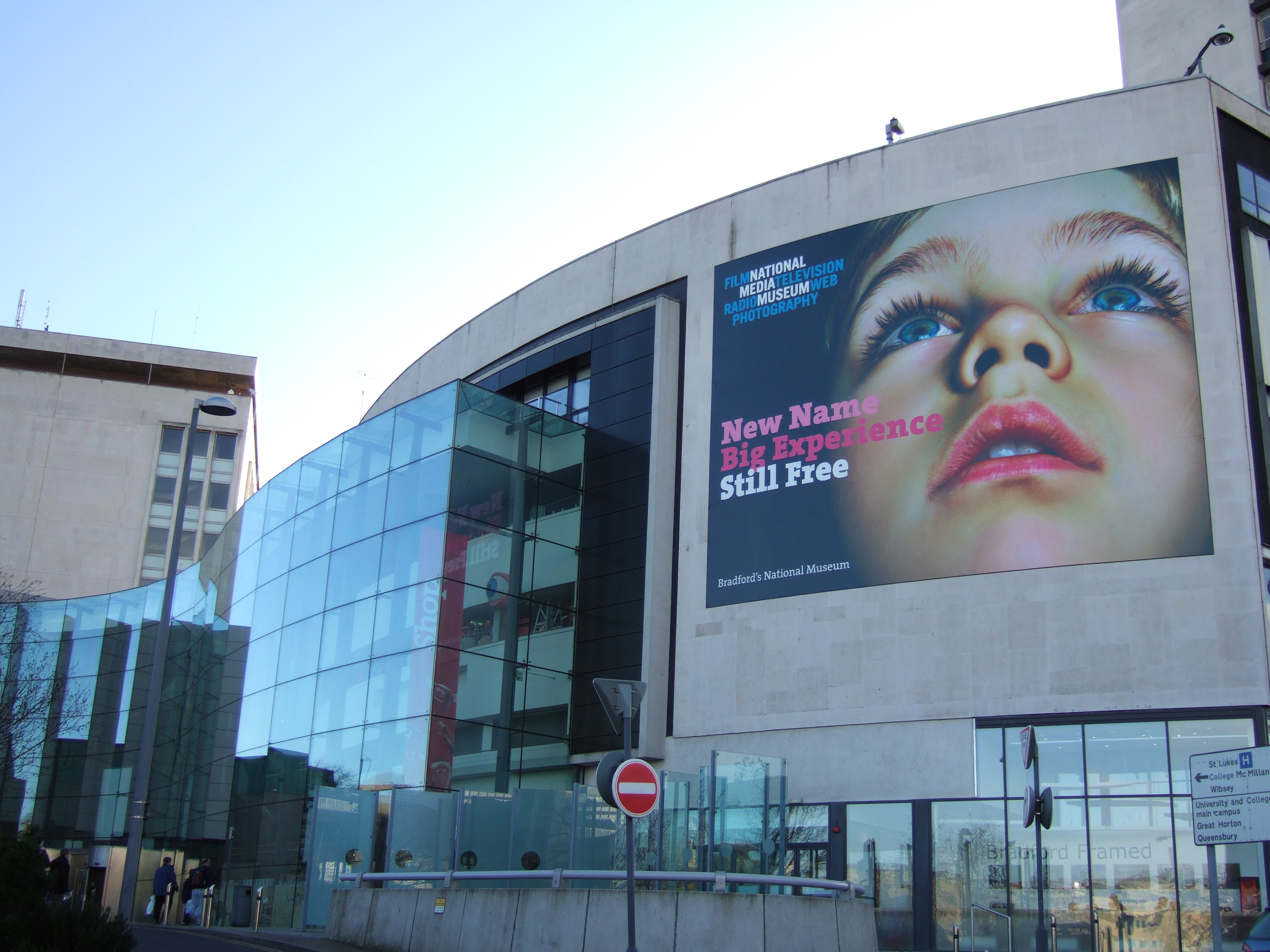
The National Science and Media Museum

The current city boundaries date from 1 April 1974, when the County Borough of Bradford was merged with the borough of Keighley, the urban districts of Baildon, Bingley, Denholme, Ilkley, Shipley and Silsden, along with the Queensbury parts of Queensbury and Shelf Urban District and the parishes of Addingham, and Steeton with Eastburn from Skipton Rural District. Kildwick was part of Bradford at this time, but has since been moved into the Craven District (part of North Yorkshire).

The National Science and Media Museum (formerly the National Museum of Photography, Film and Television) was established in the city in 1983. One of the first cinema shows outside London took place on the site where the museum now stands, in a music hall known as the People's Palace. Today, the National Science and Media Museum hosts the annual Widescreen Weekend film festival.

With a large influx of South Asian immigrants and the Bradford Council's pursuit of a policy of multiculturalism in the 1980s, separatism between ethnic communities became an issue, an issue highlighted by Bradford headteacher Ray Honeyford. In 1989, a section of the Muslim community led a campaign against Salman Rushdie's The Satanic Verses, and caught the attention of the international media by publicly burning a copy of the book. In July 2001, ethnic tensions led to rioting. The Ouseley Report, written shortly before the riots broke out, noted that Bradford had become deeply divided by segregated schooling, with communities deeply ignorant of each other, and there was widespread fear of crime and violence which West Yorkshire Police had insufficiently tackled for fear of being branded racist.

In one case, a Bradford man whose car was set on fire following his conversion complained to police, but the officer advised him to "stop being a crusader and move to another place."

In response to the Ouseley Report, approximately £3 million was provided by the Home Office and the Neighbourhood Renewal Fund to regenerate the city. A further £2 billion was invested in regenerating the city centre, building a banqueting hall, new housing, and leisure facilities.

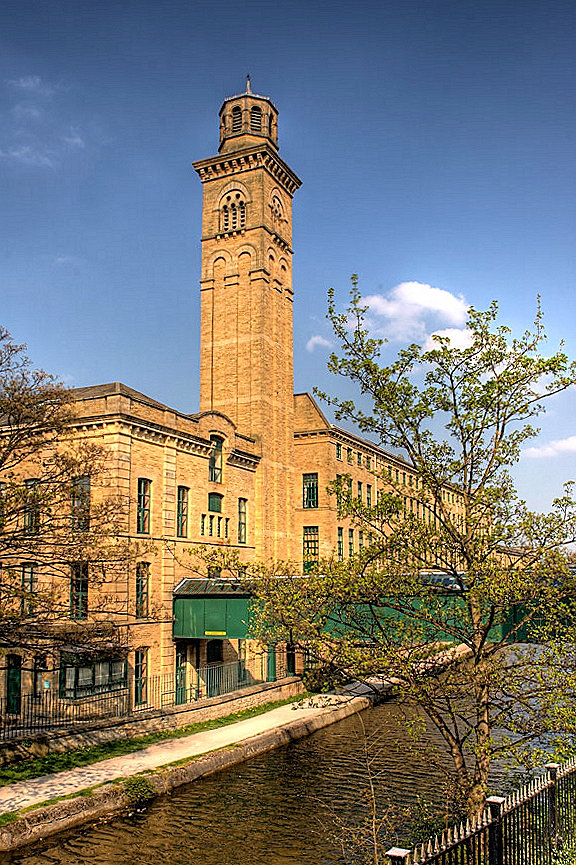
Salts Mill

In December 2001, Saltaire was designated a World Heritage Site by UNESCO. This means that the government has a duty to protect the site. The buildings belonging to the model village are individually listed, with the highest level of protection given to the Congregational church (since 1972 known as the United Reformed Church) which is listed as Grade I. The village which includes Salts Mill (pictured right) has survived remarkably complete with Roberts Park on the north side of the river recently restored by Bradford Council.

In October 2007, Bradford was voted the greenest city in the United Kingdom. In the Sustainable Cities Index, compiled by Forum for the Future, the city was revealed to have the lowest environmental impact of any British city. In spite of its undeniably large role in the Industrial Revolution, Bradford's rivers were not polluted beyond redemption, and the streams surrounding the city are now a haven of wildlife. The City of Bradford has areas of green space, and recycling schemes.

Bradford became the world's first UNESCO City of Film in 2009. The designation recognises Bradford's aim to use this history and the local popularity and accessibility of film as a major tool for regeneration, cultural development and social inclusion.

The cinema connections in the city (which is also the home of the National Science and Media Museum) are both historical and contemporary, with ongoing efforts to preserve, promote, and enrich the city's heritage of film. Bradford has been a film location since the beginning of cinema, with its indigenous film industry being traced back to the years around the First World War. By then the residents of Bradford had already witnessed important contributions to cinema development, such as the invention of the Cieroscope in Manningham in 1896.

In April 2021, Little Germany was one of the areas where scenes for the second series of All Creatures Great and Small were being filmed. Some child and adult actors from the theatre school Articulate were to appear in some episodes.

== Geography ==
The City of Bradford is situated on the edge of the Pennines, and is bounded to the east by the City of Leeds, the south by the Metropolitan Borough of Kirklees, and the southwest by the Metropolitan Borough of Calderdale. The Lancashire Borough of Pendle lies to the west, whilst North Yorkshire districts of Craven and Harrogate lie to the north west and north east respectively. Bradford district has 3636 hectares of upland heathland, including Ilkley Moor where the peat bogs rise to 402 m (1,319 ft) above sea level. Less than 5% of the Bradford district is woodland. Greenspace accounts for 73.8% of the City of Bradford's total area, domestic buildings and gardens comprise 12.1%, and the rest is made up of roads and non-domestic buildings.

Three river systems serve the City of Bradford, along with 23 km of canal. The Airedale towns of Keighley, Bingley and Shipley lie on the River Aire. The River Wharfe runs through Ilkley and Burley in Wharfedale, and tributaries of the River Calder run through the district. Unusually for a major settlement, Bradford is not built on any substantial body of water. The ford from which it takes its name (Broad-Ford) was a crossing of the stream called Bradford Beck.

=== Parishes ===
While most of Bradford is unparished, there are parish and town councils for most of the outlying towns and villages in the District. From 2009, the parishes are:

- Addingham
- Baildon
- Burley
- Clayton
- Cullingworth
- Denholme
- Harden
- Haworth, Cross Roads and Stanbury
- Ilkley
- Keighley
- Menston
- Oxenhope
- Sandy Lane
- Silsden
- Steeton with Eastburn
- Trident
- Wilsden
- Wrose

== Governance ==
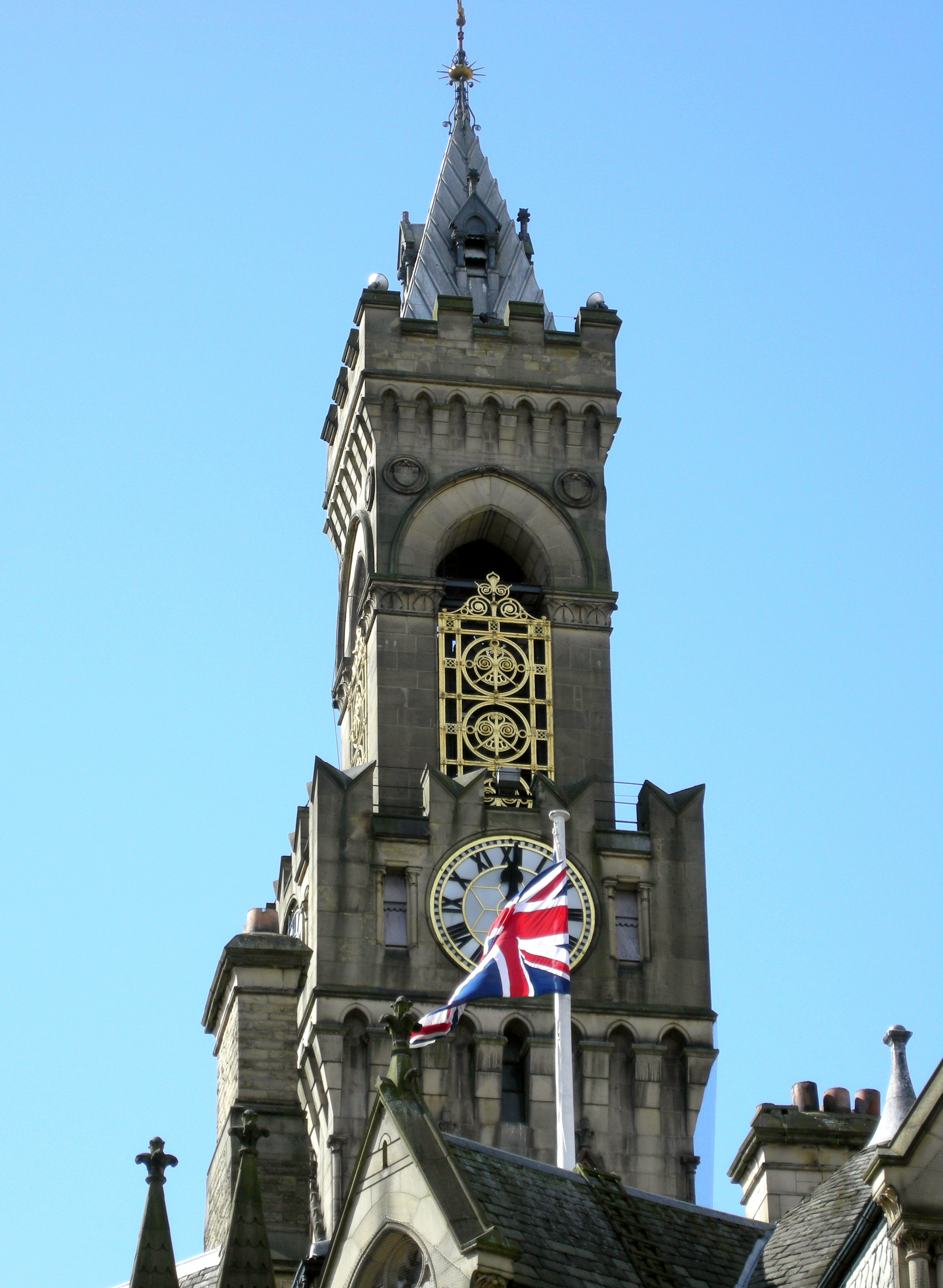
Bradford City Hall Tower and Flagpole

=== Parliamentary constituencies ===
The residents of Bradford are represented in the British Parliament by Members of Parliament (MPs) for five separate parliamentary constituencies. Bradford East is represented by Imran Hussain (Labour), Bradford West is represented by Naz Shah (Labour), Bradford South is represented by Judith Cummins (Labour), Shipley is represented by Anna Dixon (Labour), and Keighley is represented by Robbie Moore (Conservative).

The city played an important part in the early history of the Labour Party. A mural on the back of the Priestley Centre For The Arts (visible from Leeds Road) commemorates the centenary of the founding of the Independent Labour Party in 1893.

=== Council ===
In 1974, City Of Bradford Metropolitan District Council was created to administer the newly formed metropolitan borough. The County Borough of Bradford was merged with the Borough of Keighley, the Urban Districts of Baildon, Bingley, Denholme, Ilkley, Shipley and Silsden, along with part of Queensbury and Shelf Urban District and part of Skipton Rural District by the Local Government Act 1972. The council, which is based at Bradford City Hall in Centenary Square, governs the whole metropolitan district. The city was granted the right on 18 September 1907 to elect a Lord Mayor.

The city is divided into 30 Electoral Wards, each ward electing three Councillors. Elections are held in May, where one third of the 90 seats (one for each ward) are contested and the successful candidate is elected for a period of four years.

=== Electoral wards ===
The Metropolitan District is divided into 30 electoral wards.

Ward name	Area (ha)/mi^{2}	Population	Population density (people per hectare)	Ref.
Baildon	1,086 hectares (4.19 sq mi)	12,067	14.33	
Bingley	1,241 hectares (4.79 sq mi)	13,675	11.01	
Bingley Rural	3,164 hectares (12.22 sq mi)	15,142	4.79	
Bolton and Undercliffe	326 hectares (1.26 sq mi)	15,445	47.38	
Bowling and Barkerend	190 hectares (0.73 sq mi)	17,917	94.3	
Bradford Moor	238 hectares (0.92 sq mi)	17,497	73.52	
City	464 hectares (1.79 sq mi)	18,485	39.80	
Clayton and Fairweather Green	579 hectares (2.24 sq mi)	15,191	26.24	
Craven	5,008 hectares (19.34 sq mi)	15,875	3.17	
Eccleshill	285 hectares (1.10 sq mi)	13,278	46.58	
Great Horton	317 hectares (1.22 sq mi)	16,019	50.47	
Heaton	613 hectares (2.37 sq mi)	16,913	27.59	
Idle and Thackley	685 hectares (2.64 sq mi)	14,366	20.97	
Ilkley	1,907 hectares (7.36 sq mi)	13,828	7.25	
Keighley Central	508 hectares (1.96 sq mi)	16,426	32.33	
Keighley East	2,345 hectares (9.05 sq mi)	15,000	6.4	
Keighley West	939 hectares (3.63 sq mi)	16,281	17.33	
Little Horton	309 hectares (1.19 sq mi)	16,431	53.17	
Manningham	358 hectares (1.38 sq mi)	17,522	48.94	
Queensbury	948 hectares (3.66 sq mi)	17,573	18.54	
Royds	347 hectares (1.34 sq mi)	15,266	43.99	
Shipley	596 hectares (2.30 sq mi)	13,822	23.19	
Thornton and Allerton	1,376 hectares (5.31 sq mi)	15,108	10.98	
Toller	270 hectares (1.0 sq mi)	18,951	70.24	
Tong	1,348 hectares (5.20 sq mi)	13,823	10.25	
Wharfedale	1,573 hectares (6.07 sq mi)	11,126	7.07	
Wibsey	278 hectares (1.07 sq mi)	13,447	48.35	
Windhill and Wrose	448 hectares (1.73 sq mi)	15,244	34.03	
Worth Valley	5,989 hectares (23.12 sq mi)	15,546	2.6	
Wyke	867 hectares (3.35 sq mi)	15,897	18.33	

=== Possible split of district ===
Between 2020 and 2022 there was a campaign led by Philip Davies and Robbie Moore, the Conservative MPs for Shipley and Keighley, for their constituencies to break away from Bradford. They claimed the council's focus was too much on Bradford urban area, to the detriment of the smaller centres of Bingley, Ilkley, Keighley, and Shipley, which they said suffered a lack of investment and service cuts as well as council tax hikes. The move for independence was criticised by Bradford City Council. Moore promoted a private member's bill which would have allowed a referendum to be held on the matter, but it did not proceed beyond its second reading in the House of Commons in 2022.

=== Coat of arms ===
Bradford Coat of Arms

The coat of arms of Bradford City council is based on that of the former City and County Borough Council, with additions to indicate the merger of eleven Yorkshire councils. The boar's head, as in the former city council's crest, refers to the legend of the boar of Cliffe Wood. This was a ferocious wild boar that terrorised the populace and caused much damage to land and property; so much so that the Lord of the manor offered a reward for anyone brave enough to slay the boar and bring its head to the Manor House. The mural crown is a frequent symbol of local government, but here also suggests a wellhead. The stag is derived from the device of the Denholme Urban District Council and the arms of the former Borough of Keighley, but represents the District as a whole. The white angora goat is retained from the former arms, recalling that the wool of this animal was used in the local industries. The roses on the collars refer to the Yorkshire rose and the compartment resembles the area's hills and dales.

The original Bradford Coat of Arms had the Latin words 'LABOR OMNIA VINCIT' below it, meaning Work conquers all.

== Demography ==
In the 2021 census, the population of Bradford stood at 333,931, up from 314,58 in 2011, the 2024 population estimate for the city is 347,767. The city has a population density of 5,453/km².

The city of Bradford is 45.8% White according to the latest 2021 census data, with the White British population being 40.5%. 45.3% of the city's population is Asian, primarily from the Pakistani community. 3.2% of the city's population is mixed race, 2.9% is Black, 0.7% is Arab and 2% stated as other.

45.9% of the people living in Bradford are Muslim, 28.1% are Christian, 22.9% are Non Religious, 1.3% are Hindus, 1.3% are Sikhs, 0.2% are Buddhists and 0.3% identify as other.

The area of Bradford with the highest Ethnic White population is Idle, where 91.2% of the population are White, with 50.7% identifying as Christian, 43.8% as Non Religious, and just 2.4% as Muslim.

Wyke is second, with 89.7% of people being White, 47.6% being Christian, 45.5% being Non Religious and 5.2% being Muslim.

Holmewood is 78.5% White, 43.7% Non Religious, 43.6% Christian and 9.4% Muslim.

Eccleshill is 75.5% White, 42% Non Religious, 38.2% Christian and 17.7% Muslim.

Buttershaw is 62.7% White, 38.4% Christian, 30% Muslim and 29.4% Non Religious.

Clayton is 53.2% White, 36.1% Muslim, 33.7% Christian and 24.7% Non Religious.

Undercliffe is 53% White, 36.5% Muslim, 31.2% Christian, and 26.4% Non Religious.

Bowling is 35% White, 56.5% Muslim, 22.7% Christian and 17.4% Non Religious.

Great Horton is 29.8% White, 61.3% Muslim, 21.9% Christian and 12.2% Non Religious.

Little Horton is 22.4% White, 69.1% Muslim, 19.6% Christian and 9.1% Non Religious.

Heaton is 21.7% White, 73.8% Muslim, 15.4% Christian and 9% Non Religious.

Bradford City Centre is 21.6% White, 60.2% Muslim, 19.3% Christian and 11.5% Non Religious.

Bradford Moor is 12.6% White, 82.4% Muslim, 9.1% Christian and 5.6% Non Religious.

Finally, Toller Lane is the least White area of Bradford, with 10.6% of the population being White, 84.5% being Muslim, 9.4% being Christian and 4.4% being Non Religious.

Population density in the Bradford Metropolitan District Council Area from the 2011 census

At the 2011 UK census, the City of Bradford had a population of 522,452. Of the 180,246 households in Bradford, 36.5% were married couples living together, 28% were one-person households, 10.8% were lone parents and 8.4% were co-habiting couples, following a similar trend to the rest of England. The population density was 1,290 inhabitants per square kilometre (3,300 inhabitants/mi^{2}) and for every 100 females, there were 92.8 males. Of those aged 16–74, 24.5% had no academic qualifications, lower than the 28.9% in all of England. 11.8% of Bradford residents were born outside the United Kingdom, higher than the England average of 9.2%.

The ONS Regional Trends report, published in June 2009, showed that most of the urban core and 41% of the district as a whole were among the most deprived in the country, it also showed that 11% of the district as a whole were among the least deprived in the country. Bradford has one of the highest unemployment rates in England, with the economic inactivity rates of Black, Asian and Minority Ethnic groups standing at over 50% of the working age population.

The crime rate in the City of Bradford is significantly higher than the national average, at around 116 crimes per 1,000 residents per year, but lower than that of Manchester (around 146 per 1,000). Violence and sexual offences are the most common crime type in the district, at 59.38 per 1,000 residents compared with 35 per 1,000 nationally.

== Tourism ==
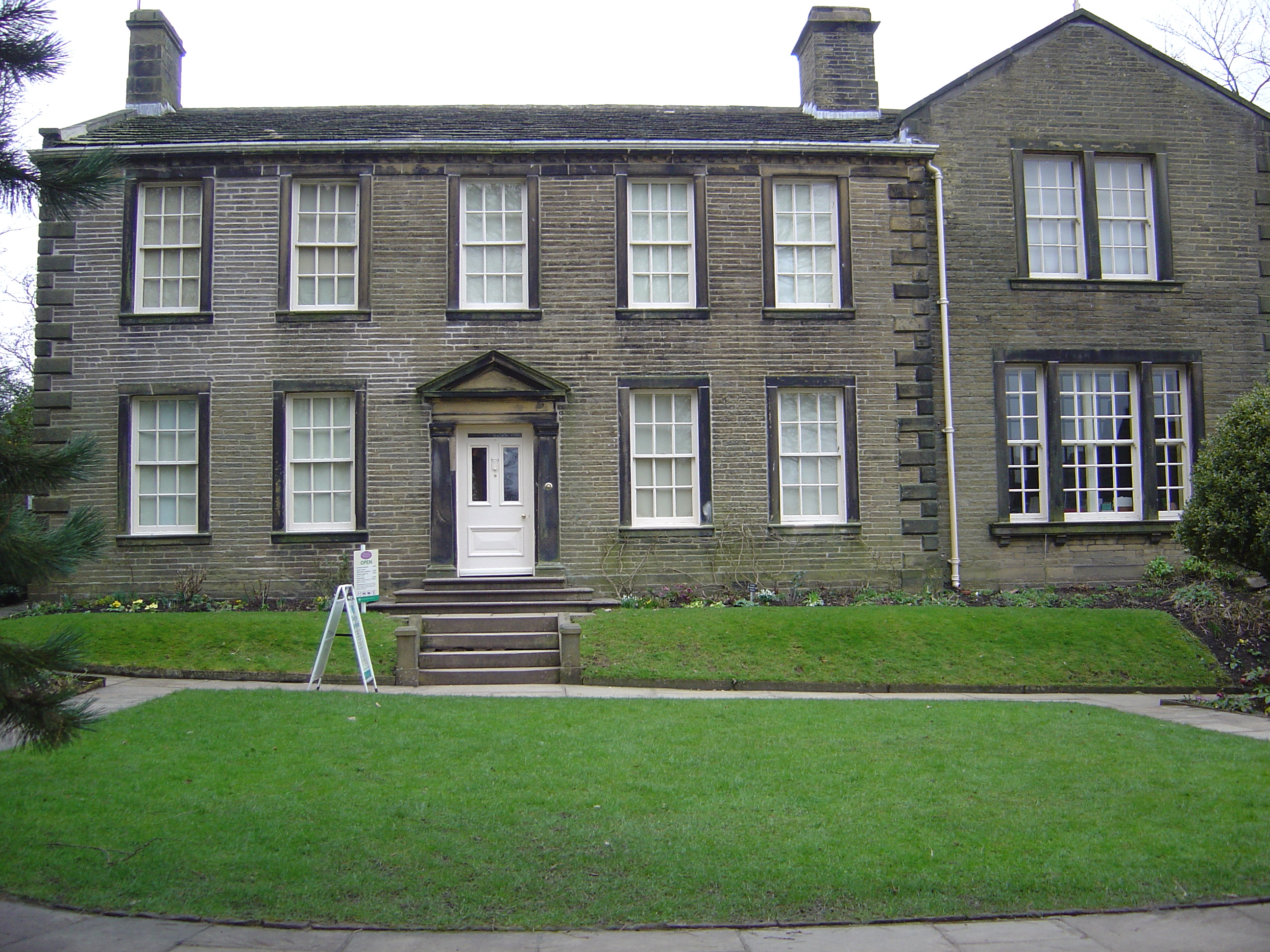
Brontë Parsonage Museum, Haworth

Brontë Country is an area including Western parts of the city as well as the area to the west. The City of Bradford includes the town of Haworth and the village of Thornton, the birthplace of the Brontë sisters.

Keighley and Worth Valley Railway, Ilkley's Cow and Calf Rocks, Bradford's National Science and Media Museum, Bradford City Park, Cartwright Hall, Saltaire village (a UNESCO World Heritage Site) and Salts Mill are key attractions that draw visitors from across the globe.

The City of Bradford has also become the first UNESCO City of Film.

Annual events such as the Bradford Literature Festival, Bradford Film Festival, Bradford Festival, Bradford Mela, Bingley Music Live, Ilkley Literature Festival, Haworth's 1940s weekend, Saltaire Festival and special Christmas events take place across the district.

The value of tourism to the district's economy stands at more than £500 million a year, with an estimated 8.6 million day trips within the district. The impact of this is more than 13,500 jobs supported by the tourism and retail sector.

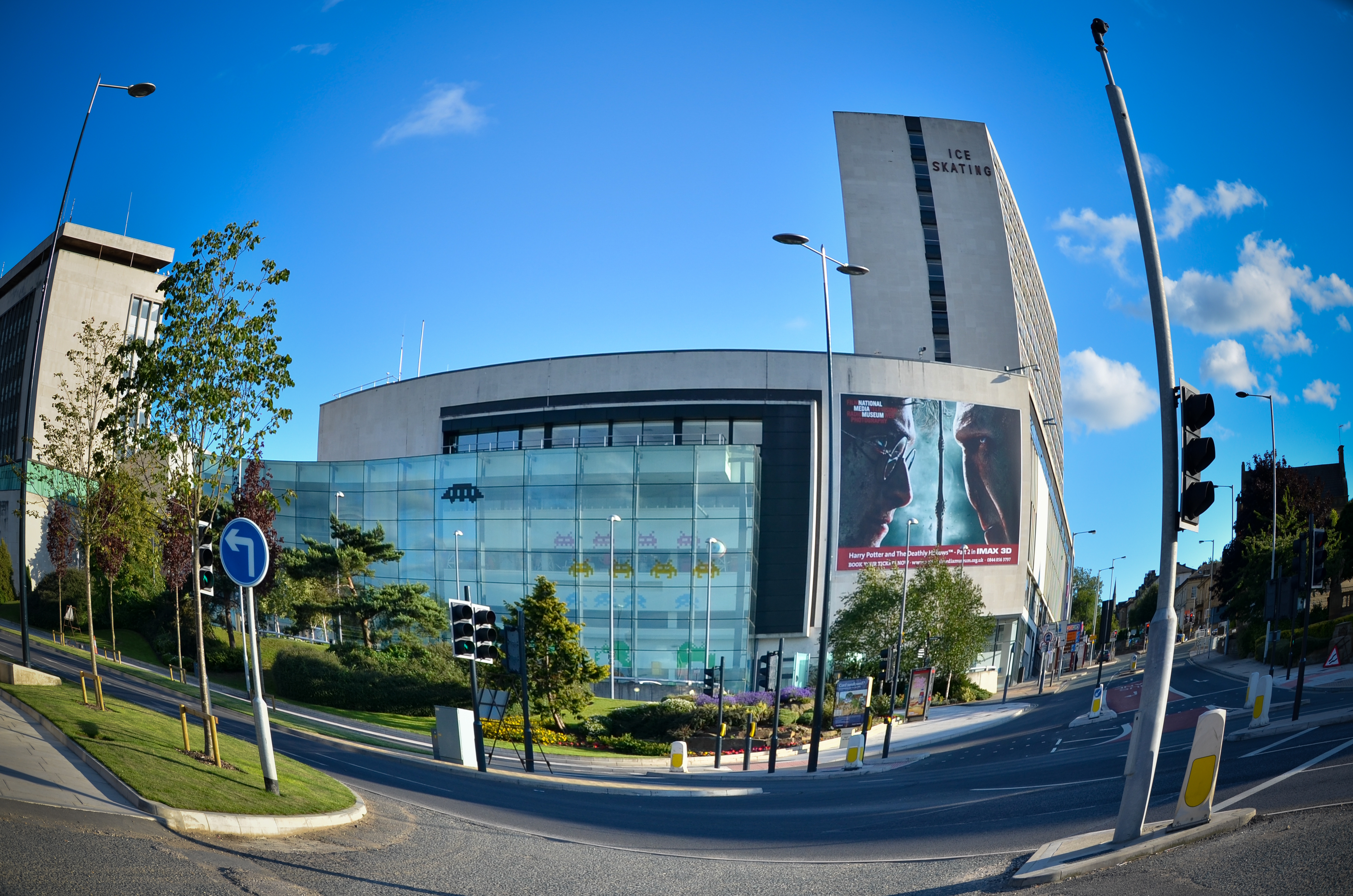
National Science and Media Museum in Bradford, the world's first UNESCO City of Film

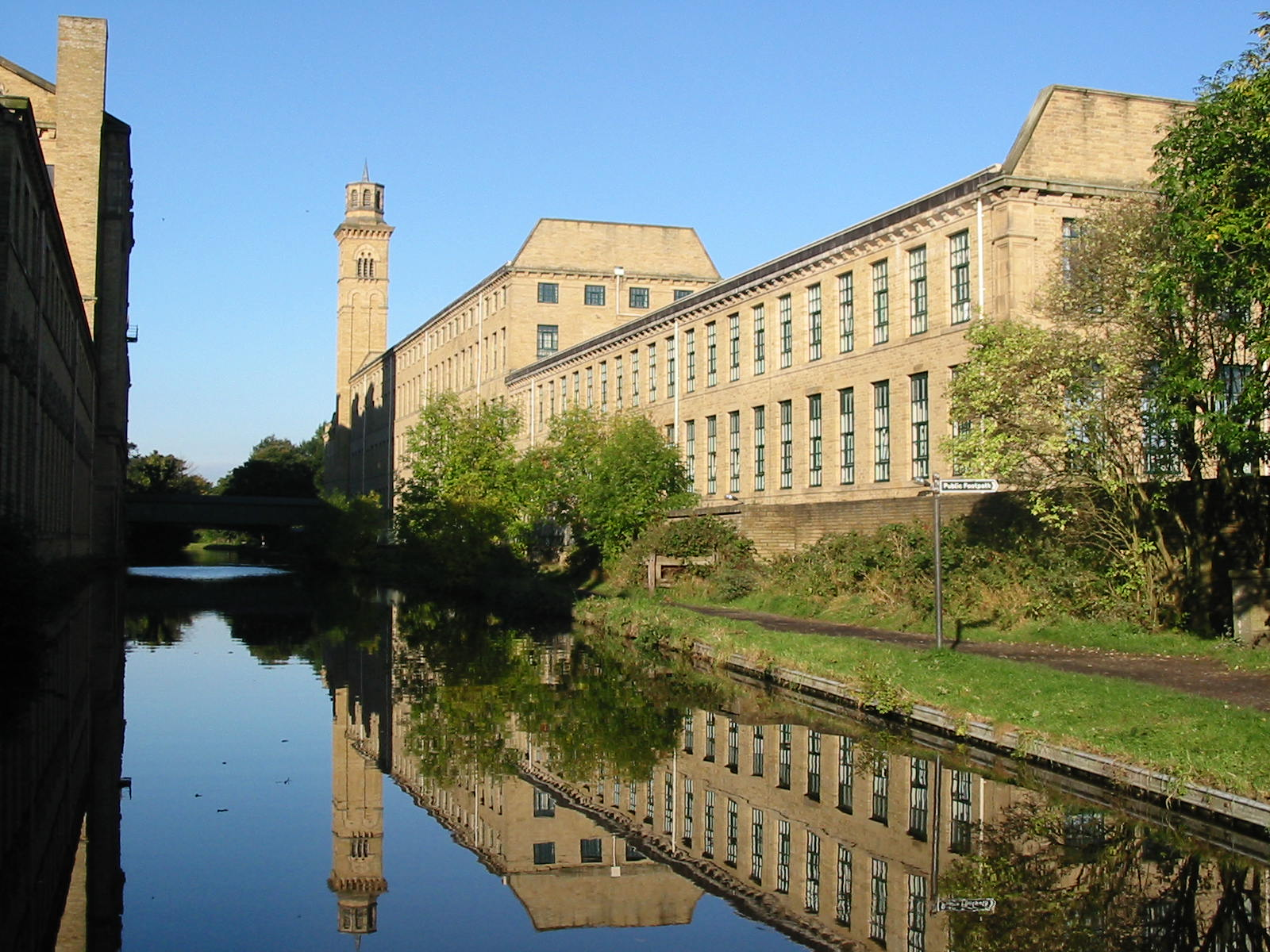
Salts Mill in Saltaire, a UNESCO World Heritage Site

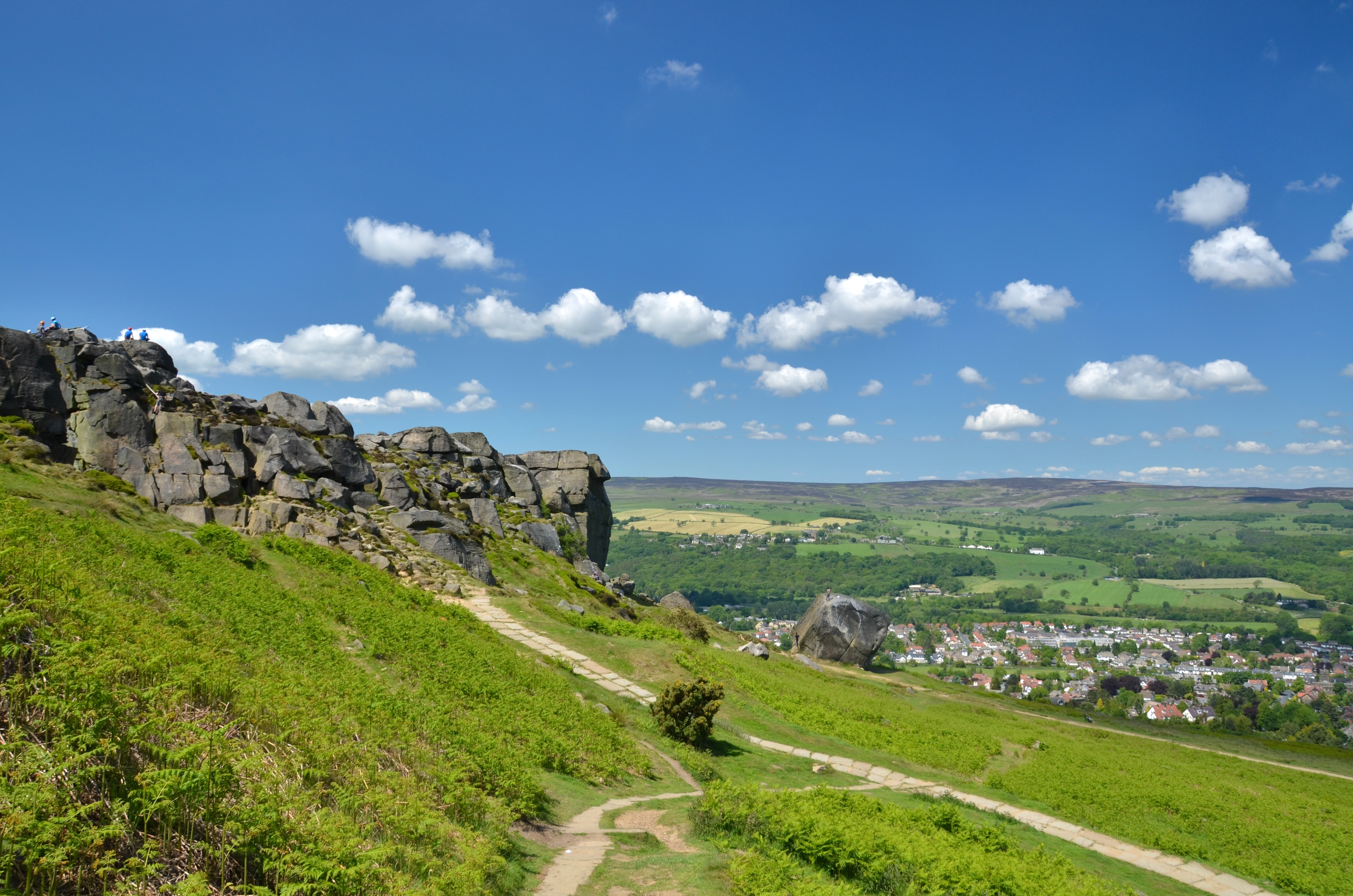
Cow and Calf Rocks in Ilkley

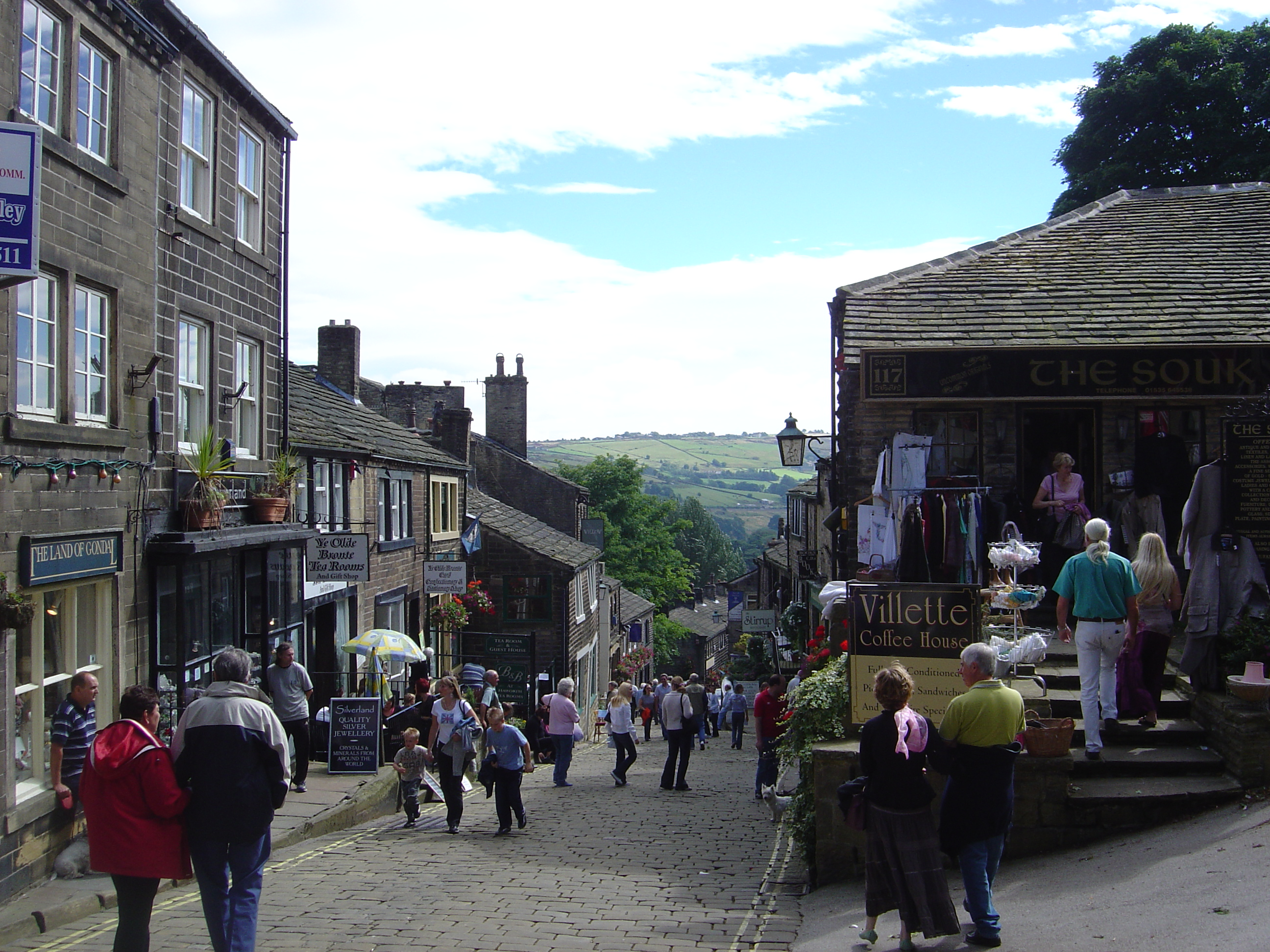
Haworth village centre

== Economy ==
The economy of Bradford is worth around £9.5 billion, contributing around 8.4% of the region's output, and making the district the third largest after Leeds and Sheffield in Yorkshire & Humber. Traditionally based on the wool and textile industries, manufacturing is still strong, accounting for around 1 in 5 jobs. The city's service-sector economy accounts for 77% of the district's 195,000 jobs, with today's fastest-growing sectors including information technology, financial services, tourism and retail headquarters and distribution. The district is home to a number of large businesses with recognised brands operating on a national and international scale such as Morrisons, Pace Plc and Hallmark Cards. Three of the UK's biggest financial institutions are based in Bradford: Yorkshire Building Society, Santander Group and Vanquis Banking Group. It is also home to nationally outstanding cultural businesses, a strong group of new media companies, and a significant national institution in the National Science and Media Museum. Tourism is worth over £400 million to the local economy, and employs over 10,000 people. Bradford's exports are worth almost £700 million.

The city's working-age population has risen by 3.3% since 2000, faster than any UK city outside London, whilst the population of the city itself is growing by twice the national average. Bradford has a younger age profile than the Yorkshire & Humber regional average and the national average, with the younger age groups forming a greater proportion of the population in comparison. Bradford has been named by research group OMIS as one of the top six cities in the UK equipped for future growth, and the CBI reports that business confidence is higher in Bradford than in the UK as a whole, whilst £1.5 billion of construction work is transforming Bradford in a bid to attract further investment.

At the 2001 UK census, Bradford had 326,774 residents aged 16 to 74. 2.5% of these people were students with jobs, 7.6% looking after home or family, 6.1% permanently sick or disabled and 4.5% economically inactive for other reasons. The City of Bradford has a lower economic activity rate than West Yorkshire, the regional average for Yorkshire and the Humber and the national average. Conversely Bradford has a higher economic inactivity rate than all these areas and also has a lower employment rate.

Manufacturing is still strong in Bradford and accounts for almost 12% of all jobs, and the city's service-sector economy accounts for 82% of the district's 192,000 jobs. The entrepreneurial spirit is more present in Bradford than generally in the UK, with start-ups accounting for 12% of the business community.

Bradford's GVA is over £6 billion.

== Education ==
Education in the city is provided for by a number of schools and colleges. State schooling is managed by Bradford local education authority. There are also a number of independent (private) and free schools, such as Bradford Grammar School, Woodhouse Grove School and Bradford Girls Grammar School. Bradford College and the University of Bradford are the main further and higher education providers.

== Media ==
=== Television ===
In terms of television, the area is served by BBC Yorkshire and ITV Yorkshire both broadcast from nearby Leeds.

=== Radio ===
The radio stations that broadcast to the area are:

BBC Local Radio

- BBC Radio Leeds

Independent Local Radio

- Heart Yorkshire
- Capital Yorkshire
- Hits Radio West Yorkshire
- Greatest Hits Radio West Yorkshire

Community Radio

- Sunrise Radio (for the Asian community)
- BCB 106.6fm
- Drystone Radio (covering Wharfedale)

=== Newspapers ===
Local newspapers for the area:

- Telegraph & Argus
- The Yorkshire Post
- Yorkshire Evening Post

== Transport ==
=== Public transit ===
Public transport in Bradford is co-ordinated by Metro. Most local train services are run by Northern, with longer-distance services to London King's Cross railway station served by Grand Central from Bradford Interchange and London North Eastern Railway from Bradford Forster Square station.

The Wharfedale line connects direct to Ilkley, Ben Rhydding, Burley-in-Wharfedale, Menston, Guiseley, Baildon, Shipley and Frizinghall railway stations with Bradford Forster Square. The Airedale line connects the stations at Morecambe, Lancaster, Settle, Carlisle, Skipton, Steeton & Silsden, Keighley (change for the Brontë Country and the Keighley & Worth Valley Railway), Crossflatts, Bingley, Saltaire (UNESCO World Heritage Site) and Shipley, continuing to either Frizinghall and Bradford Forster Square or to Leeds to the east of the district. Both Bradford Forster Square and the district's major and busiest railway station Bradford Interchange are served by the Leeds–Bradford lines with direct routes to Leeds, Selby, York, Brough and Hull. Bradford Interchange, via the Calder Valley line, also connects direct to stations at Manchester, Halifax, Rochdale, Burnley, Blackburn, Preston, Poulton-le-Fylde, Blackpool, Huddersfield, Wakefield, Doncaster, Chester, Warrington, and London King's Cross.

There are bus stations in Bradford, Ilkley, Keighley and Shipley. The majority of services are provided by First Bradford and Keighley Bus Company.

=== Air and water transport ===
Leeds Bradford Airport itself is located in Yeadon, about 10 miles (16 km) to the north-east of the city centre, and has both charter and scheduled flights to destinations within Europe plus the United States, Egypt, Pakistan, and Turkey. There are connections to the rest of the world via London Heathrow, Paris-Charles de Gaulle Airport and Amsterdam Airport Schiphol.

There are also navigable waterways that run through the district. The Leeds and Liverpool Canal passes through numerous towns and villages in the borough, with the Grade I listed Five Rise Locks at Bingley generally considered to be one of the finest feats of canal engineering in the country. There are also proposals to restore and re-open the Bradford Canal, which closed in 1922, as part of a wider regeneration of the city.

=== Roadways ===
The M606, a spur of the M62 motorway, connects the district with the national motorway network. The M606 was originally laid out to reach the centre of Bradford and beyond, but connects instead to the A6177 Bradford outer ring road, making the motorway one of the shortest in the country at less than three miles (4.8 km) long. Another motorway was planned in the 1970s, envisaging a link between Bradford, the Aire valley in the north of the district, and the M65 at Colne, roughly mirroring the existing A650 road. It has since been upgraded to be a dual carriageway along much of its length, bypassing the towns of Bingley and Keighley. The A658 road passes through a tunnel underneath the main Leeds Bradford Airport runway as it heads north-east from Bradford to Knaresborough.

==== Clean air zone ====
Bradford Clean Air Zone is a road traffic low-emission programme in the City of Bradford in West Yorkshire, England. Plans were advanced for many cities in England to have Clean Air Zones (CAZ), but of the ones put forward in West Yorkshire, only Bradford's CAZ has been taken to an operational stage. The scheme commenced on 26 September 2022, and all vehicles, barring private cars and motorbikes, must be compliant with the scheme or face a charge for entering into the zone. The programme aims to help the district comply with legal limits for air quality.

== Twin towns ==
The City of Bradford, and the various towns and villages that make up the Metropolitan District, have Twin Town and Sister City Friendship Agreements with several other communities. Each was originally twinned with a place within the City of Bradford.

Country	Place	Originally twinned with	Date
Belgium	Verviers	Bradford	1970
France	Coutances	Ilkley	1969
France	Eppeville	Wilsden	1982
France	Poix-du-Nord	Keighley	1919
France	Roubaix	Bradford	1969
Germany	Hamm	Shipley	1976
Germany	Mönchengladbach	Bradford	1971
Ireland	Galway	Bradford	1987
Macedonia	Skopje	Bradford	1963
Pakistan	Mirpur	Bradford	1998
Peru	Machu Picchu	Haworth	2005
United States	Haworth	Haworth	2004
United States	Myrtle Beach	Keighley	1993

== See also ==
- Bradford District Museums & Galleries
- List of people from Bradford
- Grade I listed buildings in City of Bradford
- List of Pals battalions
- Listed buildings in Bradford
- Timeline of Bradford history
