= Silsden =

Town and civil parish in West Yorkshire, England

Coordinates: 53.914°N 1.937°W

- Town
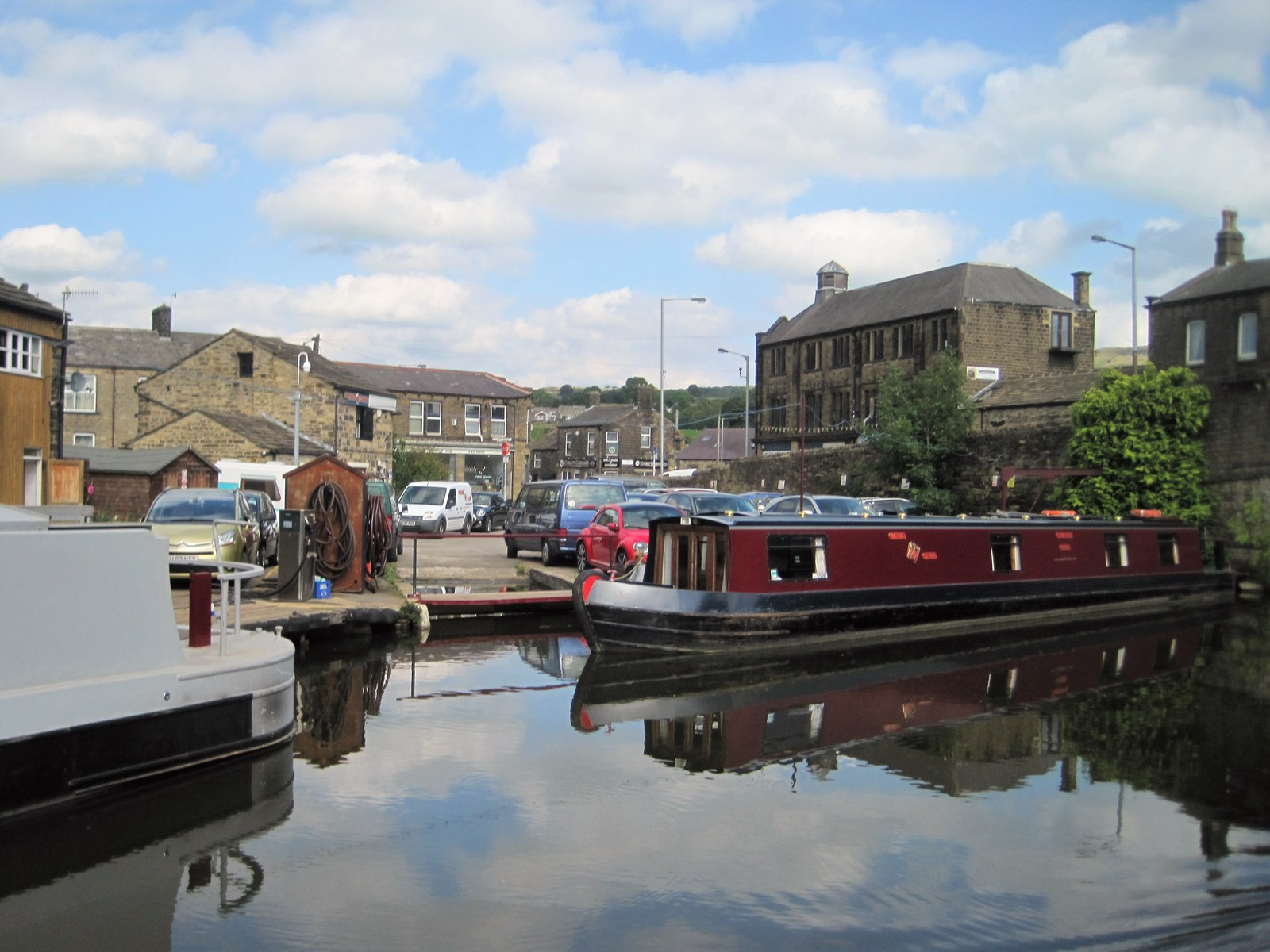
- The town from Leeds & Liverpool Canal

- Location within West Yorkshire
- Population: 8,390 (2021 United Kingdom census)
- OS grid reference: SE042465
  - London: 180 mi (290 km) SE
- Civil parish: Silsden
- Metropolitan borough: City of Bradford
- Metropolitan county: West Yorkshire
- Region: Yorkshire and the Humber
- Country: England
- Sovereign state: United Kingdom
- Post town: KEIGHLEY
- Postcode district: BD20
- Dialling code: 01535/01274
- Police: West Yorkshire
- Fire: West Yorkshire
- Ambulance: Yorkshire
- UK Parliament: Keighley and Ilkley

Silsden is a town and civil parish in the City of Bradford in West Yorkshire, England, on the River Aire and Leeds and Liverpool Canal between Keighley and Skipton, which had a population of 8,390 at the 2021 Census. The parish includes the hamlet of Brunthwaite.

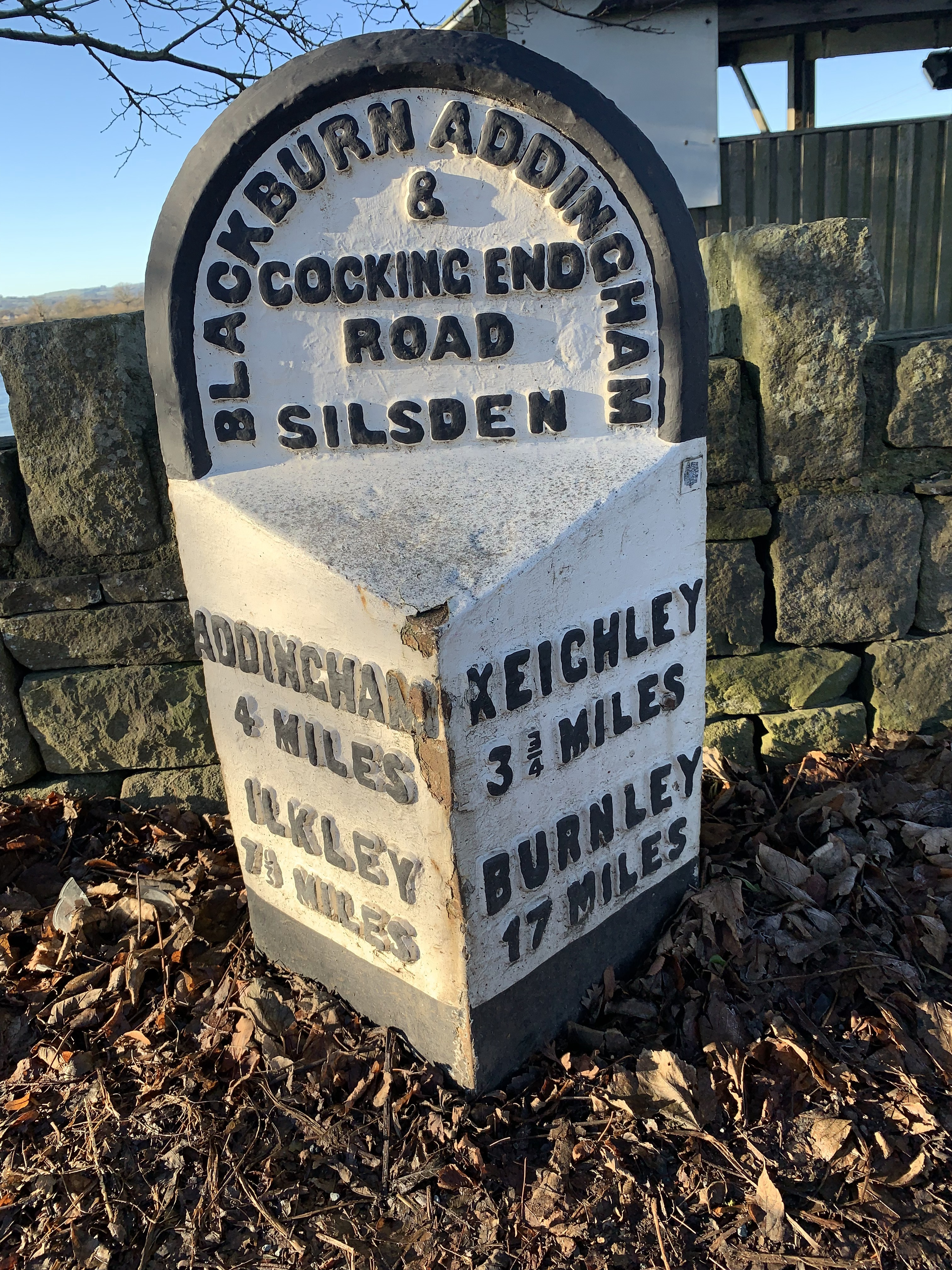
Milestone on A6034 marking boundary of Silsden at River Aire

A milestone on the A6034 "Keighley Road" as it crosses the River Aire marks the boundary of the town.

== History ==
The name Silsden derives from the Old Norse personal name Sigulfr and the Old English denu meaning 'valley'.

Silsden was mentioned in the 1086 Domesday Book as "Siglesdene", and as the most important village in Craven.

Generally an agricultural area, the Industrial Revolution had a significant impact on West Yorkshire, including Silsden. The town hosted a number of mills none of which now operate in their original form.

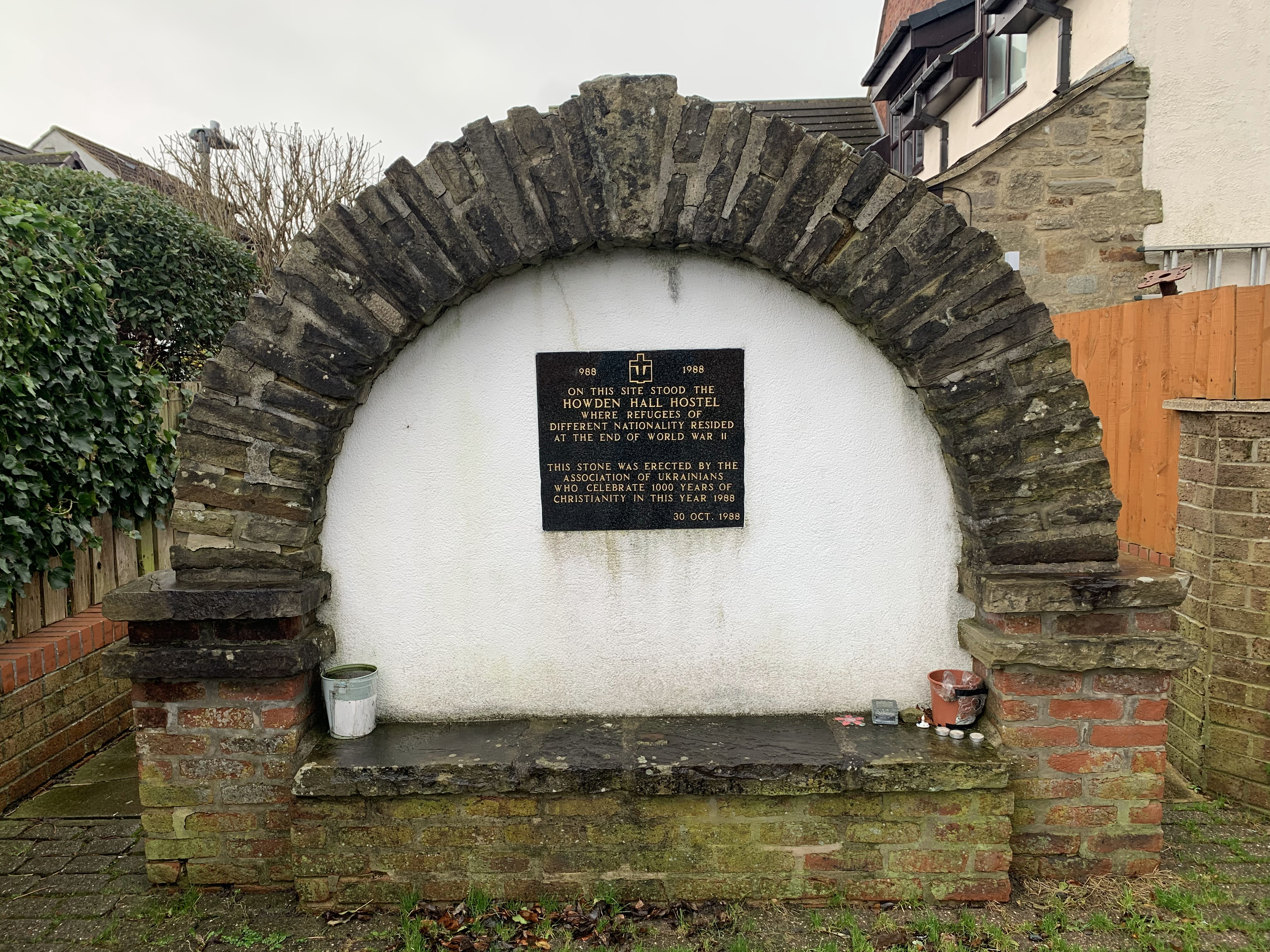
Memorial for Howden Hall Hostel, erected in 1988 by Association of Ukrainians

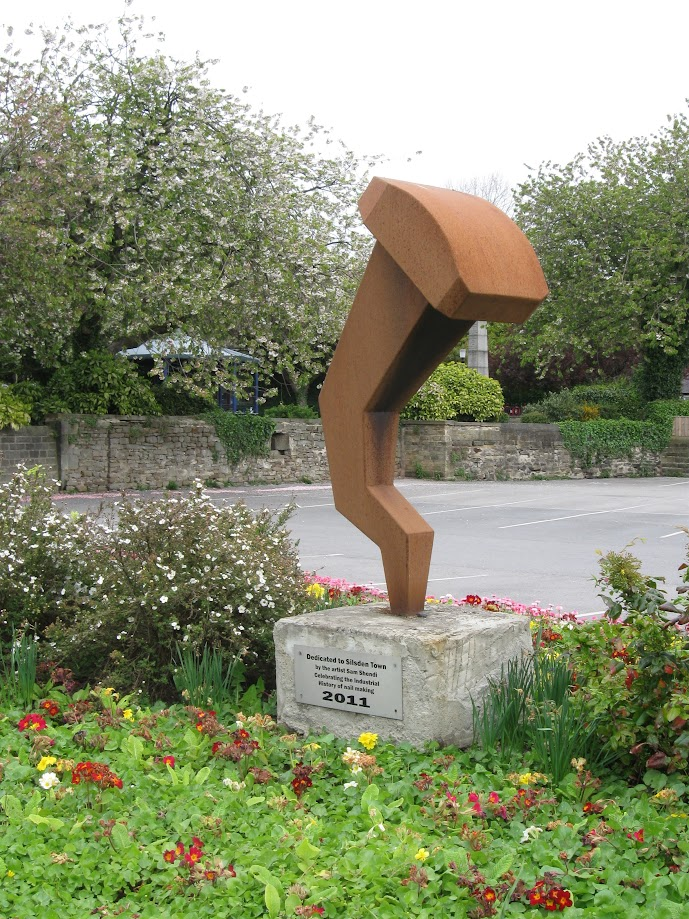
Bent Nail by Sam Shendi – Wesley Place, Silsden

Nail making can be traced back to the late 1700s when the Leeds and Liverpool Canal gave ready access to remote markets and easier access to raw materials from the forges in Leeds. By the mid 1800s there was steady work for over 100 men and boys making nails throughout the town. A wide variety of specialist nails was made, including joiners nails, horse shoe nails, shoe and clog nails. These latter "cobbler's nails" gave Silsden its nickname of "Cobbydale". The nail making history was commemorated by an art installation in 2011 in Wesley Place (on the site of the long gone original fire station) called "Bent Nail" by Sam Shendi.

There is still industry in the town, some in old mill buildings and some in a new industrial estate between the town and the river. The town retains a very small amount of manufacturing.

The Leeds and Liverpool Canal became a key element of local infrastructure upon its completion in 1816. Silsden was then connected to both a significant manufacturing city (Leeds) and a major ocean port (Liverpool) by canal. Canal boats allowed for cheap transportation of bulk goods, especially coal and wool, to the area.

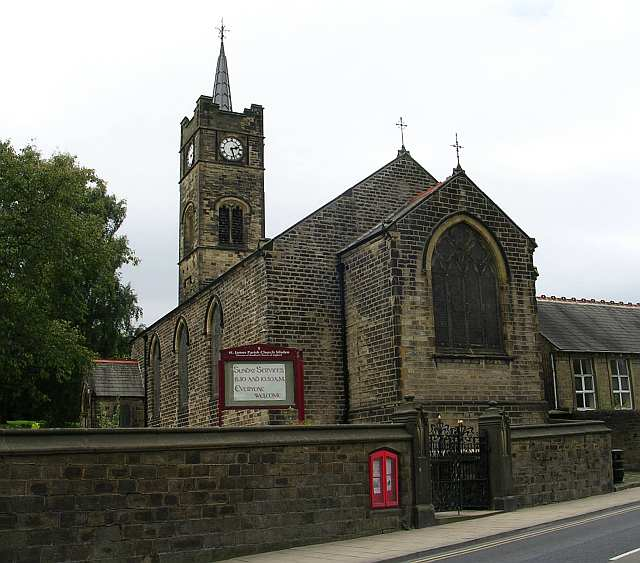
St. James' Church, Kirkgate

In 1911, there was a riot in Silsden when the police station was attacked after an unpopular policeman had been too enthusiastic in his duties. Questions were raised in the House of Commons and it was reported in the national press. The policeman was removed from the town and no more trouble occurred.

During the 1940s, a hostel was built off Howden Road, to house refugees and prisoners of war from various countries. The area is now a housing estate, and there is a plaque, erected by the local Ukrainian community in 1988, to commemorate the hostel on Ings Way.

In 1998, a hoard of 27 gold coins dating back to the 1st century AD were found in the town and subsequently valued at £20,000 by experts appointed by the Department of Culture, Media and Sport.

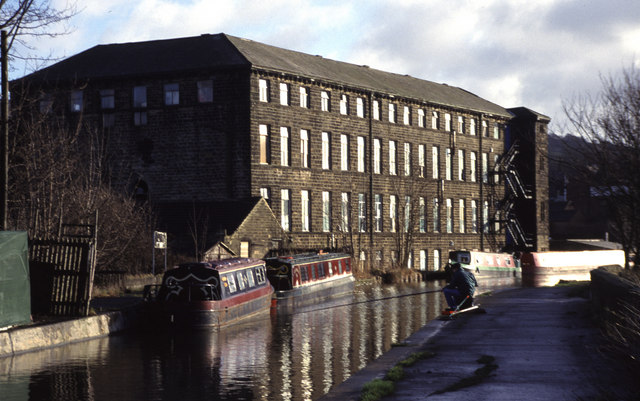
Waterloo Mills

The Guinness Book of World Records reported that the biggest onion ever, at 14 lb (6.4 kg), was grown in Silsden in 2010 by Vincent Throup. However this has since been beaten.

On 6 July 2014, Stage 2 of the 2014 Tour de France from York to Sheffield passed through the town.

=== Brunthwaite ===
The hamlet of Brunthwaite lies about 1/2 mile (800 metres) east of the centre of Silsden, near Brunthwaite Beck and at the foot of Rombalds Moor. Land here formed a small manor from Saxon times, and the first known written mention of the name (as Bronthweyt) occurs in the 14th century. The oldest buildings in the present settlement are from an 18th-century farming community. The hamlet was designated as a conservation area in 1977, which was reassessed by Bradford Council in 2005.

== Governance ==
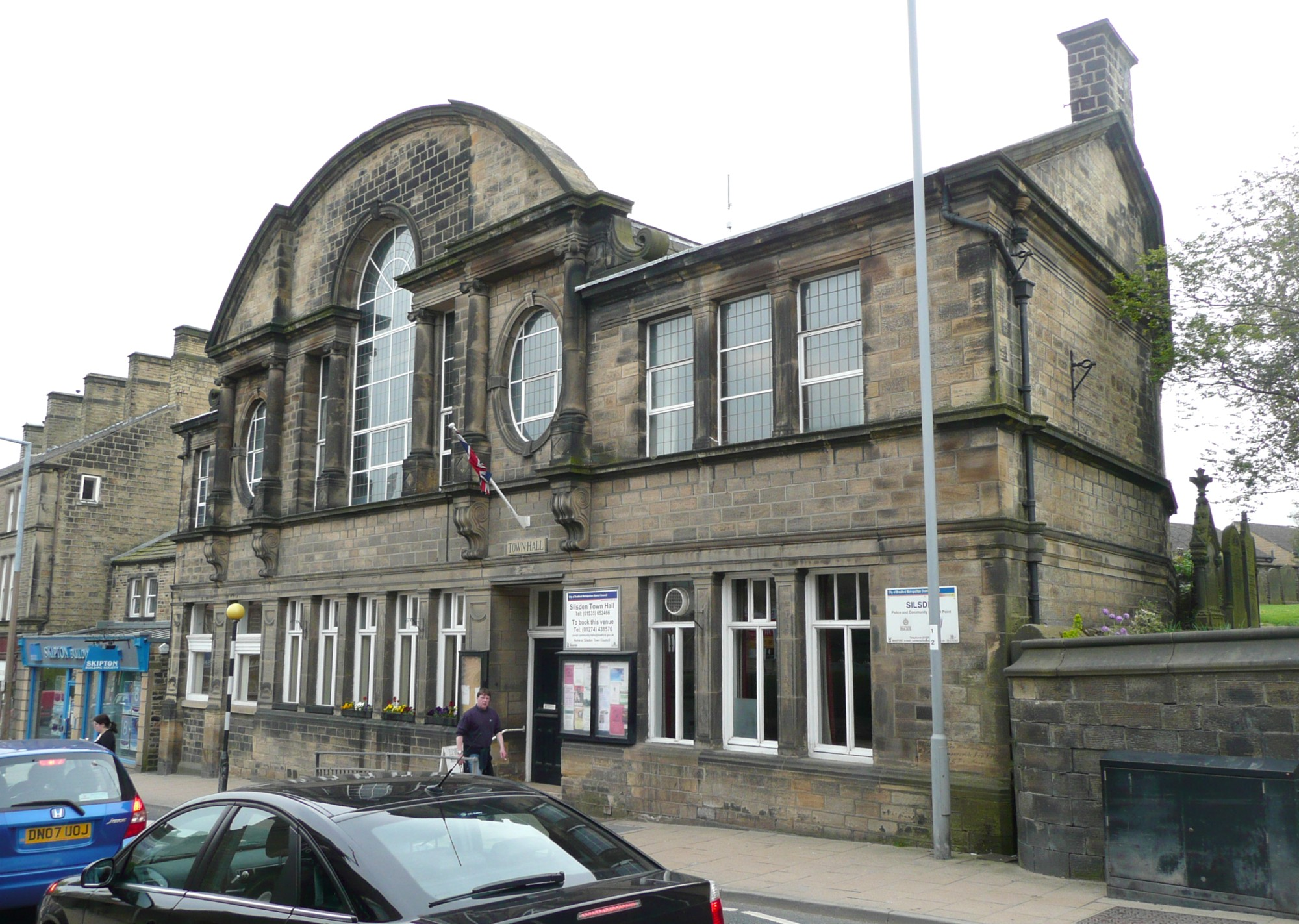
Silsden Town Hall

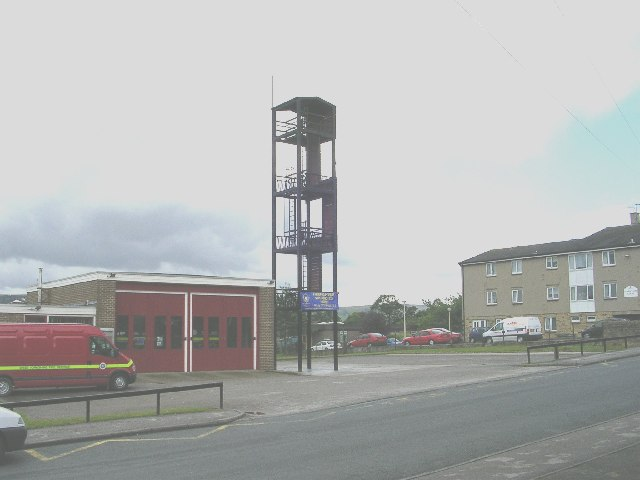
Silsden Fire Station

Silsden has been administered by the City of Bradford Metropolitan District Council since 1974. It also has its own town council which is based at Silsden Town Hall.

Until May 2026, the town was part of the Bradford Council's Craven ward.

== Community ==
Silsden has eight public houses: the Robin Hood, the Counting House, the Red Lion, the Duck Pond, the Post Office, the Butchers Arms, the Punch Bowl, and the King's Arms. There are two members' clubs: Sunnybank Social Club and Twisters Social Club.

Whilst Silsden does not have its own railway station, the Steeton and Silsden railway station is one mile (1.5 kilometres) south in the village of Steeton. The station provides a link for commuters to the cities of Leeds and Bradford.

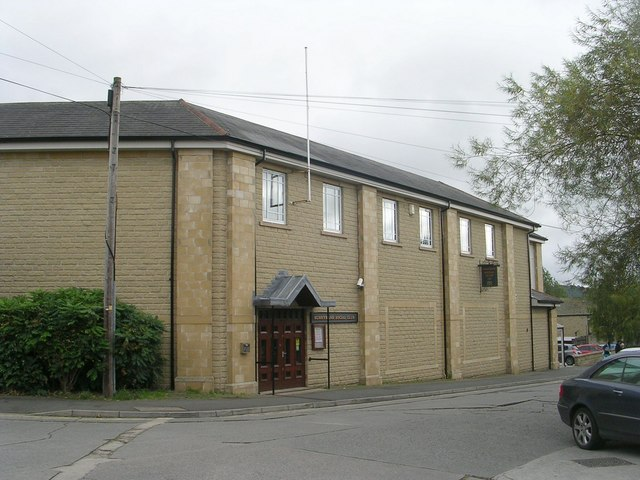
Sunnybank Social Club

Lying between Keighley and Ilkley, Silsden is served by buses to both these towns. Silsden's public transport benefits from Silsden being part of West Yorkshire rather than North Yorkshire, the border of which runs along one end of the town.

== Notable people ==
The Lampkin family lived at Silsden during the Second World War. Lampkin brothers Arthur, Alan and Martin were, later, national motorcycle trials champions. Martin Lampkin won the 1975 FIM Trial World Championship and his son, Douglas "Dougie" Lampkin, is a twelve-time trials world champion.

The Wainman family, a second motorsport dynasty from Silsden, compete in BriSCA Formula 1 Stock Cars. Frankie Wainman was World Champion in 1979, while his son Frankie Wainman Junior is one of the most successful drivers in the history of the sport.

English rugby league player Jack Reed, who played for the Brisbane Broncos, was born in Silsden.

Henry Price started his first Fifty Shilling Tailors shop in Silsden. With this fortune, the now Sir Henry Price, bought Wakehurst Place, Ardingly, West Sussex, which is now owned by the National Trust.

Margaret Wintringham, née Longbottom, was a British Liberal Party politician. She was the second woman to take her seat in the House of Commons and lived in Silsden when her father was the head teacher at Bolton Road School.

== Media ==
Local news and television programmes are provided by BBC Yorkshire and ITV Yorkshire. Television signals are received from the Emley Moor TV transmitter, and the Keighley relay transmitter.

Local radio stations are BBC Radio Leeds on 102.7 FM, Capital Yorkshire on 105.6 FM, Heart Yorkshire on 107.6 FM, Hits Radio West Yorkshire on 97.5 FM, Greatest Hits Radio West Yorkshire on 96.3 FM, and Rombalds Radio, a community based radio station that broadcast online.

The town is served by the local newspapers, Keighley News and Telegraph & Argus.

=== Other media ===
On 27 April 1995, a one-off anthology supernatural drama series Chiller aired, in which episode 5, titled "Number Six", featured Silsden. It was featured for almost the entire one-hour episode, using locations across the town.

Bonapartes Restaurant, on Kirkgate, was the subject of the first-ever episode of Gordon Ramsay's Kitchen Nightmares in 2004. After the show aired, the restaurant's owner Sue Ray threatened to take legal action against Ramsay, Channel 4 and the programme makers, Optomen, after claiming that the show put her £400,000 in debt. Christine Hall, producer of Kitchen Nightmares, refused to accept the blame, stating that Ray only had herself to blame. The programme revisited the restaurant in the second series, but Ray would only talk to Ramsay off-camera. In June 2006, Ramsay won a High Court case against the London Evening Standard, which had alleged, after reports from Ray, that scenes and the general condition of Bonapartes had been faked. Ramsay was awarded £75,000 plus costs. Ramsay said at the time: "I won't let people write anything they want to about me. We have never done anything in a cynical, fake way."

In July 2007, the butchers, barbers and shoe shop located on Bradley Road were used in an episode of ITV's The Royal.

== See also ==
- Listed buildings in Silsden
