= Coat of arms of Bradford =

- Armiger: City of Bradford Metropolitan District Council
- Adopted: 2 January 1976
- Crest: Upon a mural crown per pale Gules and Azure a boar's head sans tongue erased Or.
- Shield: Per pale Gules and Azure on a chevron engrailed between in chief two buglehorns stringed and in base a fleece Or a Fountain the whole within a bordure gobony of the first and Argent charged on the Gules with eleven roses of the last barbed and seeded Proper.
- Supporters: On the dexter side a stag Or gorged with a collar Azure thereon three roses Argent barbed and seeded Proper and on the sinister side an Angora Goat Argent horned Or gorged with a collar Gules charged with three like roses.
- Motto: Progress, Industry, Humanity

The coat of arms of Bradford is that granted to the City of Bradford Metropolitan District Council in 1976. The council is the local authority for the district of Bradford, West Yorkshire, England. The coat of arms is based on those of Bradford Corporation, the local authority for the County Borough of Bradford, both of which were abolished in 1974.

== Symbolism ==
The red and blue "per pale" division of the shield, gold engrailed chevron and bugles were taken directly from the county borough's arms. The buglehorns refer to the service by which the manor of Bradford was granted by John of Gaunt to John Northrop of Manningham: upon the blowing of a horn on St Martin's day Manningham was to wait on John and his heirs and conduct them safely to Pontefract Castle. In the county borough's arms there were three horns: one has been replaced by a golden fleece. This is an emblem of the woollen industry and was found in the arms or devices of five urban districts included in the metropolitan borough in 1974. On the chevron is an heraldic fountain from the arms of borough of Keighley and Ilkley urban district. A bordure or border has been added to the shield, on which are placed eleven white roses, representing the eleven Yorkshire councils combined in 1974.

The crest features a boar's head without a tongue. This illustrates the legend of the boar of Cliffe Wood.

The supporters are a gold stag from the arms of the Cavendish family, associated with Keighley; and an angora goat, another emblem of the woollen industry.

The motto is Progress, Industry, Humanity.

== Sources ==
- Aspects of Heraldry – Journal of the Yorkshire Heraldry Society, No.16, 2002
- G. Briggs, Civic and Corporate Heraldry, London 1971
- W. C. Scott-Giles, Civic Heraldry of England and Wales, 2nd edition, London, 1953
- W. H. Fox-Talbot, The Book of Public Arms, London 1915
