= Silsden Town Hall =

Municipal building in Silsden, West Yorkshire, England

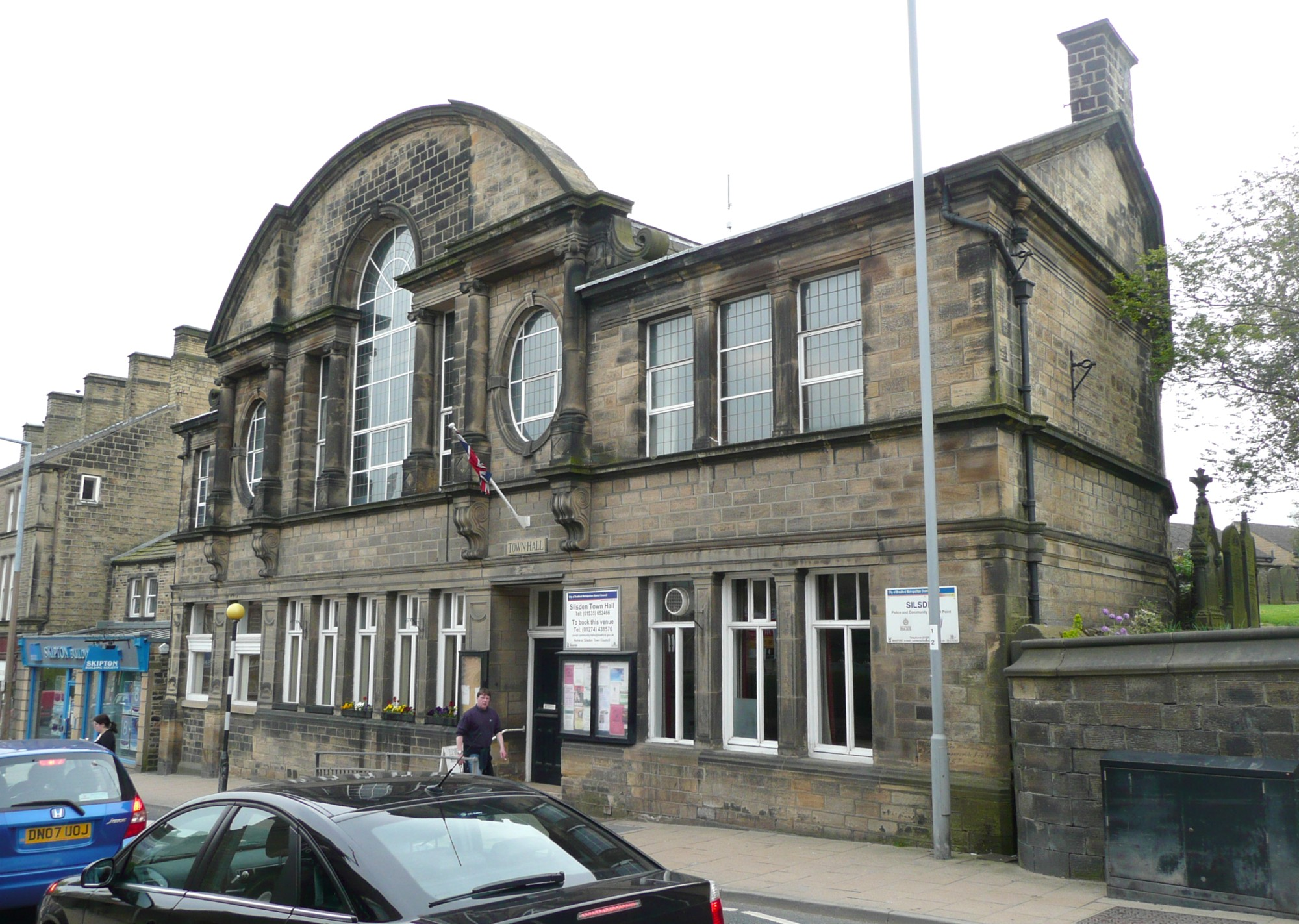
- Silsden Town Hall

- Shown in West Yorkshire
- 53.9138°N 1.9380°W
- Location: Kirkgate, Silsden

History
- Built: 1894

Site notes
- Architectural style: Victorian style

Silsden Town Hall is a municipal building in Kirkgate, Silsden, West Yorkshire, England. The town hall is the meeting place of Silsden Town Council.

== History ==
The building was originally commissioned as a permanent home for the local mechanics' institute; lectures for interested students had been held on an informal basis in the Red Lion Inn before the trustees of the institute decided to find a permanent home. The site they selected, which was made available for a nominal sum by the previous owner, Lord Hothfield, was adjacent to the churchyard of St. James' Church, Kirkgate.

The foundation stone for the new building was laid by Lord Hothfield, whose seat was at Skipton Castle, in December 1893. It was designed in the Victorian style, built with ashlar stone at a cost of £2,000 and was officially opened by Lord Hothfield in October 1894. The design involved an asymmetrical main frontage with eight bays facing onto Kirkgate; the central section of three bays featured a doorway in the right hand bay on the ground floor; there was a Venetian window in the centre bay with oculi flanked by Ionic order columns on the first floor and an open segmental pediment above. Internally, the principal room was the main hall which featured an ornate wooden roof structure.

After the popularity of mechanics' institutes reduced in the late 19th century, Silsden Urban District Council, which had been formed in 1894, took over the management of the building and converted it into a town hall in 1907. A council chamber was established on the ground floor. A book of remembrance, commemorating the lives of local service personnel who had died in the First World War, was put on display in the town hall after the war.

The building continued to serve as a meeting place for Silsden Urban District Council for much of the 20th century but ceased to be the local seat of government after the enlarged City of Bradford Metropolitan District Council was formed in 1974. A multi-use service hub to support small businesses was established in the town hall in September 2008. Following the completion of a programme of refurbishment works costing £300,000, Silsden Library moved from Wesley Place into the former council chamber on the ground floor of the town hall in November 2013. The works also involved the removal of a false ceiling in the main hall, so exposing the original ornate wooden roof structure. A community group, known as The Friends of Silsden Town Hall, was established in 2014 with responsibility for promoting the use of the town hall through pantomimes, exhibitions, presentations and other events. The new arrangements, which were formalised when trustees took a long lease on the building in April 2019, also saw the town hall returning to municipal use as the meeting place of Silsden Town Council.

In 2023, welcomed a selection of notable artists and comedians to perform in its ballroom. From 2023 to 2025, under the artistic direction of Samuel Deakin, Silsden Town Hall hosted concerts from Kiki Dee, The Three Degrees, D:Ream and Dervish and comedy shows from Mick Miller, Stan Boardman and Hal Cruttenden, with three sold out performances by local comic, Billy Pearce.

Silsden Town Hall received funding from the council's Cultural Capital Fund, to further develop its technical capabilities, in 2025.
