= 1975 City of Bradford Metropolitan District Council election =

Elections to City of Bradford Metropolitan District Council were held on 1 May 1975, with one third of the seats up for election. The election resulted in the Conservatives retaining control. Voter turnout was 34.0%.

== Election result ==
Bradford local election result 1975
Party	Seats	Gains	Losses	Net gain/loss	Seats %	Votes %	Votes	+/−
Conservative	21	4	0	+4	67.7	51.2	56,741	+8.4%
Labour	8	0	3	-3	33.3	31.4	34,815	-5.3%
Liberal	2	0	1	-1	9.7	11.8	13,138	-0.6%
Ratepayers & Residents Association	0	0	0	0	0.0	2.1	2,327	+2.1%
National Front	0	0	0	0	0.0	1.2	1,364	+1.2%
British Campaign to Stop Immigration	0	0	0	0	0.0	0.9	1,051	-4.2%
Independent	0	0	0	0	0.0	0.6	718	-1.7%
Independent Labour	0	0	0	0	0.0	0.4	403	+0.4%
Communist	0	0	0	0	0.0	0.2	235	-0.1%
Social Credit	0	0	0	0	0.0	0.1	106	+0.0%

This result had the following consequences for the total number of seats on the council after the elections:

Party	Previous council	New council
Conservatives	53	57
Labour	31	28
Liberals	9	8
Total	93	93
Working majority	13	21

== Ward results ==
Allerton
Party	Candidate	Votes	%	±%
Conservative	A. Pollard	2,614	58.7	+19.8
Labour	F. Longstaff	1,295	29.1	+3.4
Liberal	K. Stoodley	540	12.1	−15.4
Majority		1,319	29.6	+18.2
Turnout		4,449	36.0	
Conservative hold		Swing	+8.2	

Baildon
Party	Candidate	Votes	%	±%
Liberal	P. Atkinson	2,442	45.5	+9.0
Conservative	L. Lancaster	1,961	36.5	−4.1
Labour	H. Lambert	969	18.0	−4.9
Majority		481	8.9	+4.8
Turnout		5,372	47.7	
Liberal hold		Swing	+6.5	

Bingley: Central, East, North & West
Party	Candidate	Votes	%	±%
Conservative	T. Shaw	2,672	53.7	−7.1
Liberal	P. Blaine	1,235	24.8	+24.8
Labour	J. Tatham	1,072	21.5	−17.7
Majority		1,437	28.9	+7.3
Turnout		4,979	41.0	
Conservative hold		Swing	-15.9	

Bolton
Party	Candidate	Votes	%	±%
Conservative	T. Hall	1,649	48.7	+15.5
Labour	J. Lambert	916	27.0	+3.5
Liberal	A. South	822	24.3	−9.9
Majority		733	21.6	+20.6
Turnout		3,387	33.2	
Conservative hold		Swing	+6.0	

Bowling
Party	Candidate	Votes	%	±%
Labour	D. Coughlin	836	44.0	−15.4
Conservative	J. Ambler	743	39.1	−1.4
Liberal	L. Terrington	319	16.8	+16.8
Majority		93	4.9	−14.0
Turnout		1,898	25.0	
Labour hold		Swing	-7.0	

Bradford Moor
Party	Candidate	Votes	%	±%
Conservative	J. Rees	1,331	36.3	+2.1
Labour	M. Thornton	1,282	35.0	−8.0
British Campaign to Stop Immigration	J. Merrick	1,051	28.7	+9.5
Majority		49	1.3	−7.4
Turnout		3,664	33.6	
Conservative gain from Labour		Swing	+5.0	

Clayton & Queensbury
Party	Candidate	Votes	%	±%
Conservative	J. Hirst	3,293	66.8	+13.9
Labour	D. Hoyle	1,457	29.6	−4.6
Communist	J. Baruch	179	3.6	+3.6
Majority		1,836	37.2	+18.5
Turnout		4,929	31.0	
Conservative hold		Swing	+9.2	

Craven: Silsden, Addingham, Kildwick & Steeton with Eastburn
Party	Candidate	Votes	%	±%
Conservative	K. Hawkins	2,355	56.0	+21.0
Liberal	D. Robinson	1,025	24.4	+5.4
Labour	I. Newton	731	17.4	−4.2
National Front	A. Fairey	92	2.2	+2.2
Majority		1,330	31.6	+20.9
Turnout		4,203	45.9	
Conservative hold		Swing	+7.8	

Denholme, Cullingworth, Bingley South & Wilsden
Party	Candidate	Votes	%	±%
Conservative	L. Fullylove	2,430	58.7	−11.4
Liberal	M. Greenwood	916	22.1	+22.1
Labour	J. Tough	792	19.1	−10.7
Majority		1,514	36.6	−3.6
Turnout		4,138	40.1	
Conservative hold		Swing	-16.7	

Eccleshill
Party	Candidate	Votes	%	±%
Conservative	W. Riggs	1,502	43.2	+13.0
Labour	G. Midwood	1,019	29.3	+2.0
Liberal	W. Sheffield	805	23.2	−13.2
National Front	A. Farrow	147	4.2	+4.2
Majority		483	13.9	+7.8
Turnout		3,473	33.0	
Conservative gain from Liberal		Swing	+5.5	

Great Horton
Party	Candidate	Votes	%	±%
Conservative	J. Rawnsley	2,116	54.5	+9.0
Labour	G. Avis	1,218	31.4	−9.1
Ratepayers & Residents Association	H. Baines	530	14.2	+14.2
Majority		898	23.1	+18.1
Turnout		3,884	38.3	
Conservative hold		Swing	+9.0	

Haworth, Oakworth & Oxenhope
Party	Candidate	Votes	%	±%
Conservative	S. Midgley	2,577	65.6	+13.7
Labour	D. Hanson	1,180	31.4	−13.7
Majority		1,397	37.2	+27.4
Turnout		3,757	32.4	
Conservative hold		Swing	+13.7	

Heaton
Party	Candidate	Votes	%	±%
Conservative	L. Hamer	2,755	74.2	+25.5
Labour	P. Birkby	960	25.8	+4.0
Majority		1,795	48.3	+21.4
Turnout		3,715	33.7	
Conservative hold		Swing	+10.7	

Idle
Party	Candidate	Votes	%	±%
Liberal	A. Bagshaw	1,516	34.9	−13.3
Conservative	H. Worsley	1,069	24.6	+0.6
Labour	K. Hemingway	948	21.8	+2.4
Independent	T. Keighley	718	16.5	+16.5
National Front	G. Robinson	98	2.2	+2.2
Majority		447	10.3	−13.8
Turnout		4,349	37.5	
Liberal hold		Swing	-6.9	

Ilkley: Ben Rhydding, Ilkley North, South & West
Party	Candidate	Votes	%	±%
Conservative	H. Illingworth	1,985	47.5	−9.0
Ratepayers & Residents Association	G. Harwood	1,777	42.5	+42.5
Labour	O. Hanson	417	10.0	−9.3
Majority		208	5.0	−32.3
Turnout		4,179	43.0	
Conservative hold		Swing	-25.7	

Ilkley: Burley, Holme & Menston
Party	Candidate	Votes	%	±%
Conservative	J. Spencer	2,094	53.4	+6.5
Liberal	P. Normandale	1,395	35.6	−1.7
Labour	D. Warwick	434	11.1	−4.9
Majority		699	17.8	+8.2
Turnout		3,923	53.5	
Conservative hold		Swing	+4.1	

Keighley: Keighley Central, East & South
Party	Candidate	Votes	%	±%
Labour	W. Clarkson	1,716	43.9	−24.1
Conservative	H. Harrison	1,407	36.0	+4.1
Liberal	M. Heraty	540	13.8	+13.8
National Front	G. Wright	242	6.2	+6.2
Majority		309	7.9	−28.3
Turnout		3,905	36.1	
Labour hold		Swing	-14.1	

Keighley: Morton & Keighley North East
Party	Candidate	Votes	%	±%
Conservative	H. Milton	1,631	64.0	+8.4
Labour	H. Binns	695	27.3	−17.0
National Front	D. Hudson	221	8.7	+8.7
Majority		936	36.7	+25.4
Turnout		2,547	33.2	
Conservative hold		Swing	+12.7	

Keighley: North West & West
Party	Candidate	Votes	%	±%
Conservative	I. Cowen	2,215	52.5	+14.2
Labour	A. Keller	1,766	41.9	−2.9
National Front	J. Smith	237	5.6	+5.6
Majority		449	10.6	+4.1
Turnout		4,218	36.2	
Conservative gain from Labour		Swing	+8.5	

Laisterdyke
Party	Candidate	Votes	%	±%
Labour	T. Wood	952	60.5	−1.2
Conservative	C. York	621	39.5	+15.1
Majority		331	21.0	−16.3
Turnout		1,573	21.7	
Labour hold		Swing	-8.1	

Little Horton
Party	Candidate	Votes	%	±%
Labour	J. McElroy	1,565	54.4	−5.3
Conservative	A. Townsend	1,313	45.6	+22.1
Majority		252	8.8	−27.4
Turnout		2,878	25.0	
Labour hold		Swing	-13.7	

Manningham
Party	Candidate	Votes	%	±%
Conservative	R. Smith	1,704	52.9	+21.2
Labour	C. Khan	1,096	34.0	+7.8
Liberal	C. Mennell	317	9.8	+9.8
Social Credit	J. Jennings	106	3.3	+0.4
Majority		608	18.9	+15.8
Turnout		3,223	27.7	
Conservative hold		Swing	+6.7	

Odsal
Party	Candidate	Votes	%	±%
Conservative	C. Lang	1,836	55.9	+6.0
Labour	D. Mangham	1,447	44.1	+1.5
Majority		389	11.8	+4.6
Turnout		3,283	30.9	
Conservative hold		Swing	+2.2	

Shipley: Central, North & East
Party	Candidate	Votes	%	±%
Labour	M. Wedgworth	2,313	62.4	+0.9
Conservative	G. Mawson	1,339	36.1	+2.0
Communist	L. Sheilds	56	1.5	−2.9
Majority		974	26.3	−1.1
Turnout		3,708	33.3	
Labour hold		Swing	-0.5	

Shipley: South & West
Party	Candidate	Votes	%	±%
Conservative	O. Messer	3,153	70.6	+1.0
Labour	E. Saville	912	20.4	−10.0
Independent Labour	J. Briscoe	403	9.0	+9.0
Majority		2,241	50.2	+11.1
Turnout		4,468	44.3	
Conservative hold		Swing	+5.5	

Thornton
Party	Candidate	Votes	%	±%
Conservative	J. Singleton	1,791	53.1	+12.2
Labour	L. Wassall	809	24.0	−3.3
Liberal	R. Taylor	770	22.8	+5.3
Majority		982	29.1	+15.5
Turnout		3,370	33.6	
Conservative hold		Swing	+7.7	

Tong
Party	Candidate	Votes	%	±%
Labour	D. Smith	1,430	61.6	−12.5
Conservative	L. Heginbotham	891	38.4	+12.5
Majority		539	23.2	−25.0
Turnout		2,321	19.0	
Labour hold		Swing	-12.5	

Undercliffe
Party	Candidate	Votes	%	±%
Conservative	H. Ibbotson	1,258	44.0	−6.3
Labour	R. Kitson	980	34.3	−15.4
Liberal	L. Woodcock	496	17.3	+17.3
National Front	W. Collins	124	4.3	+4.3
Majority		278	9.7	+9.0
Turnout		2,858	31.9	
Conservative hold		Swing	+4.5	

University
Party	Candidate	Votes	%	±%
Labour	B. Rhodes	1,179	51.0	+2.4
Conservative	T. Dines	931	40.2	+12.0
National Front	T. Brown	203	8.8	+8.8
Majority		248	10.7	−9.7
Turnout		2,313	27.4	
Labour hold		Swing	-4.8	

Wibsey
Party	Candidate	Votes	%	±%
Conservative	R. Gross	1,928	66.4	+10.5
Labour	F. Bastow	974	33.6	−0.6
Majority		954	32.9	+11.1
Turnout		2,902	27.2	
Conservative hold		Swing	+5.5	

Wyke
Party	Candidate	Votes	%	±%
Conservative	R. Slicer	1,577	52.0	+19.9
Labour	L. Kearns	1,455	48.0	−19.9
Majority		122	4.0	−31.7
Turnout		3,032	25.3	
Conservative gain from Labour		Swing	+19.9	
