= Keighley East =

Coordinates: 53.870°N 1.871°W

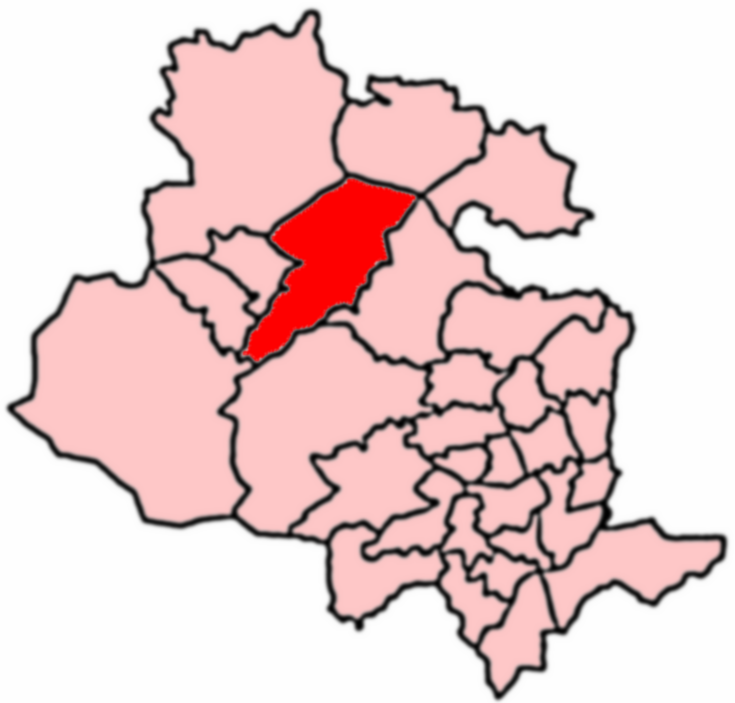
- 2004 Boundaries of Keighley East Ward
- Population: 16,775 (ward.2011)
- UK Parliament: Keighley
- Councillors: Stephen Pullen (Labour); Doreen Lee (Labour); Malcolm Slater (Labour)

Keighley East (population 14,929 - 2001 UK census) is a ward within the City of Bradford Metropolitan District Council in the county of West Yorkshire, England. The population had increased to 16,775 at the 2011 Census.

Within the Ward of Keighley East are the villages of East and West Morton and the Keighley suburbs of Riddlesden and Long Lee.

== Councillors ==
Keighley East ward is represented on Bradford Council by three Labour Party councillors, Stephen Pullen, Doreen Lee, and Malcolm Slater.

Election	Councillor	Councillor	Councillor
2004	Mark Francis Statin (Con)	Dorothy Clamp (Con)	Malcolm Slater (Lab)
2006	Stephen Pullen (Lab)	Dorothy Clamp (Con)	Malcolm Slater (Lab)
2007	Stephen Pullen (Lab)	Doreen Lee (Lab)	Malcolm Slater (Lab)
2008	Stephen Pullen (Lab)	Doreen Lee (Lab)	Dorothy Clamp (Con)
2010	Stephen Pullen (Lab)	Doreen Lee (Lab)	Dorothy Clamp (Con)
2011	Stephen Pullen (Lab)	Doreen Lee (Lab)	Dorothy Clamp (Con)
2012	Stephen Pullen (Lab)	Doreen Lee (Lab)	Malcolm Slater (Lab)
2014	Stephen Pullen (Lab)	Doreen Lee (Lab)	Malcolm Slater (Lab)
2015	Stephen Pullen (Lab)	Doreen Lee (Lab)	Malcolm Slater (Lab)
2016	Stephen Pullen (Lab)	Doreen Lee (Lab)	Malcolm Slater (Lab)
2018	Caroline Firth (Lab)	Doreen Lee (Lab)	Malcolm Slater (Lab)
2019	Caroline Firth (Lab)	Doreen Lee (Lab)	Malcolm Slater (Lab)
2021	Caroline Firth (Lab)	Doreen Lee (Lab)	Malcolm Slater (Lab)
2022	Caroline Firth (Lab)	Doreen Lee (Lab)	Malcolm Slater (Lab)
2023	Caroline Firth (Lab)	Lisa Robinson (Lab)	Malcolm Slater (Lab)
2024	Caroline Firth (Lab)	Lisa Robinson (Lab)	Fulzar Ahmed (Lab)

indicates seat up for re-election.
