= 1988 City of Bradford Metropolitan District Council election =

1988 UK local government election

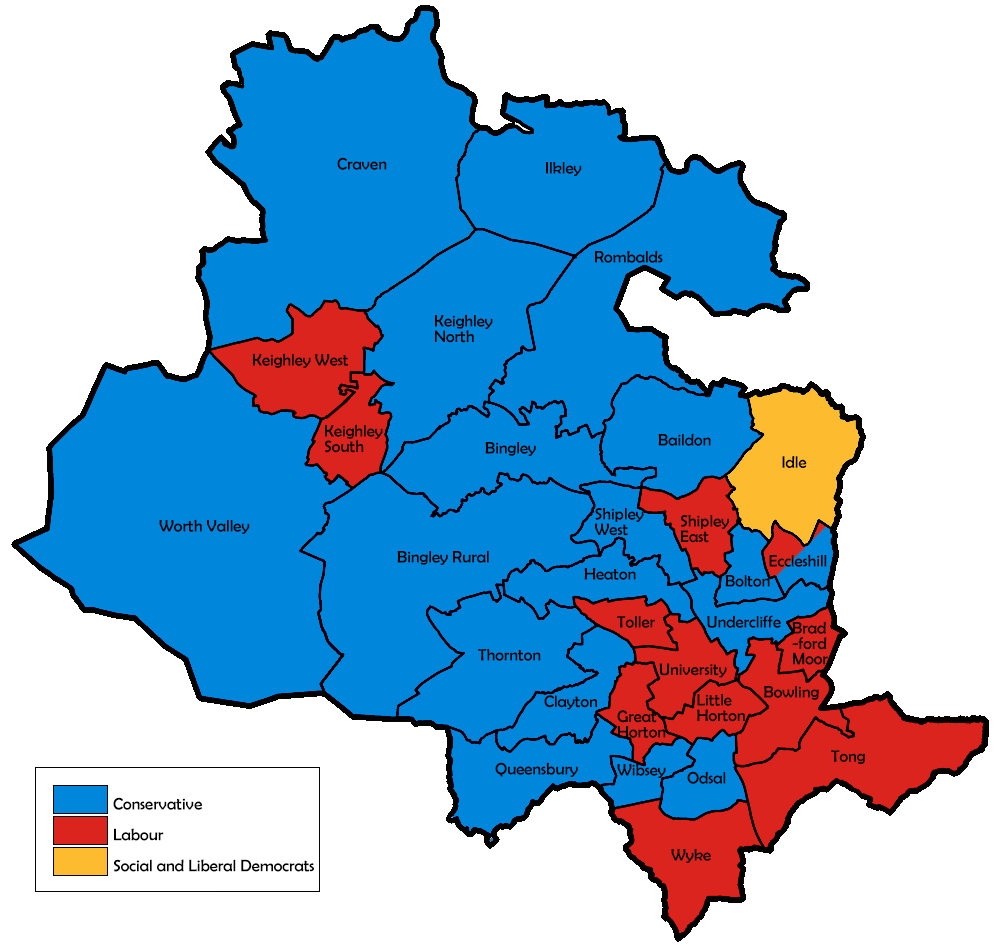
Map of the results for the 1988 Bradford council election.

The 1988 City of Bradford Metropolitan District Council elections were held on Thursday, 5 May 1988, with one third of the council up for election as well as vacancies in Eccleshill & Wyke to be elected. Labour lost control of the council to no overall control following numerous losses to the Conservatives.

== Election result ==
Bradford local election result 1988
Party	Seats	Gains	Losses	Net gain/loss	Seats %	Votes %	Votes	+/−
Conservative	18	6	0	▲6	56.2	43.7	61,462	+3.3
Labour	13	0	5	▼5	40.6	43.1	60,709	+7.9
SLD	1	0	1	▼1	3.1	10.4	14,643	-10.4
SDP	0	0	0	Steady	0.0	1.1	1,522	+1.1
Ratepayers Association	0	0	0	Steady	0.0	1.0	1,446	-2.2
Green	0	0	0	Steady	0.0	0.3	479	+0.0
Independent	0	0	0	Steady	0.0	0.2	305	+0.2
Independent Labour	0	0	0	Steady	0.0	0.1	189	+0.1

This result had the following consequences for the total number of seats on the council after the elections:

Party	Previous council	New council
Labour	49	44
Conservatives	38	44
Social and Liberal Democrats	3	2
Total	90	90
Working majority	8	-2

== Ward results ==
Baildon
Party	Candidate	Votes	%	±%
Conservative	R. Cope	2,769	44.1	+0.1
SLD	S. Duckham	2,560	40.8	−2.2
Labour	P. Lancaster	757	12.1	+0.7
Green	C. Harris	191	3.0	+1.4
Majority		209	3.3	+2.3
Turnout		5,420		
Conservative gain from SLD		Swing	+1.1	

Bingley
Party	Candidate	Votes	%	±%
Conservative	G. Seager	2,415	52.6	+11.8
Labour	E. Sinclair	1,487	32.4	+10.5
SLD	M. Fielden	358	7.8	−10.8
Ratepayers Association	R. Reay	251	5.5	−13.3
Majority		928	20.2	+1.2
Turnout		4,594		
Conservative hold		Swing	+0.6	

Bingley Rural
Party	Candidate	Votes	%	±%
Conservative	P. Pettit	2,600	56.9	+9.4
Labour	M. Gregory	973	21.3	+7.9
Ratepayers Association	L. Reay	615	13.5	−7.5
SLD	M. Thornton	379	8.3	−9.8
Majority		1,627	35.6	+9.0
Turnout		4,566		
Conservative hold		Swing	+0.8	

Bolton
Party	Candidate	Votes	%	±%
Conservative	M. Gaunt	2,039	51.4	+5.6
Labour	R. Kitson	1,546	39.0	+6.7
SLD	M. Thornton	379	9.6	−12.4
Majority		493	12.4	−1.1
Turnout		3,964		
Conservative hold		Swing	-0.5	

Bowling
Party	Candidate	Votes	%	±%
Labour	L. Coughlin	2,645	67.1	+6.4
Conservative	F. Khan	841	21.3	−1.6
SLD	G. Beacher	458	11.6	−4.8
Majority		1,804	45.7	+8.0
Turnout		3,944		
Labour hold		Swing	+4.0	

Bradford Moor
Party	Candidate	Votes	%	±%
Labour	G. Khaliq	2,470	60.9	+4.5
Conservative	J. Rees	942	23.2	−2.9
SLD	I. Horner	338	8.3	−9.1
Independent	M. Khan	305	7.5	+7.5
Majority		1,528	37.7	+7.4
Turnout		4,055		
Labour hold		Swing	+3.7	

Clayton
Party	Candidate	Votes	%	±%
Conservative	A. Owen	3,127	56.4	+2.2
Labour	G. Sutcliffe	2,420	43.6	+11.5
Majority		707	12.7	−9.4
Turnout		5,547		
Conservative gain from Labour		Swing	-4.6	

Craven
Party	Candidate	Votes	%	±%
Conservative	E. Waddington	2,803	53.7	+10.9
SLD	A. Gale	1,425	27.3	−16.7
Labour	L. Whiteley	996	19.1	+5.9
Majority		1,378	26.4	+25.1
Turnout		5,224		
Conservative hold		Swing	+13.8	

Eccleshill
Party	Candidate	Votes	%	±%
Labour	A. Dewhirst	1,934	47.4	+8.8
Conservative	B. Larkin	1,780	43.6	+2.0
Labour	P. Donohue	1,775		
Conservative	M. Roberts	1,599		
SLD	J. Taylor	368	9.0	−10.9
SLD	J. Midgley	346		
Majority		154	3.8	+0.8
Turnout		4,082		
Labour hold		Swing		
Conservative gain from Labour		Swing	+3.4	

Great Horton
Party	Candidate	Votes	%	±%
Labour	P. Deeny	2,383	53.3	+10.2
Conservative	V. Owen	1,742	39.0	−3.3
SLD	P. Joseph-Gray	181	4.0	−10.5
SDP	D. Hartley	165	3.7	+3.7
Majority		641	14.3	+13.5
Turnout		4,471		
Labour hold		Swing	+6.7	

Heaton
Party	Candidate	Votes	%	±%
Conservative	J. King	2,651	49.4	+5.2
Labour	V. Fanning	2,270	42.3	+7.0
SDP	J. Hewitt	278	5.2	+5.2
SLD	B. Salmons	164	3.1	−12.0
Majority		381	7.1	−1.8
Turnout		5,363		
Conservative hold		Swing	-0.9	

Idle
Party	Candidate	Votes	%	±%
SLD	D. Ward	1,836	37.2	+6.0
Labour	K. Baxter	1,608	32.6	+2.4
Conservative	M. Barnes	1,485	30.1	−3.2
Majority		228	4.6	+2.5
Turnout		4,929		
SLD hold		Swing	+1.8	

Ilkley
Party	Candidate	Votes	%	±%
Conservative	A. Blann	2,900	61.6	+7.9
Labour	J. Liuba	941	20.0	+8.3
SLD	D. Price	728	15.5	−19.0
Ratepayers Association	P. Cheney	135	2.9	+2.9
Majority		1,959	41.6	+22.4
Turnout		4,704		
Conservative hold		Swing	-0.2	

Keighley North
Party	Candidate	Votes	%	±%
Conservative	K. Jepson	2,545	48.4	+7.5
Labour	S. Price	2,297	43.7	+7.5
SLD	S. Green	412	7.8	−15.0
Majority		248	4.7	−0.0
Turnout		5,254		
Conservative gain from Labour		Swing	-0.0	

Keighley South
Party	Candidate	Votes	%	±%
Labour	T. Flanagan	2,738	71.8	+11.5
Conservative	V. Earle	802	21.0	−1.9
SLD	T. Figgess	275	7.2	−9.5
Majority		1,936	50.7	+13.3
Turnout		3,815		
Labour hold		Swing	+6.7	

Keighley West
Party	Candidate	Votes	%	±%
Labour	S. Mitchell	2,397	50.2	+5.2
Conservative	N. Phillips	1,940	40.7	+6.3
SLD	J. Hopkinson	434	9.1	−5.8
Majority		457	9.6	−1.0
Turnout		4,771		
Labour hold		Swing	-0.5	

Little Horton
Party	Candidate	Votes	%	±%
Labour	J. Cairns	2,414	69.5	+10.6
Conservative	G. Johnson	713	20.5	−1.0
Independent Labour	M. Potts	189	5.4	+5.4
SLD	P. Robinson	189	4.5	−15.0
Majority		1,701	49.0	+11.6
Turnout		3,472		
Labour hold		Swing	+5.8	

Odsal
Party	Candidate	Votes	%	±%
Conservative	R. Warren	3,029	49.6	+4.8
Labour	L. Woodward	2,529	41.4	+9.3
SLD	J. Micklethwaite	387	6.3	−16.8
SDP	D. Hartley	165	2.7	+2.7
Majority		500	8.2	−4.5
Turnout		6,110		
Conservative gain from Labour		Swing	-2.2	

Queensbury
Party	Candidate	Votes	%	±%
Conservative	J. Beeson	2,465	45.9	+4.2
Labour	E. Hey	2,315	43.1	+11.5
Ratepayers Association	K. Craven	262	4.9	−7.4
SLD	E. Hallmann	181	3.4	−11.0
SDP	M. Dowson	151	2.8	+2.8
Majority		150	2.8	−7.3
Turnout		5,374		
Conservative hold		Swing	-3.6	

Rombalds
Party	Candidate	Votes	%	±%
Conservative	D. Smith	3,327	62.0	+7.3
Labour	B. Wheeler	1,160	21.6	+6.7
SLD	J. Ryan	877	16.3	−14.0
Majority		2,167	40.4	+16.0
Turnout		5,364		
Conservative hold		Swing	+0.3	

Shipley East
Party	Candidate	Votes	%	±%
Labour	E. English	2,390	59.6	+11.2
Conservative	E. Barraclough	1,277	31.9	+0.8
SLD	F. Marcham	340	8.5	−12.0
Majority		1,113	27.8	+10.5
Turnout		4,007		
Labour hold		Swing	+5.2	

Shipley West
Party	Candidate	Votes	%	±%
Conservative	B. Nunn	2,907	52.4	+8.1
Labour	J. O'Neill	2,060	37.2	+10.6
SLD	B. Moore	575	10.4	−9.2
Majority		847	15.3	−2.4
Turnout		5,542		
Conservative hold		Swing	-1.2	

Thornton
Party	Candidate	Votes	%	±%
Conservative	A. Townsend	2,316	53.2	+5.7
Labour	S. Callaghan	1,569	36.1	+2.2
SLD	A. Griffiths	281	6.5	−5.3
Ratepayers Association	K. McGill	183	4.2	−2.6
Majority		747	17.2	+3.5
Turnout		4,349		
Conservative hold		Swing	+1.7	

Toller
Party	Candidate	Votes	%	±%
Labour	C. Rangzeb	2,905	56.2	+7.3
Conservative	E. Skinner	2,265	43.8	+8.8
Majority		640	12.4	−1.5
Turnout		5,170		
Labour hold		Swing	-0.7	

Tong
Party	Candidate	Votes	%	±%
Labour	J. Senior	2,023	69.0	+8.6
Conservative	J. Holdsworth	709	24.2	+1.3
SDP	R. Dowson	201	6.9	+6.9
Majority		1,314	44.8	+7.2
Turnout		2,933		
Labour hold		Swing	+3.6	

Undercliffe
Party	Candidate	Votes	%	±%
Conservative	G. Moore	1,988	44.8	+10.0
Labour	A. Ahmed	1,881	42.4	−6.7
SLD	D. Midgley	570	12.8	−3.4
Majority		107	2.4	−11.9
Turnout		4,439		
Conservative gain from Labour		Swing	+8.3	

University
Party	Candidate	Votes	%	±%
Labour	M. Ajeeb	4,048	74.2	+15.2
Conservative	A. Khan	904	16.6	−17.3
Green	J. Bird	288	5.3	+0.6
SLD	E. Wilkes	213	3.9	+3.9
Majority		3,144	57.7	+32.5
Turnout		5,453		
Labour hold		Swing	+16.2	

Wibsey
Party	Candidate	Votes	%	±%
Conservative	E. Manogue	1,998	45.5	+1.0
Labour	E. Logan	1,938	44.2	+12.0
SLD	B. Boulton	453	10.2	−13.0
Majority		60	1.3	−11.0
Turnout		4,389		
Conservative hold		Swing	-5.5	

Worth Valley
Party	Candidate	Votes	%	±%
Conservative	G. Hodgson	2,485	58.3	+2.2
Labour	J. Leitch	1,462	34.3	+8.5
SLD	M. Malone	316	7.4	−10.7
Majority		1,023	24.0	−6.3
Turnout		4,263		
Conservative hold		Swing	-3.1	

Wyke
Party	Candidate	Votes	%	±%
Labour	J. Ryan	2,153	49.7	+8.3
Labour	M. Beeley	2,139		
Conservative	R. Warren	1,698	39.2	+5.0
Conservative	A. Murphy	1,564		
SDP	T. Lindley	479	11.1	+11.1
SDP	W. Whitley	468		
Majority		455	10.5	+3.3
Turnout		4,330		
Labour hold		Swing		
Labour hold		Swing	+1.6	
