= 1992 City of Bradford Metropolitan District Council election =

1992 UK local government election

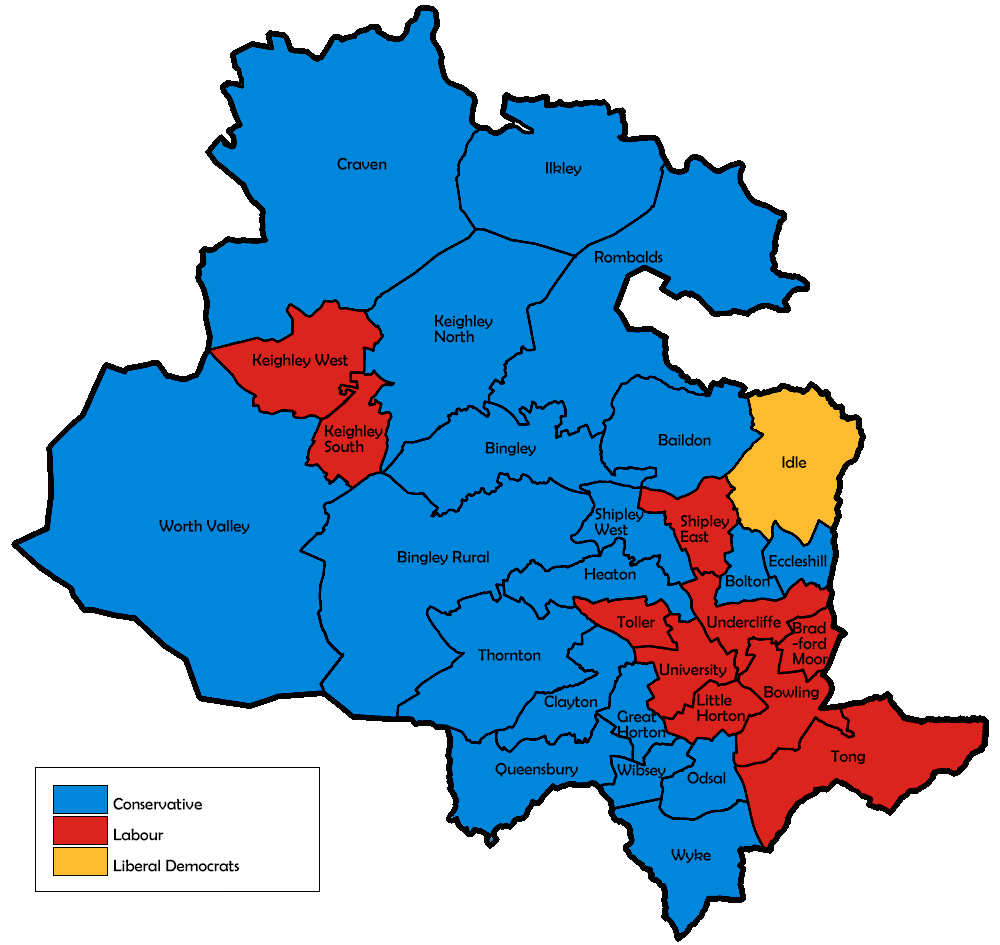
Map of the results for the 1992 Bradford council election.

The 1992 City of Bradford Metropolitan District Council elections were held on Thursday, 7 May 1992, with one third of the council as well as a double vacancy in Heaton to be elected. Labour retained control of the council.

== Election results ==
Bradford local election result 1992
Party	Seats	Gains	Losses	Net gain/loss	Seats %	Votes %	Votes	+/−
Conservative	20	4	1	▲3	64.5	47.4	57,909	+8.8
Labour	10	1	4	▼3	32.2	38.2	46,660	-5.6
Liberal Democrats	1	0	0	Steady	3.2	11.3	13,764	-3.9
Green	0	0	0	Steady	0.0	2.8	3,397	+0.5
Independent	0	0	0	Steady	0.0	0.3	388	+0.2

This result had the following consequences for the total number of seats on the council after the elections:

Party	Previous council	New council
Labour	53	50
Conservative	35	38
Liberal Democrat	2	2
Total	90	90
Working majority	16	10

== Ward results ==
Baildon
Party	Candidate	Votes	%	±%
Conservative	R. Cope	3,003	54.1	+5.4
Liberal Democrats	K. Zanft	1,428	25.7	+1.8
Labour	J. Flood	946	17.0	−5.6
Green	C. Harris	173	3.1	−1.6
Majority		1,575	28.4	+3.7
Turnout		5,550		
Liberal Democrats hold		Swing	+3.7	

Bingley
Party	Candidate	Votes	%	±%
Conservative	C. Hobson	2,549	58.5	+10.4
Labour	M. Gregory	1,298	29.8	−6.4
Liberal Democrats	B. Moore	349	8.0	−3.7
Green	M. Thompson	158	3.6	−0.3
Majority		1,251	28.7	+16.8
Turnout		4,354		
Conservative hold		Swing	+8.4	

Bingley Rural
Party	Candidate	Votes	%	±%
Conservative	P. Pettit	2,903	67.2	+11.0
Labour	F. Needham	837	19.4	−3.8
Liberal Democrats	J. Whitehead	380	8.8	−6.3
Green	M. Love	198	4.6	−1.0
Majority		2,066	47.8	+14.8
Turnout		4,318		
Conservative hold		Swing	+7.4	

Bolton
Party	Candidate	Votes	%	±%
Conservative	M. Gaunt	1,860	52.4	+5.5
Labour	P. Thornton	1,074	30.2	+4.3
Liberal Democrats	H. Middleton	545	15.3	−11.9
Green	W. Taylor	71	2.0	+2.0
Majority		786	22.1	+2.5
Turnout		3,550		
Conservative hold		Swing	+4.9	

Bowling
Party	Candidate	Votes	%	±%
Labour	R. Sankriwala	1,614	52.3	−3.1
Conservative	A. Wade	917	29.7	+7.1
Liberal Democrats	J. Collins	430	13.9	−8.1
Green	K. Spencer	124	4.0	+4.0
Majority		697	22.6	−10.2
Turnout		3,085		
Labour hold		Swing	-5.1	

Bradford Moor
Party	Candidate	Votes	%	±%
Labour	G. Khaliq	1,952	63.0	−4.1
Conservative	H. Ibbotson	757	24.4	+8.8
Liberal Democrats	G. Beacher	236	7.6	−5.4
Green	I. Davis	154	5.0	+0.6
Majority		1,195	38.6	−12.9
Turnout		3,099		
Labour hold		Swing	-6.4	

Clayton
Party	Candidate	Votes	%	±%
Conservative	A. Owen	2,695	61.2	+9.6
Labour	A. Pitts	1,418	32.2	−8.1
Liberal Democrats	K. Margison	203	4.6	3.5
Green	L. Lock	85	1.9	+1.9
Majority		1,277	29.0	+17.6
Turnout		4,401		
Conservative hold		Swing	+8.8	

Craven
Party	Candidate	Votes	%	±%
Conservative	E. Waddington	3,073	66.9	+15.0
Labour	K. Todd	1,037	22.6	+0.9
Liberal Democrats	J. Hopkinson	482	10.5	−12.1
Majority		2,036	44.3	+15.1
Turnout		4,592		
Conservative hold		Swing	+7.1	

Eccleshill
Party	Candidate	Votes	%	±%
Conservative	H. Lycett	1,560	46.3	+11.4
Labour	A. Maddocks	1,368	40.6	−9.5
Liberal Democrats	M. Attenborough	392	11.6	−3.3
Green	D. Stepan	48	1.4	+1.4
Majority		192	5.7	−9.5
Turnout		3,368		
Conservative gain from Labour		Swing	+10.4	

Great Horton
Party	Candidate	Votes	%	±%
Conservative	M. Crabtree	1,718	45.5	+9.8
Labour	B. Lynch	1,639	43.4	−9.1
Liberal Democrats	C. Wright	309	8.2	−0.5
Green	M. Knott	106	2.8	−0.3
Majority		79	2.1	−14.7
Turnout		3,772		
Conservative gain from Labour		Swing	+9.4	

Heaton
Party	Candidate	Votes	%	±%
Conservative	J. King	2,681	47.3	+5.1
Conservative	G. Gidley	2,494		
Labour	T. Caswell	2,305	40.7	−7.0
Labour	M. Ali	2,133		
Liberal Democrats	J. Nash	408	7.2	−0.3
Green	P. Braham	271	4.8	+2.2
Majority		376	6.6	+1.1
Turnout		5,665		
Conservative hold		Swing		
Conservative gain from Labour		Swing	+6.0	

Idle
Party	Candidate	Votes	%	±%
Liberal Democrats	D. Ward	2,301	48.4	+4.5
Conservative	R. Priestley	1,592	33.5	+1.8
Labour	P. Lloyd	809	17.0	−7.4
Green	K. Warnes	55	1.2	+1.2
Majority		709	14.9	+2.7
Turnout		4,757		
Liberal Democrats hold		Swing	+1.3	

Ilkley
Party	Candidate	Votes	%	±%
Conservative	A. Hayes	3,306	68.8	+7.0
Labour	J. Liuba	806	16.8	−4.7
Liberal Democrats	S. Green	477	9.9	−6.8
Green	J. Wright	213	4.4	+4.4
Majority		2,500	52.1	+11.7
Turnout		4,802		
Conservative hold		Swing	+5.8	

Keighley North
Party	Candidate	Votes	%	±%
Conservative	K. Jepson	2,583	52.1	+11.8
Labour	S. Thomas	1,951	39.4	−6.9
Liberal Democrats	J. Brooksbank	278	5.6	−4.7
Green	J. Murgatroyd	141	2.8	−0.2
Majority		632	12.8	+6.8
Turnout		4,953		
Conservative hold		Swing	+9.3	

Keighley South
Party	Candidate	Votes	%	±%
Labour	T. Flanagan	2,332	68.3	+3.5
Conservative	D. Jepson	852	25.0	+4.3
Liberal Democrats	B. Salmons	140	4.1	−4.3
Green	M. Crowson	90	2.6	−0.0
Majority		1,480	43.4	−0.7
Turnout		3,414		
Labour hold		Swing	-0.4	

Keighley West
Party	Candidate	Votes	%	±%
Labour	A. Mudd	1,979	44.2	−8.1
Conservative	M. Startin	1,958	43.8	+9.9
Liberal Democrats	A. Carter	305	6.8	−3.4
Green	G. Lambert	231	5.2	+1.5
Majority		21	0.5	−18.0
Turnout		4,473		
Labour hold		Swing	-9.0	

Little Horton
Party	Candidate	Votes	%	±%
Labour	M. Mir	1,621	58.6	−5.8
Conservative	G. Johnson	628	22.7	+6.0
Liberal Democrats	A. Griffiths	450	16.3	−2.5
Green	M. Shabbeer	66	2.4	+2.4
Majority		993	35.9	−9.7
Turnout		2,765		
Labour hold		Swing	-5.9	

Odsal
Party	Candidate	Votes	%	±%
Conservative	J. Robertshaw	2,080	48.5	+18.0
Labour	S. Mitchell	1,764	41.1	−9.8
Liberal Democrats	K. Hall	365	8.5	−10.0
Green	K. Crook	79	1.8	+1.8
Majority		316	7.4	−13.0
Turnout		4,288		
Conservative hold		Swing	+13.9	

Queensbury
Party	Candidate	Votes	%	±%
Conservative	E. Sunderland	2,055	46.1	+5.7
Labour	H. Mason	1,679	37.7	−9.6
Independent	R. Naylor	388	8.7	+8.7
Liberal Democrats	J. Saul	336	7.5	−4.8
Majority		376	8.4	+1.5
Turnout		4,458		
Conservative hold		Swing	+7.6	

Rombalds
Party	Candidate	Votes	%	±%
Conservative	D. Smith	3,555	67.0	+7.6
Labour	H. Gundry	942	17.7	−4.1
Liberal Democrats	V. Whelan	812	15.3	−3.5
Majority		2,613	49.2	+11.8
Turnout		5,309		
Conservative hold		Swing	+5.8	

Shipley East
Party	Candidate	Votes	%	±%
Labour	E. English	1,646	49.2	−7.4
Conservative	J. Carroll	1,243	37.2	+8.8
Liberal Democrats	J. Hall	453	13.5	−1.4
Majority		403	12.1	−16.1
Turnout		3,342		
Labour hold		Swing	-8.1	

Shipley West
Party	Candidate	Votes	%	±%
Conservative	B. Nunn	2,783	53.4	+9.6
Labour	G. Whitfield	1,790	34.3	−4.9
Liberal Democrats	T. Willis	403	7.7	−3.6
Green	D. Ford	237	4.5	−1.1
Majority		993	19.0	+14.4
Turnout		5,213		
Conservative hold		Swing	+7.2	

Thornton
Party	Candidate	Votes	%	±%
Conservative	M. Clayburn	2,144	57.2	+11.9
Labour	V. Hughes	1,277	34.1	−7.6
Liberal Democrats	H. Wright	230	6.1	−3.5
Green	A. Suchi	95	2.5	−0.9
Majority		867	23.1	+19.5
Turnout		3,746		
Conservative hold		Swing	+9.7	

Toller
Party	Candidate	Votes	%	±%
Labour	C. Rangzeb	2,111	50.7	−9.6
Conservative	S. Gilmartin	1,604	38.5	+10.4
Liberal Democrats	S. Devonshire	279	6.7	−1.0
Green	S. Harris	167	4.0	+0.2
Majority		507	12.2	−20.0
Turnout		4,161		
Labour hold		Swing	-10.0	

Tong
Party	Candidate	Votes	%	±%
Labour	J. Cairns	1,439	83.9	+18.3
Liberal Democrats	K. Robinson	147	8.6	−2.7
Green	N. Tart	130	7.6	7.6
Majority		1,292	75.3	+33.0
Turnout		1,716		
Labour hold		Swing	+10.5	

Undercliffe
Party	Candidate	Votes	%	±%
Labour	P. Foord	1,875	48.4	−8.1
Conservative	G. Moore	1,595	41.2	+13.7
Liberal Democrats	E. Hallmann	300	7.7	−5.2
Green	S. Burlet	102	2.6	−0.4
Majority		280	7.2	−21.8
Turnout		3,872		
Labour gain from Conservative		Swing	-10.9	

University
Party	Candidate	Votes	%	±%
Labour	M. Ajeeb	2,875	70.0	−0.9
Conservative	J. Austin	669	16.3	+2.0
Liberal Democrats	J. Chatfield	358	8.7	+0.9
Green	N. Taimuri-Shabbeer	204	5.0	−1.0
Majority		2,206	53.7	−2.9
Turnout		4,106		
Labour hold		Swing	-1.4	

Wibsey
Party	Candidate	Votes	%	±%
Conservative	R. Sheard	1,550	43.3	+7.0
Labour	L. Woodward	1,503	42.0	−4.4
Liberal Democrats	B. Boulton	465	13.0	−4.5
Green	R. Whibley	64	1.8	+1.8
Majority		47	1.3	−8.8
Turnout		3,582		
Conservative hold		Swing	+5.7	

Worth Valley
Party	Candidate	Votes	%	±%
Conservative	G. Hodgson	2,432	59.6	+11.8
Labour	R. Kelly	1,288	31.5	−2.3
Liberal Democrats	R. Quayle	228	5.6	−7.0
Green	A. Speller	135	3.3	−2.5
Majority		1,144	28.0	+14.1
Turnout		4,083		
Conservative hold		Swing	+7.0	

Wyke
Party	Candidate	Votes	%	±%
Conservative	V. Owen	1,564	47.0	+12.2
Labour	J. Ryan	1,485	44.7	−4.0
Liberal Democrats	B. Barlaba	275	8.3	−8.2
Majority		79	2.4	−11.4
Turnout		3,324		
Conservative gain from Labour		Swing	+8.1	
