= Wyke, Bradford =

Ward in the City of Bradford, West Yorkshire, England

Coordinates: 53.73693°N 1.77000°W

Wyke
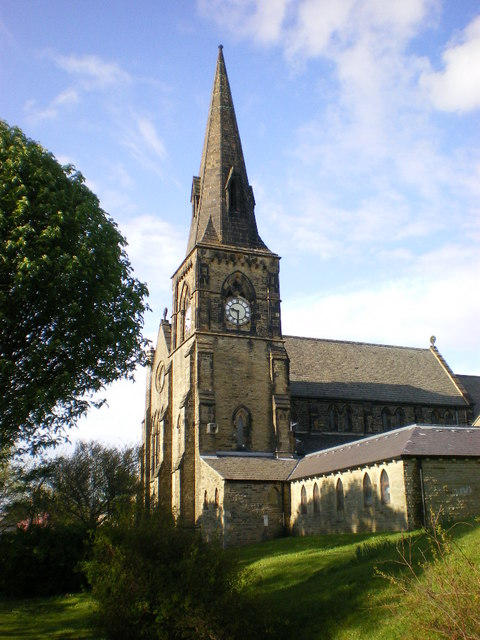
- St Mary's Church

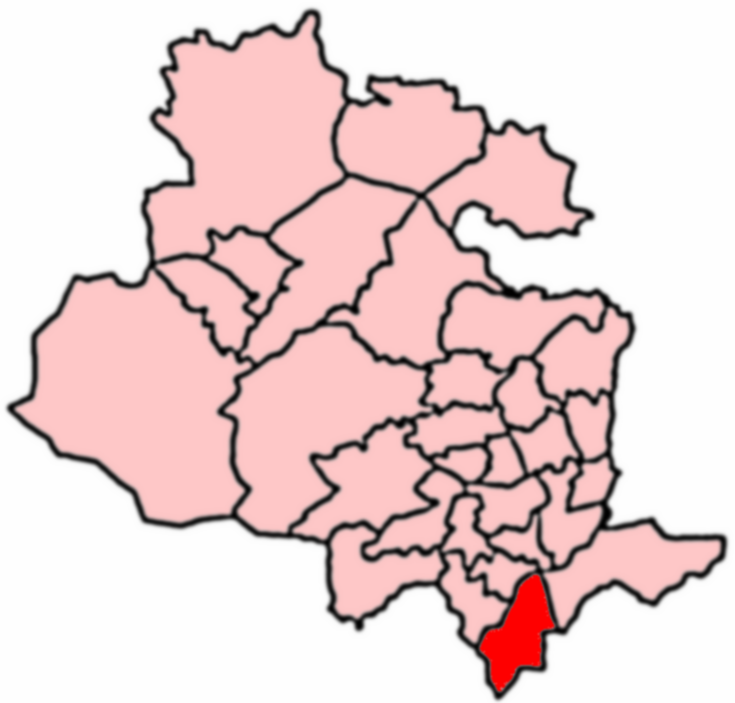
- 2004 Boundaries of Wyke

- Location within West Yorkshire
- Population: 14,950 (Ward. 2011 census)
- Metropolitan borough: City of Bradford
- Metropolitan county: West Yorkshire
- Region: Yorkshire and the Humber
- Country: England
- Sovereign state: United Kingdom
- Post town: BRADFORD
- Postcode district: BD6, BD12
- Dialling code: 01274
- Police: West Yorkshire
- Fire: West Yorkshire
- Ambulance: Yorkshire
- UK Parliament: Bradford South
- Councillors: Andy Walsh (Labour); Sarah Ferriby (Labour); Tom Hughes (Labour)

Wyke (population 14,180 – 2001 UK census) is an area of Bradford and a ward within the City of Bradford Metropolitan District Council in the county of West Yorkshire, England. The population taken at the 2011 Census was 14,958.

As well as the area of Wyke, the ward includes the adjoining hamlet of Lower Wyke, the area around Carr House, known as Carr House Gate, part of Oakenshaw (the main part of which is in Kirklees), and most of Low Moor. It is bordered on the east side by the M606 motorway and extends up to the Staygate roundabout on the north.

Wyke Methodist Church is located at Laverack Field in Wyke. The South Bradford Local History Alliance reports that "the Wesleyan movement held meetings in Wyke in the mid-19th century at a property in Wyke Lane known as Bink’s Cottage, and later at the home of Joseph Clark near the Temperance Hall. The original chapel was built in 1869 and was officially opened in 1871. A Sunday School was added in 1913."

== Councillors ==
Wyke is represented on Bradford Council by three Labour Party councillors, Andy Walsh, Sarah Ferriby, and Tom Hughes.

Election	Councillor	Councillor	Councillor
2004	David Warburton (Lab)	James Graham Lewthwaite (BNP)	Max Cummins (Lab)
2006	David Warburton (Lab)	James Lewthwaite (BNP)	Max Cummins (Lab)
2007	David Warburton (Lab)	Sarah Ferriby (Lab)	Max Cummins (Lab)
2008	David Warburton (Lab)	Sarah Ferriby (Lab)	David Robinson (Lab)
2010	David Warburton (Lab)	Sarah Ferriby (Lab)	David Robinson (Lab)
2011	David Warburton (Lab)	Sarah Ferriby (Lab)	David Robinson (Lab)
2012	David Warburton (Lab)	Sarah Ferriby (Lab)	David Robinson (Lab)
2014	David Warburton (Lab)	Sarah Ferriby (Lab)	David Robinson (Lab)
2015	David Warburton (Lab)	Sarah Ferriby (Lab)	David Robinson (Lab)
2016	David Warburton (Lab)	Sarah Ferriby (Lab)	Rosie Watson (Lab)
2018	David Warburton (Lab)	Sarah Ferriby (Lab)	Rosie Watson (Lab)
2019	David Warburton (Lab)	Sarah Ferriby (Lab)	Rosie Watson (Lab)
2021	David Warburton (Lab)	Sarah Ferriby (Lab)	Joan Clarke (Con)
2022	Andy Walsh (Lab)	Sarah Ferriby (Lab)	Joan Clarke (Con)
2023	Andy Walsh (Lab)	Sarah Ferriby (Lab)	Joan Clarke (Con)
2024	Andy Walsh (Lab)	Sarah Ferriby (Lab)	Tom Hughes (Lab)

indicates seat up for re-election.

== History ==
Wyke was formerly a township and chapelry in the parish of Birstall, in 1866 Wyke became a separate civil parish. In 1951 the parish had a population of 5809.

== Sport ==
Wyke Sports Village on Wilson Road was opened in September 2022 at a cost of £6m, and includes a 1.7km cycle track, a full-sized floodlit 3G football pitch, three grass pitches, and a pavilion equipped with community areas for up to 250 individuals and is home to Wyke Wanderers AFC who run various adult and junior teams with the mens first team competing in the West Yorkshire Football League.

== See also ==
- Listed buildings in Wyke
