= Wibsey =

Ward in the City of Bradford, West Yorkshire, England

Coordinates: 53°46′2″N 1°46′22″W

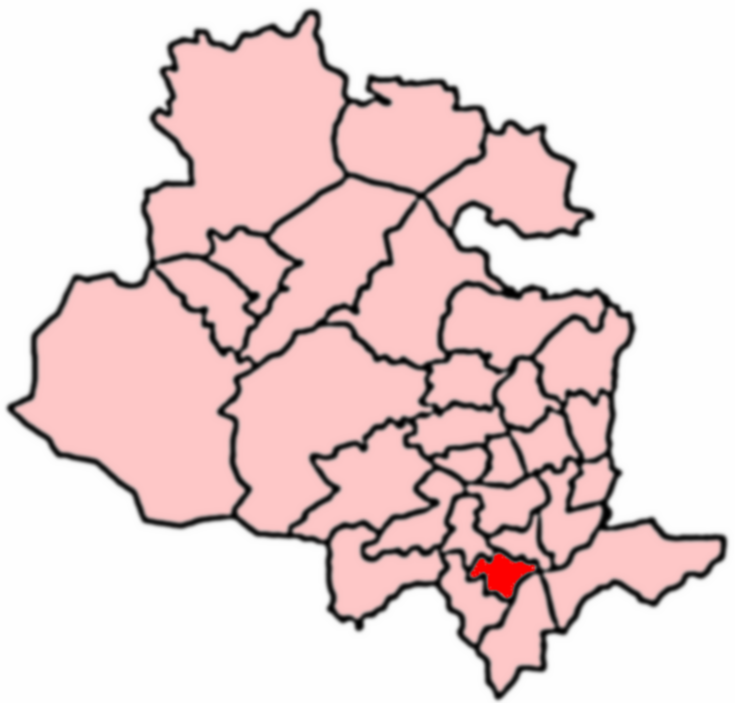
- 2004 Boundaries of Wibsey Ward
- Population: 14,671 (ward.2011)
- Region: Yorkshire and the Humber
- Country: England
- Sovereign state: United Kingdom
- UK Parliament: Bradford South
- Councillors: Sabiya Khan (Labour); Ralph Berry (Labour); David Green (Labour)

Wibsey (population 14,530 – 2001 UK census) is a ward within the City of Bradford Metropolitan District Council, West Yorkshire, England. The population had increased to 14,671 at the 2011 Census. Wibsey is named after Wibsey village, which makes up the main part of the ward. As well as the area of Wibsey, the ward includes the area of Bankfoot to the east and much of the area of Odsal. It is located on a ridge which runs from the city centre, up to Queensbury, which has been described as one of the highest villages in England.

== History ==
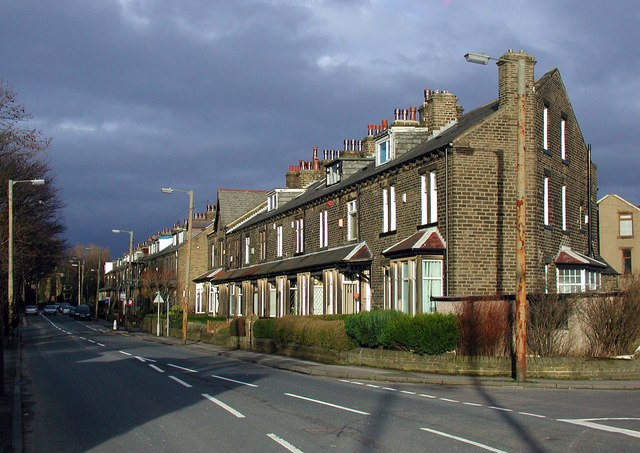
Wibsey Park Avenue, looking east-north-east

=== Toponymy ===
Wibsey means "Wibba's island", from the Old English personal name Wibba (possessive -s) + ēg (island, marsh). Local road-names, such as Harbour Road, support this meaning. An alternative derivation is that wib is a corruption of Old English with, meaning witheys or willows. Wibsey would thus be "willow island". The terrace of houses in Wibsey called Palm Close, where palm refers to willows rather than the more exotic palm tree, would seem to support this theory. Yet another theory has Wibsey as "land or hill of Wigbeort [personal name]".

=== Early history ===
Under the Danelaw Wibsey was in the wapentake of Morley. It became an independent manor under the Normans when it was granted to the de Lacy family. The whole area had been laid waste during the Harrying of the North and it was up to fifty years before it recovered.

Eventually the manor passed to the Danby family of Farnley, Leeds and was then purchased by the Rookes family of Royds Hall, near Huddersfield and subsumed into a wider estate that also included North Bierley.

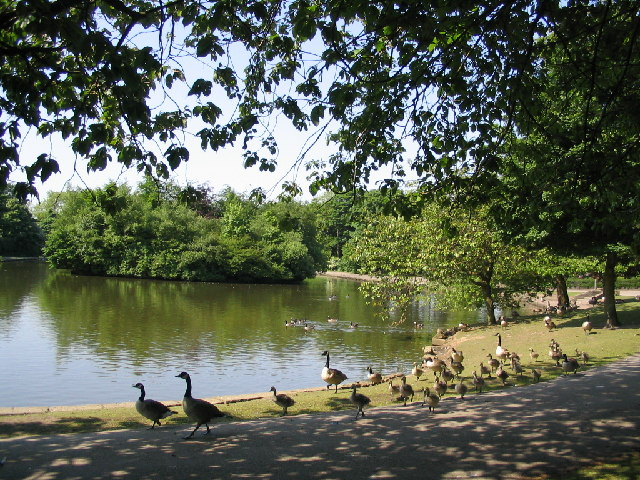
Wibsey Park Lake

By the 19th century, the main development in Wibsey was centred on Holroyd Hill. Elsewhere, small farm cottages (some of which survive today) were the main residences. They formed a ring around Wibsey Slack, an area of marshland, coal mines and slag heaps, whose existence is remembered today in local place names like Slackside and Slack Bottom Road. In fact, Wibsey remained an isolated, rural community until very late in its existence. It was not incorporated into Bradford until 1899. As a result, the medieval system of strip farming was a feature of Wibsey's landscape until well into the 19th century, much longer than elsewhere in England. Wibsey's antiquity is still visible today, with certain houses dating back to the early 17th century.

=== 20th century ===
The Inclosure (Wibsey Slack and Low Moor Commons) Provisional Order Confirmation Act 1881 laid the way for the development of modern Wibsey. Wibsey Park, North Bierley Cemetery and Harold Park are all direct results of this act. Further development occurred in the 1920s and 1930s. Odsal council estate dates from this period, as does the area around St. Paul's Avenue.

== Governance ==
Councillors

Wibsey and Odsal ward is represented on Bradford Council by three Reform UK councillors, Steve Burd, Darren Ingham, and Jason Townend.

Election	Councillor	Councillor	Councillor
2004	Arthur Collins Redfearn (BNP)	Ralph David Ritchie Berry (Lab)	David Michael Adam Green (Lab)
2006	Lynne Eleanor Smith (Lab)	Ralph Berry (Lab)	David Green (Lab)
2007	Lynne Smith (Lab)	Ralph Berry (Lab)	David Green (Lab)
2008	Lynne Smith (Lab)	Ralph Berry (Lab)	David Green (Lab)
2010	Lynne Smith (Lab)	Ralph Berry (Lab)	David Green (Lab)
2011	Lynne Smith (Lab)	Ralph Berry (Lab)	David Green (Lab)
2012	Lynne Smith (Lab)	Ralph Berry (Lab)	David Green (Lab)
2014	Lynne Smith (Lab)	Ralph Berry (Lab)	David Green (Lab)
2015	Lynne Smith (Lab)	Ralph Berry (Lab)	David Green (Lab)
2016	Lynne Smith (Lab)	Ralph Berry (Lab)	David Green (Lab)
By-election; 14 July 2016	Joanne Lisa Sharp (Lab)	Ralph Berry (Lab)	David Green (Lab)
2018	Sabiya Khan (Lab)	Ralph Berry (Lab)	David Green (Lab)
2019	Sabiya Khan (Lab)	Ralph Berry (Lab)	David Green (Lab)
2021	Sabiya Khan (Lab)	Ralph Berry (Lab)	David Green (Lab)
2022	Sabiya Khan (Lab)	Ralph Berry (Lab)	David Green (Lab)
2023	Sabiya Khan (Lab)	Ralph Berry (Lab)	David Green (Lab)
2024	Sabiya Khan (Lab)	Ralph Berry (Lab)	Faiz Ilyas (Lab)
2026	Steve Burd (Ref)	Darren Peter Ingham (Ref)	Jason Mark Townend (Ref)

indicates seat up for re-election. indicates a by-election.

== Facilities and events ==
Wibsey was an important market village and hosts its own horse fair every year on 5 October. Fair Road has a funfair site, which has been established for many generations.

The origins of Wibsey Fair are uncertain. Some believe the monks of Kirkstall Abbey began the fair in the 12th or 13th century to provide an income, although the first documentary evidence comes with a reference in a dispute between former Lords, William Rookes and John de Lacy, to the "Revey Cross, sett up and standing at Revey Nabbe" where a fair was held. This would place the fairground near the modern-day Buttershaw estate, where roads entitled "Reevy" exist today. By the mid 19th century the fairground was at or near its present site, hence the local road name Fair Road.

Wibsey is also notable for the number of pubs in a small village. The Wibsey Working Men's Club (founded 1905) featured on the BBC's White series, in a film examining the decline of the working men's club, and British working class society in general.

Wibsey Library is open six days per week and often holds weekly events that support the community.

== Notable residents ==
- Samuel Bottomley, actor
- Jean-Jacques Burnel, musician
- Susan Fassbender, musician
- Chris Fountain, actor
- Mason Greenwood, footballer for Olympique de Marseille
- Masambula, professional wrestler
- Yvonne McGregor, cyclist
- John Orwin, former England Rugby Union captain
- Frank Whitcombe, former Bradford Bulls and Great Britain rugby player

== See also ==
- Listed buildings in Bradford (Wibsey Ward)

== Bibliography ==
- Carpenter, Stella H. (1992). The Manor of Wibsey: The Town & District. Bradford: Bradford Libraries. ISBN 9780907734284.
- Goodall, Armitage (1913). Place-names of South-west Yorkshire. Cambridge University Press. pp. 134–5, 299.
- Wibsey Miscellany No.5. Bradford: Wibsey Local History Group. 2010.
