= 2024 City of Bradford Metropolitan District Council election =

2024 local election in Bradford, England

2024 City of Bradford District Borough Council election
- 2 May 2024

30 out of 90 seats to City of Bradford Metropolitan District Council 46 seats needed for a majority

	First party	Second party	Third party
Leader	Susan Hinchcliffe	(Note: The nine independents before the election included two groups: the Bradford Independent Group (four councillors), led by Talat Sajawal, and the Bradford South Independents (two councillors) led by Luke Majkowski. The other three independents did not belong to a group.)	Rebecca Poulsen
Party	Labour	Independent	Conservative
Last election	56 seats, 40.9%	5 seats, 7.3%	16 seats, 30.3%
Seats before	53	9	15
Seats won	10	9	4
Seats after	49	13	13
Seat change	▼4	▲4	▼2
Popular vote	41,657	26,771	25,244
Percentage	32.8%	21.1%	19.9%
Swing	▼8.1%	▲13.8%	▼10.4%
	Fourth party	Fifth party
Leader	Matt Edwards	Brendan Stubbs
Party	Green	Liberal Democrats
Last election	8 seats, 11.8%	5 seats, 8.1%
Seats before	8	5
Seats won	4	3
Seats after	10	5
Seat change	▲2	Steady
Popular vote	19,519	9,344
Percentage	15.4%	7.4%
Swing	▲3.6%	▼0.7%
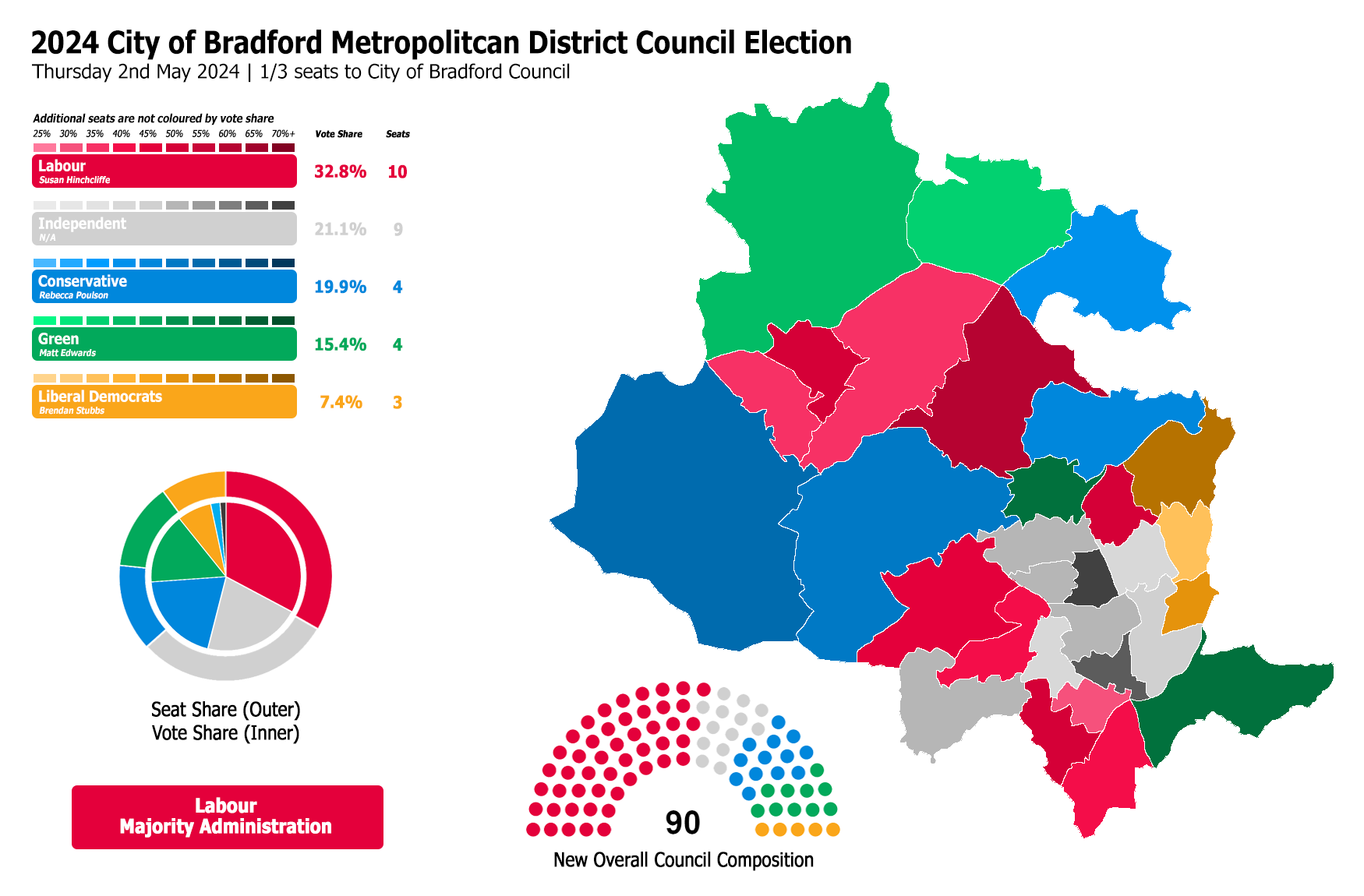
- Map of the results of the election by ward
Leader before election
Susan Hinchcliffe
Labour
Leader after election
Susan Hinchcliffe
Labour

The 2024 City of Bradford Metropolitan District Council election took place on 2 May 2024. One third of councillors (30 out of 90) were elected. The election took place alongside other local elections across England and Wales. Labour retained their majority on the council.

== Background ==
Result of the council election when these seats were last contested in 2021

Result of the most recent council election in 2023

Prior to the election the council had been under Labour majority control since the 2014 council election. Of the 30 seats contested in the previous election in 2023, Labour won 22 on 47.0% of the vote, the Conservatives won four seats on 24.0% of the vote, the Green Party won three seats on 14.5% of the vote, and the Liberal Democrats won one seat each on 8.5% of the vote.

Positions up for election in 2024 were last elected in 2021. In that election, fifteen Labour councillors, eleven Conservative councillors, three Liberal Democrat councillors, two Green councillors, and two independent councillors were elected.

== Electoral process ==
The council elects its councillors in thirds, with a third being up for election every year for three years, with no election in the fourth year. The election used first-past-the-post voting, with wards generally being represented by three councillors, with one elected in each election year to serve a four-year term.

All registered electors (British, Irish, Commonwealth and European Union citizens) living in Bradford aged 18 or over were entitled to vote in the election. People who live at two addresses in different councils, such as university students with different term-time and holiday addresses, are entitled to be registered for and vote in elections in both local authorities. Voting in-person at polling stations took place from 07:00 to 22:00 on election day, and voters were able to apply for postal votes or proxy votes in advance of the election.

== Council composition ==
After 2023 election		Before 2024 election		After 2024 election	
Party	Seats	Party	Seats	Party	Seats
Labour	56	Labour	53	Labour	49
Conservative	16	Conservative	15	Conservative	13
Independent	5	Independent	9	Independent	13
Green	8	Green	8	Green	10
Liberal Democrats	5	Liberal Democrats	5	Liberal Democrats	5

Changes 2023–2024:

- June 2023: Mohammed Nazam is suspended from the Conservative Party after apologising for attending a Pride event and calling it a "lapse in judgement" that "contradicts [his] personal religious beliefs."
- October 2023: Sarfraz Nazir and Taj Salam resign from the Labour Party over Keir Starmer's comments on the Gaza war and join the Bradford Independent Group.
- 13 March 2024: Julie Lintern is suspended from the Labour Party after voting against the administration's budget.

== Results summary ==
Labour made a net loss of four seats, but retained their majority on the council.

2024 City of Bradford Metropolitan District Council election
Party	This election			Full council			This election		
Party	Seats	Net	Seats %	Other	Total	Total %	Votes	Votes %	+/−
Labour	10	▼4	33.3	39	49	42.2	41,657	32.8	-8.1
Independent	9	▲4	13.3	4	13	14.4	26,771	21.1	+13.8
Conservative	4	▼2	13.3	9	13	10.0	25,244	19.9	-10.4
Green	4	▲2	13.3	6	10	11.1	19,519	15.4	+3.6
Liberal Democrats	3	Steady	10.0	2	5	5.6	9,344	7.4	-0.7
Yorkshire	0	Steady	0.0	0	0	0.0	2,509	2.0	+0.9
Reform	0	Steady	0.0	0	0	0.0	1,306	1.0	+0.9
British Democrats	0	Steady	0.0	0	0	0.0	190	0.1	0.0
UKIP	0	Steady	0.0	0	0	0.0	110	0.1	0.0
TUSC	0	Steady	0.0	0	0	0.0	103	0.1	0.0
SDP	0	Steady	0.0	0	0	0.0	58	<0.1	0.0

== Ward results ==
Incumbent councillors are marked with an asterisk.

=== Baildon ===
Baildon
Party	Candidate	Votes	%	±%
Conservative	Debbie Davies*	2,275	45.2	−16.4
Labour	Gill Dixon	1,922	38.2	+10.4
Independent	Joe Ashton	490	9.7	New
Green	Carl Dunk	229	4.5	−3.4
Liberal Democrats	David Wilkinson	117	2.3	−0.4
Majority		353	7.0	−26.8
Rejected ballots		21	0.4	
Turnout		5,033	42.2	−2.0
Registered electors		11,910		
Conservative hold		Swing		

=== Bingley ===
Bingley
Party	Candidate	Votes	%	±%
Labour	Marcus Dearden*	3,705	61.7	+13.8
Conservative	Paul Golding	1,690	28.1	−15.8
Green	Rachael Drucquer	398	6.6	+0.1
Liberal Democrats	Peter Russell	212	3.5	+1.8
Majority		2,015	33.6	+29.6
Rejected ballots		70	1.2	
Turnout		6,005	42.8	−6.7
Registered electors		14,007		
Labour hold		Swing		

=== Bingley Rural ===
Bingley Rural
Party	Candidate	Votes	%	±%
Conservative	Geoff Winnard	2,528	50.2	−5.5
Labour	Jenny Kimber	1,723	34.2	+13.6
Green	Brian Newham	548	10.9	+1.7
Liberal Democrats	Helen Baranowski	239	4.7	−2.1
Majority		805	16.0	−2.6
Rejected ballots		45	0.9	
Turnout		5,038	34.2	−7.2
Registered electors		14,703		
Conservative hold		Swing		

=== Bolton and Undercliffe ===
Bolton and Undercliffe
Party	Candidate	Votes	%	±%
Independent	David Ward	1,432	43.0	+8.7
Labour	Simon Cunningham*	1,169	35.1	−9.6
Conservative	Wendy Harrison	284	8.5	−7.3
Green	Bruce Gulland	227	6.8	+2.4
Yorkshire	Wendy Barras	182	5.5	New
TUSC	Tom Gibson	37	1.1	+0.3
Majority		263	7.9	−2.5
Rejected ballots		48	1.4	
Turnout		3,331	27.1	−3.9
Registered electors		12,258		
Independent gain from Labour		Swing		

=== Bowling and Barkerend ===
Bowling and Barkerend
Party	Candidate	Votes	%	±%
Independent	Ismail Uddin	1,551	46.6	New
Labour	Hassan Khan*	1,332	40.0	−4.2
Green	Andy Rickford	282	8.5	+4.0
Conservative	Ali Jamal	259	7.8	−35.0
Liberal Democrats	Howard Middleton	228	6.8	−1.7
Yorkshire	Kyle Wood	219	6.6	New
Majority		219	6.6	
Rejected ballots		34	1.0	
Turnout		3,871	27.6	−5.4
Registered electors		13,976		
Independent gain from Labour		Swing		

=== Bradford Moor ===
Bradford Moor
Party	Candidate	Votes	%	±%
Liberal Democrats	Riaz Ahmed*	2,052	52.6	+9.0
Labour	Margaret Alipoor	1,179	30.2	−9.6
Green	Andrew Wood	494	12.7	+10.5
Yorkshire	Darren Longhorn	110	2.8	New
Conservative	Tkay Shana	68	1.7	−12.7
Majority		873	22.4	18.6
Rejected ballots		46	1.2	
Turnout		3,903	29.2	−6.4
Registered electors		13,344		
Liberal Democrats hold		Swing		

=== City ===
City
Party	Candidate	Votes	%	±%
Independent	Rizwan Saleem	2,224	52.5	New
Labour Co-op	Aneela Ahmed*	1,448	34.2	−29.6
Green	Mateusz Tadych	300	7.1	−0.2
Conservative	Peter Kirk	267	6.3	−1.5
Majority		776	18.3	−24.4
Rejected ballots		30	0.7	
Turnout		4,239	27.2	−4.5
Registered electors		15,572		
Independent gain from Labour		Swing		

=== Clayton and Fairweather Green ===
Clayton and Fairweather Green
Party	Candidate	Votes	%	±%
Labour	Mozalfa Ilyas	1,369	40.9	−15.1
Conservative	Kate Lawton	720	21.5	−10.9
Independent	Sharat Hussain	661	19.8	New
Green	Susan Hassell	369	11.0	+2.8
Liberal Democrats	Steven Cotterill	225	6.7	+3.3
Majority		649	19.4	−4.2
Rejected ballots		39	1.2	
Turnout		3,344	27.6	−2.9
Registered electors		12,105		
Labour hold		Swing		

=== Craven ===
Craven
Party	Candidate	Votes	%	±%
Green	Neil Whitaker	2,455	41.3	+14.4
Conservative	George Buckley	2,288	38.5	+6.5
Labour	Andrew Knight	736	12.4	−5.2
Yorkshire	Peter Kaye	299	5.0	−1.8
UKIP	Leo Robinson	110	1.8	New
Liberal Democrats	Paul Mann	59	1.0	−0.4
Majority		167	2.8	−2.3
Rejected ballots		16	0.3	
Turnout		5,947	42.0	−2.8
Registered electors		14,155		
Green gain from Conservative		Swing		

=== Eccleshill ===
Eccleshill
Party	Candidate	Votes	%	±%
Liberal Democrats	Brendan Stubbs*	1,211	35.3	−0.6
Labour	Vera Martin	1,163	33.9	−0.4
Conservative	Ur Rasool	414	12.1	−2.2
Green	Sophie Vanicat	293	8.5	+3.3
Yorkshire	Jonathan Barras	288	8.4	−1.8
TUSC	Laura Fretwell	66	1.9	New
Majority		48	1.4	−0.2
Rejected ballots		24	0.7	
Turnout		3,435	25.9	−1.1
Registered electors		13,229		
Liberal Democrats hold		Swing		

=== Great Horton ===
Great Horton
Party	Candidate	Votes	%	±%
Independent	Sirferaz Saddiq	1,692	41.8	New
Labour Co-op	Abdul Jabar*	1,453	35.9	−33.5
Conservative	Sangeeta Khan	269	6.7	−10.1
Yorkshire	William Grant	248	6.1	New
Green	Steven Prosser	231	5.7	−2.2
Liberal Democrats	Sarah Moses	151	3.7	−2.2
Majority		239	5.9	−46.7
Rejected ballots		29	0.7	
Turnout		4,044	34.1	−1.4
Registered electors		11,837		
Independent gain from Labour		Swing		

=== Heaton ===
Heaton
Party	Candidate	Votes	%	±%
Independent	Ishtiaq Ahmed	2,183	51.1	New
Green	Khalid Mahmood	1,544	36.2	+24.4
Labour	Ibrar Hussain*	1,245	29.2	−43.6
Conservative	Stephen Butler	296	6.9	−5.7
Majority		639	15.0	−45.2
Rejected ballots		26	0.6	
Turnout		5,268	41.1	+7.0
Registered electors		12,809		
Independent gain from Labour		Swing		

=== Idle and Thackley ===
Idle and Thackley
Party	Candidate	Votes	%	±%
Liberal Democrats	Alun Owen Griffiths*	2,499	60.3	+10.6
Labour	Gareth Logan	881	21.3	+0.8
Yorkshire	Lara Barras	309	7.5	New
Conservative	Shihab-ud-deen Basit	243	5.9	−16.8
Green	Tess Lawrence	210	5.1	−2.0
Majority		1,618	39.1	+12.1
Rejected ballots		20	0.5	
Turnout		4,142	30.8	−3.6
Registered electors		13,406		
Liberal Democrats hold		Swing		

=== Ilkley ===
Ilkley
Party	Candidate	Votes	%	±%
Green	Ros Brown	2,414	37.7	+11.8
Conservative	Joanne Sugden	2,247	35.1	+7.7
Independent	Anne Hawkesworth*	988	15.4	−14.1
Labour	Michael Baldwin	694	10.8	−4.1
Liberal Democrats	John Briggs	58	0.9	−1.5
Majority		167	2.6	+0.5
Rejected ballots		41	0.6	
Turnout		6,401	53.7	−4.1
Registered electors		11,900		
Green gain from Independent		Swing		

=== Keighley Central ===
Keighley Central
Party	Candidate	Votes	%	±%
Labour	Mohsin Hussain*	2,902	51.5	+1.4
Independent	Vaz Shabir	1,889	33.5	New
Conservative	Clare Abberton	498	8.8	−6.8
Green	Peter Ferguson	234	4.2	+0.4
Liberal Democrats	Nick Allon	115	2.0	+0.4
Majority		1,013	18.0	+14.2
Rejected ballots		43	0.8	
Turnout		5,638	44.8	−11.1
Registered electors		12,571		
Labour hold		Swing		

=== Keighley East ===
Keighley East
Party	Candidate	Votes	%	±%
Labour	Fulzar Ahmed	1,561	37.6	−10.5
Conservative	Jenna Ambler	1,383	33.3	−7.2
Independent	Nasser Razak	491	11.8	New
Green	Duncan Hunnisett	362	8.7	+4.0
Liberal Democrats	Pauline Allon	296	7.1	+5.4
SDP	Alexander Richard Vann	58	1.4	+1.2
Majority		178	4.3	−3.7
Rejected ballots		35	0.6	
Turnout		4,151	33.1	−6.1
Registered electors		12,516		
Labour hold		Swing		

=== Keighley West ===
Keighley West
Party	Candidate	Votes	%	±%
Labour	Joe O'Keeffe	1,238	39.7	−0.6
Conservative	Julie Glentworth*	968	31.0	−9.5
Green	Adrian Farley	448	14.4	+11.3
Reform	Andrew Judson	297	9.5	New
Yorkshire	Dominic Atlas	113	3.6	−1.2
Liberal Democrats	David Hewitt	57	1.8	+0.1
Majority		270	8.7	+8.5
Rejected ballots		26	0.8	
Turnout		3,121	26.3	−5.7
Registered electors		11,832		
Labour gain from Conservative		Swing		

=== Little Horton ===
Little Horton
Party	Candidate	Votes	%	±%
Independent	Talat Sajawal*	2,755	68.5	+13.2
Labour	Andrew Mawson	769	19.1	−18.6
Green	Nurjahan Ali Arobi	220	5.5	+3.8
Conservative	Elizabeth Bell	150	3.7	−0.4
Yorkshire	Bob Buxton	129	3.2	New
Majority		1,986	49.4	+31.8
Rejected ballots		35	0.9	
Turnout		4,023	32.6	−9.3
Registered electors		13,322		
Independent hold		Swing		

=== Manningham ===
Manningham
Party	Candidate	Votes	%	±%
Independent	Muhammed Ali Islam	4,100	76.8	New
Labour	Adil Hussain	899	16.8	−60.7
Green	Anne Betts Fetherston	193	3.6	−2.2
Conservative	Harry Burns	144	2.7	−1.8
Majority		3,201	60.0	−6.0
Rejected ballots		29	0.5	
Turnout		5,336	42	+10.9
Registered electors		12,681		
Independent gain from Labour		Swing		

=== Queensbury ===
Queensbury
Party	Candidate	Votes	%	±%
Independent	Luke Majkowski*	2,130	53.6	New
Labour	Mobeen Hussain	919	23.1	−6.9
Conservative	Adam Paterson	574	14.4	−40.6
Green	Eithne Dodwell	279	7.0	−3.7
Liberal Democrats	Mary Whitrick	71	1.8	−8.9
Majority		1,211	30.5	+5.5
Rejected ballots		13	0.3	
Turnout		3,973	31.8	Steady
Registered electors		12,455		
Independent hold		Swing		

Luke Majkowski was elected in 2021 for the Conservatives.

=== Royds ===
Royds
Party	Candidate	Votes	%	±%
Labour	Andrew Thornton*	1,417	50.6	+1.2
Reform	Richard Hainsworth	478	17.1	New
Conservative	Ekoumba Bayap Emmanuel	391	14.0	−21.4
Green	Michael Daw	374	13.4	+7.6
Liberal Democrats	Ines Riach	140	5.0	+0.8
Majority		939	33.5	+19.5
Rejected ballots		30	1.1	
Turnout		2,800	22.9	
Registered electors		12,194		
Labour hold		Swing		

=== Shipley ===
Shipley
Party	Candidate	Votes	%	±%
Green	Martin Love*	3,251	63.6	+3.5
Labour	Jane Elgar	1,064	20.8	−1.4
Conservative	Qais Hussain	361	7.1	−5.3
Independent	Nagbea	206	4.0	New
Reform	Phill Moncaster	166	3.2	New
Liberal Democrats	Nicholas Errington	66	1.3	−0.6
Majority		2,187	42.8	+4.9
Rejected ballots		36	0.7	
Turnout		5,114	43.5	
Registered electors		11,742		
Green hold		Swing		

=== Thornton and Allerton ===
Thornton and Allerton
Party	Candidate	Votes	%	±%
Labour	Beverley Mullaney*	1,721	45.4	−10.1
Conservative	Robert George Goulding	761	20.1	−11.0
Independent	Qamar Ahmed	665	17.5	New
Liberal Democrats	Anthea Griffiths	342	9.0	+2.0
Green	Ismena Sorrell	304	8.0	+1.6
Majority		960	25.3	+0.9
Rejected ballots		47	1.2	
Turnout		3,793	29.6	−4.3
Registered electors		12,798		
Labour hold		Swing		

=== Toller ===
Toller
Party	Candidate	Votes	%	±%
Independent	Atira Malik	2,548	52.6	New
Labour	Arshad Hussain*	1,665	34.4	−53.0
Green	Brian Ford	453	9.4	−3.3
Conservative	Jonty Sharp	175	3.6	New
Majority		883	18.2	−56.5
Rejected ballots		38	0.8	
Turnout		4,841	36.4	
Registered electors		13,266		
Independent gain from Labour		Swing		

=== Tong ===
Tong
Party	Candidate	Votes	%	±%
Green	Matt Edwards*	1,620	60.6	+13.9
Labour	Sharon Ratcliffe	707	26.4	−8.8
Conservative	Gladys Akenji Lum	183	6.8	−9.2
Yorkshire	David Herdson	97	3.6	New
Liberal Democrats	Susan Elliott	68	2.5	New
Majority		913	34.1	+22.6
Rejected ballots		30	1.1	
Turnout		2,675	21.2	
Registered electors		12,601		
Green hold		Swing		

=== Wharfedale ===
Wharfedale
Party	Candidate	Votes	%	±%
Conservative	Bob Felstead*	1,913	41.1	−6.9
Labour	Bernard O'Connor	1,846	39.7	+18.0
Green	Chris Turner	418	9.0	−10.4
Liberal Democrats	Jamie Needle	328	7.0	−14.3
Yorkshire	Rachel Martins	148	3.2	New
Majority		67	1.4	
Rejected ballots		32	0.7	
Turnout		4,653	48.1	−5.2
Registered electors		9,661		
Conservative hold		Swing		

=== Wibsey ===
Wibsey
Party	Candidate	Votes	%	±%
Labour	Faiz Ilyas	913	31.6	−21.8
Independent	Nick Peterken	766	26.6	New
Green	Alexander Radice	435	15.1	+9.0
Yorkshire	Stacey Head	367	12.7	New
Conservative	Owais Rajput	296	10.3	−22.2
Liberal Democrats	Suzanne Lubenko	105	3.6	−4.4
Majority		147	5.1	−14.8
Rejected ballots		32	1.1	
Turnout		2,882	27.1	
Registered electors		10,633		
Labour hold		Swing		

=== Windhill and Wrose ===
Windhill and Wrose
Party	Candidate	Votes	%	±%
Labour	Alex Ross-Shaw*	1,551	51.6	+4.5
Conservative	James Gill	728	24.2	−14.5
Green	John Wood	388	12.9	+4.6
Liberal Democrats	Gillian Thorne	340	11.3	+5.5
Majority		823	27.4	+19.0
Rejected ballots		44	1.5	
Turnout		3,007	26.5	
Registered electors		11,323		
Labour hold		Swing		

=== Worth Valley ===
Worth Valley
Party	Candidate	Votes	%	±%
Conservative	Russell Brown*	2,327	56.4	−3.3
Labour	Ashwaan Joomun-Whitehead	1,309	31.7	+13.6
Green	Alyson Telfer	328	7.9	−2.8
Liberal Democrats	Kay Kirkham	165	4.0	+2.8
Majority		1,018	24.7	−16.9
Rejected ballots		48	12	
Turnout		4,129	37.7	
Registered electors		10,937		
Conservative hold		Swing		

=== Wyke ===
Wyke
Party	Candidate	Votes	%	±%
Labour	Tom Hughes	1,157	43.3	+4.2
Conservative	Malcolm McLean	544	20.3	−24.0
Reform	Ian Walker	365	13.6	+12.0
Green	Darren Parkinson	218	8.2	+2.9
Liberal Democrats	Kevin Anthony Hall	200	7.5	+4.0
British Democrats	James Graham Lewthwaite	190	7.1	+0.9
Majority		613	22.9	+17.7
Rejected ballots		25	0.9	
Turnout		2,674	24.8	
Registered electors		10,745		
Labour gain from Conservative		Swing		

== By-elections ==
=== Worth Valley ===
Worth Valley by-election: 12 February 2026
Party	Candidate	Votes	%	±%
Conservative	Paul Belcome Constantine Golding	1,815	51.7	▼4.7
Reform	Andrew Mark Judson	917	26.1	N/A
Labour	Peter James Kates	425	12.1	▼19.6
Green	Josie McMaster	245	7	▼0.9
Liberal Democrats	Kay Kirkham	83	2.4	▼1.6
Independent	Sabine Ebert-Forbes	29	0.8	N/A
Turnout		3,514	32.2	
Conservative hold		Swing		

The by-election was caused by the death of Conservative councillor Russell Brown on 2 November 2025.
