= 2022 City of Bradford Metropolitan District Council election =

2022 local election in Bradford

2022 Bradford Council election
- 5 May 2022

30 of 90 seats on City of Bradford Metropolitan District Council 46 seats needed for a majority

	First party	Second party	Third party
Leader	Susan Hinchcliffe	Rebecca Poulsen	Martin Love
Party	Labour	Conservative	Green
Last election	51, 40.9%	25, 30.3%	3, 11.8%
Seats won	52	21	6
Seat change	▲1	▼4	▲3
Percentage	43%	25%	14%
Swing	▲2.1%	▼5.3%	▲2.2%
	Fourth party	Fifth party
Leader	Jeanette Sunderland
Party	Liberal Democrats	Independent
Last election	7, 8.1%	4, 7.3%
Seats won	6	5
Seat change	▼1	▲1
Percentage	8%	7%
Swing	▼0.1%	▼0.3%
- Results map by ward
Council control before election
Labour
Subsequent council control
Labour

The 2022 City of Bradford Metropolitan District Council election took place on 5 May 2022 to elect one third of councillors to the City of Bradford Metropolitan District Council. The election took place at the same time as other local elections across the United Kingdom.

In the previous council election in 2021, Labour maintained its control of the council, holding 51 seats after the election. The Conservatives formed the main opposition with twenty-five seats, with the remaining seats held by the Liberal Democrats, Green Party and independent councillors. Labour held the council, increasing its majority by one.

== Background ==
Result of the council election when these seats were last contested in 2018

Result of the most recent council election in 2021

The Local Government Act 1972 created a two-tier system of metropolitan counties and districts covering Greater Manchester, Merseyside, South Yorkshire, Tyne and Wear, the West Midlands, and West Yorkshire starting in 1974. Bradford was a district of the West Yorkshire metropolitan county. The Local Government Act 1985 abolished the metropolitan counties, with metropolitan districts taking on most of their powers as metropolitan boroughs. The West Yorkshire Combined Authority was established in 2014 and began electing the mayor of West Yorkshire in 2021.

Since its formation, Bradford has been variously under Labour control, Conservative control and no overall control. Councillors have predominantly been elected from the Labour Party, Conservative Party and the Liberal Democrats. The Green Party gained their first councillors on Bradford Council in 2002 and following these elections became the joint third largest group on the council.

Labour regained control of the council from no overall control in the 2014 council election, gaining one seat to hold 46 out of 90 seats on the council. The Labour Party maintained its majority on the council in subsequent elections. In the most recent election in 2021, Labour won fifteen seats on 40.9% of the vote, the Conservatives won eleven seats on 30.3% of the vote, the Liberal Democrats won three seats on 8.1% of the vote, and independents and the Green Party won two seats each on 7.3% and 11.8% of the vote respectively. Three Conservative councillors—Joan Clarke, Robert Hargreaves and Luke Majkowski—left their party to sit as independents in 2021 and 2022, citing internal issues in the local branch of the Conservative Party.

Positions up for election in 2022 were last elected in 2018. In that election, twenty Labour councillors, eight Conservative councillors and two Liberal Democrat councillors were elected.

== Electoral process ==
The council elects its councillors in thirds, with a third being up for election every year for three years, with no election in the fourth year. The election will take place by first-past-the-post voting, with wards generally being represented by three councillors, with one elected in each election year to serve a four-year term.

All registered electors (British, Irish, Commonwealth and European Union citizens) living in Bradford aged 18 or over will be entitled to vote in the election. People who live at two addresses in different councils, such as university students with different term-time and holiday addresses, are entitled to be registered for and vote in elections in both local authorities. Voting in-person at polling stations will take place from 07:00 to 22:00 on election day, and voters will be able to apply for postal votes or proxy votes in advance of the election.

== Previous council composition ==
After 2021 election		Before 2022 election	
Party	Seats	Party	Seats
Labour	51	Labour	51
Conservative	25	Conservative	22
Liberal Democrats	7	Liberal Democrats	7
Independent	4	Independent	7
Green	3	Green	3

Changes:

- 2021: Robert Hargreaves leaves Conservatives to sit as an independent
- January 2022: Luke Majkowski and Joan Clarke leave Conservatives to sit as independents

== Result summary ==
2022 City of Bradford Metropolitan District Council election
Party	This election			Full council			This election		
Party	Seats	Net	Seats %	Other	Total	Total %	Votes	Votes %	+/−
Labour	19	▼1	63.3	33	52	57.7	56,667	44.1	+3.2
Conservative	6	▼2	20.0	15	21	23.3	32,545	25.3	-5.0
Green	3	▲3	10.0	3	6	6.7	18,330	14.3	+2.5
Liberal Democrats	1	▼1	3.3	5	6	5.6	10,400	8.1	±0.0
Independent	1	▲1	3.3	4	5 (Note: Two are part of the 'Bradford Independent Group', two are part of 'The Bradford South Independents', and the remaining one is a part of the 'Ilkley Independent' group)	58.9	8,707	6.8	-0.5
Yorkshire	0	Steady	0.0	0	0	0.0	1,304	1.0	-0.1
British Democrats	0	Steady	0.0	0	0	0.0	214	0.2	+0.1
Heritage	0	Steady	0.0	0	0	0.0	60	<0.1	N/A
TUSC	0	Steady	0.0	0	0	0.0	59	<0.1	N/A
For Britain	0	Steady	0.0	0	0	0.0	41	<0.1	±0.0
Freedom Alliance	0	Steady	0.0	0	0	0.0	36	<0.1	±0.0
SDP	0	Steady	0.0	0	0	0.0	35	<0.1	±0.0

== Ward results ==
=== Baildon ===
Baildon
Party	Candidate	Votes	%	±%
Conservative	Allison Coates	2,232	46.6	▼10.4
Labour	Peter Ashton	1,832	38.2	▲10.3
Green	Carl Dunk	395	8.2	▲4.1
Liberal Democrats	David Wilkinson	335	7.0	▼2.2
Majority		400	8.4	▼20.7
Turnout		4,807		
Conservative hold		Swing		

=== Bingley ===
Bingley
Party	Candidate	Votes	%	±%
Labour	Joe Wheatley	3,120	49.2	▲8.3
Conservative	David Heseltine	2,603	41.1	▼5.3
Green	Rachael Drucquer	422	6.7	▲1.7
Liberal Democrats	Peter Russell	195	3.1	▼0.5
Majority		517	8.1	N/A
Turnout		6,365		
Labour gain from Conservative		Swing		

=== Bingley Rural ===
Bingley Rural
Party	Candidate	Votes	%	±%
Conservative	Falak Ahmed	2,100	39.9	▼15.6
Labour	Abdul Malik	1,353	25.7	▲2.4
Independent	Cath Bacon	999	19.0	New
Green	Brian Newham	531	10.1	▲3.8
Liberal Democrats	Helen Baranowski	281	5.3	▼4.7
Majority		747	14.2	▼18.1
Turnout		5,278		
Conservative hold		Swing		

=== Bolton & Undercliffe ===
Bolton & Undercliffe
Party	Candidate	Votes	%	±%
Labour	Julie Humphreys	1,408	43.8	▼0.7
Liberal Democrats	Jafrul Gazi	1,221	38.0	▼4.1
Yorkshire	Wendy Barras	335	10.4	New
Green	Bruce Gulland	194	6.0	▲3.0
TUSC	Tom Gibson	59	1.8	▲1.0
Majority		187	5.8	▲3.4
Turnout		3,242		
Labour hold		Swing		

=== Bowling & Barkerend ===
Bowling & Barkerend
Party	Candidate	Votes	%	±%
Labour	Rizwana Jamil	1,947	44.4	▼33.1
Conservative	Mohammed Jamil	1,864	42.5	▲35.0
Green	Andy Rickford	225	5.1	▲2.6
Liberal Democrats	Suzanne Lubenko	211	4.8	▼4.8
Independent	Tahir Farooq	140	3.2	New
Majority		83	1.9	▼65.9
Turnout		4,396		
Labour hold		Swing		

=== Bradford Moor ===
Bradford Moor
Party	Candidate	Votes	%	±%
Labour	Mohammed Shafiq	2,479	53.9	▲0.1
Liberal Democrats	Mohammed Thair	1,871	40.7	▲22.0
Green	Sophie Vanicat	133	2.9	▲1.6
Conservative	Khalid Anjum	117	2.5	▲0.3
Majority		608	13.2	▼17.0
Turnout		4,615		
Labour hold		Swing		

=== City ===
City
Party	Candidate	Votes	%	±%
Labour	Mohammed Azam	2,598	81.7	▼5.9
Green	Hawarun Hussain	583	18.3	▲11.5
Majority		2,015	63.4	▼17.5
Turnout		3,208		
Labour hold		Swing		

=== Clayton & Fairweather Green ===
Clayton & Fairweather Green
Party	Candidate	Votes	%	±%
Labour	Sinead Engel	1,897	54.9	▼7.1
Conservative	Shamas Khan	1,045	30.3	▲2.4
Green	Susan May	305	8.8	▲2.8
Liberal Democrats	Steven Cotterill	206	6.0	▲2.0
Majority		852	24.6	▼9.4
Turnout		3,469		
Labour hold		Swing		

=== Craven ===
Craven
Party	Candidate	Votes	%	±%
Green	Caroline Whitaker	2,713	44.1	▲36.6
Conservative	Rebecca Whitaker	2,488	40.4	▼14.7
Labour	Umar Ghafoor	545	8.9	▼23.4
Yorkshire	Peter Kaye	226	3.7	New
Liberal Democrats	Paul Mann	120	2.0	▼2.9
Heritage	Andrew Ross	60	1.0	New
Majority		225	3.7	N/A
Turnout		6,161		
Green gain from Conservative		Swing		

=== Eccleshill ===
Eccleshill
Party	Candidate	Votes	%	±%
Labour	Christopher Hayden	1,470	44.2	▲7.1
Liberal Democrats	Agnieska Jedrzejewska	1,332	40.1	▼4.2
Yorkshire	Jonathan Barras	309	9.3	▲5.5
Green	Caroline Duvier	145	4.4	▲2.0
Independent	Matthew Jenkinson	69	2.1	New
Majority		138	4.1	N/A
Turnout		3,344		
Labour gain from Liberal Democrats		Swing		

=== Great Horton ===
Great Horton
Party	Candidate	Votes	%	±%
Labour	Joanne Dodds	2,512	76.6	▼6.9
Conservative	Amena Patel	423	12.9	▲2.1
Green	Lesley Hall	199	6.1	▲2.8
Liberal Democrats	Sarah Moses	147	4.5	▲2.2
Majority		2,089	63.7	▼9.0
Turnout		3,283		
Labour hold		Swing		

=== Heaton ===
Heaton
Party	Candidate	Votes	%	±%
Labour	Nussrat Mohammed	2,088	46.3	▼27.8
Green	Khalid Mahmood	1,914	42.5	▲30.4
Conservative	Sharon Robertshaw	346	7.7	▼1.3
Liberal Democrats	Peter McCarthy	160	3.5	▼0.7
Majority		174	3.8	▼58.2
Turnout		4,524		
Labour hold		Swing		

=== Idle & Thackley ===
Idle & Thackley
Party	Candidate	Votes	%	±%
Liberal Democrats	Aislin Naylor	2,323	53.5	▼2.7
Labour	Andrea Stephenson	989	22.8	▼3.4
Conservative	Adam Paterson	700	16.1	▲5.6
Green	Tess Lawrence	183	4.2	▲1.6
Yorkshire	Lara Barras	147	3.4	▼0.9
Majority		1,334	30.7	▲0.8
Turnout		4,351		
Liberal Democrats hold		Swing		

=== Ilkley ===
Ilkley
Party	Candidate	Votes	%	±%
Conservative	Andrew Loy	2,220	35.0	▼14.9
Green	Ros Brown	2,123	33.5	▲21.7
Labour	George Scaife	1,239	19.5	▼7.8
Independent	Mike Gibbons	520	8.2	New
Liberal Democrats	Caroline Jones	236	3.7	▼7.0
Majority		97	1.5	▼21.1
Turnout		6,358		
Conservative hold		Swing		

=== Keighley Central ===
Keighley Central
Party	Candidate	Votes	%	±%
Conservative	Mohammed Nazam	3,117	48.5	▲33.1
Labour	Amjad Zaman	2,864	44.6	▼31.4
Green	Alyson Telfer	163	2.5	▼1.4
Liberal Democrats	Nick Allon	152	2.4	▼1.6
Yorkshire	Bob Buxton	127	2.0	New
Majority		253	3.9	N/A
Turnout		6,451		
Conservative gain from Labour		Swing		

=== Keighley East ===
Keighley East
Party	Candidate	Votes	%	±%
Labour	Caroline Firth	2,554	57.8	▲2.6
Conservative	Martyn Wood	1,296	29.3	▼5.3
Green	Swami Anahata	266	6.0	▼0.5
Liberal Democrats	Kay Kirkham	160	3.6	▲0.1
Independent	Wendy Harrison	135	3.1	New
SDP	Alexander Vann	10	0.2	New
Majority		1,258	28.5	▲7.8
Turnout		4,438		
Labour hold		Swing		

=== Keighley West ===
Keighley West
Party	Candidate	Votes	%	±%
Labour	Paul Godwin	1,509	43.9	▼4.4
Conservative	Peter Corkindale	1,257	36.6	▲2.8
Independent	Laura Kelly	356	10.4	New
Yorkshire	Dom Atlas	118	3.4	New
Green	James Whitaker	99	2.9	▼0.2
Liberal Democrats	Steve Spoerry	54	1.6	▼0.6
For Britain	Leo Robinson	41	1.2	New
Majority		252	7.3	▼7.2
Turnout		3,441		
Labour hold		Swing		

=== Little Horton ===
Little Horton
Party	Candidate	Votes	%	±%
Independent	Noor Elahi	2,544	52.6	New
Labour	Fareeda Mir	1,943	40.2	▼44.4
Liberal Democrats	James Hunt	144	3.0	▼2.5
Conservative	Sangeeta Kauser	125	2.6	▼4.4
Green	Nurjahan Ali Arobi	80	1.7	▼0.7
Majority		601	12.4	N/A
Turnout		4,858		
Independent gain from Labour		Swing		

=== Manningham ===
Manningham
Party	Candidate	Votes	%	±%
Labour	Shabir Hussain	2,396	55.1	▼28.1
Independent	Muhammed Islam	1,621	37.3	New
Green	Bruce Barnes	198	4.6	▼1.2
Conservative	John Robertshaw	134	3.1	▼5.5
Majority		775	17.8	▼56.8
Turnout		4,375		
Labour hold		Swing		

=== Queensbury ===
Queensbury
Party	Candidate	Votes	%	±%
Labour	Hazel Parsan	1,286	35.2	▲8.3
Independent	Robert Hargreaves	1,127	30.9	New
Conservative	Nick Peterken	980	26.8	▼11.9
Green	Eithne Dodwell	157	4.3	▲1.1
Liberal Democrats	Mary Whitrick	66	1.8	▼1.6
Freedom Alliance	Linda Salsbury	36	1.0	New
Majority		159	4.3	N/A
Turnout		3,665		
Labour gain from Conservative		Swing		

=== Royds ===
Royds
Party	Candidate	Votes	%	±%
Labour	Ruth Wood	1,683	56.4	▲9.5
Conservative	Paul Turpin	890	29.8	▲6.0
Liberal Democrats	Shauna Devonshire	208	7.0	▲3.2
Green	Ian Sharp	202	6.8	▲3.5
Majority		793	26.6	▲3.4
Turnout		3,002		
Labour hold		Swing		

=== Shipley ===
Shipley
Party	Candidate	Votes	%	±%
Green	Anna Watson	3,405	64.6	▲30.5
Labour	Mohammed Bashir	1,121	21.3	▼25.8
Conservative	Sharon Jandu	423	8.0	▼7.3
Yorkshire	Darren Longhorn	160	3.0	New
Liberal Democrats	Nicholas Errington	92	1.7	▼1.5
Independent	Stephen Place	41	0.8	New
SDP	John Wood	25	0.5	New
Majority		2,284	43.3	N/A
Turnout		5,284		
Green gain from Labour		Swing		

=== Thornton & Allerton ===
Thornton & Allerton
Party	Candidate	Votes	%	±%
Labour	Karen Regan	2,309	60.2	▲1.8
Conservative	Jac Morton	967	25.2	▼6.7
Liberal Democrats	Anthea Pickard	307	8.0	▲5.6
Green	John Whitaker	252	6.6	▲3.7
Majority		1,342	35.0	▲8.5
Turnout		3,854		
Labour hold		Swing		

=== Toller ===
Toller
Party	Candidate	Votes	%	±%
Labour	Kamran Hussain	3,686	80.7	▲7.7
Independent	Amir Hussain	363	7.9	New
Green	Sean Dobiech	242	5.3	▲2.6
Conservative	Shirley Rayner	214	4.7	▼17.4
Liberal Democrats	Tariq Mahmood	63	1.4	▼0.5
Majority		3,323	72.8	▲21.9
Turnout		4,610		
Labour hold		Swing		

=== Tong ===
Tong
Party	Candidate	Votes	%	±%
Green	Celia Hickson	1,534	51.7	▲37.0
Labour	Tom Hughes	1,088	36.6	▼14.6
Conservative	Harfan Khan	275	9.3	▼10.9
Liberal Democrats	Susan Elliott	72	2.4	▼1.1
Majority		446	15.1	N/A
Turnout		2,977		
Green gain from Labour		Swing		

=== Wharfedale ===
Wharfedale
Party	Candidate	Votes	%	±%
Conservative	Gerry Barker	1,855	39.5	▼12.1
Labour	Christopher Steele	1,447	30.8	▼0.5
Liberal Democrats	Jamie Needle	852	18.1	▲6.8
Green	Chris Turner	544	11.6	▲5.9
Majority		408	8.7	▼11.5
Turnout		4,716		
Conservative hold		Swing		

=== Wibsey ===
Wibsey
Party	Candidate	Votes	%	±%
Labour	Sabiya Khan	1,348	41.7	▼6.1
Independent	Gareth Gregory	792	24.5	New
Conservative	Kate Lawton	640	19.8	▼6.6
Liberal Democrats	Brian Boulton	279	8.6	▲2.6
Green	Grace Fetherston	173	5.4	▲2.3
Majority		556	17.2	▼4.2
Turnout		3,242		
Labour hold		Swing		

=== Windhill & Wrose ===
Windhill & Wrose
Party	Candidate	Votes	%	±%
Labour	Liz Rowe	1,836	55.2	▼4.1
Conservative	Peter Cochrane	922	27.7	0.0
Green	Helen Love	321	9.7	▲3.6
Liberal Democrats	Gillian Thorne	247	7.4	▲0.9
Majority		914	27.5	▼4.1
Turnout		3,342		
Labour hold		Swing		

=== Worth Valley ===
Worth Valley
Party	Candidate	Votes	%	±%
Conservative	Christopher Herd	2,329	54.1	▼2.1
Labour	Ashwaan Joomun-Whitehead	1,328	30.8	▼5.0
Green	Janet Russell	439	10.2	▲5.5
Liberal Democrats	Bob Jones	211	4.9	▲1.9
Majority		1,001	23.3	▲2.9
Turnout		4,326		
Conservative hold		Swing		

=== Wyke ===
Wyke
Party	Candidate	Votes	%	±%
Labour	Andy Walsh	1,458	48.1	▼1.0
Conservative	Richard Milczanowski	983	32.4	▲1.9
British Democrats	James Lewthwaite	214	7.1	▲1.6
Green	Darren Parkinson	190	6.3	▲3.8
Liberal Democrats	Kevin Hall	189	6.2	▲2.7
Majority		475	15.7	▼3.0
Turnout		3,044		
Labour hold		Swing		
