= 2023 City of Bradford Metropolitan District Council election =

- 4 May 2023

30 of 90 seats on City of Bradford Metropolitan District Council 46 seats needed for a majority

	First party	Second party
Leader	Susan Hinchcliffe	Rebecca Poulsen
Party	Labour	Conservative
Last election	18, 46.0%	9, 24.5%
Seats before	52	20
Seats won	22	4
Seats after	56	16
Seat change	▲4	▼5
Popular vote	56,916	29,093
Percentage	47.0%	24.0%
Swing	▲1.0%	▼0.5%
	Third party	Fourth party
Leader	Matt Edwards	Brendan Stubbs
Party	Green	Liberal Democrats
Last election	1, 12.8%	2, 10.6%
Seats before	6	6
Seats won	3	1
Seats after	8	5
Seat change	▲2	▼1
Popular vote	17,607	10,353
Percentage	14.5%	8.5%
Swing	▲1.7%	▼2.1%
- The winner of each seat by party in the 2023 City of Bradford Metropolitan District Council election
Leader before election
Susan Hinchcliffe
Labour
Leader after election
Susan Hinchcliffe
Labour

The 2023 City of Bradford Metropolitan District Council election took place on 4 May 2023 to elect members of City of Bradford Metropolitan District Council in West Yorkshire, England. This was on the same day as other local elections across England. Labour retained its majority on the council.

== Background ==
The Local Government Act 1972 created a two-tier system of metropolitan counties and districts covering Greater Manchester, Merseyside, South Yorkshire, Tyne and Wear, the West Midlands, and West Yorkshire starting in 1974. Bradford was a district of the West Yorkshire metropolitan county. The Local Government Act 1985 abolished the metropolitan counties, with metropolitan districts taking on most of their powers as metropolitan boroughs. The West Yorkshire Combined Authority was established in 2014 and began electing the mayor of West Yorkshire in 2021.

Since its formation, Bradford has been variously under Labour control, Conservative control and no overall control. Councillors have predominantly been elected from the Labour Party, Conservative Party and the Liberal Democrats. The Green Party gained their first councillors on Bradford Council in 2002 and following these elections became the joint third largest group on the council.

Labour had regained control of the council from no overall control in the 2014 council election, gaining one seat to hold 46 out of 90 seats on the council. The Labour Party maintained its majority on the council in subsequent elections. Of the 30 seats contested in the previous election in 2022, Labour won nineteen on 44.1% of the vote, the Conservatives won six seats on 25.3% of the vote, the Green Party won three seats on 14.3% of the vote, and the Liberal Democrats and independents won one seat each on 8.1% and 6.8% of the vote respectively.

Positions up for election in 2023 were last elected in 2019. In that election, eighteen Labour councillors, nine Conservative councillors, two Liberal Democrat councillors, and one Green councillor were elected. Labour retained control of the council at this election.

== Electoral process ==
The council elects its councillors in thirds, with a third being up for election every year for three years, with no election in the fourth year. The election will take place by first-past-the-post voting, with wards generally being represented by three councillors, with one elected in each election year to serve a four-year term.

All registered electors (British, Irish, Commonwealth and European Union citizens) living in Bradford aged 18 or over will be entitled to vote in the election. People who live at two addresses in different councils, such as university students with different term-time and holiday addresses, are entitled to be registered for and vote in elections in both local authorities. Voting in-person at polling stations will take place from 07:00 to 22:00 on election day, and voters will be able to apply for postal votes or proxy votes in advance of the election.

== Previous council composition ==
After 2022 election		Before 2023 election	
Party	Seats	Party	Seats
Labour	52	Labour	52
Conservative	21	Conservative	20
Green	6	Green	6
Liberal Democrats	6	Liberal Democrats	6
Independent	5	Independent	6

== Results summary ==
2023 City of Bradford Metropolitan District Council election
Party	This election			Full council			This election		
Party	Seats	Net	Seats %	Other	Total	Total %	Votes	Votes %	+/−
Labour	22	▲4	73.3	34	56	62.2	56,916	47.0	▲1.0
Conservative	4	▼5	13.3	12	16	17.8	29,093	24.0	▼0.5
Green	3	▲2	10.0	5	8	8.9	17,607	14.5	▲1.7
Liberal Democrats	1	▼1	0.33	4	5	5.6	10,353	8.5	▼2.1
Independent	0	Steady	0.0	5	5	5.6	5,073	4.2	▲3.8
Yorkshire	0	Steady	0.0	0	0	0.0	1,408	1.2	▲0.8
Reform	0	Steady	0.0	0	0	0.0	443	0.3	New
British Democrats	0	Steady	0.0	0	0	0.0	140	0.1	▼0.5
SDP	0	Steady	0.0	0	0	0.0	37	0.0	New
TUSC	0	Steady	0.0	0	0	0.0	35	0.0	New

== Ward results ==
Asterisks denote incumbent councillors seeking re-election.

=== Baildon ===
Baildon (1)
Party	Candidate	Votes	%	±%
Conservative	Mike Pollard*	2,153	44.5	▼2.0
Labour	Peter Ashton	2,003	41.4	▲15.7
Green	Carl Dunk	244	5.0	▼2.2
Liberal Democrats	David Wilkinson	231	4.8	▼5.6
Reform	Phil Moncaster	211	4.4	New
Majority		150	3.1	▼18.0
Rejected ballots		13		
Turnout		4,842		
Conservative hold		Swing		

=== Bingley ===
Bingley (1)
Party	Candidate	Votes	%	±%
Labour	Susan Fricker	2,796	46.9	▲10.1
Conservative	Geoff Winnard*	2,365	39.7	▼0.1
Green	Rachael Drucquer	558	9.4	▼1.1
Liberal Democrats	Peter Russell	239	4.0	▼1.6
Majority		431	7.2	▲4.2
Rejected ballots		24		
Turnout		5,958		
Labour gain from Conservative		Swing		

=== Bingley Rural ===
Bingley Rural (1)
Party	Candidate	Votes	%	±%
Conservative	Paul Sullivan*	2,457	46.8	▼9.0
Labour	Abdul Malik	1,211	23.0	▲3.2
Independent	Cath Bacon	960	18.3	New
Green	Brian Newham	432	8.2	▼8.3
Liberal Democrats	Helen Baranowski	194	3.7	▼4.2
Majority		1,246	23.8	▼12.2
Rejected ballots		13		
Turnout		5,254		
Conservative hold		Swing		

=== Bolton and Undercliffe ===
Bolton and Undercliffe (1)
Party	Candidate	Votes	%	±%
Labour	Suhail Choudhry*	2,064	60.0	▲15.1
Liberal Democrats	Suzanne Lubenko	620	18.0	▼17.0
Conservative	Sukhchain Singh	296	8.6	▼1.9
Green	Bruce Gulland	168	4.9	▼4.6
Yorkshire	Wendy Barras	165	4.8	New
Reform	Sid Bourn	97	2.8	New
TUSC	Tom Gibson	35	1.0	New
Majority		1,444	42.0	▲32.1
Rejected ballots		8		
Turnout		3,445		
Labour hold		Swing		

=== Bowling and Barkerend ===
Bowling and Barkerend (1)
Party	Candidate	Votes	%	±%
Labour	Imran Khan*	2,540	75.0	▲6.1
Liberal Democrats	Howard Middleton	285	8.4	▲3.0
Conservative	Muhammad Wasim Ul Fazal	242	7.1	▼7.5
Green	Andy Rickford	176	5.2	▼5.8
Yorkshire	Kyle Wood	143	4.2	New
Majority		2,255	66.6	▲12.3
Rejected ballots		17		
Turnout		3,386		
Labour hold		Swing		

=== Bradford Moor ===
Bradford Moor (1)
Party	Candidate	Votes	%	±%
Labour	Zafar Iqbal*	2,607	56.0	▼26.0
Liberal Democrats	Mohammed Thair	1,727	37.1	▲30.9
Conservative	Asif Iqbal	192	4.1	▼4.0
Yorkshire	William Grant	68	1.5	New
Green	Andy Wood	63	1.4	▼2.2
Majority		880	18.9	▼55.0
Rejected ballots		34		
Turnout		4,657		
Labour hold		Swing		

=== City ===
City (1)
Party	Candidate	Votes	%	±%
Labour	Shakeela Lal*	2,513	79.1	▼3.3
Conservative	Amena Patel	348	11.0	▲5.8
Green	Mateusz Tadych	317	10.0	▲3.5
Majority		2,165	68.1	▼7.8
Rejected ballots		13		
Turnout		3,178		
Labour hold		Swing		

=== Clayton and Fairweather Green ===
Clayton and Fairweather Green (1)
Party	Candidate	Votes	%	±%
Labour	Carol Thirkill*	2,071	69.3	▲8.9
Conservative	Kate Lawton	574	19.2	▼4.8
Green	Susan May	228	7.6	▼2.7
Liberal Democrats	Steven Cotterill	115	3.8	▼0.6
Majority		1,497	50.1	▲13.7
Rejected ballots		16		
Turnout		2,988		
Labour hold		Swing		

=== Craven ===
Craven (1)
Party	Candidate	Votes	%	±%
Green	Janet Russell	2,831	49.5	▲30.4
Conservative	Eddie Irving	1,838	32.1	▲4.5
Labour	Andrew Knight	700	12.2	▼10.5
Yorkshire	Peter Kaye	280	4.9	▲1.1
Liberal Democrats	Paul Mann	73	1.3	▼3.0
Majority		993	17.4	▲12.5
Rejected ballots		8		
Turnout		5,722		
Green gain from Conservative		Swing		

=== Eccleshill ===
Eccleshill (1)
Party	Candidate	Votes	%	±%
Labour	Ian Parsons	1,447	43.1	▲10.5
Liberal Democrats	Susan Knox*	1,173	34.9	▼5.3
Conservative	Wajid Rasool	467	13.9	▲6.4
Yorkshire	Jonathan Barras	152	4.5	▲2.0
Green	Sophie Vanicat	121	3.6	▲0.3
Majority		274	8.2	▲0.6
Rejected ballots		20		
Turnout		3,360		
Labour gain from Liberal Democrats		Swing		

=== Great Horton ===
Great Horton (1)
Party	Candidate	Votes	%	±%
Labour	Tariq Hussain*	2,374	70.2	▼5.2
Conservative	Sangeeta Khan	350	10.4	▲0.5
Independent	Harry Boota	253	7.5	New
Liberal Democrats	Sarah Moses	157	4.6	▼1.7
Green	Alexander Sykes	136	4.0	▼4.5
Yorkshire	William Grant	110	3.3	New
Majority		2,204	59.8	▼5.7
Rejected ballots		11		
Turnout		3,380		
Labour hold		Swing		

=== Heaton ===
Heaton (1)
Party	Candidate	Votes	%	±%
Labour	Mohammed Amran*	2,821	58.4	▼16.6
Green	Khalid Mahmood	1,769	36.6	▲22.5
Conservative	Saika Khan	167	3.5	▼3.5
Liberal Democrats	Allah Ali	74	1.5	▼2.4
Majority		1,052	21.8	▼39.1
Rejected ballots		24		
Turnout		4,831		
Labour hold		Swing		

=== Idle and Thackley ===
Idle and Thackley (1)
Party	Candidate	Votes	%	±%
Liberal Democrats	Jeanette Sunderland*	2,686	63.7	▲1.7
Labour	Gareth Logan	805	19.1	▲5.3
Conservative	John Robertshaw	404	9.6	▲3.9
Yorkshire	Lara Barras	161	3.8	New
Green	Tess Lawrence	159	3.8	▼1.8
Majority		1,881	44.6	▼3.6
Rejected ballots		12		
Turnout		4,215		
Liberal Democrats hold		Swing		

=== Ilkley ===
Ilkley (1)
Party	Candidate	Votes	%	±%
Conservative	David Nunns	2,655	41.9	▲5.5
Green	Ros Brown	2,495	39.3	▲13.9
Labour	Michael Baldwin	977	15.4	▼4.4
Liberal Democrats	Caroline Jones	214	3.4	▼15.0
Majority		160	2.6	▼8.4
Rejected ballots		26		
Turnout		6,341		
Conservative hold		Swing		

=== Keighley Central ===
Keighley Central (1)
Party	Candidate	Votes	%	±%
Labour	Amjad Zaman	3,125	49.3	▲9.5
Conservative	Javaid Akhtar	2,284	36.0	▼13.8
Independent	Zafar Ali*	580	9.2	New
Green	Alyson Telfer	178	2.8	▼3.8
Independent	Leo Robinson	85	1.3	New
Liberal Democrats	Nicholas Allon	84	1.3	▼2.5
Majority		841	13.3	▲3.3
Rejected ballots		41		
Turnout		6,336		
Labour gain from Conservative		Swing		

=== Keighley East ===
Keighley East (1)
Party	Candidate	Votes	%	±%
Labour	Lisa Robinson	2,015	51.2	▼3.0
Conservative	Martin Crangle	1,425	36.2	▲10.6
Green	Duncan Hunnisett	270	6.9	▼9.1
Liberal Democrats	John Briggs	186	4.7	▼0.5
SDP	Alexander Vann	37	1.0	New
Majority		590	15.0	▼12.6
Rejected ballots		36		
Turnout		3,933		
Labour hold		Swing		

=== Keighley West ===
Keighley West (1)
Party	Candidate	Votes	%	±%
Labour	Julie Lintern*	1,507	47.3	▲0.2
Conservative	Laura Kelly	1,447	45.5	▲19.7
Liberal Democrats	Steven Spoerry	127	4.0	▼1.8
Green	James Whitaker	102	3.2	New
Majority		60	1.8	▼19.5
Rejected ballots		10		
Turnout		3,183		
Labour hold		Swing		

=== Little Horton ===
Little Horton (1)
Party	Candidate	Votes	%	±%
Labour	Taj Salam*	2,763	85.7	▼0.1
Yorkshire	Darren Longhorn	138	4.3	New
Conservative	Muhammad Afzal	127	3.9	▼0.8
Green	Nurjahan Ali Arobi	104	3.2	▼0.9
Liberal Democrats	Tariq Mahmood	91	2.8	▼2.6
Majority		2,625	81.4	▲1.0
Rejected ballots		23		
Turnout		3,223		
Labour hold		Swing		

=== Manningham ===
Manningham (1)
Party	Candidate	Votes	%	±%
Labour	Safina Kauer	2,502	50.9	▼38.0
Independent	Muhammed Islam	2,153	43.8	New
Green	Anne Fetherston	169	3.4	▼1.9
Conservative	Khalid Anjum	89	1.8	▼1.6
Majority		349	7.1	▼76.5
Rejected ballots		22		
Turnout		4,913		
Labour hold		Swing		

=== Queensbury ===
Queensbury (1)
Party	Candidate	Votes	%	±%
Labour	Alex Mitchell	1,206	35.3	▲8.1
Independent	Robert Hargreaves	1,042	30.5	New
Conservative	Adam Paterson	849	24.9	▼7.5
Green	Eithne Dodwell	229	6.7	▼3.9
Liberal Democrats	Mary Whitrick	86	2.5	▼5.8
Majority		164	4.8	▼0.4
Rejected ballots		10		
Turnout		3,412		
Labour gain from Conservative		Swing		

=== Royds ===
Royds (1)
Party	Candidate	Votes	%	±%
Labour	Angela Tait*	1,713	63.9	▲21.3
Conservative	Emmanuel Ekoumba Bayap	592	22.1	▲5.2
Green	Ian Sharp	251	9.4	▲2.3
Liberal Democrats	Ines Riach	124	4.6	▼1.8
Majority		1,121	41.8	▲26.2
Rejected ballots		13		
Turnout		2,680		
Labour hold		Swing		

=== Shipley ===
Shipley (1)
Party	Candidate	Votes	%	±%
Green	Kevin Warnes*	3,204	64.6	▲9.3
Labour	Vera Martin	1,238	24.9	▼7.1
Conservative	Paul Golding	423	8.5	▲0.5
Liberal Democrats	Nicholas Errington	98	2.0	▲0.1
Majority		1,966	39.7	▲16.4
Rejected ballots		33		
Turnout		4,963		
Green hold		Swing		

=== Thornton and Allerton ===
Thornton and Allerton (1)
Party	Candidate	Votes	%	±%
Labour	Sue Duffy*	2,224	61.8	▲5.5
Conservative	Jac Morton	743	20.7	▼6.5
Green	John Whitaker	322	9.0	▼2.2
Liberal Democrats	Anthea Griffiths	307	8.5	▲3.1
Majority		1,481	41.1	▲12.0
Rejected ballots		10		
Turnout		3,596		
Labour hold		Swing		

=== Toller ===
Toller (1)
Party	Candidate	Votes	%	±%
Labour	Folia Shaheen*	3,190	82.4	▼5.6
Green	Brian Ford	354	9.1	▲5.4
Conservative	Shaheen Iqbal	326	8.4	▲4.8
Majority		2,836	73.3	▼10.1
Rejected ballots		31		
Turnout		3,870		
Labour hold		Swing		

=== Tong ===
Tong (1)
Party	Candidate	Votes	%	±%
Green	Ursula Sutcliffe	1,546	59.8	▲29.6
Labour	Kausar Mukhtar*	650	25.2	▼5.1
Conservative	Paul Turpin	221	8.6	▼1.7
Liberal Democrats	Susan Elliott	92	3.6	▼1.3
Yorkshire	Baz Inman	75	2.9	New
Majority		896	34.6	▲34.5
Rejected ballots		10		
Turnout		2,584		
Green gain from Labour		Swing		

=== Wharfedale ===
Wharfedale (1)
Party	Candidate	Votes	%	±%
Labour	Christopher Steele	1,718	39.4	▲18.1
Conservative	Peter Cochrane	1,692	38.8	▼8.6
Green	Chris Turner	534	12.2	▼1.5
Liberal Democrats	Jamie Needle	420	9.6	▼8.0
Majority		26	0.8	▼25.3
Rejected ballots		15		
Turnout		4,364		
Labour gain from Conservative		Swing		

=== Wibsey ===
Wibsey (1)
Party	Candidate	Votes	%	±%
Labour Co-op	Ralph Berry*	1,470	55.9	▲10.2
Conservative	Nick Peterken	548	20.8	▲2.3
Liberal Democrats	Brian Boulton	375	14.3	▲7.9
Green	Michael Daw	120	4.6	▼0.8
Yorkshire	Bob Buxton	116	4.4	New
Majority		922	35.1	▲10.2
Rejected ballots		10		
Turnout		2,629		
Labour hold		Swing		

=== Windhill and Wrose ===
Windhill and Wrose (1)
Party	Candidate	Votes	%	±%
Labour	Susan Hinchcliffe*	1,834	60.4	▲10.6
Conservative	Wendy Harrison	753	24.8	▲5.8
Liberal Democrats	Gillian Thorne	239	7.9	▲1.1
Green	John Wood	212	7.0	▼2.0
Majority		1,081	35.6	▲4.8
Rejected ballots		18		
Turnout		3,038		
Labour hold		Swing		

=== Worth Valley ===
Worth Valley (1)
Party	Candidate	Votes	%	±%
Conservative	Rebecca Poulsen*	2,412	59.2	▼2.1
Labour	Ash Joomun Whitehead	1,290	31.7	▲13.1
Green	Hawarun Hussain	187	4.6	▼9.5
Liberal Democrats	Kay Kirkham	182	4.5	▼1.6
Majority		1,122	27.5	▼15.2
Rejected ballots		17		
Turnout		4,071		
Conservative hold		Swing		

=== Wyke ===
Wyke (1)
Party	Candidate	Votes	%	±%
Labour	Sarah Ferriby*	1,542	56.0	▲10.4
Conservative	Malcolm McLean	654	23.8	▲5.2
Liberal Democrats	Kevin Hall	154	5.6	▲0.1
British Democrats	James Lewthwaite	140	5.1	▼19.4
Reform	Ian Walker	135	4.9	New
Green	Darren Parkinson	128	4.6	▼1.3
Majority		888	32.2	▲11.1
Rejected ballots		14		
Turnout		2,753		
Labour hold		Swing		
