= 2021 City of Bradford Metropolitan District Council election =

2021 UK local government election

Map showing the results of the 2021 City of Bradford Metropolitan District Council election

The 2021 City of Bradford Metropolitan District Council election took place on 6 May 2021 to elect members of City of Bradford Metropolitan District Council in England. This was on the same day as other local elections. One-third of seats were up for election, with three wards (Bingley Rural, Keighley Central, and Wharfedale) electing two councillors.

== Results ==
2021 City of Bradford Metropolitan District Council election
Party	This election			Full council			This election		
Party	Seats	Net	Seats %	Other	Total	Total %	Votes	Votes %	+/−
Labour	15	▼1	45.5	36	51	56.7	60,676	40.9	-5.1
Conservative	11	▲4	33.3	14	25	27.8	44,965	30.3	+5.8
Liberal Democrats	3	▼1	9.1	4	7	7.8	12,006	8.1	-2.5
Independent	2	▼3	6.1	2	4	4.4	10,758	7.3	+6.9
Green	2	▲1	6.1	1	3	3.3	17,504	11.8	-1.0
Yorkshire	0	Steady	0.0	0	0	0.0	1,614	1.1	+0.7
British Democrats	0	Steady	0.0	0	0	0.0	213	0.1	-0.5
Reform UK	0	Steady	0.0	0	0	0.0	161	0.1	New
UKIP	0	Steady	0.0	0	0	0.0	102	0.1	-4.5
Freedom Alliance	0	Steady	0.0	0	0	0.0	69	<0.1	New
SDP	0	Steady	0.0	0	0	0.0	59	<0.1	New
TUSC	0	Steady	0.0	0	0	0.0	57	<0.1	New
For Britain	0	Steady	0.0	0	0	0.0	55	<0.1	New

== Ward results ==
=== Baildon ===
Baildon
Party	Candidate	Votes	%	±%
Conservative	Debbie Davies	3,320	61.56	▲14.03
Labour	Peter Ashton	1,500	27.81	▲6.39
Green	Carl Dunk	425	7.88	▲3.89
Liberal Democrats	Nicholas Errington	148	2.74	▼16.04
Majority		1,820	33.75	▲7.64
Turnout		5,393	44.2	▲5.2
Conservative hold		Swing		

=== Bingley ===
Bingley
Party	Candidate	Votes	%	±%
Labour	Marcus Dearden	3,388	47.9	+20.4
Conservative	John Pennington	3,103	43.9	−0.8
Green	Rachael Drucquer	460	6.5	−2.2
Liberal Democrats	Nicholas Allon	123	1.7	−3.0
Rejected ballots		30	0.4	
Majority		285	4.03	N/A
Turnout		7,074	49.5	+5.5
Labour gain from Conservative		Swing		

=== Bingley Rural ===
Bingley Rural
Party	Candidate	Votes	%	±%
Conservative	Sally Birch	3,427	55.7	+18.1
Conservative	Naveed Riaz	2,417	39.3	+1.7
Labour	Brandon Henderson	1,268	20.6	−2.2
Labour	Abdul Malik	1,047	17.0	−5.8
Green	Brian Newham	563	9.2	+3.4
Green	Hawarun Hussain	421	6.8	+1.0
Liberal Democrats	Helen Baranowski	417	6.8	−2.7
Liberal Democrats	Kay Kirkham	393	6.4	−3.1
Independent	Robert Beckwith	300	4.9	New
Majority		1,149		
Turnout		6,171	41.4	
Conservative hold		Swing		
Conservative hold		Swing		

=== Bolton and Undercliffe ===
Bolton and Undercliffe
Party	Candidate	Votes	%	±%
Labour	Simon Cunningham	1,692	44.7	+14.3
Independent	David Ward	1,299	34.3	−17.9
Conservative	Jo Reynard	598	15.8	+11.3
Green	Grace Featherstone	165	4.4	+2.5
TUSC	Tom Gibson	29	0.8	New
Majority		393	10.4	N/A
Turnout		3783	31	−6
Labour gain from Liberal Democrats		Swing	+6.5	

=== Bowling and Barkerend ===
Bowling and Barkerend
Party	Candidate	Votes	%	±%
Labour	Hassan Khan	2,031	44.2	−23.2
Conservative	Mohammed Jamil	1,968	42.8	+35.7
Liberal Democrats	James Hunt	392	8.5	−8.1
Green	Basit Khalid	207	4.5	New
Majority		63	1.4	−49
Turnout		4598	33	−1
Labour hold		Swing	-29.5	

=== Bradford Moor ===
Bradford Moor
Party	Candidate	Votes	%	±%
Liberal Democrats	Riaz Ahmed	2,023	43.6	−5.9
Labour	Cath Bacon	1844	39.8	−8.8
Conservative	Sakhawat Hussain	668	14.4	+12.5
Green	Tessa Dunning	103	2.2	New
Majority		179	3.8	+2.8
Turnout		4638	35.6	−10.4
Liberal Democrats hold		Swing		

=== City ===
City
Party	Candidate	Votes	%	±%
Labour	Aneela Ahmed	2,544	63.8	7.3
Independent	Tahir Zeb	841	21.1	New
Conservative	Owais Rajput	309	7.8	−27.2
Green	Charlotte Woollard	293	7.3	+0.8
Majority		1703	42.7	+21.1
Turnout		3987	31.7	−4.3
Labour hold		Swing		

=== Clayton and Fairweather Green ===
Clayton and Fairweather Green
Party	Candidate	Votes	%	±%
Labour	Margaret Alipoor	2,069	56.0	+2.3
Conservative	John Robertshaw	1198	32.4	+13.3
Green	Susan May	301	8.2	+4.3
Liberal Democrats	Steven Cotterill	125	3.4	−0.9
Majority		871	23.6	−11.0
Turnout		3693	30.5	−4.1
Labour hold		Swing		

=== Craven ===
Craven
Party	Candidate	Votes	%	±%
Conservative	Peter Clarke	2,010	32.0	+3.8
Green	Caroline Whitaker	1691	26.9	+22.7
Labour	Val Carroll	1106	17.6	−8.5
Independent	Adrian Naylor	956	15.2	−22.4
Yorkshire	Peter Kaye	430	6.8	New
Liberal Democrats	Paul Mann	88	1.4	−2.5
Majority		319	5.1	N/A
Turnout		6281	44.8	+8.8
Conservative gain from Independent		Swing		

=== Eccleshill ===
Eccleshill
Party	Candidate	Votes	%	±%
Liberal Democrats	Brendan Stubbs	1,251	35.9	−8.5
Labour	Christopher Hayden	1195	34.3	+4.6
Conservative	Zubby Hussain	499	14.3	+6.9
Yorkshire	Jonathan Barras	357	10.2	New
Green	Caroline Duvier	182	5.2	+2.9
Majority		56	1.6	13.7
Turnout		3484	27.0	−6.0
Liberal Democrats hold		Swing		

=== Great Horton ===
Great Horton
Party	Candidate	Votes	%	±%
Labour	Abdul Jabar	2,833	69.4	−2.7
Conservative	Amjed Hussain	688	16.8	+9.2
Green	Lesley Hall	321	7.9	+4.6
Liberal Democrats	Sarah Moses	243	5.9	0.0
Majority		2145	52.6	−8.4
Turnout		4085	35.5	−3.5
Labour hold		Swing		

=== Heaton ===
Heaton
Party	Candidate	Votes	%	±%
Labour	Ibrar Hussain	3,038	72.8	+24.4
Conservative	Shirley Rayner	527	12.6	−21.3
Green	Celia Ruth Hickson	493	11.8	+9.8
Liberal Democrats	Peter James McCarthy	117	2.8	−12.9
Majority		2511	60.2	+45.7
Turnout		4175	34.1	−7.9
Labour hold		Swing		

=== Idle and Thackley ===
Idle and Thackley
Party	Candidate	Votes	%	±%
Liberal Democrats	Alun Griffiths	2,315	49.7	−10.6
Conservative	Geoffrey Whiteley	1056	22.7	+16.4
Labour	Andrea Stephenson	956	20.5	+5.1
Green	Tess Lawrence	333	7.1	+4.0
Majority		1259	27.0	−17.9
Turnout		4660	34.4	−0.6
Liberal Democrats hold		Swing		

=== Ilkley ===
Ilkley
Party	Candidate	Votes	%	±%
Independent	Anne Hawkesworth	2,084	29.5	−12.1
Conservative	David Nunns	1,933	27.4	+1.9
Green	Ros Brown	1,827	25.9	+20.2
Labour	George Scaife	1,053	14.9	−6.2
Liberal Democrats	Steve Spoerry	168	2.4	+0.5
Majority		151	2.1	−14.0
Turnout		7,065	57.8	+11.8
Independent hold		Swing		

=== Keighley Central ===
Keighley Central
Party	Candidate	Votes	%	±%
Labour	Mohsin Hussain	3,412	50.1	+21.2
Conservative	Mohammed Nazam	2,400	35.3	+23.9
Independent	Javaid Akhtar	2,143	31.5	New
Labour	Christine Chapman	2,096	30.8	+1.9
Conservative	Clare Abberton	1,063	15.6	+4.2
Green	James Whitaker	261	3.8	+1.3
Green	Alyson Telfer	198	2.9	+0.4
Liberal Democrats	Pauline Allon	111	1.6	−1.7
Liberal Democrats	Thomas Franks	82	1.2	−2.1
Majority		257		
Turnout		6,844	55.9	
Labour hold		Swing		
Conservative gain from Bradford Independent Group		Swing		

=== Keighley East ===
Keighley East
Party	Candidate	Votes	%	±%
Labour	Malcolm Slater	2,355	48.1	−9.0
Conservative	Stuart Currie	1963	40.1	+18.8
Green	Swami Anahata	230	4.7	+1.4
Yorkshire	Bob Buxton	230	4.7	New
Liberal Democrats	Bob Jones	85	1.7	−0.9
TUSC	Jake Shoulder	28	0.6	New
SDP	Alexander Vann	9	0.2	New
Majority		392	8.0	−27.9
Turnout		4900	39.2	−0.8
Labour hold		Swing		

=== Keighley West ===
Keighley West
Party	Candidate	Votes	%	±%
Conservative	Julie Glentworth	1,556	40.50	+20.2
Labour	Adrian Farley	1,550	40.34	−4.8
Yorkshire	Dom Bower	184	4.79	New
Independent	Jane Lee	160	4.16	New
Green	Brian Ford	119	3.10	+0.9
UKIP	Ian Bannister	102	2.65	−18.7
Liberal Democrats	Caroline Jones	66	1.72	−0.3
For Britain	Leo Robinson	55	1.43	New
SDP	Alexander Taylor	50	1.30	New
Majority		6	0.16	N/A
Turnout		3,842	32.0	−8.0
Conservative gain from Labour		Swing		

=== Little Horton ===
Little Horton
Party	Candidate	Votes	%	±%
Independent	Talat Sajawal	2,798	55.3	+0.8
Labour	Omar Hussain	1906	37.7	−0.9
Conservative	Emmanuel Ekoumba Bayap	209	4.1	+1.8
Green	Nurjahan Ali Arobi	86	1.7	0.0
Liberal Democrats	Abid Iqbal	61	1.2	−1.6
Majority		892	17.6	+1.7
Turnout		5060	41.9	−2.1
Independent hold		Swing		

=== Manningham ===
Manningham
Party	Candidate	Votes	%	±%
Labour	Sarfraz Nazir	2,959	77.5	+7.9
Liberal Democrats	Jafrul Gazi	466	12.2	−9.7
Green	Bruce Barnes	220	5.8	+1.6
Conservative	Toseef Tariq	171	4.5	+0.3
Majority		2493	66	+18.3
Turnout		3816	31.1	−12.9
Labour hold		Swing		

=== Queensbury ===
Queensbury
Party	Candidate	Votes	%	±%
Conservative	Luke Majkowski	2,217	55.0	+39.8
Labour	Alex Mitchell	1,208	30.0	+12.9
Green	Eithne Dodwell	430	10.7	+7.4
Reform UK	Richard Hainsworth	105	2.6	New
Liberal Democrats	Mary Whitrick	70	1.7	+0.4
Majority		1009	25.0	N/A
Turnout		4030	31.8	
Conservative gain from Independent		Swing		

=== Royds ===
Royds
Party	Candidate	Votes	%	±%
Labour	Andrew Thornton	1,641	49.4	+5.3
Conservative	Paul Turpin	1,174	35.4	+20.8
Green	Ian Sharp	191	5.8	New
Independent	Colin Duke	177	5.3	New
Liberal Democrats	Shauna Devonshire	138	4.2	−0.1
Majority		467	14.0	−20.5
Turnout		3,321		
Labour hold		Swing		

Trevor Walsh (Conservative) was previously nominated but withdrew.

=== Shipley ===
Shipley
Party	Candidate	Votes	%	±%
Green	Martin Love	3,405	60.1	+13.2
Labour	Mohammed Bashir	1,261	22.2	−11.0
Conservative	Christopher Clough	704	12.4	−4.4
Yorkshire	Darren Longhorn	191	3.4	New
Liberal Democrats	David Wilkinson	107	1.9	−1.3
Majority		2,144	37.9	+24.2
Turnout		5,668		
Green hold		Swing		

=== Thornton and Allerton ===
Thornton and Allerton
Party	Candidate	Votes	%	±%
Labour	Beverley Mullaney	2,409	55.5	+12.1
Conservative	Jac Morton	1,348	31.1	−5.2
Liberal Democrats	Anthea Pickard	305	7.0	+5.3
Green	Anna Watson	277	6.4	+1.8
Majority		1,061	24.4	+17.3
Turnout		4,339	33.9	−2.1
Labour hold		Swing	+8.7	

=== Toller ===
Toller
Party	Candidate	Votes	%	±%
Labour	Arshad Hussain	3,605	87.35	+23.5
Green	Sean Dobiech	522	12.65	+8.9
Majority		3,083	74.70	
Turnout		4,127		
Labour hold		Swing		

Waqas Hussain (Conservative) was previously nominated but withdrew.

=== Tong ===
Tong
Party	Candidate	Votes	%	±%
Green	Matt Edwards	1,586	46.7	New
Labour	Tom Hughes	1,196	35.2	−10.5
Conservative	Harry Boota	544	16.0	+1.1
Freedom Alliance	Ruth Blackwell	69	2.0	New
Majority		390	11.5	N/A
Turnout		3,395		
Green gain from Labour		Swing		

=== Wharfedale ===
Wharfedale
Party	Candidate	Votes	%	±%
Conservative	Bob Felstead	2,448	48.0	−6.5
Conservative	Dale Smith	2,148	42.1	−12.4
Labour	Christopher Steele	1,109	21.7	−1.3
Liberal Democrats	Jamie Needle	1,084	21.3	+8.8
Green	Chris Turner	991	19.4	+9.4
Labour	Phillip Shaw	838	16.4	−6.6
Green	Sophie Vanicat	398	7.8	−2.2
Liberal Democrats	Peter Russell	346	6.8	−5.7
Majority				
Turnout		5,124	53.3	
Conservative hold		Swing		
Conservative hold		Swing		

=== Wibsey ===
Wibsey
Party	Candidate	Votes	%	±%
Labour	David Green	1,728	53.4	+6.5
Conservative	Nicholas Peterken	1,051	32.5	+17.0
Liberal Democrats	Brian Boulton	259	8.0	+3.6
Green	David Stevens	199	6.1	+2.7
Majority		677	19.9	+10.5
Turnout		3,237		
Labour hold		Swing		

=== Windhill and Wrose ===
Windhill and Wrose
Party	Candidate	Votes	%	±%
Labour	Alex Ross-Shaw	1,695	47.1	−4.3
Conservative	Jordan Booth	1,393	38.7	+21.0
Green	Helen Love	300	8.3	+3.5
Liberal Democrats	Gillian Thorne	209	5.8	−2.2
Majority		302	8.4	−25.3
Turnout		3,597		
Labour hold		Swing		

=== Worth Valley ===
Worth Valley
Party	Candidate	Votes	%	±%
Conservative	Russell Brown	2,791	59.7	+18.5
Labour	Umar Ghafoor	845	18.1	−13.0
Green	Janet Russell	498	10.7	+3.0
Liberal Democrats	Paul Wilson	318	6.8	+3.5
Yorkshire	Joanna Kaye	222	4.7	New
Majority		1,946	41.6	+31.5
Turnout		4,674		
Conservative hold		Swing		

=== Wyke ===
Wyke
Party	Candidate	Votes	%	±%
Conservative	Joan Clarke	1,527	44.3	+30.3
Labour	Rosie Watson	1,349	39.1	+3.3
British Democrats	James Lewthwaite	213	6.2	+3.4
Green	Darren Parkinson	184	5.3	+3.1
Liberal Democrats	Kevin Hall	120	3.5	+0.8
Reform UK	Ian Walker	56	1.6	New
Majority		178	5.2	N/A
Turnout		3,449		
Conservative gain from Labour		Swing		
