= East Morton =

Village in West Yorkshire, England

Coordinates: 53.877071°N 1.848799°W

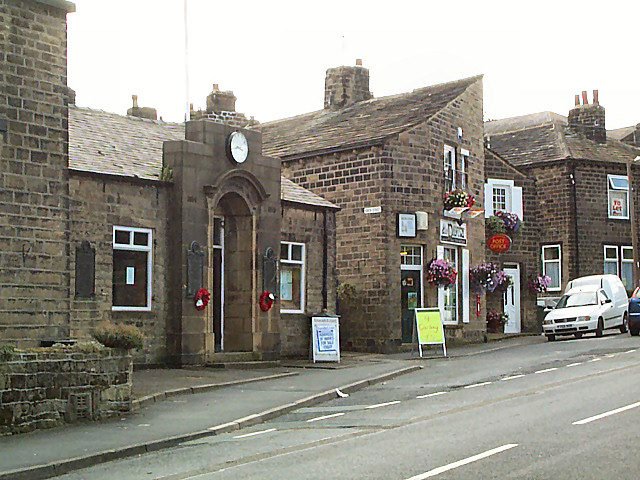
- East Morton Memorial Institute and Post Office

- Location within West Yorkshire
- Population: 1,169 (2011 census)
- OS grid reference: SE100423
- Civil parish: Keighley
- Metropolitan borough: City of Bradford
- Metropolitan county: West Yorkshire
- Region: Yorkshire and the Humber
- Country: England
- Sovereign state: United Kingdom
- Post town: KEIGHLEY
- Postcode district: BD20
- Dialling code: 01274
- Police: West Yorkshire
- Fire: West Yorkshire
- Ambulance: Yorkshire
- UK Parliament: Keighley and Ilkley

East Morton is a village in the civil parish of Keighley, in the Bradford district, in the county of West Yorkshire, England. It lies 2 miles (3 km) north of Bingley and 2.5 miles (4 km) east of Keighley. The small hamlet of West Morton lies 1 mile (1.6 km) to the north west. The village has a population of 1,169 according to the 2011 census.

== History ==
The place name Morton historically indicated a marsh or moor settlement. East and West Morton, together with Riddlesden and a large area of Rombalds Moor, formed the chapelry of Morton in the ancient parish of Bingley in the West Riding of Yorkshire. The chapelry became the parish of Morton by an act of Parliament in 1846, and in 1866 became a civil parish. The civil parish was abolished in 1938 and absorbed into the civil parish and municipal borough of Keighley, itself abolished in 1974 and absorbed into the City of Bradford Metropolitan District in the new county of West Yorkshire. The civil parish of Keighley, including East and West Morton, was reconstituted in 2002 with a town council.

== Geography ==
East Morton is situated on the northern side of the Airedale valley. The village is bounded to the north by Rombalds Moor, and to the east by woodland around Morton Beck, a tributary to the River Aire, some 1.5 miles (2.4 km) to the south.

== Landmarks ==
East Morton has a Public House called the Busfeild Arms named after the local Busfeild family who lived in the area in the 19th century, hence the apparent misspelling of the name. There is also a Church of England Primary School and St. Luke's church dating back to 1851, when it was consecrated for worship.

East Morton has grown substantially in recent years, with several new housing developments, including Waterside Fold which adjoins the Leeds and Liverpool Canal at the southern end of the village. The village also incorporates the Fardew golf course and a recreational playground.

== Transport ==
The village is approximately 1.5 miles (2.4 km) from Crossflatts railway station. Bus services K17 and K19 link the village with Keighley and Bingley Monday to Saturday, with financial assistance from West Yorkshire Metro. The A650 relief road provides a nearby road link to the rest of the Aire valley.

== See also ==
- Listed buildings in Keighley
