= Riddlesden =

Suburb in West Yorkshire, England

Coordinates: 53.880°N 1.883°W

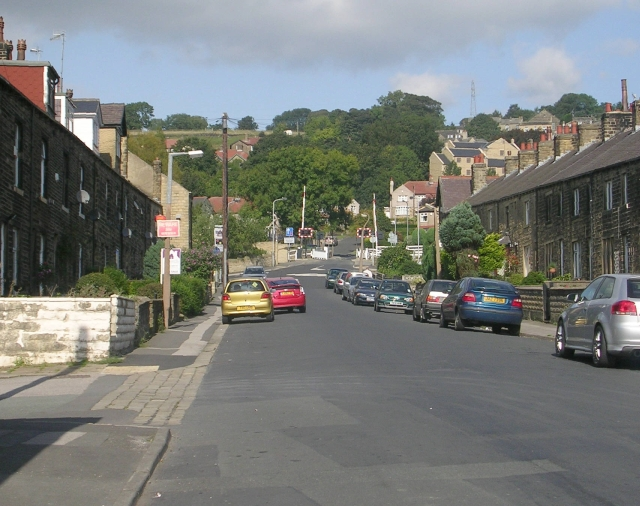
- Bar Lane in Riddlesden

- Location within West Yorkshire
- OS grid reference: SE080424
- Civil parish: Keighley
- Metropolitan borough: City of Bradford
- Metropolitan county: West Yorkshire
- Region: Yorkshire and the Humber
- Country: England
- Sovereign state: United Kingdom
- Post town: KEIGHLEY
- Postcode district: BD
- Dialling code: 01535
- Police: West Yorkshire
- Fire: West Yorkshire
- Ambulance: Yorkshire
- UK Parliament: Keighley and Ilkley

Riddlesden is a suburb of Keighley (historically a separate village) in the county of West Yorkshire, England and on the Leeds and Liverpool Canal.

The village lies 1.9 miles (3 km) east of Keighley town centre and is on the B6265 road between Keighley and Bingley. The part of the village by the canal is at a height of 360 feet (110 m) above sea level.

== History ==
Riddlesden is mentioned in the Domesday Book as belonging to William the Conqueror and being in the Wapentake of Skyrack. The name of the village appears throughout history as Redlesden and as Redelesden and it derives from the name of a wooded vale (or farm) of Rœd or Redwulf.

The village was historically in the parish of Bingley, but it is currently in the civil parish of Keighley. There have been proposals in 2010 and 2012 for Riddlesden to have a separate parish which includes nearby Stockbridge and Sandbeds. The ecclesiastical parish is known as Riddlesden St Mary, which is the name of the church in the village. The Diocese of Leeds estimates the ecclesiastical parish to have a population of 4,500. The village lies in the Ward of Keighley East for the purposes of census data.

In 1773, the Bingley to Skipton section of the Leeds and Liverpool Canal was opened. Riddlesden had several wharves which allowed for the exportation of coal from the nearby collieries. Coal was mined at Riddlesden between 1700 and the early 1920s.

The manor of Riddlesden, incorporating both houses (East and West Riddlesden Halls), was the breeding place of the Airedale Heifer, a legendary heavy cow similar in stature to the Craven Heifer. A pub called the Airedale Heifer is located in nearby Sandbeds, just to the east.

== Landmarks ==
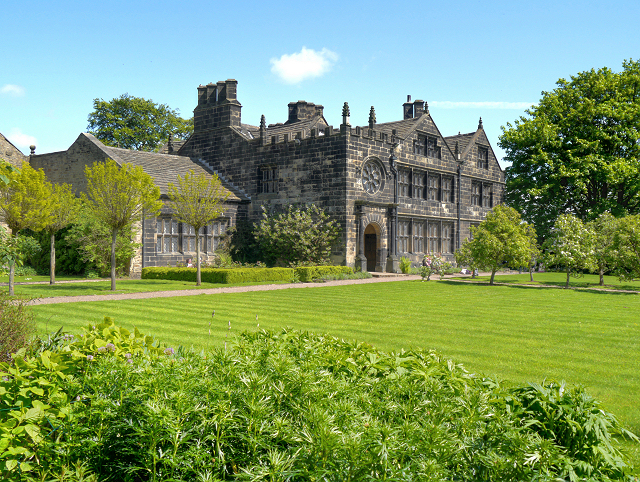
East Riddlesden Hall

East Riddlesden Hall is in the care of the National Trust. It was built in 1642 by a wealthy Halifax clothier, James Murgatroyd. There is a medieval tithebarn in the grounds.

East Riddlesden Hall was featured on an episode of the paranormal themed reality television programme Most Haunted.

A lot of walkers and campers and various clubs, e.g. Scouts, are attracted to the village because of its sights, such as the peculiarly shaped cliff known as "turtle rock" to locals.

== Amenities ==
The school for Riddlesden is St. Mary's Church of England Primary School and Nursery. The village has a large grocery shop and two pubs. Walks in the area are centred on the towpath of the canal, which is also designated as National Cycle Route 69.

Between 1927 and 2017, Riddlesden had a golf course to the west of the village overlooking the canal. The site closed due to dwindling numbers and has been converted into a scout activity centre. Just past the former golf course is Low Wood Nature Reserve, which is run by the Yorkshire Wildlife Trust.

== Notable people ==
- Denis Healey - Labour MP, later Baron Healey, of Riddlesden in the County of West Yorkshire, was brought up in the village from the age of eight.

== See also ==
- Listed buildings in Keighley
