= Dalton Mills =

Grade II* listed Victorian textile mill in Keighley, West Yorkshire, England

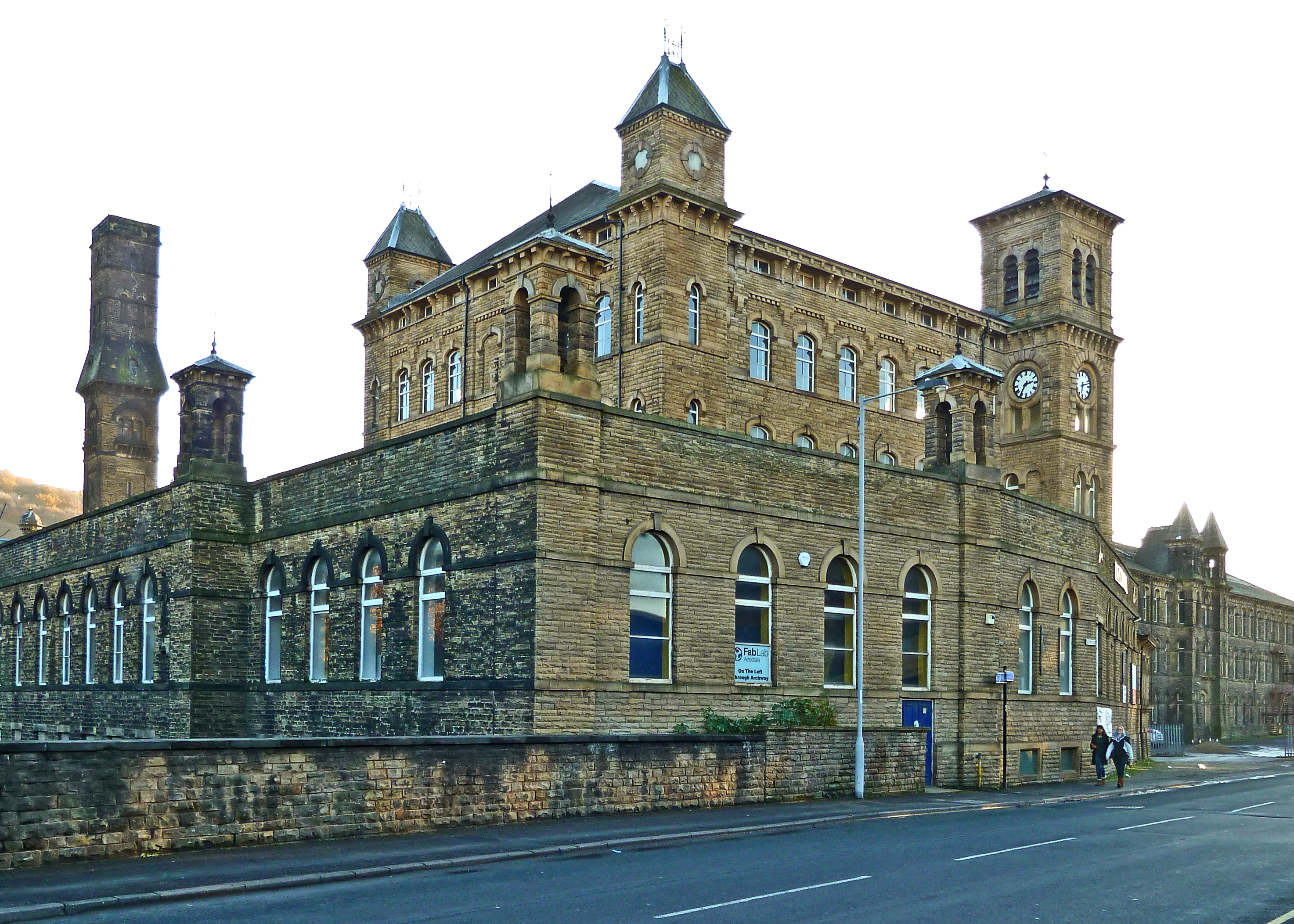
- Dalton Mills on 10 November 2012

- Location within West Yorkshire
- 53°52′08″N 01°53′42″W
- Location: Keighley, West Yorkshire, England

History
- Founder: Joseph Craven
- Built: 1869
- Built for: Replacement for the former Strong Close Mill
- Original use: Textile mill

Site notes
- Area: 45,681 sq ft (4,243.9 m^{2})

Listed Building – Grade II*
- Designated: 4 December 1986
- Reference no.: 1134129

Dalton Mills is a 19th-century Grade II* Victorian former textile mill located in Keighley, West Yorkshire, England. It was roughly 45,681 sq ft (4,243.9 m^{2}) in size. Previously used as a set for Peaky Blinders, it was once claimed to be the largest textile mill in Yorkshire, massing over 2,000 employees. The internal parts of the building were destroyed by a large fire that broke out on 3 March 2022.

== History ==
Dalton Mills was constructed in 1869 by Joseph Craven and was designed as a worsted mill and as a replacement for the former Strong Close Mill, owned by Rachel Leach. The mill was named after Dalton, who was the manager employed by Leach. It was said to be the largest textile mill in Yorkshire, having over 2,000 employees.

Due to the decline of the textile industry, the mill was virtually empty up until 2004. John Craven, the great-great-grandson of Joseph Craven, eventually sold the mill to Magna Holdings to ensure its permanence.

In 2015, the building was taken off English Heritage's at-risk register after being partially restored due to falling in disrepair.

The building was used as a set for multiple series, including Peaky Blinders and Downton Abbey.

=== 2011 fire ===
On 1 January 2011 at around 6:50 pm GMT, a fire broke out at Dalton Mills with around 100 firefighters at the scene, destroying parts of the building. The West Yorkshire Fire Service treated the outbreak as "suspicious" with Chris Clarke stating that the fire was started by a group of people who were not permitted to be there. The outbreak was later confirmed to be an arson attack by copper thieves as they attempted to burn the insulation off so as to steal the metal.

=== 2022 fire ===
On 3 March 2022 at around 12 pm GMT, an inferno broke out, engulfing and damaging the entire building and completely destroying the interior, along with the floor and roof. More than 100 firefighters were reported at the scene and were sent with 20 pumps, according to the West Yorkshire Fire and Rescue Service. The fire service informed nearby residents of the fire, telling them to keep windows and doors shut and to avoid travelling. The Leisure Centre in Keighley was opened up by the Bradford council to provide shelter to affected residents. The fire was deemed extinguished on 6 March at 3:30 pm GMT. The incident was described to be "a sad loss to the Yorkshire filmmaking landscape" by Richard Knight with Screen Yorkshire. West Yorkshire Police stated that five suspects were arrested over the suspected arson attack and were being questioned. They were later released on bail, with further inquiries pending.

After the fire, it was assumed that the mill would have to be torn down due to safety concerns. However, an inspection conducted by Historic England confirmed that the mill is stable and does not need to be demolished, but stated that the future of it has yet to be decided.

=== 2025 fire ===
On 26 July 2025 a further fire occurred at the site as a result of Arson. The mills are currently in a state of "in near collapse" according to its owners.

The mills after a recent fire in September 2026

=== 2026 fires ===
In February 2026, two fires occurred at Dalton Mills within six days of each other. Both fires were reported as having been deliberately started. Bradford Council subsequently referred to ongoing arson attacks at the site in March 2026.

On 12 September 2026, at around 20:00, a further fire was reported. At its peak there were 12 fire engines on scene, while local residents were advised to keep windows and doors closed and some were evacuated. As of 08:00 2026-09-13, WYFRS have reported that the situation is ongoing and two fire engines were still in attendance, but that the situation was under control.

On 17 November 2026 another fire was reported, with a wagon within the grounds of the mill set ablaze. WYFRS later stated that the fire was recorded as suspected deliberate ignition.

== See also ==
- Listed buildings in Keighley
