= Listed buildings in Keighley =

Keighley is a civil parish in the metropolitan borough of the City of Bradford, West Yorkshire, England. It contains 192 listed buildings that are recorded in the National Heritage List for England. Of these, three are listed at Grade I, the highest of the three grades, three are at Grade II*, the middle grade, and the others are at Grade II, the lowest grade. The parish includes the town of Keighley, the settlements of East Morton, Hainworth, Ingrow, Laycock, Oakworth, Oldfield, Riddlesden, and Utley, and the surrounding countryside and moorland.

Until the late 18th century Keighley was a market town, and it then became a centre for the textile industry, with a great growth of population during the 19th century. The surrounding area is almost completely rural, with small scattered settlements. Most of the listed buildings are houses, cottages and associated structures, farmhouses, and farm buildings. The other listed buildings include boundary markers, a cross base, a cross built into a wall, a former corn mill and textile mills, guidestones, mileposts, an aqueduct and bridge on the Leeds and Liverpool Canal, public houses, road bridges, a footbridge, a clapper bridge, two former packhorse bridges, churches, chapels and associated structures, a drill hall, civic buildings, railway stations and associated structures, a bank, offices and shops, a limekiln, and three telephone kiosks.

== Key ==
| Grade | Criteria |
|---|---|
| I | Buildings of exceptional interest, sometimes considered to be internationally important |
| II* | Particularly important buildings of more than special interest |
| II | Buildings of national importance and special interest |

== Buildings ==
| Name and location | Photograph | Date | Notes | Grade |
|---|---|---|---|---|
| Hanging stone 53.84071°N 2.04518°W | | Medieval | Also known as Water Sheddles Cross, it consists of a large millstone grit block that was a boundary marker. The stone leans at an angle of about 45 degrees, and is carved on the top with a cross and on the side with an inscription. It is also a scheduled monument. | II |
| Marley Hall; 53.86239°N 1.86318°W | — | 1627 | The house, which has been altered, is in stone with quoins, and coped gables with kneelers and finials. There are two storeys, and an L-shaped plan with a hall range of three bays, and a projecting gabled wing to the left. On the front is an open gabled porch containing an arch on columns with imposts. Inside the porch are benches, and the inner doorway has a Tudor arch. The windows are mullioned and some also have transoms. At the rear is a plinth, a segmental-arched doorway with a chamfered surround, and a taking-in door with interrupted jambs in the upper floor. | II |
| East Riddlesden Hall; 53.87475°N 1.88132°W | | 1640 | A large house incorporating earlier material with an extension added in 1692. It is in stone with a stone slate roof, and consists of a main block with two storeys and attics, and an earlier single-storey bay. Both main fronts contain a two-storey porch and gabled bays. Each porch has a round-arched doorway with moulded voussoirs, fluted Corinthian columns, and an entablature with a moulded cornice. Above it is a wheel window with a hood mould, and an embattled parapet with crocketed pinnacles. The windows are mullioned and transomed or mullioned. | I |
| Laverock Hall; 53.83919°N 1.97888°W | — | 1641 | A stone house that has a stone slate roof with coped gables. There are two storeys and three gabled bays. The doorway has a Tudor arched head, and the windows either have single lights or are mullioned; all the lights are round-headed. Above the mullioned windows are hood moulds. | II |
| Near Scholes Farmhouse; 53.83976°N 1.97632°W | — | 1641 | The farmhouse is in stone with a stone slate roof, two storeys and a rear outshut. On the front is an open porch with a lean-to roof containing stone seats, and with a doorway that has a moulded surround and a dated shaped lintel. The windows are mullioned, including a ten-light window at the rear. | II |
| Shop, East Riddlesden Hall; 53.87486°N 1.88107°W | — | 1642 | The outbuilding, later used as a shop, is in stone on a chamfered plinth, with an embattled parapet, raised coped verges with finials, and a stone slate roof. There are two storeys, and in the ground floor are four doorways with chamfered surrounds and decorative heads. The upper floor contains two-light mullioned windows, and in the parapet are carved masks and an inscription. In the right gable end, external steps lead up to a doorway in the upper floor. | II |
| Manor House, Braithwaite; 53.86969°N 1.94093°W | — | 1648 | The house, later divided into three dwellings, is in stone, with a stone slate roof and two storeys. It contains a doorway with a chamfered surround and a shaped dated lintel. The windows are mullioned, most with hood moulds. | II |
| 10 Braithwaite Village; 53.86978°N 1.94122°W | — | 17th century | A stone house that has a stone slate roof with coped gables, and two storeys. There are two 20th-century doorways in the outer parts, and the windows are mullioned. In the ground floor are windows with eight and four lights under a continuous hood mould, and the upper floor contains one window with two lights and two windows with four lights. | II |
| 9 Little Lane, East Morton; 53.87476°N 1.84876°W | — | 17th century | The house, which was remodelled in the 18th century, is in stone with quoins, a band, a modillioned eaves cornice, and a stone slate roof. There are two storeys and three bays. The central doorway has a plain surround and a moulded cornice. To the right is a Venetian window, and the other windows on the front are sashes. At the rear is a central doorway with a fluted surround, and mullioned windows, and in the right return are two round-arched windows, one with sunk spandrels. | II |
| 3–6 The Square, East Morton; 53.87491°N 1.85012°W | — | 17th century | A house, later divided into four dwellings, it is in stone on a chamfered plinth, with a stone slate roof and two storeys. The original doorway has a chamfered surround, and the windows are mullioned, with some mullions removed. Above the ground floor openings is a continuous hood mould. | II |
| 8 Holme House Lane; 53.85756°N 1.95827°W | — | 17th century | Formerly a farmhouse, it is in stone with quoins and a stone slate roof. There are two storeys, two bays, and an extension to the left. In the main part are mullioned windows, with hood moulds over the ground floor windows. The extension contains a 20th-century doorway, a slit window, and a three-light window. | II |
| 40 and 42 High Street, Keighley; 53.86571°N 1.91171°W | | 17th century | A house that was extended in the 18th century and later converted into two shops. It is in stone with quoins, a moulded string course, a moulded eaves cornice and a stone slate roof. There are two storeys and a rear wing. In the ground floor are 20th-century shop fronts, the upper floor contains five windows with moulded surrounds, and in the rear wing are mullioned windows. | II |
| 9 Birchwood Road, Low Utley; 53.88236°N 1.91839°W | — | 17th century | A stone house with a stone slate roof, two storeys, and two bays. The windows are mullioned, and at the rear a doorway has been converted into a window. | II |
| Ashcroft Farmhouse; 53.83724°N 1.98995°W | — | 17th century | The farmhouse, which was later altered, is in stone on a plinth, with quoins, and a stone slate roof with coped gables and shaped kneelers. There are two storeys and five bays. Some windows have single lights, and the others are mullioned. In the ground floor are two doorways and to the right is a doorway converted into a window that has a chamfered surround and a dated Tudor arched head. Also in the ground floor is an ogee-headed opening, and above the ground floor openings is a continuous hood mould. At the rear is a round-arched stair window with a chamfered quoined surround, a keystone, and impost blocks. | II |
| Barn, Ashcroft Farm; 53.83697°N 1.98954°W | — | 17th century | The barn, which was later altered, is in millstone grit, and has a stone slate roof with coped gables and kneelers. There are three bays, and an outshut on the right. The barn contains a recessed cart entry, and two doorways with chamfered surrounds, one with a Tudor arched lintel. In the outshut is a doorway with a chamfered surround and slit vents, one round-headed. | II |
| Bank House; 53.88355°N 1.89286°W | — | 17th century | The house, which was later refronted and altered, is in stone with quoins, and a hipped stone slate roof. There are two storeys and five bays. The central doorway has fluted pilasters, a fanlight, and a gabled hood, and the windows on the front are sashes. At the rear are mullioned windows, with some mullions removed, there is a small round-arched window, and a stone mounting block attached to the wall. | II |
| Cross base 53.85767°N 1.92807°W | | 17th century (probable) | The cross base is by the roadside, and consists of a large polygonal and tapering stone block. The centre is squared and hollowed. | II |
| Damems Farmhouse and cottages 53.84628°N 1.92984°W | — | 17th century | A farmhouse and two attached cottages, the farmhouse is the older part, with the cottages dating from the 18th century and later. The buildings are in stone, with quoins, stone slate roofs, and two storeys. The house contains mullioned windows with some mullions missing, and a sash window. The cottage to the right has square casement windows, and the cottage to the left has a coped gable and kneelers, and mullioned windows. | II |
| Dene Farmhouse and barn 53.88042°N 1.86318°W | — | 17th century | The farmhouse and barn are in stone, and have a stone slate roof with coped gables and kneelers. The house has two storeys and three bays. In the centre is a porch, above it is a small inserted window, and the other windows are mullioned, with most mullions removed. The barn is attached at right angles. | II |
| Barn, Elam Grange; 53.88393°N 1.90331°W | | 17th century (or earlier) | A stone barn that has a stone slate roof with coped gables. There are four bays and an aisle. The barn contains a large square opening on the east, three doorways with chamfered surrounds, and small windows in the aisle. Inside are cruck trusses. | II |
| Barn northeast of East Riddlesden Hall; 53.87545°N 1.88031°W | | 17th century | A stone barn that has a stone slate roof with coped gables and finials. There are eight bays and an aisle, and it is 120 feet (37 m) long and 40 feet (12 m) wide. On each side are two round-arched gabled cart entrances, and the barn also contains trefoil-headed doorways and round-headed vents with decorated spandrels. | I |
| Barn east of entrance to East Riddlesden Hall; 53.87585°N 1.88074°W | | 17th century | A stone barn on a chamfered plinth, with quoins, and a stone slate roof with coped gables. The barn has an aisle, and contains a central recessed cart entry flanked by Tudor arched doorways with chamfered surrounds. At the rear is a cart entry with quoined jambs, a wooden lintel and corbels. Elsewhere there are round-arched slit vents. | II |
| Garden wall, falcons' mews and gate piers, East Riddlesden Hall; 53.87461°N 1.88189°W | — | 17th century | The garden wall to the southwest of the hall is in stone, and it contains two tiers of niches, the upper tier with decorative heads. The gate piers are in rusticated stone with moulded plinths and cornices, and there are attached columns with scrolled tops. | II |
| Mounting block, East Riddlesden Hall; 53.87508°N 1.88124°W | | 17th century (probable) | The mounting block is by the edge of the lake to the north of the hall. It is in stone, and has four steps on each side. | II |
| Toilets, East Riddlesden Hall; 53.87500°N 1.88085°W | — | 17th century | Originally an outbuilding, later converted into toilets, the building is in stone with quoins, and a stone slate roof with coped gables. There is one storey, and it contains two doorways with trefoil heads, and round-headed slit vents. | II |
| Field Head Farmhouse; 53.88150°N 1.86734°W | — | 17th century | The farmhouse is in stone with a stone slate roof, two storeys, and three bays. The doorway is in the centre, and the windows are mullioned, with some mullions removed. | II |
| Barn, Green End Farm; 53.87609°N 1.85018°W | — | 17th century (probable) | A stone barn that has a stone slate roof with coped gables and kneelers. It contains a segmental-arched cart entry and small square vents. | II |
| Heights Farmhouse and barn 53.88469°N 1.88067°W | — | 17th century | The farmhouse and attached barn are in stone with a stone slate roof. The house has two storeys, and a gabled porch with a small square window above. The other windows are mullioned with some mullions removed and sash windows inserted. The barn contains a segmental-arched cart entry. | II |
| High Fold Farmhouse; 53.85850°N 1.92861°W | — | Mid 17th century | The farmhouse, which has been altered, is in stone with quoins and a stone slate roof. There are two storeys and five bays. The original doorway, which has been converted into a window, has a quoined surround and a chamfered lintel, and in the centre is an inserted doorway. The windows are mullioned, the window to the right of the central doorway has round-headed lights, and there is a continuous hood mould over the ground floor openings. | II |
| Intake Farmhouse and Cottage; 53.86510°N 1.93422°W | — | 17th century | The cottage was added to the farmhouse in 1705. The buildings are in stone, with quoins, a stone slate roof with coped gables and kneelers, and two storeys. The house has two bays, and the cottage, which is recessed to the right, has one bay. The doorway at the rear has chamfered quoined surround and a Tudor arched, dated and initialled lintel. There is another doorway with a plain surround and interrupted jambs, and the windows is both parts are mullioned, some with hood moulds. | II |
| Jack Fields; 53.86338°N 1.87928°W | — | 17th century | A stone farmhouse that has a stone slate roof with kneelers, one with a double cross. There are two storeys, and most of the windows are mullioned, some with hood moulds. | II |
| Lower Laithe; 53.85434°N 1.96316°W | — | 17th century | The house, which was altered in the 19th century, is in stone with a stone slate roof. There are two storeys, and it contains a blocked 17th-century doorway with a shaped lintel, another blocked doorway to the left, and an inserted 20th-century doorway. The windows are mullioned. | II |
| Manor House and Rose Cottage; 53.86477°N 1.95386°W | | 17th century | The house was later altered, extended, and divided. It is in stone and has a stone slate roof with coped gables, shaped kneelers and finials. The house, which is on sloping ground, has a gabled front with three storeys, and there are two storeys at the rear. The front contains mullioned and transomed windows with hood moulds, and some transoms removed. To the right is a single-storey extension containing a doorway with a decorated lintel, and to the left is the cottage, with a single storey and a single bay, a doorway and a mullioned window. | II |
| Front garden wall, Marley; 53.86249°N 1.86308°W | — | 17th century | The wall is in stone and has moulded coping. It rises over a segmental-arched entrance above which is a gable containing a coat of arms and with a finial. | II |
| Moorside Farmhouse and barn 53.88450°N 1.87022°W | — | 17th century | The farmhouse and attached barn are in stone with stone slate roofs. The house has two storeys, and contains a window converted into a doorway with a porch. Some of the windows are mullioned, and others date from the 20th century. The barn to the west contains a segmental-arched cart entry. | II |
| Ponden Corn Mill; 53.83117°N 2.00247°W | — | Mid 17th century | The former corn mill is in gritstone with quoins and a pantile roof. It contains an inserted garage door, and mullioned windows. | II |
| Riddlesden College; 53.88059°N 1.89164°W | — | 17th century | Originally the barn to West Riddlesden Hall, later converted into a college, it is in stone, and has a stone slate roof with coped gables and shaped kneelers. There are two storeys and an L-shaped plan, with two ranges at right angles. The barn range contains a round-arched gabled cart entry with chamfered voussoirs, chamfered quoined doorways, round-headed windows, and round-headed vents with sunken spandrels. The mistral range contains three chamfered quoined doorways, and later doors and windows. | II |
| Ridge Cottage, White Rose Cottage and Willow Cottage; 53.85517°N 1.97029°W | — | 17th century | A house, later altered and divided into three, it is in stone with a stone slate roof, and two storeys. There are two gabled porches, and doorways with varied surrounds. Some of the windows have single lights, most are mullioned, some mullions have been removed, some windows have round-headed lights and sunk spandrels, and some have hood moulds. | II |
| Scar Top Farm; 53.83211°N 2.00976°W | | 17th century | A farmhouse, farm buildings and cottages, all attached and forming four dwellings. They are in painted stone, and have stone slate roofs with a coped gable and a kneeler on the right. There are two storeys, most of the windows are mullioned, there are two sash windows, some windows have hood moulds, and in the former barn is a blocked round-headed vent and a lean-to byre. | II |
| Slippery Ford Farmhouse, barn and mistal 53.86288°N 1.99826°W | | 17th century | The farmhouse and attached barn and mistal are in stone with a string course and a stone slate roof. The house has two storeys, and contains a doorway with a moulded surround and a shaped lintel. The windows either have single lights or are mullioned. The barn and mistal have an irregular plan and contain mullioned windows. | II |
| Slitherford; 53.86086°N 1.99763°W | | 17th century | The farmhouse was extended to the west in the 19th century. It is in stone with a stone slate roof. There are two storeys, the original part has two bays, the extension is taller, and has one bay. The extension contains a doorway with a fanlight, and in both parts the windows are mullioned, with hood moulds over the ground floor windows. | II |
| Two Laws Farmhouse, barn and cottage 53.83919°N 2.03048°W | — | 17th century | The cottage was added in the 18th century. The buildings are in stone on a boulder plinth, they have stone slate roofs, and two storeys. The house has mullioned windows and a continuous hood mould over the ground floor openings. The cottage is on the east end and contains a six-light mullioned window. The barn is on the west, it is taller, and at the rear is a round-arched cart entry. | II |
| Utley House; 53.88229°N 1.91891°W | — | 17th century | The house, which was later extended, is in stone with a stone slate roof, and two storeys. The doorway has a segmental arch, and the windows are mullioned. At the rear is a doorway with a dated keystone and a stair window. | II |
| 1, 1A, 3, 5, 7 and 9 Chapel Lane, Keighley; 53.86591°N 1.91120°W | — | 1660 | A house, including a former loading bay, it was converted into separate dwellings in the early 19th century. The building is in stone with quoins, shaped gutter brackets, and a stone slate roof with a coped gable and a shaped kneeler on the right. There are three storeys. Nos. 1, 1A and 3 have shop fronts in the ground floor, and the upper floors contain single-light windows and a blocked taking-in door. To the right is a round-arched passage doorway with voussoirs. In the part to the right of this are doorways and windows; other than a shop window in No. 5, the windows in the lower two floors have three lights, the middle light wider and taller. At the rear is a round-headed stair window. | II |
| Green End Farmhouse, barn and cottage 53.87616°N 1.84967°W | — | 1664 | The farmhouse, attached barn and former cottage are in stone with stone slate roofs. The front of the house was remodelled in the 18th century, it has a string course, two storeys, and contains a doorway, now blocked, with a dated lintel. The windows are mullioned, those in the ground floor also have transoms. The former cottage on the left has a doorway with a plain surround and a small window. Further to the left, the barn contains a round-arched cart entry, above which is a gable containing pigeon holes and a small dated window. | II |
| 67, 71, 73 and 75 Exley Road, Keighley; 53.85811°N 1.92538°W | — | Mid to late 17th century | A house, later divided, it is in stone, rendered at the front, with quoins, and a stone slate roof with coped gables and shaped kneelers. There are two storeys and a rear range. The house contains a datestone, mullioned windows with some mullions removed, doorways, and 20th-century garage doors. | II |
| Dean Field Cottages; 53.83552°N 2.01985°W | — | Mid to late 17th century | Two attached houses, the later one on the right dating from the 18th century, they are in millstone grit, with quoins, and a stone slate roof with a coped gable and shaped kneelers on the right. They have two storeys, and the left house has four bays, and a two-storey gabled porch containing a Tudor arched doorway with a chamfered and quoined surround, and a deep lintel with sunk spandrels. Both houses have other doorways, and most windows are mullioned with some mullions removed. | II |
| Dean Fields Farmhouse; 53.83459°N 2.01179°W | — | Mid to late 17th century | A house and two attached cottages, later combined, they are in millstone grit, with two storeys, and stone slate roofs with coped gables and shaped kneelers. The house has a chamfered plinth, quoins, and a gabled porch containing a doorway with a chamfered and quoined surround and an ogee-moulded lintel inscribed with a date, initials and scrolls. There is a continuous hood mould over the ground floor openings. The first cottage is recessed on the left, and has a doorway with a quoined surround and a dated and initialled lintel. The other cottage is further to the left and contains doorways with chamfered and quoined surrounds and deep lintels. All parts have mullioned windows, with some mullions removed. | II |
| 18, 20, 22, 24 and 26 Main Street, Laycock; 53.86586°N 1.95191°W | — | 1666 | A house and a pair of cottages, possibly incorporating earlier material, later extended into five dwellings, they are in stone, on a plinth, and have a stone slate roof with a coped gable on the left. There are two storeys, the original part has three bays, and a bay has been added at each end. The doorways have plain surrounds, one has a porch, and the windows are mullioned, some with hood moulds. | II |
| Newsholme Dean Farmhouse and barn 53.86116°N 1.96996°W | — | 1666 (probable) | The farmhouse and attached barn are in stone with stone slate roofs. The house has two storeys, a gabled porch with a Tudor arched entrance, and mullioned windows, with some mullions removed. The barn, to the left, has a segmental-arched cart entry and slit vents. | II |
| Laurel Bank; 53.87450°N 1.85019°W | — | 1669 | A stone house on a chamfered plinth with a stone slate roof. There are two storeys, and a central doorway with a fanlight and a keystone. On each floor are two mullioned and transomed windows, and above the ground floor openings is a continuous hood mould. At the rear is a doorway inscribed with the date and initials. | II |
| Manor Farmhouse; 53.83657°N 1.99034°W | — | 1669 | The farmhouse, which was later divided, it is stone with a stone slate roof. There are two storeys, a main range and a cross-wing. On the right is a two-storey gabled porch that has a doorway with a moulded surround and a shaped dated lintel. The upper storey projects, the gable is coped and has kneelers, and it contains an oculus. On the front is an initialled datestone, the ground floor windows have been altered, and elsewhere they are mullioned, with some mullions removed. | II |
| Church Farmhouse, Church and Sunday School, Newsholme; 53.85457°N 1.97028°W | | 1670 | A large house that was converted into a house, church and Sunday school in 1844. It is in stone with stone slate roofs, and two storeys. The house has a plinth, and contains mullioned windows with round-headed lights and hood moulds. In the right return is a porch that has a doorway with a quoined and chamfered surround, a decorated lintel, and a datestone above. Inside the porch are stone benches. The church is to the left, it is taller, and has four bays. In the left bay is a doorway with a quoined and chamfered surround, and the windows are mullioned and transomed. On the left gable is a bellcote. | II |
| Moorlands Farmhouse and Cottage; 53.88082°N 1.85163°W | — | 1670 | The cottage was added later, and the buildings are in stone with a stone slate roof. The house has two storeys and three bays. It contains a doorway converted into a window that has a chamfered quoined surround and a dated lintel. To the left is a 20th-century doorway with interrupted jambs. The cottage to the right is taller, and has two storeys and a basement, and one bay. It has a coped gable with moulded kneelers, and it contains quoins. The windows in both parts are mullioned, with some mullions removed. | II |
| 2 Holme House Lane; 53.85782°N 1.95809°W | — | 1675 | A farmhouse divided into two in the 19th century, it is in stone with quoins, gutter brackets set in threes, and a stone slate roof with coped gables and shaped kneelers. There are two storeys and two bays, and on the front are two doorways with plain surrounds. The windows are mullioned, with three stepped lights. At the rear is a doorway with a quoined surround, and a moulded dated lintel. | II |
| Dixon Hill Farmhouse; 53.83656°N 1.99137°W | — | c. 1675 | A stone farmhouse with a stone slate roof and two storeys. In the centre is a porch, there are some inserted later windows, and most windows are mullioned, those in the ground floor with hood moulds. | II |
| Gate piers, East Riddlesden Hall; 53.87587°N 1.88108°W | | Late 17th century (probable) | The gate piers are in stone and have a square section, heavy moulded cornices, and ball finials on moulded bases. On the inner and south faces are pilasters. | II |
| Elam Grange; 53.88329°N 1.90392°W | | Late 17th century (probable) | The house was altered in the 18th century, it is in stone with quoins, a stone slate roof, and two storeys. The doorway has a chamfered surround, most of the windows are mullioned, with some mullions removed, and there is a stair cross window. | II |
| Glen Esk Farmhouse; 53.88091°N 1.86522°W | — | Late 17th century | A farmhouse and barn, later combined, it is in stone and has a stone slate roof with coped gables and kneelers. The former house has two storeys and an attic, and three bays. In the centre is a doorway with moulded jambs and a shaped lintel. Above the doorway is a circular window, and the other windows are mullioned, those in the ground floor with hood moulds. In the right gable end is a doorway with a chamfered surround and a Tudor arched head. The former barn has a segmental arched doorway, and an inserted bow window. | II |
| Green End Farmhouse; 53.85376°N 1.96992°W | — | Late 17th century | The farmhouse is in stone on a chamfered plinth, and has a stone slate roof with coped gables and shaped kneelers. There are two storeys and two bays. In the centre is a 20th-century doorway, the windows are mullioned, with some mullions removed, and there are hood moulds over the ground floor windows. The original doorway is in the right gable end, and has a moulded quoined surround and a false ogee-moulded lintel. | II |
| Higher Scholes Farmhouse and barn 53.83965°N 1.97271°W | — | Late 17th century | The farmhouse and attached barn are in stone, with quoins, a stone slate roof with a coped gable on the left, and two storeys. The house has four bays, and contains doorways, and mullioned windows with some mullions removed. The barn on the left has three bays and an outshut on the front. It contains a central cart entry with a quoined surround and a massive lintel, doorways with quoined and chamfered surrounds, a mullioned window, and blocked vents. | II |
| Manor Farmhouse and Cottage; 53.87970°N 1.91856°W | — | 1677 | The original farmhouse was later extended. The building is in stone with quoins, a stone slate roof with coped gables and kneelers, and two storeys. The earlier part has a plinth, and contains an arched doorway with a quoined and moulded surround, and a dated lintel. The later part has a doorway with a chamfered and quoined surround and a round-arched vent, the windows in both parts are mullioned with some mullions removed, and some windows have hood moulds. | II |
| Oldfield House and Cottage; 53.83616°N 1.99192°W | — | 1677 | The house was extended on both sides in about 1820, and has been divided. It is in stone, it has a stone slate roof with coped gables and kneelers, and there are two storeys. In the central part is a doorway with an architrave, a frieze and a pediment, and the windows are mullioned. The right extension has a bracketed moulded eaves cornice, and contains a bay window and sash windows. The extension to the left was a coach house wing, and contains a re-set datestone. | II |
| 82 and 84 Main Road, Laycock; 53.86453°N 1.95411°W | — | 1685 | A house, later divided, at the end of a row, it is in stone with a stone slate roof and a coped gable and kneelers on the right. There are two storeys and an attic, and each house has one bay. The windows are mullioned, and each house has an inserted 20th-century doorway on the front. In the right gable end is the original doorway that has a chamfered surround and a dated lintel, and above it is a semicircular-headed window. | II |
| Clough House Farmhouse; 53.84378°N 1.95448°W | — | 1686 | A stone farmhouse with a stone slate roof, two storeys and five bays. On the front is a gabled porch with a moulded opening, a dated lintel, and a hood mould. A garage door has been inserted, and the windows are mullioned. Inside there is an inglenook fireplace. | II |
| West Riddlesden Hall; 53.88037°N 1.89084°W | — | 1687 | A large house that was later altered, it is in stone on a chamfered plinth, with a stone slate roof, two storeys and attics. The south front has three bays, each with a gable that has moulded coping and a ball finial, and contains an upright oval window in a square surround. The doorway has a moulded architrave, and the windows are mullioned and transomed. At the rear is a wing with an entrance front of four bays. In the second bay is a two-storey flat-roofed porch containing a doorway with a moulded surround and a hood mould, above which is a round window with a hood mould, string courses, and a coped parapet. The fourth bay is gabled and contains a two-storey canted bay window. The windows on this front are mullioned, some with hood moulds. | I |
| Blakey Cottage and Blakey House; 53.86242°N 1.86516°W | — | 1694 | A house, later divided, it is in stone with quoins, and a stone slate roof with kneelers on the right. There are two storeys, and the house consists of a two-bay range and a cross-wing on the left. On the front is a doorway with a quoined surround and a datestone above, and at the rear is a doorway with a chamfered and quoined surround converted into a window. The cross-wing has a plinth, it contains similar doorways, and there are mullioned windows in both parts. | II |
| Barn, Near Scholes Farm; 53.83952°N 1.97644°W | — | 1698 | The barn is in stone with a stone slate roof. It contains a segmental-arched cart entry, and the loft doorway has a segmental-shaped and dated lintel. On the front are two rows of round-headed vents with decorated spandrels, and in the gable end are slit vents. | II |
| Low Banks; 53.87883°N 1.88180°W | — | 1700 | A stone house, later divided, with a string course, and a stone slate roof with coped gables and shaped kneelers. There are two storeys and a front of five bays. The central doorway has a moulded architrave, and above it is an initialled datestone and a window with a moulded architrave. The windows on the front are cross windows with sashes inserted, and elsewhere they are mullioned. | II |
| Barn, High Ash Farm; 53.88259°N 1.86093°W | — | Late 17th to early 18th century | A stone barn with quoins and a stone slate roof with coped gables and kneelers. It contains a segmental-arched cart entrance, three inserted windows, and round-headed slit vents. | II |
| Oldfield House Farmhouse; 53.83585°N 1.99307°W | — | Late 17th to early 18th century | A farmhouse and cottage, later combined, they are in stone on a chamfered plinth and have a stone slate roof with a coped gable and kneelers. There are two storeys and five bays. Two doorways have chamfered and quoined surrounds, and a third is blocked. The windows are mullioned and there are hood moulds. | II |
| Sutton Stoop; 53.87552°N 1.97695°W | | Late 17th to early 18th century | A boundary stone marking the boundary between North and West Yorkshire. It is a rectangular stone with a rounded head, and is inscribed with a Maltese cross with "SUTTON" below, and at the base is a benchmark. | II |
| Oakworth Hall; 53.84530°N 1.95224°W | | 1702 | A stone house that has a stone slate roof with a coped gable and kneelers. The doorway on the front has a lintel with three recessed semicircles and a spiral pattern. Above it is a carved stone and a large inscribed tablet. The doorway at the rear has a chamfered surround and a shaped and dated lintel with two semicircles. The windows are mullioned. | II |
| 13 and 14 Hainworth Village; 53.84815°N 1.91102°W | — | 18th century | A pair of stone cottages with a stone slate roof. There are two storeys and three bays. On the front are three 20th-century doors, and three three-light mullioned windows in each floor. | II |
| Airedale Heifer Public House and barn 53.86957°N 1.86432°W | | Mid 18th century | A house with a barn at right angles, later converted into a public house, it is in stone with a stone slate roof and two storeys. The house has rusticated quoins, a coped gable with kneelers on the left, and five bays. In the centre is a round-arched doorway with a keystone and a cornice, and the windows are sashes, with a continuous hood mould over the ground floor windows. In the left gable end are cross windows, and an oculus in the apex. The roof of the barn is hipped to the right, and the barn contains three inserted doorways and two tiers of blocked round-headed vents on the front, and in the rear are a segmental-arched cart entry with a quoined surround and two wide doorways. | II |
| Bankhouse Farm; 53.86962°N 1.94216°W | — | 18th century | The house is in sandstone, with gritstone quoins, and a stone slate roof with coped gables and shaped kneelers. There are two storeys and three bays. On the front and the rear are porches, and the windows are mullioned, with some mullions removed. At the rear is a round-headed stair window with a keystone and imposts, and in the right gable end is a doorway with a quoined surround and single-light windows. | II |
| Croft House; 53.87435°N 1.85035°W | — | 18th century | The house, which was later enlarged, is in stone with quoins, and a stone slate roof with coped gables and shaped kneelers. There are two storeys and two bays, with a later bay added at an angle to the left. In the original range is a gabled porch, a doorway in an architrave, and mullioned windows. The extension contains a doorway and a 20th-century window. | II |
| Outbuilding and garage, Croft House; 53.87426°N 1.85049°W | — | 18th century | Originally a stable, barn and cottage, the building is in stone with quoins, and a stone slate roof. The barn and cottage were taller, there are two storeys, and each part has two bays. The doorways have interrupted jambs, the windows either have single lights or are mullioned, and the building contains a segmental-arched cart entry with a quoined surround and voussoirs, pigeon holes, and round-headed slit vents. On the left gable is a weathervane. | II |
| Barn, Dixon Hill Farm; 53.83663°N 1.99076°W | — | 18th century | A large stone barn with quoins and a corrugated iron roof. It contains two segmental-arched cart entries with quoined surrounds and voussoirs, doorways with quoined and chamfered surrounds, and round-arched slit vents. | II |
| Farm buildings northeast of Elam Grange; 53.88372°N 1.90303°W | — | 18th century | Originally two cottages and a barn, later all farm buildings, they are in stone and have a stone slate roof with kneelers. The former cottages have two storeys, and contain mullioned windows. The barn contains a segmental-arched cart entry, and there is a lean-to with a catslide roof on the west side. | II |
| High Ash Farmhouse; 53.88283°N 1.86071°W | — | 18th century | The farmhouse is in stone with chamfered quoins and a stone slate roof with kneelers. There are two storeys, and a central block of two bays flanked by one-bay wings. In the centre is a doorway, and the windows are mullioned. | II |
| High Hob Cote Cottages; 53.84107°N 1.97169°W | — | Mid 18th century | A pair of stone cottages with quoins, and a stone slate roof with coped gables and kneelers. Each cottage has a doorway with a plain surround and an impost block to the right, and the windows are mullioned. | II |
| Kirkstall Wood Farmhouse and barn 53.85304°N 1.90316°W | — | 18th century | The farmhouse and attached barn are in stone with stone slate roofs. The house has two storeys, a lean-to porch, and mullioned windows, some of them replacements. In the barn is a segmental-arched cart entry with a lean-to canopy. | II |
| Pole Stoop; 53.87136°N 1.98026°W | | 18th century (probable) | A boundary stone marking the boundary between North Yorkshire and West Yorkshire, it consists of a gritstone pillar about 2 metres (6 ft 7 in) high, and leaning at an angle of about 50 degrees. The pillar is inscribed with letters on two sides. | II |
| West House Farmhouse and Cottages; 53.83804°N 1.98470°W | — | 18th century | The farmhouse and attached cottages are in stone, with quoins, a stone slate roof, and two storeys. On the front is a porch on a plinth, with a shaped, dated and initialled lintel, and a coped gable with kneelers. There are four doorways, two with quoined surrounds, one with a plain surround, and one with interrupted jambs. The windows are mullioned, with some mullions removed, and on the front are two inscribed and dated stones. | II |
| 7 and 9 Leach Way, Riddlesden; 53.88033°N 1.89219°W | — | 1756 | A pair of houses at the end of a terrace, they are in stone, No. 9 is rendered, with quoins, and a stone slate roof with a coped gable and kneelers on the right. There are two storeys and each house has one bay. The windows are mullioned, with some mullions removed. | II |
| 2, 3 and 4 Croft Road, East Morton; 53.87409°N 1.85074°W | — | Mid to late 18th century | A house, later three cottages, it is in stone with quoins and a stone slate roof. The doorways have plain surrounds, and the windows are mullioned with some mullions removed. | II |
| 5 Croft Road, East Morton; 53.87398°N 1.85080°W | — | Mid to late 18th century | A stone house with a stone slate roof and two storeys. The doorway has a plain surround and interrupted jambs, and above it is a single-light window. The other windows are mullioned. | II |
| Back Shaw House and barn 53.85205°N 1.89664°W | — | Mid to late 18th century | A farmhouse and cottage, later combined, and a barn added at right angles in 1840. The buildings are in stone, and have stone slate roofs with coped gables and kneelers. The house and the cottage, which protrudes on the left, have two storeys, and windows that are either mullioned or have single lights. The barn contains a segmental-arched cart entry with quoins and voussoirs, a round-arched slit vent, a doorway with interrupted jambs, and a pitching hole. In front of the barn is a trough. | II |
| Guidestone opposite Cairn Croft; 53.87959°N 1.92398°W | | Mid to late 18th century | The guidestone stands at a road junction, and is inscribed with pointing hands indicating the directions to Skipton and to Keighley. | II |
| Guidestone, Ryecroft Road; 53.84404°N 1.90204°W | | Mid to late 18th century | The guidestone is by a road junction and has a square section. It is inscribed with pointing hands indicating the directions to Keighley, Halifax, Bingley and Hainworth. | II |
| High Hob Cote Farmhouse; 53.84125°N 1.97154°W | — | Mid to late 18th century | Two cottages and a house, later combined, the house dating from the 19th century. The building is in stone and has stone slate roofs with coped gables and shaped kneelers. There are two storeys, and the former cottages have shaped gutter brackets, and two doorways with plain surrounds and interrupted jambs, one of which is blocked. The house projects, and contains a similar doorway, also blocked. Some windows have single lights, and the others are mullioned, with some mullions removed. | II |
| Aqueduct over Morton Beck; 53.86694°N 1.84905°W | | c. 1770–73 | The aqueduct carries the Leeds and Liverpool Canal over Morton Beck. It is in stone and consists of a single segmental arch. The aqueduct has a string course, and a parapet on the side of the towpath. | II |
| Swine Lane Bridge; 53.87248°N 1.86529°W | | 1770s | The bridge carries Swine Lane over the Leeds and Liverpool Canal. It is in stone, and consists of a single round arch. The bridge has pilasters, rusticated voussoirs, a string course, and a plain parapet. | II |
| Barn, Bankhouse Farm; 53.86959°N 1.94175°W | — | Late 18th century | The barn is in millstone grit, with quoins, and a stone slate roof with a coped gable and kneeler on the right. It contains a segmental-ached cart entry with a quoined surround and voussoirs, and above it is a pitching hole. There are two doorways with plain surrounds, one blocked and the other converted into a window. In the left gable end is are dove holes with shelves, and in the right gable end are triangular-shaped vents. | II |
| Commercial Inn; 53.86524°N 1.90998°W | | Late 18th century | The public house is in stone on a plinth, and has a stone slate roof with a coped gable and a shaped kneeler on the right. There are three storeys and three bays. The central doorway has plinth blocks, a fanlight, and an entablature, and above it are blocked single-light windows. The outer bays contain three-light mullioned windows, the middle lights wider, in each floor. | II |
| Fountain Inn; 53.86516°N 1.91009°W | | Late 18th century | Two houses, later converted into a public house, the building is in rendered stone with a stone slate roof. There are three storeys and three bays. The windows are mullioned with two or three lights, the doorway has a plain surround and a fanlight, and a doorway to the left has been converted into a window. | II |
| Low Bridge; 53.86407°N 1.90458°W | | Late 18th century | The bridge carries Park Lane over the River Worth. It is in millstone grit, and consists of three segmental arches. The bridge has triangular cutwaters, buttresses connected by a band, a parapet with moulded coping, and at the northwest end is a large drum terminal. | II |
| Low Bridge Mill; 53.86425°N 1.90417°W | | Late 18th century | Most of the mill, now disused, dates from the 19th century. It is in millstone grit and has a hipped roof of stone slate and Welsh slate. The earlier part has three storeys and a basement, and ten bays, and the later part has two storeys and a basement and six bays. At the south end is a circular chimney on a square corniced base. | II |
| Original building, Low Mill; 53.86668°N 1.90182°W | | Late 18th century | The remaining part of the original textile mill in the town, and now derelict, it is in stone with a stone slate roof. There are three storeys and ten bays. In the ground floor is a round arch with voussoirs for housing the waterwheel. The other openings have been altered, and they include sash windows in the ground floor, casement windows in the upper floors, and a loading door in the top floor. | II* |
| Hainworth Farmhouse; 53.84832°N 1.91076°W | — | 1783 | The farmhouse, which incorporates earlier material, and was later divided, is in stone with quoins and a stone slate roof. The original doorway has a plain surround and a broken pediment containing the date and an inscription. There is a later doorway in a porch, and the windows are mullioned, with some mullions removed. | II |
| Guard House and barn 53.86814°N 1.92602°W | — | 1791 (probable) | A house and barn, later used as a church and presbytery, in stone with stone slate roofs and coped gables with kneelers. The house has quoins, two storeys, a central doorway with a pediment, and a single light window above. The other windows are mullioned, and in a lower part to the right is a bay window. The barn is at right angles on the left, it has a hipped roof, and contains large round relieving arches, a doorway with initials and a date above, a semicircular loft window, and pigeon holes. | II |
| Ponden Cotton Mill and chimney 53.83128°N 2.00352°W | | 1791 | The chimney was added to the cotton mill in about 1825. The mill is in millstone grit with a stone slate roof. There are three storeys and nine bays, and the windows are 20th-century casements. At the rear is a circular stone chimney about 40 feet (12 m) high. | II |
| Turkey Mill; 53.86162°N 1.95678°W | | 1797 | The mill was later extended, and is in gritstone, with a stone slate roof, and an H-shaped plan. The right range has three storeys and six bays, and contains a round-headed wheel arch, two lunettes, square windows, a taking-in door with interrupted jambs, and a truncated octagonal chimney. The main range has three storeys and 13 bays, coped gables with kneelers, and a bellcote on the left gable. It contains a round-arched entrance with a quoined surround in the ground floor. The middle floor has small square windows and a date plaque, and in the top floor are taller windows. The left range is free-standing, with two storeys. | II |
| 4B, 6, 7 and 9 Croft House Lane, Low Utley; 53.88262°N 1.91888°W | — | c. 1800 | A group of four back to back houses, they are in stone with quoins and a stone slate roof. There are two storeys, and each house has two bays. On the front of each house is a doorway, a single-light window and a two-light mullioned window in the ground floor, and two two-light windows in the upper floor. | II |
| 9, 11 and 13 Temple Street, Keighley; 53.86610°N 1.91064°W | — | Late 18th to early 19th century | A row of three shops in a terrace, they are in rendered stone, with a roof of concrete tiles. There are two storeys, and each shop has one bay. The openings have plain surrounds. In the ground floor are doorways and shop windows, and the upper floor contains mullioned windows. | II |
| 32–44 Oldfield Lane, Oldfield; 53.83640°N 1.99452°W | | Late 18th to early 19th century | A row of seven cottages in millstone grit with stone slate roofs. They have two storeys and one bay each. The doorways have gabled hoods on brackets, the windows are mullioned, and most cottages have a three-light window in the ground floor and two two-light windows in the upper floor. | II |
| Aireworth Mill; 53.87365°N 1.89093°W | | Late 18th to early 19th century | A former textile mill that was later extended, it is in stone and has roofs of stone slate and Welsh slate. The main range has three storeys, with 13 bays to the left and a taller six-bay range to the right. At the rear are loading bays and an embattled stair tower containing curved windows. In the right return is a clock in an architrave in the gable. There is an engine house, partly in brick, containing, a round-arched doorway with voussoirs, an impost band and an oculus with keystones, and a tall tapering octagonal chimney. | II |
| Guidestone, Park Lane; 53.85942°N 1.89831°W | | Late 18th to early 19th century | The guidestone is set into a wall by the roadside. It has a square section and is inscribed with a pointing hand indicating the direction to Halifax. | II |
| Spring Head House and Cottage; 53.83700°N 1.95694°W | — | Late 18th to early 19th century | A house, later divided, it is in stone with rusticated quoins, moulded string courses, and a hipped stone slate roof. There are two storeys and three bays. The house has a central doorway with engaged Tuscan columns, a fanlight, and an open pediment, and the cottage has an inserted doorway. There is one sash window, a blocked window, and three three-light windows with the central light higher. | II |
| Throstles Nest Farmhouse and Barn; 53.83549°N 2.02274°W | — | Late 18th to early 19th century | The farmhouse and attached barn are in millstone grit, with quoins and a stone slate roof. The house has two storeys and one bay, a porch to the right, and it contains mullioned windows. The barn is recessed on the right, and contains a segmental-arched cart door with a quoined surround and voussoirs, a doorway with interrupted jambs, and slit vents. | II |
| Turnpike gateway, Cliffe Castle; 53.87485°N 1.91401°W | — | Late 18th to early 19th century | The gateway has been moved from South Street, Keighley, it is in cast and wrought iron, and consists of a double gate with a pedestrian gate on the right. The gate piers have moulded rounded finials. | II |
| Eastwood House; 53.87305°N 1.90123°W | | 1819 | A stone house with two storeys, seven bays on the front, the middle five bays projecting under a pediment, and two bays on the sides. In the centre is a Doric portico, and the flanking windows are sashes. In the outer bays on the front the windows are tripartite, they are in recessed round-headed arches, and above are blocking courses with antefixae. | II |
| 6–16 Goose Eye, Laycock; 53.86185°N 1.95782°W | — | c.1822 | A row of six cottages in millstone grit with stone slate roofs. The row is canted to follow the curve of the road. There are two storeys, and each cottage has one bay. The windows are mullioned and some doorways have been converted into windows. | II |
| 23 and 25 Glen Lee Lane, Keighley; 53.85845°N 1.89759°W | — | Early 19th century | A pair of mirror-image cottages in millstone grit that have a stone slate roof with coped gables and shaped kneelers. There are two storeys, and each cottage has a doorway at the end, a two-light window in the ground floor, and a single-light and a two-light window in the upper floor. | II |
| 11 and 15 Goose Eye, Laycock; 53.86205°N 1.95764°W | — | Early 19th century | A row of five cottages, later combined into two dwellings, they are in stone with plain gutter brackets and a stone slate roof. There are two storeys and five bays, the left two bays higher. The windows are mullioned with three lights, and some doorways have been converted into two-light windows. | II |
| 22 Goose Eye, Laycock; 53.86145°N 1.95799°W | — | Early 19th century | A pair of cottages combined into one dwelling, it is in stone with a stone slate roof. There are two storeys and two bays. At the ends are two doorways with plain surrounds, and the windows are mullioned, with three lights. | II |
| 30, 32 and 34 Goose Eye, Laycock; 53.86120°N 1.95887°W | — | Early 19th century | A worsted mill, later converted into three houses. The building is in millstone grit, with quoins and a stone slate roof. There are three storeys, a main block of seven bays, a two-bay extension to the right, and a taller extension to the left. The windows are sashes with plain surrounds. | II |
| 15 Main Street, Laycock, and barn 53.86452°N 1.95360°W | — | Early 19th century | The house and attached barn are in stone with quoins, and a stone slate roof with coped gables and kneelers. The house has two storeys, a doorway with a plain surround, and mullioned windows, with some mullions removed. In the rear of the barn is a segmental-arched cart entry and two small round-headed windows. | II |
| 14–20 Colne Road, Oakworth; 53.84607°N 1.95502°W | | Early 19th century | A row of four cottages in millstone grit with a stone slate roof and a coped gable to the right. There are two storeys, and each cottage has one bay. In each cottage is a doorway to the right, and a three-light mullioned window in each floor. | II |
| Goose Eye Bridge; 53.86131°N 1.95799°W | — | Early 19th century | The bridge carries a road over North Beck. It is in millstone grit, and consists of a single segmental arch. The bridge has voussoirs, a parapet with rounded and grooved coping, and swept abutments. | II |
| Mill Building, Low Mills; 53.86711°N 1.90123°W | | Early 19th century | The textile mill, which was later expanded, is in stone on a plinth, with quoins sill bands, bracketed eaves, and a slate roof. There are three storeys and a front of 39 bays. There are two gabled sections of two or three bays. To the south of the left gabled section, the ground floor windows are round-headed with moulded voussoirs, keystones and impost bands. The windows in the middle floor have segmental heads, and most of the windows in the top floor are paired. Elsewhere the windows are of varied types, and between the gabled sections is a cart entry. | II |
| Morton Hall; 53.87962°N 1.84825°W | — | Early 19th century | A house that was converted into flats in about 1985, it is in stone with corner pilasters, a modillion cornice, and a hipped roof. There are two storeys, a symmetrical front of three bays, the middle bay projecting slightly, flanking wings, each with one storey and two bays, and a rear wing. Steps lead up to a central porch that has paired Roman Doric columns, a frieze with triglyphs, and a modillioned cornice. This is flanked by canted bay windows, and the other windows are casements. | II |
| Old Side; 53.87677°N 1.84651°W | — | Early 19th century | A stone house with a stone slate roof. There is a central block with three bays, the ground floor projecting, a two-bay extension to the right, and on the left is a three-storey three-bay block with a hipped roof. The two main doorways have Gibbs surrounds, and the doorway in the central block is flanked by bow windows. The other windows are sashes, and in the left block are two dormers. | II |
| The Knowle; 53.85886°N 1.91249°W | — | Early 19th century | A stone house with a moulded cornice and a hipped stone slate roof. There are two storeys and a symmetrical front of three bays. In the centre is a porch with paired Doric columns, a frieze and a pediment, and the door has a fanlight. This is flanked by two-storey canted bay windows with Doric half-columns. In the garden front is a two-storey bow window. | II |
| Gate piers, The Knowle; 53.85911°N 1.91200°W | — | Early 19th century | There is a pair of gate piers flanking the two entrances to the grounds. The piers are in stone, they are cylindrical, and each has a moulded cap and an acorn finial. | II |
| Who's Farmhouse, cottage and barn 53.87172°N 1.95669°W | — | Early 19th century | The farmhouse, cottage and barn are in one range, they are in stone, and have a stone slate roof with coped gables and kneelers, and two storeys. The house and cottage each has a doorway with interrupted jambs and mullioned windows. The barn is to the left and has three bays and an outshut. It contains a central cart doorway with a quoined surround and voussoirs, a mullioned window and slit vents. | II |
| 19 and 21 Temple Street, Keighley; 53.86630°N 1.91063°W | — | Early to mid 19th century | Three houses in a terrace, later combined into two, they are in stone with a bracketed eaves cornice above moulding, and a stone slate roof. There are two storeys and four bays. The doorways have fanlights and corniced hoods on consoles, and the windows are sashes. | II |
| 1–47 Bridge Street, Oakworth; 53.84412°N 1.95817°W | | Early to mid 19th century | A long row of cottages of different builds, stepped up a hill, some originally back to back houses, they are in stone with stone slate roofs. Nos. 1–37 have two storeys and the other cottages have three; No. 39 also has a cellar. Most of the windows are mullioned, with some mullions removed. Between Nos. 41 and 43 is a segmental-headed cart entrance with interrupted jambs, voussoirs, and a keystone. | II |
| 120–124 Commercial Street, Oakworth; 53.84571°N 1.95925°W | — | Early to mid 19th century | A row of three stone houses with a stone slate roof and two storeys. Each house has a doorway with a plain surround, and mullioned windows, with a two-light window in the ground floor and a three-light window above. | II |
| Eden House; 53.86674°N 1.91084°W | — | Early to mid 19th century | A stone house that has a stone slate roof with kneelers. There are two storeys and a symmetrical front of three bays. Steps lead up to a central doorway that has panelled pilasters, a fanlight, and a round arched head with archivolts and a keystone. The windows are sashes, and at the rear is a round-arched stair window. | II |
| Milepost, Hob Cote Lane; 53.84313°N 1.96427°W | — | Early to mid 19th century | The milepost is on the north side of the lane, and is in cast iron. It consists of two pieces of iron bolted together to make a post with a triangular section and a pyramidal top. The post is inscribed with pointing hands and the distances to Keighley and to Colne. | II |
| Milepost, Keighley Road; 53.84729°N 1.94570°W | | Early to mid 19th century | The milepost is on the northwest side of the road, and is in cast iron. It consists of two pieces of iron bolted together to make a post with a triangular section and a pyramidal top. The post is inscribed with pointing hands and the distances to Keighley and to Colne. | II |
| Wall, gates and piers, Keighley Road; 53.84570°N 1.94864°W | — | Early to mid 19th century | On the south side of the road, and flanking an entrance are square stone gate piers, each on a plinth, and containing a panel with a sunk cross, a pilaster on the inner side, and an entablature with a cornice rising to a semicircle on each side. The gates are in cast and wrought iron and are decorative. At the sides of the gate piers, coped walls run along the road, and incorporate nine piers on each side. Each pier contains two panels, an entablature with a pyramidal panel in the frieze, and a flat capstone. | II |
| Wall, gates and piers, Holden Park; 53.84562°N 1.94858°W | | Early to mid 19th century | On the north side of the road, and flanking the entrance to the park, are square stone gate piers, each on a plinth, and containing a panel with a sunk cross, above which is a panel with an inscribed bronze plaque, an entablature with a cornice rising to a semicircle on each side, and surmounted by a bronze statue. Flanking the piers are pedestrian archways with moulded surrounds. Walls on each side ramp down, run along the road and incorporate piers, each on a plinth and containing two panels, an entablature with a pyramidal panel in the frieze, and a stepped capstone. | II |
| Rose Cottage; 53.85831°N 1.92820°W | — | Early to mid 19th century | A pair of stone cottages that have a coped gable and shaped kneelers on the left. There are two storeys, each cottage has one bay, and there is a three-light mullioned window in each floor. | II |
| Presbytery, St Anne's Church; 53.86988°N 1.91035°W | — | 1838 | The presbytery is in stone with a stone slate roof, and is in Gothic style. There are two storeys and an attic. The right part projects and is gabled, and in the left part the ground floor and the central porch project. The windows have pointed arches. | II |
| St Anne's Church; 53.87003°N 1.91032°W | | 1840 | The church was designed by A. W. N. Pugin, and in 1906–07 it was reorientated and an aisle and a new chancel were added. It is built in stone, and consists of a nave, a narthex converted from the original chancel, a south aisle, and a chancel. The windows are lancets. | II |
| St John's Church, Ingrow; 53.85527°N 1.91621°W | | 1841–43 | A vestry was added to the church, which is in Neo-Norman style, in 1884. It is built in stone with slate roofs, and consists of a nave, north and south aisles, a chancel with an apse, a vestry, and a west tower. The tower has four stages, clasping pilasters rising to octagonal corner turrets, a south doorway, clock faces, and an embattled parapet. The windows are round-headed lancets. | II |
| East Morton Congregational Church and Sunday School; 53.87308°N 1.85269°W | | 1845 | The church is in sandstone on a plinth, with quoins, a stone slate roof, and one storey. The entrance front has five bays, the middle three bays projecting slightly under a pediment, and flanked by channelled quoined piers. Steps lead up to the central doorway which has pilasters and an entablature, and above it is a frieze and a moulded cornice. The windows on the front are flat-headed with aprons, along the sides they are round-headed, and the Sunday school is at the rear. | II |
| Christ Church, Oakworth; 53.84582°N 1.95441°W | | 1845–46 | The church is in sandstone with a Welsh slate roof, and is in Early English style. It consists of a nave, a south porch, a chancel, a south vestry, and a west tower. The tower has four stages, angle buttresses, clock faces, a corbelled cornice, and a parapet. The windows are lancets with hood moulds. | II |
| Mosque; 53.86671°N 1.91052°W | | 1845–46 | Originally a Methodist church, later converted into a mosque, it is in stone with rusticated quoins, a top cornice, and a Westmorland slate roof. There are two storeys, a symmetrical front of four bays, and six bays along the sides. In each outer bay is a porch with paired Tuscan columns, a frieze, and a cornice, and in the upper floor above it are paired pilasters flanking the windows. The windows on the front and along the sides are round-headed. | II |
| Keighley Shared Church; 53.86511°N 1.90916°W | | 1846–48 | Formerly St Andrew's Church, it was designed by R. D. Chantrell in Perpendicular style. The church is built in stone with a stone slate roof, and consists of a nave with a clerestory, north and south aisles, a south porch, chancels with transepts, a south vestry, and a west tower. The tower has four stages, diagonal buttresses, a west doorway, a four-light west window, clock faces, gargoyles, and a parapet with crocketed pinnacles. The east window has five lights. | II |
| Oaklands Private Chapel of Rest; 53.87149°N 1.90993°W | | Mid 19th century | A stone house on a plinth, with a moulded modillion cornice and a grey slate roof, hipped over the outer bays. There are two storeys, a double-depth plan and a front of three bays, the middle bay recessed. In the centre is an arched doorway with a fanlight, flanked by colonnettes carrying a corbelled balustrade. Above it is a round-arched window with an archivolt, keystone, and imposts. To the left of the doorway is a canted bay window, the two central lights round-headed with a floriated colonnette between them, and above is a hood mould, a moulded cornice and a fretted parapet. In the right bay is a three-light window with rounded lights, and in the top floor are two-light windows that have mullions with moulded capitals. | II |
| Building, Prospect Mill; 53.85593°N 1.91478°W | | Mid 19th century | The mill building, later used for other purposes, is in stone with a moulded plinth band, and a hipped Westmorland slate roof. There is one storey and a basement, and a front of four bays. Between the bays are rusticated pilasters, and above is an entablature, a dentilled cornice, and a blocking course. The openings are round-arched with architraves, keystones and imposts, and they contain a doorway in the left bay, and sash windows in the other bays. | II |
| Springfield; 53.87168°N 1.90990°W | — | Mid 19th century | The house, later used for other purposes, is in restrained Italianate style. It is in stone with string courses, an eaves cornice, and a grey slate roof. There are two storeys and a symmetrical front of five bays, the middle bay recessed. The central doorway has Doric half-columns, a fanlight and an entablature. The windows have architraves and bracketed sills, those in the ground floor also have cornices. | II |
| Former Baptist Chapel; 53.86867°N 1.91047°W | | 1863 | The former chapel is in rusticated stone, with quoins and a stone slate roof, and is in Romanesque style. There are two storeys and a basement, and a front of three bays. The middle bay is the largest, it projects forward, and has a coped gable with a machicolated eaves course and a finial, and contains stepped arcading. In the basement are four segmental-headed windows, the ground floor contains four round-arched windows with columns between, and in the upper floor is a complex tripartite window. The outer bays contain doorways in round arches with decoration in the tympani, over which are paired round-arched windows. | II |
| Walls, piers and railings, Former Baptist Chapel; 53.86854°N 1.91048°W | — | Mid to late 19th century | In front of the basement area are dwarf coped stone walls stepped up the slope carrying cast iron railings with ornamental finials. There are three pairs of square stone piers and one end pier, all with pyramidal caps. One pier is surmounted by a cast iron lamp standard with a twisted column. | II |
| Dalton Mills and associated structures 53.86889°N 1.89540°W | | 1866 | A complex of mill buildings around a central courtyard, which were later extended, they are in sandstone with various roofing materials. The mill buildings are Tower Mill, which has four storeys, fronts of nine and seven bays, corner turrets with pyramidal roofs, and a taller tower with clock faces. Genappe Mill is a long building with three storeys, 38 bays long and ten bays wide, and with lantern towers. New Mill runs parallel to Genappe Mill, and has three storeys and 33 bays. The detached chimney is in a square tower that has six stages rising to a balcony, and is then narrower, rising higher. The other buildings include two engine houses and a long shed. The yard is paved with stone setts. | II* |
| Keighley Drill Hall; 53.86889°N 1.90712°W | | 1867 | The drill hall was extended in 1876 and 1897, it is built in limestone with sandstone dressings, and has a Welsh slate roof with red ridge tiles. It consists of an administrative block, with the drill hall at right angles at the rear, and the later extension including a gymnasium parallel to the drill hall. The administrative block has two storeys and five bays, it has a crow-stepped east gable containing an oculus with keystones, and contains sash windows with segmental heads. The drill hall has blind sides and coped gables. The extension has a crow-stepped south gable, and contains a segmental-arched vehicle entrance. | II |
| Oakworth railway station 53.84140°N 1.94202°W | | 1867 | The railway station, which was enlarged in about 1910, is on the Keighley and Worth Valley Railway. It is in stone with a modillion cornice, a slate roof, and a single storey. The central section is gabled, and contains two round-arched windows with mouldings, keystones, and imposts. The range to the left has three similar openings, the central one a doorway. To the right is a later extension. | II |
| Public Baths; 53.86839°N 1.91112°W | — | 1867–76 | The public baths were designed by Lockwood and Mawson, and were extended to the right in 1914. The building is in rusticated stone, and the roof is in Welsh slate. The original part has two storeys and five gables, two large and three smaller, with finials. There are two doorways with pointed heads, flanked by square piers with acanthus-leaf capitals, and have moulded arches, roundels in the spandrels and acanthus-leaf cornices. The windows have quoined surrounds and colonnettes with acanthus-leaf cornices. In the gables the windows are round with multi-foiled lights and pointed hood moulds. The extension has a single storey and three bays, the right bay canted on the corner and with a spire. The doorway has a pointed arch and above it is a gable containing a coat of arms. | II |
| Porter's Lodge, Dalton Mills; 53.86945°N 1.89376°W | — | 1872 (probable) | The porter's lodge is in stone with a rusticated ground floor. There are two storeys with end projections, and it contains small segmental-headed windows. | II |
| Twin fountains, Cliffe Castle; 53.87470°N 1.91190°W | | 1870s | The two fountains in the grounds of the museum are similar. They are in stone, and each has a circular basin containing a rock base carrying a fluted bowl. Above this is a smaller bowl, with entwined dolphins on the stem, and a boy and a swan on the top. | II |
| Butterfield Family Chapel and Vault; 53.88140°N 1.91495°W | | c. 1875 | The chapel which stands on a vault in Utley Cemetery, is in sandstone, and in Gothic Revival style. It has a chamfered plinth and corner buttresses with granite colonnettes. The doorway is square and above it is a heraldic device with an inscription, a crocketted niche, and a gable with an apex cross. Behind is a pillar with a carved figure on each side under a canopy, above which are colonnettes and a pyramidal top. | II |
| Police station 53.86762°N 1.90987°W | — | Late 19th century | The police station is on a corner site, it is in stone on a plinth, the ground floor is rusticated, it has a sill band, a dentilled eaves cornice and a hipped roof. There are two storeys, and sides of three bays. The ground floor windows have round-arched heads, quoined surrounds, and an impost band, and the windows in the upper floor have flat heads, architraves and cornices. | II |
| Cliffe Castle; 53.87513°N 1.91386°W | | 1875–78 | A large house that was converted into a museum in 1956–59, it is in stone and has two storeys, and an irregular plan. The windows are either mullioned and transomed, or have single lights. At the entrance is an embattled porte-cochère with angle buttresses and a corbelled parapet. Behind it is a four-storey tower, which contains oriel windows, it is flanked by two-storey bay windows, and to the left is a conservatory. Behind this are rooms, including a single-storey gabled music room with a canted end. | II |
| Lodge and entrance, Cliffe Castle; 53.87329°N 1.90975°W | | 1875–78 (probable) | At the entrance to the drive is a stone arch with a moulded surround and a pointed head, flanked by large octagonal piers with embattled parapets, surmounted by embattled turrets. Above the arch is an embattled parapet containing a cartouche in a panel. The main arch is flanked by smaller pointed archways. To the left is a single-storey lodge containing a Tudor arched doorway, bay windows, and embattled parapets. | II |
| Jean Junction; 53.86552°N 1.91041°W | — | 1876 | A club, later a shop and warehouse, it was refronted in about 1900. The building is in stone and has a slate roof with coped gables. There are three storeys, three bays on the front, a curved single-storey two-bay extension to the right, and sides of nine bays. In the ground floor is a shop front with a central pedimented doorway, flanking pilasters with ornately carved capitals, and an entablature with a fascia board. In the extension is a shop front, and in the right bay are two circular windows. The middle floor contains three windows and four short Doric columns on high bases, above which is an entablature on brackets. In the top floor are three windows, similar columns, and carved figures, and at the top is a pediment containing an oculus. On the right return is a semi-octagonal protrusion with a tile roof, segmental-arched windows, and a loft door. | II |
| Slack Lane Baptist Church; 53.85095°N 1.95838°W | | 1879 | The church is in sandstone on a plinth, with a string course, two storeys, a gabled pedimented front of three bays, and five bays along the sides. The pediment has a dentilled cornice and a datestone in the tympanum. Steps lead up to a central entrance that has pilasters and engaged Doric columns with fluted capitals, and an entablature with a dentilled cornice. The doorway has a moulded lintel a round-arched fanlight, a moulded keystone, and fluted imposts. The windows have round heads, in the ground floor with panelled spandrels, and in the upper floor with a sill band on consoles. | II |
| Gates and gatepiers, Slack Lane Baptist Church; 53.85114°N 1.95802°W | — | 1879 | Flanking the entrance to the churchyard are stone gate piers. Each pier has a chamfered plinth, and an entablature with a panelled frieze and a modillion cornice. The gates are in wrought iron, and are decorative. | II |
| Water tower, Keighley railway station 53.86710°N 1.90060°W | | 1883 (probable) | The water tower on the platform of the railway station is in stone on a plinth, with a modillioned cornice, and surmounted by a cast iron water tank. There are two bays on the front and one on the sides. In the middle and at the sides are giant pilasters, and the tops of the bays are dentilled. The left bay contains a door with a fanlight and in the right bay is a multi-paned window; both have segmental heads. The tank has a chamfered plinth, and each section contains a decorative panel. | II |
| Keighley Junction Signal Box; 53.86820°N 1.90243°W | | 1884 | The signal box was built for the Midland Railway, it is in timber, the upper storey is glazed, and it has a hipped Welsh slate roof with finials. There are two storeys, sides of one and two bays, and a rear outshut. In the ground floor is a doorway, and external steps lead up to a doorway in the upper floor. The windows are sliding sashes. | II |
| Keighley railway station 53.86809°N 1.90188°W | | 1885 | A canopy runs along the front of the entrance range, and in the right gable end is a datestone. The interior contains period furnishings, including cast iron lamp posts, glass and cast iron canopies, an eight-columned arcade, and an engine water-filling pump. | II |
| Laurel Mount; 53.87159°N 1.91814°W | — | 1885 | A large house later used for other purposes, it is in stone on a plinth, and has a hipped grey slate roof with coped gables and finials. There are two storeys and attics, and four bays, the outer bays gabled. Above the middle two bays is a balustrade. Steps lead up to the doorway that has a moulded surround with Tuscan colonnettes, and a cartouche above. The windows are sashes, in the outer bays they are tripartite, and those in the upper floor have swan-neck pediments. At the rear is a round-arched stair window with two lights, and in the right return is a two-storey bow window. | II |
| Steps, wall, balustrade and archway, Laurel Mount; 53.87147°N 1.91796°W | — | 1885 | In the garden are three flights of steps, and a terrace wall that contains a segmental-headed niche with voussoirs, and a keystone with a lion's head above. The steps and wall have a balustrade with panelled angle piers and ball finials. There is also an archway with a moulded surround and buttresses, surmounted by a griffin, and containing a wrought iron gate. | II |
| Hattersley Crescent; 53.86495°N 1.91004°W | | 1890 | A curved terrace of ten shops with offices above, in stone with pilasters, bracketed eaves, and a hipped slate roof. There are three storeys, and in the ground floor are original shop fronts, with wooden pilasters, brackets, and fascia boards. Near the centre is a carriage entrance with a bracketed lintel, and to its left is an office doorway with a fanlight, and a broken swan-neck pediment with a festoon. Above this doorway is a window with a segmental pediment containing the name of the crescent. The windows in the upper two floors are sashes, those in the middle floor with dentilled cornices. At the ends of the crescent and in the centre are two-storey bow windows, and between them are two bays containing two-storey canted bay windows with a pediment over the lower window. | II |
| National Westminster Bank; 53.86698°N 1.90991°W | | 1892 | The bank, on a corner site, is in stone with rusticated pilasters, a corbelled modillioned cornice, a fretted parapet, and a grey slate roof. There are three storeys, three bays on North Street, seven on Russell Street, and an angled bay on the corner. The entrance in the corner bay has a round-arched doorway with an architrave, pilasters, and a moulded segmental pediment on consoles. At the top of the bay is a round-headed window with an archivolt, keystone, and imposts, flanked by short panelled piers. The windows in the ground floor have segmental heads and keystones, in the middle floor they have flat heads, and the top floor windows are round-headed, apart from three bays in Russell Street. The upper floor windows, apart from in these bays, are separated by giant Ionic pilasters. | II |
| Council Offices; 53.86768°N 1.90842°W | | 1893 | The building is on a curved corner site, and is in stone on a chamfered plinth, with quoins, a moulded band and eaves, and a slate roof with terracotta ridge tiles. There are two storeys and a high basement. The main doorway has pilasters, a carved frieze, and a double fanlight with a decorative surround, above which is a shell hood with flanking ball finials, and an oculus with keystones. The curved bay on the corner contains in the upper floor a three-light oriel window, the central light with a round head, and a four-part fanlight. Above this is a carved frieze and a gabled pediment containing an inscription and flanked by ball finials. The windows are two or three-light cross casements with sills on brackets. | II |
| Russell Chambers; 53.86667°N 1.90987°W | | 1893 | An office block on a corner site, it is in stone with panelled pilasters between the bays, a modillioned cornice, and a green slate roof. There are three storeys, six bays on North Street, three on Russell Street, and a curved bay on the corner. Between the lower two floors is a blind arcade, and between the upper two floors is a carved frieze. In the corner bay is another entrance, and the three bays on each side of it have stilted-arched windows with moulded surrounds and colonnettes, and in the end bays on North Street is a shop front. The windows in the middle floor are paired and round-headed, and in the top floor they are tripartite with flat heads. The entrance in North Street has clustered columns, leaf capitals, and a gabled pediment with carving in the tympanum. At the top of the bay is a gabled attic containing a Venetian window, and surmounting the corner bay is a round turret and a dome with an iron finial. | II |
| The Temperance Institute; 53.86868°N 1.90986°W | | 1896 | The former temperance institute, later converted for other uses, is on a corner site, and is in stone, with a moulded string course, and a modillion eaves cornice. There are three storeys, six bays on North Street, six on Albert Street, and an angled bay on the corner. On this corner is a polygonal tower with a wooden lantern and a polygonal dome with an iron weathervane and a lead roof. On North Street, in the ground floor are five segmental arches, one containing an entrance, the others with windows. In the right bay is a round-ached doorway with a moulded surround and consoles carrying an entablature with a frieze of swags and putti flanking an inscribed plaque. At the top of the bay is a dated segmental broken pediment. In the middle floor on both fronts, the windows have cornices, and in the top floor they are round-headed. In Albert Street, steps lead up to an entrance with attached Ionic columns and a moulded round arch, above which is an inscribed frieze. | II |
| Whinburn Lodge, Stable Block and Coach House; 53.88024°N 1.92772°W | — | 1897 | A house that was considerably extended in 1912–13 by Simpson and Ayrton in Arts and Crafts style. It is in stone and has a stone slate roof with coped gables, three storeys, and an irregular plan. The additions include a canted bay, a canted porch, a baronial hall at right angles and a tower. The tower has four storeys and buttresses, and is surmounted by irregular battlements and corner turrets. The windows vary, and include mullioned windows, cross casements, and an oriel window, and the doorways have four-centred arched heads. At the rear is a stable wing and a coach house at right angles forming an L-shaped plan. | II |
| Arcade Chambers; 53.86644°N 1.90989°W | | 1898 | A group of shops and offices in stone with a slate roof. There are three storeys and seven bays. In the centre is a round-arched doorway with decorative spandrels and a frieze, and in the top floor above it is an oriel window. Flanking the doorway in the ground floor are shop fronts, including four columns with marble veneer. The upper floors contain mullioned and transomed windows with a decorative panel above each window. The bays are separated by Corinthian pilasters carrying an entablature with a decorative frieze and a moulded cornice. Over the middle three bays is a shaped gable with finials, flanked by balustrades. | II |
| 4–80 Cavendish Street, Keighley; 53.86808°N 1.90546°W | | 1899 | A row of shops and offices that were extended to consist of a total of 38 units. They are in stone with stone slate roofs, three storeys and attics, and most shops have a single bay. In the ground floor are shop fronts with glass-roofed canopies, in the upper floors are three-light windows, and some shops have dormers. At intervals, some of the shops have gables, some of them pedimented, and others with segmental heads. At the east end is a combined chimney stack and gable flanked by ball finials, at the west end is an octagonal cupola with a short spire, and other features include canted oriel windows. | II |
| Royal Arcade and Crown Buildings, Fleece Street; 53.86634°N 1.90567°W | | 1899 | Shops, a shopping arcade and offices, they are in stone with moulded bands, pilasters with carved capitals, moulded eaves, a parapet with ball finials and a slate roof. There are three storeys and eight bays. In the ground floor are shop fronts, a carriage entrance, entrances to the offices, and a round-arched arcade entrance with a keystone and an inscribed panel. The windows are sashes, in the middle floor they have shouldered surrounds, and in the top floor they are flat-headed with hoods on brackets. | II |
| Royal Arcade and Crown Buildings, Low Street; 53.86624°N 1.90585°W | | 1899 | Shops, a shopping arcade and offices, they are in stone with moulded bands, pilasters with carved capitals, moulded eaves, an inscribed parapet with ball finials and a slate roof. There are three storeys and seven bays, and three further bays to the left from an earlier building. In the ground floor are shop fronts, and a round-arched arcade entrance with a keystone and an inscribed panel. The windows are sashes, in the middle floor they have shouldered surrounds, and in the top floor they are flat-headed with hoods on brackets. In the centre the upper floors contain a two-storey bay window surmounted by a dormer. On the right corner is a similar bay window with an octagonal cupola. | II |
| Barclays Bank; 53.86737°N 1.90990°W | | c. 1900 | The bank is in Italianate style, and is built in stone on a plinth, the ground floor is rusticated, and it has a cornice, a modillion eaves cornice, and a blocking course stepped up in the centre. There are two storeys, four bays on the front and three on the sides. In the ground floor, the openings have round-arched heads and an impost band. The upper floor has rusticated quoins, and contains segmental-headed windows with moulded surrounds and eyebrow pediments on brackets. | II |
| Town Hall; 53.86744°N 1.90898°W | | 1900–01 | The town hall is in stone on a plinth, with pilasters between the bays, cornices and panels with Art Nouveau carving between the floors, and a Westmorland slate roof. There are four storeys, a front of three bays, and an angled bay on the corner. In the ground floor are three windows and a doorway on the right, all with round-arched heads, moulded lintels, and keystones. Above the doorway is a balustrade on consoles. The first floor contains segmental-arched windows with architraves and impost bands. In the corner bay is an oriel window with a floriated base, and above it is a cornice and a balustrade. The top floors contain cross windows and a Venetian window, and above them is a parapet with pilasters, surmounted by ball and urn finials. Over the corner bay is a shaped pediment with a finial. In the left return are three bays similar to those on the front, then eight bays containing windows with chamfered lintels and mullions. | II |
| Public Library; 53.86822°N 1.90988°W | | 1902 | The public library is in stone and in Arts and Crafts style. There are two storeys, seven bays, the outer bays gabled, and a larger gabled bay on the right; all the gables are dentilled. The entrance has a round arch with carvings in the spandrels. In the ground floor are mullioned and transomed windows, the centre lights are round-headed, and between the windows are pilasters. In the upper floor are square windows set diagonally, and on the roof is a dome set on columns with open pediments. | II |
| Knowle Mill; 53.85931°N 1.91033°W | | 1906 | The mill, later used for other purposes, was extended in 1926. It is in gritstone with blue slate roofs, four storeys and basements. The first stage is 17 bays long and six bays deep, and the second stage to the right has 19 bays. The entrances are in the middle three bays, and are surmounted by a dentilled parapet containing the name of the mill. At the rear are weaving sheds with a trapezoidal plan, one storey and a basement. Also at the rear are the engine house, the boiler house and the chimney. The chimney is in red brick, and is tapering, with a moulded cornice. At the front of the mill is an office building, and a two-storey red brick joiners' shop. | II |
| Lodge and gates, Whinburn Lodge; 53.88030°N 1.92569°W | — | 1912 | The lodge and gates were designed by Simpson and Ayrton. The lodge is in stone on a chamfered plinth, and has a stone slate roof, two storeys and an L-shaped plan. The front facing the drive has a two-storey bow window with a curved parapet, and contains mullioned windows, a swagged frieze and a moulded band. In the angle is a porch with round-headed rusticated arches on Doric columns, and with a ramped parapet. In the front facing the road is a cross casement window with a moulded pediment. At the entrance to the drive are two gate piers, each with a moulded base, pilasters, a pulvinated frieze and a moulded cap. On the top is an openwork finial surmounted by a ball. | II |
| K1 Telephone Kiosk, Newsholme Dean; 53.85988°N 1.97211°W | | 1922 | The K1 telephone kiosk was moved to its present site adjacent to a weir on Dean Beck, and used for other purposes in the mid-20th century. It is in pre-cast concrete on a metal frame, and has a timber door. The kiosk stands on a concrete base, and has a pyramidal roof, a cornice, and a ball finial. | II |
| Upper Garden Pavilion, Whinburn; 53.87978°N 1.92700°W | — | 1922–23 | The garden pavilion was designed by John Simpson and Maxwell Ayrton and has Arts and Crafts features. It is in stone, built on two levels, and has a pyramidal stone slate roof. The upper level is reached by external stone steps. The entrance is arched, and in each of the other fronts is a rectangular window. In the lower level is a shallow recess containing the remains of a painted frieze. | II |
| Keighley War Memorial; 53.86791°N 1.90907°W | | 1924 | The war memorial is in Town Hall Square, and contains statues by Henry Charles Fehr. It is in sandstone, and consists of a tall obelisk on a two-tier pedestal and a base of three steps. On the top is a bronze statue of Victory holding a laurel wreath and a palm branch. By the sides of the obelisk are two more bronze statues, depicting a seaman and an infantryman. On the north and south fronts are bronze panels in stone frames, with wreaths, the north panel with inscriptions, and the south panel with a coat of arms. On the pedestal are later inscribed stone panels. | II* |
| K6 Telephone Kiosk, Goose Eye; 53.86172°N 1.95774°W | — | 1935 | The telephone kiosk to the south of No. 16 Goose Eye is of the K6 type, designed by Giles Gilbert Scott. Constructed in cast iron with a square plan and a dome, it has unperforated crowns in the top panels. | II |
| K6 Telephone Kiosk, Hainworth; 53.84805°N 1.91026°W | — | 1935 | The telephone kiosk to the southeast of Rose Cottage is of the K6 type, designed by Giles Gilbert Scott. Constructed in cast iron with a square plan and a dome, it has unperforated crowns in the top panels. | II |
| Clapper bridge 53.86047°N 1.97329°W | | Unknown | The clapper bridge crosses Dean Beck. It is in millstone grit and consists of two boulders supporting a central stone that is about 2.5 metres (8 ft 2 in) long. | II |
| Cross built into wall, Laycock; 53.86585°N 1.95139°W | | Unknown | The cross is in millstone grit, and is built into a wall by the side of a road. It is about 75 centimetres (30 in) high and 60 centimetres (24 in) wide, and its purpose is uncertain. | II |
| Footbridge near Rag Mill; 53.86097°N 1.95923°W | | Unknown | The footbridge crosses North Beck, and is in millstone grit. The piers consist of massive stone blocks, and between them are cross-pieces in stone, one of which has been replaced by a steel girder. | II |
| Limekiln near Elam Grange; 53.88494°N 1.90398°W | — | Unknown | The limekiln near the Leeds and Liverpool Canal and to the north of Elam Grange is in stone and is set into a bank of earth. It contains a large round-arched opening. | II |
| Packhorse bridge, Lumb Foot; 53.83426°N 1.97842°W | | Unknown | The former packhorse bridge carries a footpath over the River Worth. It is in stone and consists of a single arch with a span of about 7.5 metres (25 ft). The bridge has a parapet with massive copings and an iron handrail. | II |
| Packhorse bridge, Newsholme Dean; 53.86046°N 1.97338°W | | Unknown | The former packhorse bridge carries a footpath over Dean Beck. It is in stone and consists of a single arch. The bridge has voussoirs and a plain parapet. | II |
