= East Riddlesden Hall =

Historic house museum in West Yorkshire, England

Coordinates: 53.87471°N 1.88118°W

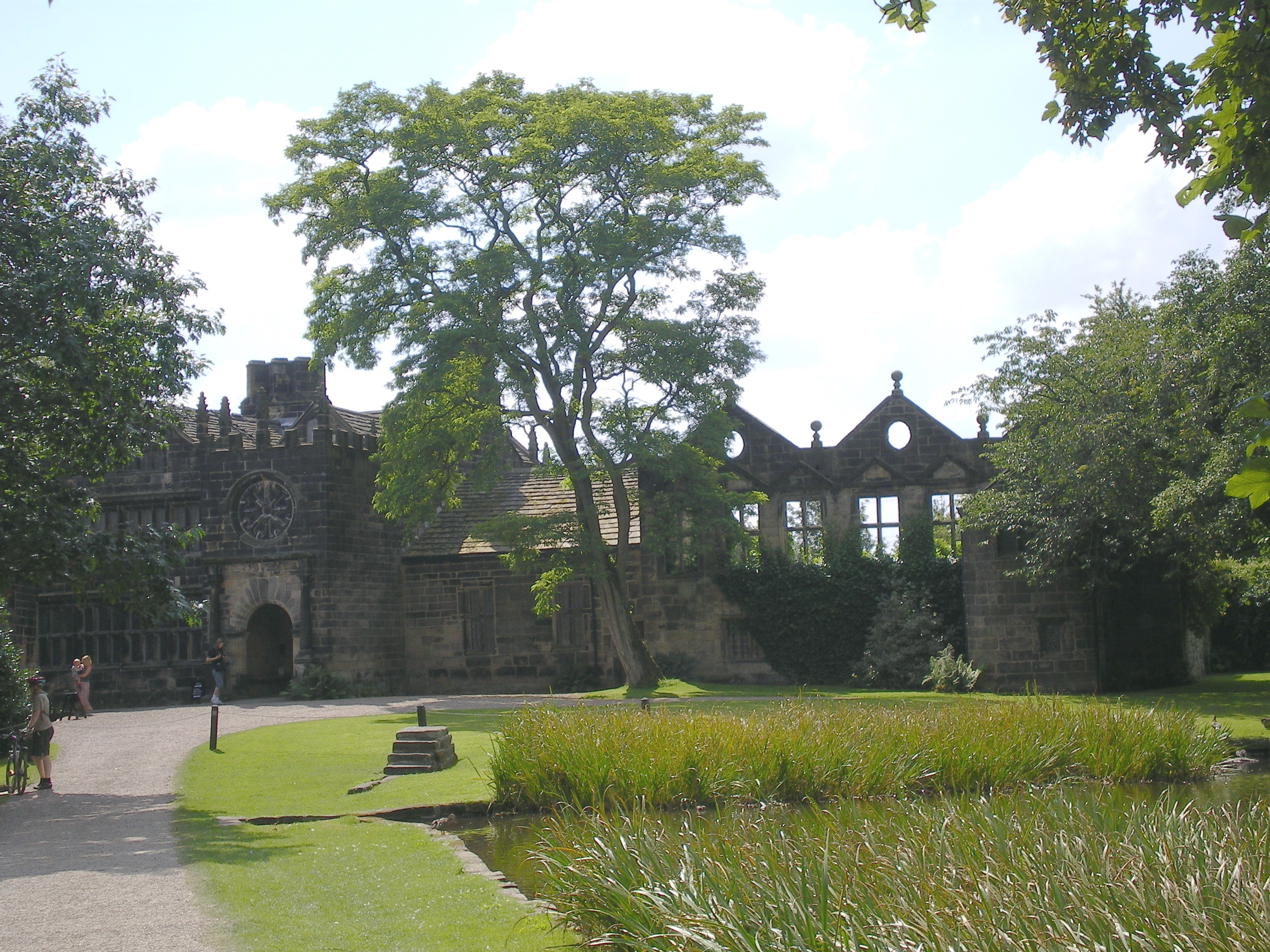
A view of the rear entrance (including rose window) of the property

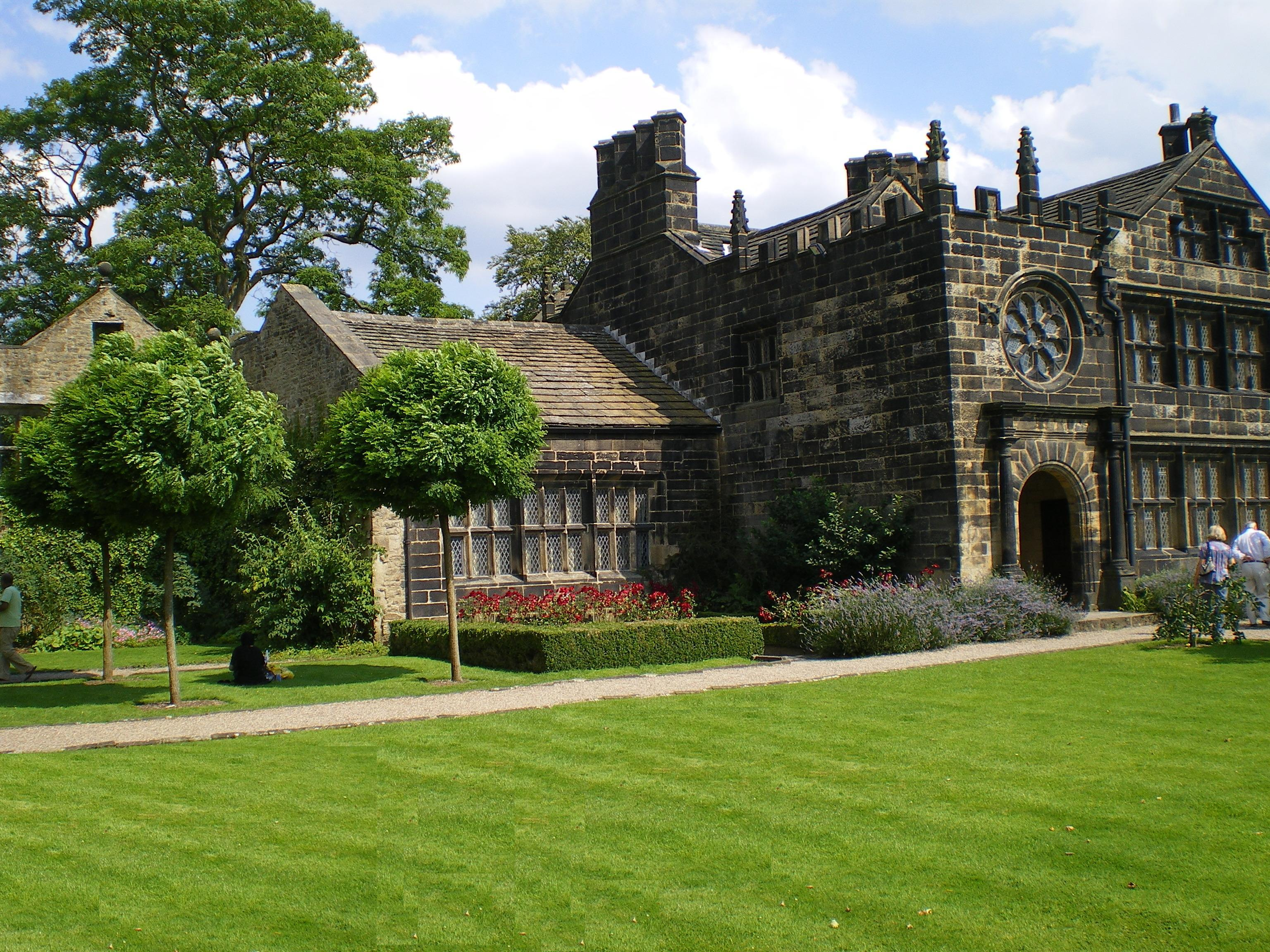
A view of the main entrance (including rose window) of the property

East Riddlesden Hall is a 17th-century manor house in Keighley, West Yorkshire, England, now owned by the National Trust.

== History ==
The hall was built in 1642 by a wealthy Halifax clothier, James Murgatroyd. The hall is a Grade I listed building. There is a medieval tithebarn in the grounds.

East Riddlesden Hall perches on a small plateau overlooking a bend in the River Aire on its way downstream from the town of Keighley. Interesting features include well-restored living accommodation on two floors, two Yorkshire Rose windows, walled garden, the ruined Starkie wing and several ghosts (reputedly).

The property was extended and re-built by James Murgatroyd and his wife Hannah, using local Yorkshire stone, in 1648. He also built other stone manor houses throughout the West Riding of Yorkshire. In the great hall, a small fireplace can be seen above the main fireplace, where the floor for the first floor accommodation was not built. James Murgatroyd was a Royalist and this can be seen in royalist symbols and graffiti on and in the building. For example, the Bothy (now the tea room and shop) has the heads of Charles I of England and Henrietta Maria of France carved in the topmost stone work.

According to a National Operatic and Dramatic Association news feature in 2007, the Murgatroyd family are reputed to have been the inspiration for the Murgatroyd Baronets in the comic opera Ruddigore by Gilbert and Sullivan, and the opera has been performed at the Hall. W. S. Gilbert is supposed to have often stayed at the Hall. The feature comments that the Murgatroyds became notorious "for their profanity and debauchery". A legend arose that the River Aire changed its course in shame, in order to flow further away from the hall and its occupants (the river sweeps into a wide U-bend to skirt the meadow, as though giving the building a wide berth). The feature continues "Members of the family were fined, imprisoned and excommunicated". It asserts that the character of Sir Despard Murgatroyd in Ruddigore is based on James Murgatroyd.

== Filming location ==
East Riddlesden Hall has been used as a filming location for the 1992 film Emily Brontë's Wuthering Heights and for the 2009 TV adaptation. It was also used in Sharpe's Justice episode from the Sharpe TV series in 1997. The BBC Television series 'Gunpowder' (2017) used East Riddlesden Hall as a location.

== See also ==
- Grade I listed buildings in West Yorkshire
- Listed buildings in Keighley
