= 2026 City of Bradford Metropolitan District Council election =

2026 English local government election

- 7 May 2026

All 90 seats to City of Bradford Metropolitan District Council 46 seats needed for a majority

	First party	Second party	Third party
Leader		Rebecca Poulsen	Susan Hinchcliffe defeated
Party	Reform	Conservative	Labour
Leader since			May 2026
Leader's seat		Worth Valley
Last election	0 seats, 1.0%	13 seats, 19.9%	49 seats, 32.8%
Seats before	0	13 (Note: Includes the vacant seat in Worth Valley last held by the Conservatves.) (Note: The Conservatives sit as part of the Conservative and Queensbury Independent Group, alongside independent councillor Luke Majkowski.)	47
Seats won	29	18	17
Seat change	▲29	▲5	▼32
	Fourth party	Fifth party	Sixth party
Leader		Matt Edwards	Brendan Stubbs defeated
Party	Independent	Green	Liberal Democrats
Last election	13 seats, 21.1%	10 seats, 15.4%	5 seats, 7.4%
Seats before	15 (Note: 3 groups contain independents; the Bradford Independents Group (9 councillors, led by Talat Sajawal), the Toller Independents (1 councillor), the Conservative and Queensbury Independent Group (1 independent councillor and 12 Conservative councillors). 5 councillors sit as ungrouped independents.)	10	5
Seats won	13	9	4
Seat change	Steady	▼1	▼1
- Results by ward
Leader before election
Susan Hinchcliffe
Labour
Leader after election
Stephen Place
Reform UK
No overall control

The 2026 City of Bradford Metropolitan District Council election took place on Thursday 7 May 2026, alongside other local elections in the United Kingdom. All 90 members of the City of Bradford Metropolitan District Council in West Yorkshire were elected following boundary changes. The election in Idle and Thackley ward took place in June 2026, having been delayed due to the death of a candidate.

Prior to the election, the council was under Labour majority control. At the election, the council went under no overall control. Reform UK, which held no seats prior to the election, emerged as the largest party with 29 seats, but this was 17 seats short of the 46 needed for a majority. Labour went from having a majority to holding just 17 seats, making them the third largest party behind Reform and the Conservatives. The incumbent Labour leader of the council, Susan Hinchcliffe, lost her seat.

After the election, Reform chose Stephen Place to be its new group leader. He was formally appointed as the new leader of the council at the subsequent annual council meeting on 19 May 2026 on a second vote; the initial vote went against him, but after an adjournment the other parties abstained from voting against his appointment, allowing him to be appointed on Reform votes alone. He subsequently appointed an executive wholly made up of Reform councillors, operating as a Reform minority administration.

== Background ==
Bradford was created in 1974 as a metropolitan borough. The Conservatives formed a majority administration from its creation until 1978, when the council fell into no overall control. Labour won their first majority in 1980, and have been the only party to form majority administrations since. Aside from a brief period between 2004 and 2006, Labour have been the largest party on the council for the entirety of the 21st century and have continuously held a majority of seats since 2014.

2024 saw Labour fall to its lowest number of councillors in eight years following large gains by independents, which some attributed to Labour's stance on the Gaza war. Labour won 10 seats (down 4), independents won 9 seats (up 4), the Conservatives won 4 seats (down 2), the Green Party won 4 seats (up 2) and the Liberal Democrats won 3 seats (steady). Following the election, the Conservatives formed a group with independent councillor Luke Majkowski.

This election took place on a new set of ward boundaries, meaning all 90 seats were up for election.

== Council composition ==
After 2024 election		Before 2026 election	
Party	Seats	Party	Seats
Labour	49	Labour	47
Conservative	13	Conservative	13
Green	10	Green	10
Liberal Democrats	5	Liberal Democrats	4
Independent	13	Independent	16
Vacant	N/A	Vacant	1

Changes 2024–2026:

- February 2025: Marcus Dearden (Labour) leaves party to sit as an independent
- March 2025: Joe Wheatley (Labour) leaves party to sit as an independent
- November 2025: Russell Brown (Conservative) dies – by-election held February 2026
- February 2026:
  - Paul Golding (Conservative) wins by-election
  - Mohsin Hussain (Labour) suspended from party
- April 2026: Jeanette Sunderland (Liberal Democrats) dies – election postponed to June 2026

== Election result ==
Council composition after the 2024 election

Council composition after the 2026 election

2026 Bradford District Council election (Note: The summary table includes the Idle and Thackley postponed election.)
Party	Candidates	Elected	Net change	Seats %	Votes %	Votes	Vote change
Reform UK	90	29	▲29	32.22	22.88	99,722	▲21.88
Conservative	90	18	▲5	20.00	16.87	73,542	▼3.03
Labour	90	17	▼32	18.89	20.86	90,932	▼11.94
Green	90	9	▼1	10.00	20.79	90,594	▲5.39
Your Bradford Independent group	29	9	▲9	10.00	9.12	39,758	New
Independent	23	4	▼9	4.44	4.49	19,554	▼16.61
Liberal Democrats	36	4	▼1	4.44	4.81	20,947	▼2.59
Yorkshire Party	1	0	0	0.00	0.05	209	▼1.95
British Democratic Party	1	0	0	0.00	0.04	180	▼0.06
Trade Unionist and Socialist Coalition	2	0	0	0.00	0.03	147	▼0.07
Social Democratic Party	2	0	0	0.00	0.03	112	▲0.02
Heritage Party	1	0	0	0.00	0.02	98	New
UK Independence Party	1	0	0	0.00	0.01	33	▼0.09
Total	456	90	0	100.0	100.0	435,828	
Rejected ballots						440	

== Results by ward ==
An asterisk (*) denotes the incumbent councillor seeking re-election.

=== Airedale ===
Airedale
Party	Candidate	Votes	%
Conservative	George Buckley	2,430	14.7
Conservative	Peter Kirk	2,151	13.0
Conservative	Raph Cohn	2,089	12.6
Green	Caroline Whitaker*	2,038	12.3
Green	Janet Russell*	1,897	11.5
Green	Neil Whitaker*	1,893	11.4
Reform	Daniel Keenan	1,092	6.6
Reform	Nathen Keenan	987	6.0
Reform	Linda Macro	947	5.7
Labour	Val Carroll	289	1.7
Labour	Wendy Neville	243	1.5
Yorkshire	Peter Kaye	209	1.3
Labour	Jan Smithies	175	1.1
Liberal Democrats	Michael Dyson	87	0.5
UKIP	Alexander Robinson	33	0.2
Total votes		16,560	100.0
Rejected ballots		8	
Registered electors		11,302	
Conservative win (new seat)			
Conservative win (new seat)			
Conservative win (new seat)			

=== Baildon ===
Baildon
Party	Candidate	Votes	%
Conservative	Debbie Davies*	2,455	14.1
Reform	Ian Eglin	1,649	9.5
Conservative	David Ford	1,546	8.9
Labour	Gill Dixon	1,522	8.7
Reform	Michael Ward	1,497	8.6
Reform	Jamie Izzard	1,469	8.4
Conservative	Alekss Belskis	1,295	7.4
Labour	Sam Clifford-Hassan	1,286	7.4
Independent	Joe Ashton	1,207	6.9
Labour	Paul Vaughan	1,037	6.0
Green	Carl Dunk	937	5.4
Green	Simon Bullock	641	3.7
Green	Elsie Watson	617	3.5
Liberal Democrats	Susan Elliott	262	1.5
Total votes		17,420	100.0
Rejected ballots		8	
Registered electors		12,026	
Conservative win (new seat)			
Reform win (new seat)			
Conservative win (new seat)			

=== Bingley East ===
Bingley East
Party	Candidate	Votes	%
Independent	Joe Wheatley*	3,322	16.4
Labour	Susan Fricker*	2,007	9.9
Reform	Stuart Brown	1,882	9.3
Reform	Max Blackwell	1,847	9.1
Reform	Derrick Hodgson	1,649	8.2
Conservative	Andrew Fenton	1,480	7.3
Labour	Ben Pickles	1,348	6.7
Conservative	James Gill	1,285	6.4
Green	Jeremy Thackray	1,204	6.0
Labour	Jane Elgar	1,140	5.6
Conservative	Bradley Whittingham	1,049	5.2
Green	Rob Eagle	803	4.0
Green	Jordan Robertshaw-Jowett	686	3.4
Liberal Democrats	Peter Russell	452	2.2
SDP	Alexander Vann	42	0.2
Total votes		20,196	100.0
Rejected ballots		7	
Registered electors		13,507	
Independent win (new seat)			
Labour win (new seat)			
Reform win (new seat)			

=== Bingley West ===
Bingley West
Party	Candidate	Votes	%
Conservative	Paul Sullivan*	2,503	14.0
Conservative	Geoff Winnard*	2,080	11.6
Conservative	Falak Ahmed*	1,902	10.6
Green	Cath Bacon	1,710	9.5
Reform	Bev Ford	1,655	9.2
Reform	Christopher Peel	1,655	9.2
Reform	Sean Maguire	1,587	8.8
Green	John Brazendale	1,367	7.6
Green	Rachael Drucquer	1,359	7.6
Labour	Jenny Kimber	650	3.6
Labour	Tony Alderson	626	3.5
Labour	George Scaife	511	2.8
Liberal Democrats	Helen Baranowski	258	1.4
SDP	Paul Shkurka	70	0.4
Total votes		17,933	100.0
Rejected ballots		8	
Registered electors		12,792	
Conservative win (new seat)			
Conservative win (new seat)			
Conservative win (new seat)			

=== Bolton & Undercliffe ===
Bolton & Undercliffe
Party	Candidate	Votes	%
Labour	Suhail Choudhry*	1,400	12.2
Reform	Jon Barras	1,193	10.4
Labour	Md Niaz	1,131	9.8
Labour	Julie Humphreys*	1,115	9.7
Reform	Chris Norton	1,101	9.6
Reform	Andrew Tetley	1,083	9.4
Your Bradford Independent group	David Ward*	943	8.2
Green	Helen Love	697	6.1
Green	Bruce Gulland	623	5.4
Green	Iarlaithe Ward	544	4.7
Your Bradford Independent group	Rajdeep Bhatti	482	4.2
Your Bradford Independent group	Imtiaz Sabir	438	3.8
Liberal Democrats	Benjamin Senior	248	2.2
Conservative	Muhammad Afzal	212	1.8
Conservative	Safeer Ghori	156	1.4
Conservative	Tasaver Syed	147	1.3
Total votes		11,513	100.0
Rejected ballots		17	
Registered electors		12,374	
Labour win (new seat)			
Reform win (new seat)			
Labour win (new seat)			

=== Bowling & Barkerend ===
Bowling and Barkerend
Party	Candidate	Votes	%
Labour	Rizwana Jamil*	1,394	11.6
Labour	Imran Khan*	1,346	11.2
Labour	Hassan Khan	1,294	10.8
Your Bradford Independent group	Mukhtar Ali	1,198	10.0
Your Bradford Independent group	Sakib Ali	1,148	9.6
Your Bradford Independent group	Mazeena Zaki	988	8.2
Green	Sadaf Dar	705	5.9
Reform	Wendy Barras	678	5.7
Green	Gavin Lee	668	5.6
Reform	Mark Hall	659	5.5
Reform	Bernard Blessington	645	5.4
Green	Gordon North	612	5.1
Liberal Democrats	Howard Middleton	217	1.8
Conservative	Malik Farouq	156	1.3
Conservative	Yakubu John	151	1.3
Conservative	Sangeeta Khan	128	1.1
Total votes		11,987	100.0
Rejected ballots		24	
Registered electors		14,342	
Labour win (new seat)			
Labour win (new seat)			
Labour win (new seat)			

=== Bradford Moor ===
Bradford Moor
Party	Candidate	Votes	%
Liberal Democrats	Riaz Ahmed*	1,977	14.1
Your Bradford Independent group	Ibrar Ali	1,810	12.9
Labour	Zafar Iqbal*	1,741	12.4
Your Bradford Independent group	Ushman Shabir	1,473	10.5
Labour	Mohammad Shafiq*	1,395	10.0
Labour	Wajid Jahangir	1,172	8.4
Liberal Democrats	Raja Khan	1,129	8.1
Liberal Democrats	Jafrul Gazi	942	6.7
Green	Adil Afzal	747	5.3
Green	Diane McInnes	405	2.9
Green	Andy Rickford	390	2.8
Reform	Neil Ford	163	1.2
Reform	Gareth Ingham	139	1.0
Conservative	Ijaz Choudhary	134	1.0
Conservative	Muhammad Ashraf	131	0.9
Reform	Roger Pinto-Smith	131	0.9
Conservative	Bushra Parveen	108	0.8
Total votes		13,987	100.0
Rejected ballots		23	
Registered electors		13,833	
Liberal Democrats win (new seat)			
Your Bradford Independent group win (new seat)			
Labour win (new seat)			

=== City ===
City
Party	Candidate	Votes	%
Labour	Nazam Azam*	2,033	17.8
Labour	Sajawal Hussain	1,512	13.2
Labour	Shakeela Lal*	1,472	12.9
Green	Mohammed Haleem	1,119	9.8
Your Bradford Independent group	Majid Ali	913	8.0
Your Bradford Independent group	Rizwan Saleem*	911	8.0
Green	Shazia Sheikh	879	7.7
Green	Matthew Tadych	750	6.6
Your Bradford Independent group	Sundas Ali	601	5.3
Reform	Maureen Harrison	177	1.5
Reform	Paul Hogan	171	1.5
Conservative	Pollyanna Greene-Wright	162	1.4
Reform	Simon Smith	157	1.4
Independent	Mohammad Naeem	123	1.1
Independent	Saeeka Tabassum	102	0.9
Conservative	Tayyeb Munir	98	0.9
Conservative	Alhassan Osman	89	0.8
Independent	Bahlal Saleem	88	0.8
Liberal Democrats	Tariq Mahmood	79	0.7
Total votes		11,436	100.0
Rejected ballots		23	
Registered electors		13,859	
Labour win (new seat)			
Labour win (new seat)			
Labour win (new seat)			

=== Clayton & Fairweather Green ===
Clayton & Fairweather Green
Party	Candidate	Votes	%
Reform	Daniel Devaney	1,387	11.0
Reform	Richard Brown	1,349	10.7
Labour	Carol Thirkill*	1,241	9.8
Reform	John Worsley	1,212	9.6
Labour	Sinead Engel*	1,116	8.8
Labour	Mozalfa Ilyas*	1,108	8.8
Green	Sadiq Hameed	800	6.3
Green	Zaf Shah	757	6.0
Green	Asim Suleman	705	5.6
Your Bradford Independent group	Nabeela Abid	564	4.5
Your Bradford Independent group	Waqas Mirza	560	4.4
Your Bradford Independent group	Afraheem Shahzad	499	3.9
Conservative	Kate Lawton	409	3.2
Conservative	John Hudson	384	3.0
Liberal Democrats	Judith Brooksbank	288	2.3
Conservative	Mohammed Nazam	258	2.0
Total votes		12,637	100.0
Rejected ballots		14	
Registered electors		12,276	
Reform win (new seat)			
Reform win (new seat)			
Labour win (new seat)			

=== Eccleshill ===
Eccleshill
Party	Candidate	Votes	%
Reform	Jayne Morgan	1,634	12.7
Reform	John Riley-Holmes	1,594	12.4
Reform	Selina Ward-Nicholson	1,544	12.0
Labour	Chris Hayden*	914	7.1
Liberal Democrats	Brendan Stubbs*	890	6.9
Liberal Democrats	Suzanne Lubenko	817	6.4
Labour	Ian Parsons*	804	6.3
Liberal Democrats	Gillian Thorne	737	5.8
Labour	Vera Martin	722	5.6
Green	Kevin Hullah	596	4.7
Green	Junaid Sawar	547	4.3
Green	Dominic Sheeran	534	4.2
Independent	Wajid Rasool	340	2.7
Independent	Raja Hussain	296	2.3
Independent	Doctor Jamshad	279	2.2
Conservative	Nadeem Butt	199	1.6
Conservative	Zubair Hussain	156	1.2
Conservative	Khalid Mahmood	144	1.1
TUSC	Laura Fretwell	69	0.5
Total votes		12,816	100.0
Rejected ballots		12	
Registered electors		13,873	
Reform win (new seat)			
Reform win (new seat)			
Reform win (new seat)			

=== Great Horton ===
Great Horton
Party	Candidate	Votes	%
Labour	Abdul Jabar	1,584	12.4
Labour	Vasim Akhtar	1,495	11.7
Labour	Joanne Dodds*	1,476	11.6
Your Bradford Independent group	Tariq Hussain*	1,243	9.8
Your Bradford Independent group	Saddiq Sirferaz*	1,234	9.7
Your Bradford Independent group	Mazafar Iqbal	1,049	8.2
Green	Hannah Capes	810	6.4
Green	Mike Daw	681	5.3
Green	Robbie Deacon	661	5.2
Reform	Pauline Brierley	555	4.4
Reform	Darrell Wilson	506	4.0
Reform	Jitendra Gupta	493	3.9
Conservative	Paul Roberts	232	1.8
Conservative	Dawn Collins	218	1.7
Conservative	Coral Whittlestone	206	1.6
Independent	Abid Zaman	175	1.4
Liberal Democrats	Sarah Moses	128	1.0
Total votes		12,746	100.0
Rejected ballots		13	
Registered electors		12,365	
Labour win (new seat)			
Labour win (new seat)			
Labour win (new seat)			

=== Heaton & Frizinghall ===
Heaton and Frizinghall
Party	Candidate	Votes	%
Green	Khalid Mahmood	2,440	16.8
Green	Nargus Rangzeb	1,913	13.2
Your Bradford Independent group	Ishtiaq Ahmed*	1,857	12.8
Green	Mohammed Hanif	1,824	12.5
Your Bradford Independent group	Aleem Bashir	1,518	10.4
Your Bradford Independent group	Shabana Bashir	1,280	8.8
Labour	Nussrat Mohammed*	863	5.9
Labour	Sijyy Sajjad	842	5.8
Labour	Humayun Islam	631	4.3
Reform	Leslie Bennett	265	1.8
Reform	Fred Knowles	260	1.8
Reform	Glenn Nixon	245	1.7
Conservative	Megan Cowen	182	1.3
Conservative	Kathleen Egan	167	1.1
Conservative	John Passman	153	1.1
Liberal Democrats	Adrian Todd	106	0.7
Total votes		14,546	100.0
Rejected ballots		18	
Registered electors		13,109	
Green win (new seat)			
Green win (new seat)			
Your Bradford Independent group win (new seat)			

=== Holme Wood & Bierley ===
Holme Wood and Bierley
Party	Candidate	Votes	%
Green	Matt Edwards*	1,665	18.1
Green	Celia Hickson*	1,444	15.7
Green	Iain McInnes	1,348	14.7
Reform	Steve Hammond	1,132	12.3
Reform	John Jakes	1,094	11.9
Reform	Nicky Knowles	1,085	11.8
Labour	Nigel Guy	347	3.8
Labour	Martin Bottomley	337	3.7
Labour	Richard Lewis	281	3.1
Conservative	Stuart Hastings	154	1.7
Conservative	Alexander Metcalfe	116	1.3
Conservative	Shamas Khan	106	1.2
Liberal Democrats	Ines Riach	83	0.9
Total votes		9,192	100.0
Rejected ballots		14	
Registered electors		12,589	
Green win (new seat)			
Green win (new seat)			
Green win (new seat)			

=== Idle & Thackley ===
The election in Idle and Thackley was delayed from 7 May to 18 June 2026 following the death of a Liberal Democrat candidate Cllr Jeanette Sunderland.

Idle and Thackley
Party	Candidate	Votes	%
Liberal Democrats	Rachel Sunderland	2,784	19.0
Liberal Democrats	Alun Griffiths*	2,746	18.7
Liberal Democrats	Aislin Naylor*	2,714	18.5
Reform	Tom Macpherson Le Maire	1,582	10.8
Reform	David Mills	1,573	10.7
Reform	John Riley	1,528	10.4
Green	Melissa Jacobs	237	1.6
Green	Tess Lawrence	229	1.6
Labour	Evelyne Godfrey	208	1.4
Green	Stuart Hurlbut	204	1.4
Conservative	David Bryant	195	1.3
Labour	Paul Wright	191	1.3
Labour	Gareth Logan	190	1.3
Conservative	Sally Cook	142	1.0
Conservative	Richard Wightman	127	0.9
Total votes		14,650	100.0
Rejected ballots		4	
Liberal Democrats win (new seat)			
Liberal Democrats win (new seat)			
Liberal Democrats win (new seat)			

=== Ilkley & Addingham ===
Ilkley and Addingham
Party	Candidate	Votes	%
Conservative	Andrew Loy*	3,775	15.7
Conservative	Richard Downey	3,678	15.3
Conservative	Jane Sellers	3,602	14.9
Green	Ros Brown*	3,229	13.4
Green	Ellen D'Arcy	2,679	11.1
Green	Richard Wilson	2,476	10.3
Labour	Stephen Hey	881	3.7
Liberal Democrats	Mark Stidworthy	707	2.9
Reform	Greg Robinson	687	2.9
Reform	Ray Lenik	657	2.7
Reform	Craig Sanderson	653	2.7
Labour	Lorraine Dowson	595	2.5
Labour	John Flaherty	478	2.0
Total votes		24,097	100.0
Rejected ballots		14	
Registered electors		13,132	
Conservative win (new seat)			
Conservative win (new seat)			
Conservative win (new seat)			

=== Keighley Central ===
Keighley Central
Party	Candidate	Votes	%
Labour	Amjad Zaman*	2,342	17.4
Independent	Amjid Ahmed	1,597	11.9
Your Bradford Independent group	Vaz Shabir	1,508	11.2
Independent	Nasser Razak	1,383	10.3
Independent	Muhammad Basharat	1,029	7.7
Labour	Roisin Engel	580	4.3
Green	Ashley Pates	539	4.0
Reform	Ian Berrisford	533	4.0
Conservative	Harry Burns	506	3.8
Reform	Leslie Dean	492	3.7
Labour	David Wilford	482	3.6
Reform	Gez Lloyd-Brown	477	3.6
Conservative	Robert Goulding	463	3.4
Green	Ryan Walsh	460	3.4
Green	James Whitaker	445	3.3
Conservative	Sean Spence	441	3.3
Liberal Democrats	James Naylor	145	1.1
Total votes		13,422	100.0
Rejected ballots		18	
Registered electors		12,704	
Labour win (new seat)			
Independent win (new seat)			
Your Bradford Independent group win (new seat)			

=== Keighley East ===
Keighley East
Party	Candidate	Votes	%
Labour	Caroline Firth*	1,658	10.9
Reform	Angela Baker	1,587	10.4
Conservative	Angela Fish	1,523	10.0
Conservative	Wendy Harrison	1,495	9.8
Labour	Lisa Robinson*	1,466	9.6
Labour	Fulzar Ahmed*	1,418	9.3
Reform	Tom Commis	1,416	9.3
Reform	Alan Outlaw	1,292	8.5
Conservative	Mohammed Muazzam	1,151	7.6
Green	Polly Burton	777	5.1
Green	Duncan Hunnisett	611	4.0
Green	Stephen Miles	575	3.8
Liberal Democrats	Nicholas Allon	251	1.6
Total votes		15,220	100.0
Rejected ballots		16	
Registered electors		12,668	
Labour win (new seat)			
Reform win (new seat)			
Conservative win (new seat)			

=== Keighley West ===
Keighley West
Party	Candidate	Votes	%
Reform	Andrew Judson	1,597	13.5
Conservative	Peter Hill	1,375	11.6
Reform	Dawn Thewlis	1,336	11.3
Reform	Garry Morton	1,330	11.2
Conservative	Helen Goulding	1,248	10.5
Conservative	Howard Buckley	1,174	9.9
Labour	Martyn Oliver	801	6.8
Labour	Ash Joomun-Whitehead	701	5.9
Labour	Amanda Patchett	610	5.1
Green	Dawn Harris	576	4.9
Green	Frances Powell	476	4.0
Green	Ian Linnegan	473	4.0
Liberal Democrats	David Hewitt	160	1.3
Total votes		11,857	100.0
Rejected ballots		8	
Registered electors		11,860	
Reform win (new seat)			
Conservative win (new seat)			
Reform win (new seat)			

=== Little Horton ===
Little Horton
Party	Candidate	Votes	%
Your Bradford Independent group	Talat Sajawal*	2,513	18.0
Your Bradford Independent group	Taj Salam*	2,219	15.9
Your Bradford Independent group	Noor Elahi*	2,035	14.6
Labour	Imran Khan	1,848	13.3
Labour	Maz Zaman	1,568	11.2
Labour	Jude Rowe	1,038	7.4
Green	Nurjahan Arobi	440	3.2
Green	Christine Boyd	399	2.9
Green	Sophie Vanicat	371	2.7
Reform	Will Grant	277	2.0
Reform	Paul Roper	251	1.8
Reform	Dave Leonard	250	1.8
Independent	Shafi Khan	240	1.7
Independent	Maj Asghar	172	1.2
Liberal Democrats	John Cole	91	0.7
Conservative	Jacquie Jarvis	88	0.6
Conservative	Abdul Sattar	71	0.5
Conservative	Ashfaq Rasool	68	0.5
Total votes		13,939	100.0
Rejected ballots		19	
Registered electors		12,785	
Your Bradford Independent group win (new seat)			
Your Bradford Independent group win (new seat)			
Your Bradford Independent group win (new seat)			

=== Manningham ===
Manningham
Party	Candidate	Votes	%
Your Bradford Independent group	Muhammed Islam*	3,796	24.0
Your Bradford Independent group	Muhammad Khan	3,070	19.4
Your Bradford Independent group	Mohammed Saliss	2,999	19.0
Labour	Safina Kauser*	1,345	8.5
Labour	Fatima Ali	1,037	6.6
Green	Shazad Ali	983	6.2
Labour	Ashraf Miah	962	6.1
Green	Bruce Barnes	510	3.2
Green	Ahdam Rana	498	3.2
Conservative	Susan Andrews	116	0.7
Reform	Steve Call	91	0.6
Reform	Rosemary Izzard	90	0.6
Conservative	Khalid Anjum	88	0.6
Reform	Siobhan Helliwell	80	0.5
Liberal Democrats	Anthony Stockdale	72	0.5
Conservative	Ian Cowen	59	0.4
Total votes		15,796	100.0
Rejected ballots		35	
Registered electors		14,240	
Your Bradford Independent group win (new seat)			
Your Bradford Independent group win (new seat)			
Your Bradford Independent group win (new seat)			

=== Queensbury ===
Queensbury
Party	Candidate	Votes	%
Reform	Robin Cumming	2,344	17.6
Reform	Ian Evans	2,311	17.3
Reform	Chris Masterson	2,128	16.0
Independent	Paul Cromie	821	6.2
Green	Sophie Williams	716	5.4
Labour	Alex Mitchell*	685	5.1
Green	Charlotte Woollard	624	4.7
Labour	Ashley Isherwood	607	4.6
Conservative	Robert Illingworth	591	4.4
Green	Anni Raw	583	4.4
Labour	Gill Thornton	581	4.4
Conservative	Adam Paterson	545	4.1
Conservative	Phoenix Talbot	490	3.7
Liberal Democrats	Muhammad Baig	305	2.3
Total votes		13,331	100.0
Rejected ballots		9	
Registered electors		11,637	
Reform win (new seat)			
Reform win (new seat)			
Reform win (new seat)			

=== Royds ===
Royds
Party	Candidate	Votes	%
Reform	Oliver Bolton-Williams	1,652	17.2
Reform	Stephen Place	1,609	16.7
Reform	Tony Wooffitt	1,566	16.3
Labour	Angela Tait*	789	8.2
Labour	Andrew Thornton*	714	7.4
Labour	Simon Cunningham	694	7.2
Green	Tabitha Bast	577	6.0
Green	Emily McDowall	569	5.9
Green	Will Worboys	479	5.0
Conservative	Charles Agar	289	3.0
Conservative	Hazel Bateman	284	3.0
Conservative	Ian Fletcher	242	2.5
Liberal Democrats	Steven Cotterill	157	1.6
Total votes		9,621	100.0
Rejected ballots		20	
Registered electors		11,599	
Reform win (new seat)			
Reform win (new seat)			
Reform win (new seat)			

=== Shipley ===
Shipley
Party	Candidate	Votes	%
Green	Kevin Warnes*	3,747	22.4
Green	Anna Watson*	3,744	22.4
Green	Hawarun Hussain	3,408	20.4
Reform	Stuart Baggaley	918	5.5
Reform	Peter Robinson	845	5.1
Reform	Ben Lundergan	838	5.0
Labour	Jen Kilyon	708	4.2
Labour	Qasem Awan	602	3.6
Labour	Athif Khan	530	3.2
Conservative	Anita Belska	361	2.2
Conservative	Thomas Creighton	358	2.1
Conservative	Geoffrey Whiteley	333	2.0
Liberal Democrats	Christopher Morley	238	1.4
TUSC	Tom Gibson	78	0.5
Total votes		16,708	100.0
Rejected ballots		15	
Registered electors		11,704	
Green win (new seat)			
Green win (new seat)			
Green win (new seat)			

=== Thornton & Allerton ===
Thornton and Allerton
Party	Candidate	Votes	%
Reform	Lester Martin	1,607	11.6
Reform	Melanie Milnes	1,597	11.5
Reform	John Sharples	1,458	10.5
Labour	Beverley Mullaney*	1,279	9.2
Labour	Omar Hussain	1,038	7.5
Labour	Nana Hagan	915	6.6
Green	Alice Patterson	847	6.1
Independent	Gordon Payne	840	6.1
Green	Farah Rahman	692	5.0
Independent	Osman Gondal	684	4.9
Green	Maaria Rehman	641	4.6
Conservative	Clive Richardson	621	4.5
Independent	Qamar Ahmed	569	4.1
Conservative	John Robertshaw	392	2.8
Liberal Democrats	Anthea Griffiths	373	2.7
Conservative	Safeyan Siddique	218	1.6
Heritage	Michael Cockayne	98	0.7
Total votes		13,869	100.0
Rejected ballots		11	
Registered electors		13,105	
Reform win (new seat)			
Reform win (new seat)			
Reform win (new seat)			

=== Toller ===
Toller
Party	Candidate	Votes	%
Labour	Kamran Hussain*	2,155	14.6
Independent	Arshad Hussain	1,723	11.7
Independent	Zohair Kamran	1,548	10.5
Labour	Fozia Shaheen*	1,530	10.4
Independent	Sophie Bibi	1,403	9.5
Labour	Raf Rafaqat	1,377	9.3
Green	Aisha Bibi	1,201	8.1
Green	Hamza Rehman	1,007	6.8
Green	Muneeb Yaqub	823	5.6
Independent	Mahfooz Khan	704	4.8
Independent	Sharat Hussain	402	2.7
Conservative	Mohammed Bhatti	142	1.0
Reform	Brian Hinchliffe	139	0.9
Reform	Mark Lawrenson	139	0.9
Conservative	Parvez Akhtar	131	0.9
Conservative	Ghafoor Hussain	113	0.8
Reform	Caz Ramsden	113	0.8
Liberal Democrats	Andrew Sunderland	93	0.6
Total votes		14,743	100.0
Rejected ballots		32	
Registered electors		13,601	
Labour win (new seat)			
Independent win (new seat)			
Independent win (new seat)			

=== Wharfedale ===
Wharfedale
Party	Candidate	Votes	%
Conservative	Bob Felstead*	2,571	13.0
Green	Lottie Kitching	2,122	10.7
Conservative	Peter Cochrane	2,060	10.4
Conservative	Jo White	2,036	10.3
Green	Chris Turner	2,004	10.1
Labour	Christopher Steele*	1,490	7.5
Green	Daniel Guy	1,474	7.5
Labour	Peter Iliff	1,230	6.2
Reform	Nicholas Carter	1,159	5.9
Labour	Amanda Peters	1,078	5.4
Reform	Ronald Harriman	1,022	5.2
Reform	Dan Neal	1,016	5.1
Liberal Democrats	Pauline Allon	521	2.6
Total votes		19,783	100.0
Rejected ballots		12	
Registered electors		12,057	
Conservative win (new seat)			
Green win (new seat)			
Conservative win (new seat)			

=== Wibsey & Odsal ===
Wibsey and Odsal
Party	Candidate	Votes	%
Reform	Steve Burd	1,641	13.8
Reform	Darren Ingham	1,541	13.0
Reform	Jason Townend	1,525	12.9
Labour	Faiz Ilyas*	1,091	9.2
Labour	Ralph Berry*	1,083	9.1
Labour	Sabiya Khan*	971	8.2
Green	Alex Radice	845	7.1
Green	Andrew Wood	623	5.3
Green	Brian Ford	615	5.2
Your Bradford Independent group	Nick Peterken	471	4.0
Your Bradford Independent group	Alayna Khan	366	3.1
Conservative	David Cowell	347	2.9
Conservative	Hassan Butt	286	2.4
Conservative	Amena Patel	238	2.0
Liberal Democrats	Mary Whitrick	212	1.8
Total votes		11,855	100.0
Rejected ballots		11	
Registered electors		11,769	
Reform win (new seat)			
Reform win (new seat)			
Reform win (new seat)			

=== Windhill & Wrose ===
Windhill and Wrose
Party	Candidate	Votes	%
Reform	Sally Birch	1,874	15.1
Reform	Stephen Broadbent	1,852	15.0
Reform	Chris Howlett	1,730	14.0
Labour	Susan Hinchcliffe*	1,373	11.1
Labour	Liz Rowe*	1,217	9.8
Labour	Alex Ross-Shaw*	1,203	9.7
Green	Kurt McMillan	561	4.5
Green	Ralph Saunders	517	4.2
Green	Aly Telfer	455	3.7
Conservative	Stephen Butler	387	3.1
Independent	Gazz Hall	357	2.9
Conservative	Harriet Wood	346	2.8
Conservative	Tkay Shana	267	2.2
Liberal Democrats	Anthony Meadows	236	1.9
Total votes		12,375	100.0
Rejected ballots		11	
Registered electors		11,286	
Reform win (new seat)			
Reform win (new seat)			
Reform win (new seat)			

=== Worth Valley ===
Worth Valley
Party	Candidate	Votes	%
Conservative	Rebecca Poulsen*	3,740	19.5
Conservative	Christopher Herd*	3,392	17.7
Conservative	Paul Golding	3,075	16.1
Reform	Helen Ingham-Cook	1,501	7.8
Reform	Craig Whale	1,457	7.6
Reform	Judith White	1,412	7.4
Green	Patrick Wilson	970	5.1
Green	Josie McMaster	771	4.0
Green	Brian Newham	700	3.7
Labour	Peter Kates	658	3.4
Labour	Tamara Christian	575	3.0
Labour	Pat Oxley	556	2.9
Liberal Democrats	Kay Kirkham	194	1.0
Independent	Sabine Ebert-Forbes	150	0.8
Total votes		19,151	100.0
Rejected ballots		5	
Registered electors		13,844	
Conservative win (new seat)			
Conservative win (new seat)			
Conservative win (new seat)			

=== Wyke ===
Wyke
Party	Candidate	Votes	%
Reform	Ian Reed	2,181	17.6
Reform	Adam Thompson-Day	2,119	17.1
Reform	Ian Walker	2,081	16.8
Labour	Tom Hughes*	787	6.4
Green	Andrew Neilly	733	5.9
Labour	Sharon Ratcliffe	716	5.8
Labour	Andy Walsh*	701	5.7
Green	Will Robinson	685	5.5
Green	Kay Thomas	660	5.3
Conservative	Peter Bateman	474	3.8
Conservative	Stephen Goodwill	450	3.6
Conservative	Richard Milczanowski	357	2.9
Liberal Democrats	Kevin Hall	248	2.0
British Democratic	James Lewthwaite	180	1.5
Total votes		12,372	100.0
Rejected ballots		11	
Registered electors		11,542	
Reform win (new seat)			
Reform win (new seat)			
Reform win (new seat)			

== Aftermath ==
On 12 May 2026, Imran Khan was named the new leader of the Labour group on Bradford Council.
