= 1980 City of Bradford Metropolitan District Council election =

1980 UK local government election

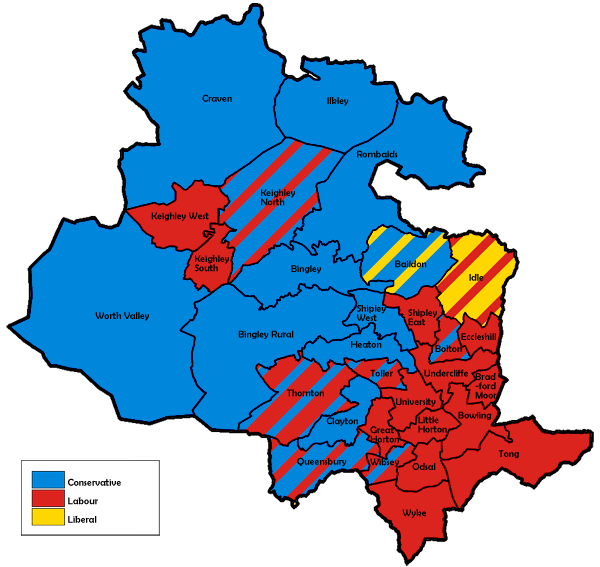
Map of the results for the 1980 Bradford council election.

Elections to City of Bradford Metropolitan District Council were held on Thursday, 1 May 1980, with boundary changes prompting the entirety of the council to be elected.

The boundary changes subtracted a ward from the existing 31 - decreasing the councillor total by three to 90 - with just under half the ward names surviving the changes:

Abolished:

- Allerton
- Bingley: Central, East, North & West
- Clayton, Ambler Thorn & Queensbury
- Craven: Silsden, Addingham, Kildwick & Steeton with Eastburn
- Denholme, Cullingworth, Bingley South & Wilsden
- Haworth, Oakworth & Oxenhope
- Ilkley: Ben Rhydding, Ilkley North, South & West
- Ilkley: Burley, Holme & Menston
- Keighley: Keighley Central, East & South
- Keighley: Morton & Keighley North East
- Keighley: North West & West
- Laisterdyke
- Manningham
- Shipley: Central, North & East
- Shipley: South & West

Created:

- Bingley
- Bingley Rural
- Clayton
- Craven
- Ilkley
- Keighley North
- Keighley South
- Keighley West
- Queensbury
- Rombalds
- Shipley East
- Shipley West
- Toller

Worth Valley

The election resulted in Labour gaining control of the council directly from the Conservatives.

== Election result ==
Bradford local election result 1980
Party	Seats	Gains	Losses	Net gain/loss	Seats %	Votes %	Votes	+/−
Labour	50	0	0	0	55.5	46.1	66,916	+0.0
Conservative	37	0	0	0	41.1	41.4	60,088	-3.1
Liberal	3	0	0	0	3.3	10.8	15,736	+1.5
Ecology	0	0	0	0	0.0	0.9	1,295	+0.9
Ratepayers & Residents Association	0	0	0	0	0.0	0.4	516	+0.4
Independent	0	0	0	0	0.0	0.3	431	+0.2

This result had the following consequences for the total number of seats on the council after the elections:

Party	Previous council	New council
Labour	38	50
Conservatives	51	37
Liberals	4	3
Total	93	90
Working majority	-9	10

== Ward results ==
Baildon
Party	Candidate	Votes	%	±%
Liberal	M. Atkinson	3,389	46.8	N/A
Conservative	A. Lightowler	2,629	36.3	N/A
Conservative	D. Moore	2,394		
Liberal	K. Greenwood	1,903		
Liberal	M. Greenwood	1,732		
Labour	I. Alan	1,222	16.9	N/A
Labour	K. Briggs	1,214		
Labour	S. Lancaster	1,088		
Majority		763	10.5	N/A
Turnout		7,237		N/A
Liberal win (new seat)				
Conservative win (new seat)				
Conservative win (new seat)				

Bingley
Party	Candidate	Votes	%	±%
Conservative	J. Booth	2,166	43.3	N/A
Conservative	T. Shaw	2,092		
Conservative	W. Nunn	2,069		
Labour	M. Mould	1,757	35.2	N/A
Liberal	M. Tregoning	1,075	21.5	N/A
Liberal	J. Whitehead	936		
Majority		409	8.2	N/A
Turnout		4,998		N/A
Conservative win (new seat)				
Conservative win (new seat)				
Conservative win (new seat)				

Bingley Rural
Party	Candidate	Votes	%	±%
Conservative	E. Hall	2,890	55.7	N/A
Conservative	D. Conquest	2,713		
Conservative	J. Womersley	2,611		
Labour	C. Wall	1,340	25.8	N/A
Liberal	E. Roberts	962	18.5	N/A
Liberal	S. Clemence	925		
Majority		1,550	29.8	N/A
Turnout		5,192		N/A
Conservative win (new seat)				
Conservative win (new seat)				
Conservative win (new seat)				

Bolton
Party	Candidate	Votes	%	±%
Labour	J. Ryan	2,131	50.2	N/A
Conservative	T. Hall	2,112	49.8	N/A
Labour	J. Allinson	2,112		
Labour	A. Scriven	2,076		
Conservative	F. Lee	2,048		
Conservative	E. Wooler	2,001		
Majority		19	0.4	N/A
Turnout		4,243		N/A
Labour win (new seat)				
Conservative win (new seat)				
Labour win (new seat)				

Bowling
Party	Candidate	Votes	%	±%
Labour	L. Coughlin	3,229	74.4	N/A
Labour	T. Wood	3,202		
Labour	S. Gratton	3,187		
Conservative	J. Claughton	1,110	25.6	N/A
Conservative	P. Moore	1,082		
Conservative	E. Swanson	1,064		
Majority		2,119	48.8	N/A
Turnout		4,339		N/A
Labour win (new seat)				
Labour win (new seat)				
Labour win (new seat)				

Bradford Moor
Party	Candidate	Votes	%	±%
Labour	P. Clarke	3,289	68.9	N/A
Labour	J. Lambert	3,230		
Labour	J. McKenna	3,203		
Conservative	L. Kelly	1,483	31.1	N/A
Conservative	G. Crossley	1,442		
Conservative	M. Choudhury	1,303		
Majority		1,806	37.8	N/A
Turnout		4,772		N/A
Labour win (new seat)				
Labour win (new seat)				
Labour win (new seat)				

Clayton
Party	Candidate	Votes	%	±%
Conservative	J. Hirst	2,266	50.6	N/A
Conservative	R. Farley	2,246		
Conservative	G. Seager	2,224		
Labour	G. Mitchell	2,216	49.4	N/A
Labour	E. Stead	2,118		
Labour	R. Baxter	2,083		
Majority		50	1.1	N/A
Turnout		4,482		N/A
Conservative win (new seat)				
Conservative win (new seat)				
Conservative win (new seat)				

Craven
Party	Candidate	Votes	%	±%
Conservative	E. Hawkins	2,218	40.7	N/A
Conservative	A. Jerome	2,212		
Conservative	J. Barker	2,204		
Liberal	R. Binns	1,883	34.5	N/A
Liberal	E. Drew	1,727		
Liberal	J. Wells	1,637		
Labour	J. Lawrence	1,353	24.8	N/A
Majority		335	6.1	N/A
Turnout		5,454		N/A
Conservative win (new seat)				
Conservative win (new seat)				
Conservative win (new seat)				

Eccleshill
Party	Candidate	Votes	%	±%
Labour	A. Dewhirst	2,652	51.6	N/A
Labour	P. Lancaster	2,583		
Labour	L. Crawforth	2,528		
Conservative	S. Swallow	1,974	38.4	N/A
Conservative	P. Heaton	1,853		
Conservative	J. Lewis	1,845		
Ratepayers & Residents Association	J. Foulds	516	10.0	N/A
Majority		678	13.2	N/A
Turnout		5,142		N/A
Labour win (new seat)				
Labour win (new seat)				
Labour win (new seat)				

Great Horton
Party	Candidate	Votes	%	±%
Labour	M. Thornton	2,840	55.4	N/A
Labour	J. Godward	2,780		
Labour	B. Kearns	2,770		
Conservative	J. Rawnsley	2,286	44.6	N/A
Conservative	H. Ormondroyd	2,228		
Conservative	S. Briggs	2,153		
Majority		554	10.8	N/A
Turnout		5,126		N/A
Labour win (new seat)				
Labour win (new seat)				
Labour win (new seat)				

Heaton
Party	Candidate	Votes	%	±%
Conservative	J. King	2,884	61.1	N/A
Conservative	D. Emmott	2,876		
Conservative	C. Hobson	2,776		
Labour	H. Rashid	1,838	38.9	N/A
Labour	D. McElroy	1,742		
Labour	J. Bruce	1,730		
Majority		1,046	22.1	N/A
Turnout		4,722		N/A
Conservative win (new seat)				
Conservative win (new seat)				
Conservative win (new seat)				

Idle
Party	Candidate	Votes	%	±%
Liberal	P. Hockney	2,015	38.0	N/A
Labour	K. Baxter	1,830	34.5	N/A
Liberal	A. Bagshaw	1,661		
Labour	A. Emsley	1,649		
Labour	A. Miller	1,610		
Liberal	L. Rennison	1,506		
Conservative	T. Keighley	1,457	27.5	N/A
Conservative	A. Garnett	1,399		
Conservative	R. Hughes-Rowlands	1,248		
Majority		185	3.5	N/A
Turnout		5,302		N/A
Liberal win (new seat)				
Labour win (new seat)				
Liberal win (new seat)				

Ilkley
Party	Candidate	Votes	%	±%
Conservative	J. Spencer	2,693	55.3	N/A
Conservative	J. Lightband	2,626		
Conservative	A. Turner	2,452		
Liberal	T. Crawshaw	1,175	24.1	N/A
Liberal	S. Hobson	1,091		
Labour				
Ecology	J. Fielding	568	11.7	N/A
Independent	C. Poole	431	8.9	N/A
Ecology	R. Adsell	350		
Majority		1,518	31.2	N/A
Turnout		4,867		N/A
Conservative win (new seat)				
Conservative win (new seat)				
Conservative win (new seat)				

Keighley North
Party	Candidate	Votes	%	±%
Conservative	P. Gilmour	2,193	43.9	N/A
Conservative	A. Trigg	2,089		
Labour	R. Hardacre	2,028	40.6	N/A
Labour	F. Sunderland	1,974		
Conservative	D. Smith	1,877		
Labour	M. Allison	1,833		
Liberal	G. Sims	776	15.5	N/A
Liberal	P. Harrison	618		
Majority		165	3.3	N/A
Turnout		4,997		N/A
Conservative win (new seat)				
Conservative win (new seat)				
Labour win (new seat)				

Keighley South
Party	Candidate	Votes	%	±%
Labour	W. Clarkson	2,440	58.9	N/A
Labour	E. Newby	2,343		
Labour	H. Peacock	2,314		
Liberal	J. Brooksbank	867	20.9	N/A
Conservative	G. Dawson	839	20.2	N/A
Conservative	J. Maxfield	736		
Conservative	T. McDaid	718		
Liberal	D. Beaumont	631		
Liberal	S. Green	581		
Majority		1,573	37.9	N/A
Turnout		4,146		N/A
Labour win (new seat)				
Labour win (new seat)				
Labour win (new seat)				

Keighley West
Party	Candidate	Votes	%	±%
Labour	S. Bowen	2,632	49.4	N/A
Labour	B. Thorne	2,620		
Labour	P. Beeley	2,483		
Conservative	M. Cowen	2,205	41.4	N/A
Conservative	H. Harrison	2,077		
Conservative	N. Smith	1,975		
Liberal	R. Taylor	491	9.2	N/A
Liberal	W. Edge	452		
Majority		427	8.0	N/A
Turnout		5,328		N/A
Labour win (new seat)				
Labour win (new seat)				
Labour win (new seat)				

Little Horton
Party	Candidate	Votes	%	±%
Labour	T. Brown	2,923	75.1	N/A
Labour	A. Hameed	2,685		
Labour	K. Ryalls	2,672		
Conservative	V. Holdsworth	968	24.9	N/A
Conservative	B. Robinson	837		
Conservative	R. Robinson	800		
Majority		1,955	50.2	N/A
Turnout		3,891		N/A
Labour win (new seat)				
Labour win (new seat)				
Labour win (new seat)				

Odsal
Party	Candidate	Votes	%	±%
Labour	D. Bentley	2,734	57.0	N/A
Labour	J. Coope	2,552		
Labour	K. Parker	2,487		
Conservative	D. Mellor	2,065	43.0	N/A
Conservative	T. Hill	1,985		
Conservative	A. Rawnsley	1,966		
Majority		669	13.9	N/A
Turnout		4,799		N/A
Labour win (new seat)				
Labour win (new seat)				
Labour win (new seat)				

Queensbury
Party	Candidate	Votes	%	±%
Conservative	I. Cookland	2,438	51.2	N/A
Conservative	J. Hirst	2,363		
Labour	J. Smith	2,323	48.8	N/A
Labour	H. Alpin	2,320		
Conservative	J. Rees	2,238		
Labour	L. Woodward	2,201		
Majority		115	2.4	N/A
Turnout		4,761		N/A
Conservative win (new seat)				
Conservative win (new seat)				
Labour win (new seat)				

Rombalds
Party	Candidate	Votes	%	±%
Conservative	W. Clavering	2,942	56.9	N/A
Conservative	K. Emsley	2,876		
Conservative	A. Raistrick	2,702		
Liberal	C. Svensgaard	931	18.0	N/A
Labour	L. Fox	817	15.8	N/A
Labour	D. Warwick	809		
Liberal	K. Powell	774		
Labour	A. Pisacane	735		
Liberal	V. Whelan	732		
Ecology	P. Burnell	476	9.2	N/A
Majority		2,011	38.9	N/A
Turnout		5,166		N/A
Conservative win (new seat)				
Conservative win (new seat)				
Conservative win (new seat)				

Shipley East
Party	Candidate	Votes	%	±%
Labour	N. Free	3,008	62.9	N/A
Labour	E. Saville	2,916		
Labour	C. Hunter	2,780		
Conservative	R. Wright	1,121	23.5	N/A
Conservative	A. Shutt	1,050		
Conservative	P. Barker	996		
Liberal	D. Atkinson	399	8.3	N/A
Liberal	R. Barker	368		
Ecology	K. Taylor	251	5.3	N/A
Ecology	C. Ormondroyd	237		
Ecology	P. Dean	195		
Majority		1,887	39.5	N/A
Turnout		4,779		N/A
Labour win (new seat)				
Labour win (new seat)				
Labour win (new seat)				

Shipley West
Party	Candidate	Votes	%	±%
Conservative	O. Messer	3,138	54.1	N/A
Conservative	J. Evans	3,122		
Conservative	S. Arthur	3,089		
Labour	M. Ryan	1,984	34.2	N/A
Labour	J. Jones	1,912		
Labour	K. Trobridge	1,845		
Liberal	G. Roberts	683	11.8	N/A
Liberal	R. Cole	617		
Majority		1,154	19.9	N/A
Turnout		5,805		N/A
Conservative win (new seat)				
Conservative win (new seat)				
Conservative win (new seat)				

Thornton
Party	Candidate	Votes	%	±%
Labour	I. Wassell	2,056	44.8	N/A
Conservative	E. Kinder	2,048	44.6	N/A
Labour	A. Heaney	2,035		
Conservative	D. Downey	2,019		
Labour	B. Draxler	1,969		
Conservative	R. Smith	1,966		
Liberal	D. Garrad	486	10.6	N/A
Liberal	N. Baggley	479		
Liberal	L. Baggley	453		
Majority		8	0.2	N/A
Turnout		4,590		N/A
Labour win (new seat)				
Conservative win (new seat)				
Labour win (new seat)				

Toller
Party	Candidate	Votes	%	±%
Labour	G. Armitage	2,379	50.0	N/A
Conservative	A. Pollard	2,378	50.0	N/A
Labour	H. Baines	2,314		
Conservative	D. Barker	2,306		
Conservative	B. Curtis	2,289		
Labour	A. Spiers	2,272		
Majority		1	0.0	N/A
Turnout		4,757		N/A
Labour win (new seat)				
Conservative win (new seat)				
Labour win (new seat)				

Tong
Party	Candidate	Votes	%	±%
Labour	J. Senior	2,795	77.7	N/A
Labour	T. Mahon	2,698		
Labour	D. Smith	2,632		
Conservative	V. Owen	800	22.3	N/A
Conservative	J. Butterfield	764		
Majority		1,995	55.5	N/A
Turnout		3,595		N/A
Labour win (new seat)				
Labour win (new seat)				
Labour win (new seat)				

Undercliffe
Party	Candidate	Votes	%	±%
Labour	G. Goodyear	2,637	60.4	N/A
Labour	E. Haslan	2,559		
Labour	R. Sowman	2,456		
Conservative	H. Ibbotson	1,727	39.6	N/A
Conservative	D. Davison	1,701		
Conservative	A. Craig	1,600		
Majority		910	20.8	N/A
Turnout		4,364		N/A
Labour win (new seat)				
Labour win (new seat)				
Labour win (new seat)				

University
Party	Candidate	Votes	%	±%
Labour	M. Ajeeb	3,911	80.7	N/A
Labour	D. Coughlin	3,717		
Labour	I. Queriski	3,597		
Conservative	D. Baggley	933	19.3	N/A
Conservative	M. Qureshi	771		
Conservative	Z. Khan	734		
Majority		2,978	61.5	N/A
Turnout		4,844		N/A
Labour win (new seat)				
Labour win (new seat)				
Labour win (new seat)				

Wibsey
Party	Candidate	Votes	%	±%
Conservative	F. Hillam	2,193	51.2	N/A
Labour	F. Bastow	2,087	48.8	N/A
Labour	A. Corina	2,020		
Conservative	A. Hodgson	2,016		
Labour	L. Kearns	1,995		
Conservative	H. Thorne	1,902		
Majority		106	2.5	N/A
Turnout		4,280		N/A
Conservative win (new seat)				
Labour win (new seat)				
Labour win (new seat)				

Worth Valley
Party	Candidate	Votes	%	±%
Conservative	G. Hodgson	2,270	52.2	N/A
Conservative	Eric Pickles	2,229		
Conservative	S. Midgley	2,210		
Labour	C. Foster	1,475	33.9	N/A
Labour	S. Cliff	1,475		
Labour	H. Laws	1,436		
Liberal	M. Kershaw	604	13.9	N/A
Majority		795	18.3	N/A
Turnout		4,349		N/A
Conservative win (new seat)				
Conservative win (new seat)				
Conservative win (new seat)				

Wyke
Party	Candidate	Votes	%	±%
Labour	D. Birdsall	2,990	64.2	N/A
Labour	B. Lynch	2,664		
Labour	D. Mangham	2,654		
Conservative	H. Midgley	1,665	35.8	N/A
Conservative	R. George	1,585		
Conservative	D. Owen	1,448		
Majority		1,325	28.5	N/A
Turnout		4,655		N/A
Labour win (new seat)				
Labour win (new seat)				
Labour win (new seat)				
