= 1978 City of Bradford Metropolitan District Council election =

Elections to City of Bradford Metropolitan District Council were held on 4 May 1978, with one third of council up for election as well as an extra vacancy in Shipley: Central, North & East. The election resulted in the Conservatives retaining control with voter turnout at 38.3%.

== Election result ==
Bradford local election result 1978
Party	Seats	Gains	Losses	Net gain/loss	Seats %	Votes %	Votes	+/−
Conservative	18	1	2	-1	56.2	49.2	61,930	+0.8%
Labour	13	2	0	+2	40.6	38.7	48,771	+4.5%
Liberal	1	0	1	-1	3.1	8.8	11,110	+0.9%
National Front	0	0	0	0	0.0	2.1	2,619	-5.2%
Independent	0	0	0	0	0.0	0.6	790	+0.6%
Socialist Unity	0	0	0	0	0.0	0.4	456	+0.4%
Independent Labour	0	0	0	0	0.0	0.2	204	+0.2%

This result had the following consequences for the total number of seats on the council after the elections:

Party	Previous council	New council
Conservatives	61	60
Labour	26	28
Liberals	5	4
Independent Labour	1	1
Total	93	93
Working majority	29	27

== Ward results ==
Allerton
Party	Candidate	Votes	%	±%
Conservative	Barbara Curtis	2,803	58.4	+6.4
Labour	J. Whiteside	1,529	31.9	−2.3
Liberal	K. Buckley	361	7.5	+1.1
National Front	A. Smith	106	2.2	−5.2
Majority		1,274	26.5	+8.7
Turnout		4,799	36.1	−5.1
Conservative hold		Swing	+4.3	

Baildon
Party	Candidate	Votes	%	±%
Conservative	A. Lightowler	2,989	55.9	+3.0
Labour	P. Clarke	1,320	24.7	+6.7
Liberal	Kathleen Greenwood	1,040	19.4	−9.7
Majority		1,669	31.2	+7.4
Turnout		5,349	46.7	+0.9
Conservative hold		Swing	-1.8	

Bingley: Central, East, North & West
Party	Candidate	Votes	%	±%
Conservative	A. Chapman	3,139	62.2	+0.6
Labour	B. Lynch	1,311	26.0	+5.8
Liberal	I. Ross	598	11.8	−6.4
Majority		1,828	36.2	−5.2
Turnout		5,048	41.8	−3.8
Conservative hold		Swing	-2.6	

Bolton
Party	Candidate	Votes	%	±%
Conservative	E. Wooler	1,748	47.8	+5.5
Labour	E. Steed	1,381	37.7	+9.8
Liberal	J. Moran	415	11.3	−6.9
National Front	Elsie Barcook	116	3.2	−8.4
Majority		367	10.0	−4.3
Turnout		3,660	34.5	−2.8
Conservative hold		Swing	-2.1	

Bowling
Party	Candidate	Votes	%	±%
Labour	B. Kearns	1,551	60.1	+14.1
Conservative	D. Conquest	917	35.5	−0.9
National Front	S. Collins	113	4.4	−13.2
Majority		634	24.6	+15.0
Turnout		2,581	33.5	+1.4
Labour hold		Swing	+7.5	

Bradford Moor
Party	Candidate	Votes	%	±%
Labour	Walter Johnson	2,295	49.7	+2.9
Conservative	Dorothy Tyler	1,672	36.2	+3.3
Socialist Unity	R. Goldberg	456	9.9	+9.9
National Front	S. Wood	194	4.2	−16.1
Majority		623	13.5	−0.4
Turnout		4,617	42.5	−3.4
Labour hold		Swing	-0.2	

Clayton, Ambler Thorn & Queensbury
Party	Candidate	Votes	%	±%
Conservative	Irene Cookland	3,566	61.8	+5.9
Labour	D. Hopkins	2,040	35.4	+2.1
National Front	Joan Wood	164	2.8	−5.5
Majority		1,526	26.4	+3.8
Turnout		5,770	35.1	−3.4
Conservative hold		Swing	+1.9	

Craven: Silsden, Addingham, Kildwick & Steeton with Eastburn
Party	Candidate	Votes	%	±%
Conservative	J. Barker	2,299	59.1	−13.0
Labour	D. Wright	1,509	38.8	+10.9
National Front	Alice Fairew	82	2.1	+2.1
Majority		790	20.3	−23.9
Turnout		3,890	40.7	−7.8
Conservative hold		Swing	-11.9	

Denholme, Cullingworth, Bingley South & Wilsden
Party	Candidate	Votes	%	±%
Conservative	Emily Hall	3,277	74.1	−5.7
Labour	Pauline Wall	817	18.5	−1.7
Liberal	Susan Clemence	329	7.4	+7.4
Majority		2,460	55.6	−3.9
Turnout		4,423	42.4	+2.4
Conservative hold		Swing	-2.0	

Eccleshill
Party	Candidate	Votes	%	±%
Conservative	S. Swallow	1,805	45.5	+5.0
Labour	A. Dewhirst	1,710	43.1	+8.2
Liberal	P. Sugden	340	8.6	−6.4
National Front	T. Hawthorn	113	2.8	−6.8
Majority		95	2.4	−3.1
Turnout		3,968	37.7	−0.6
Conservative gain from Liberal		Swing	-1.6	

Great Horton
Party	Candidate	Votes	%	±%
Conservative	A. Dennison	2,154	49.5	−2.9
Labour	R. Stork	2,057	47.3	+10.7
National Front	A. Cureton	136	3.1	−7.8
Majority		97	2.2	−13.6
Turnout		4,347	41.2	−1.3
Conservative hold		Swing	-6.8	

Haworth, Oakworth & Oxenhope
Party	Candidate	Votes	%	±%
Conservative	G. Hodgson	2,497	56.7	−9.7
Labour Co-op	H. Binns	1,496	34.0	+0.4
Liberal	H. Mortimer	407	9.2	+9.2
Majority		1,001	22.7	−10.1
Turnout		4,400	37.6	−0.4
Conservative hold		Swing	-5.0	

Heaton
Party	Candidate	Votes	%	±%
Conservative	J. King	2,775	57.3	−2.0
Labour	M. Ajeeb	1,527	31.5	+6.6
Liberal	Mary Howard	392	8.1	+1.6
National Front	G. Wright	150	3.1	−6.2
Majority		1,248	25.8	−8.6
Turnout		4,844	44.5	+2.0
Conservative hold		Swing	-4.3	

Idle
Party	Candidate	Votes	%	±%
Liberal	P. Hockney	3,863	93.6	+59.0
National Front	A. Farrow	264	6.4	−1.8
Majority		3,599	87.2	+85.0
Turnout		4,127	35.4	−5.1
Liberal hold		Swing	+28.6	

Ilkley: Ben Rhydding, Ilkley North, South & West
Party	Candidate	Votes	%	±%
Conservative	E. Wright	2,797	71.2	+20.2
Liberal	Rebecca Jones	1,130	28.8	+28.8
Majority		1,667	42.4	+40.3
Turnout		3,927	40.3	−6.2
Conservative hold		Swing	-4.3	

Ilkley: Burley, Holme & Menston
Party	Candidate	Votes	%	±%
Conservative	D. Smith	2,443	63.5	−1.0
Labour	C. Hunter	852	22.1	+9.4
Liberal	Carton Svensgaard	552	14.3	−8.4
Majority		1,591	41.4	−0.5
Turnout		3,847	49.5	+4.4
Conservative hold		Swing	-5.2	

Keighley: Keighley Central, East & South
Party	Candidate	Votes	%	±%
Labour	H. Peacock	2,332	52.7	+6.1
Conservative	D. Robertshaw	1,682	38.0	−2.4
Liberal	Judith Brooksbank	301	6.8	+0.5
National Front	J. Dawson	106	2.4	−4.2
Majority		650	14.7	+8.4
Turnout		4,421	41.4	+0.5
Labour hold		Swing	+4.2	

Keighley: Morton & Keighley North East
Party	Candidate	Votes	%	±%
Conservative	J. Womersley	1,542	50.0	−15.2
Labour	S. Bowen	908	29.5	+2.9
Liberal	G. Sims	548	17.8	+17.8
National Front	Kate Ingham	83	2.7	−5.5
Majority		634	20.6	−18.2
Turnout		3,081	40.1	−1.0
Conservative hold		Swing	-9.1	

Keighley: North West & West
Party	Candidate	Votes	%	±%
Labour	B. Thorne	2,465	49.1	+7.6
Conservative	Hilda Harrison	2,447	48.8	+2.6
National Front	K. O'Neill	105	2.1	−4.1
Majority		18	0.4	−4.2
Turnout		5,017	42.7	−1.6
Labour hold		Swing	+2.5	

Laisterdyke
Party	Candidate	Votes	%	±%
Labour	J. Fieldhouse	1,670	68.0	+10.6
Conservative	H. Thorne	786	32.0	+2.7
Majority		884	36.0	+7.9
Turnout		2,456	32.0	−0.5
Labour hold		Swing	+3.9	

Little Horton
Party	Candidate	Votes	%	±%
Labour	A. Hameed	1,449	45.8	−11.8
Conservative	Kathleen Warrilow	1,024	32.4	+1.2
Liberal	N. Baggley	346	10.9	+10.9
Independent Labour	M. Mirza	204	6.4	+6.4
National Front	G. Brown	140	4.4	−6.8
Majority		425	13.4	−13.0
Turnout		3,163	28.6	−0.7
Labour hold		Swing	-6.5	

Manningham
Party	Candidate	Votes	%	±%
Labour	H. Baines	2,109	54.5	+5.2
Conservative	S. Bailey	1,093	28.2	−9.7
Independent	R. Shahid	369	9.5	+9.5
Liberal	Anne Smithson	167	4.3	+4.3
National Front	R. Fairey	134	3.5	−7.5
Majority		1,016	26.2	+14.9
Turnout		3,872	36.3	+1.8
Labour gain from Conservative		Swing	+7.4	

Odsal
Party	Candidate	Votes	%	±%
Conservative	M. Medler	2,196	59.0	+4.9
Labour	J. Bruce	1,524	41.0	+4.0
Majority		672	18.1	+0.9
Turnout		3,720	35.6	−5.3
Conservative hold		Swing	+0.4	

Shipley: Central, North & East
Party	Candidate	Votes	%	±%
Labour	N. Free	2,477	59.3	+9.6
Labour	B. Chadwick	2,465		
Conservative	D. Cooke	1,697	40.7	+2.2
Conservative	M. Hollings	1,694		
Majority		768	18.7	+7.4
Turnout		4,174	39.3	+4.1
Labour hold		Swing		
Labour hold		Swing	+3.7	

Shipley: South & West
Party	Candidate	Votes	%	±%
Conservative	S. Arthur	3,104	71.6	+1.3
Labour	P. Lancaster	1,233	28.4	−1.3
Majority		1,871	43.2	+2.6
Turnout		4,337	42.8	−3.4
Conservative hold		Swing	+1.3	

Thornton
Party	Candidate	Votes	%	±%
Conservative	G. Chapman	2,392	62.4	+14.6
Labour	R. Holroyde	1,146	29.9	+6.3
Liberal	J. Pearson	191	5.0	−7.5
National Front	F. Harris	103	2.7	−5.4
Majority		1,246	32.5	+8.3
Turnout		3,832	37.8	−4.0
Conservative hold		Swing	+4.1	

Tong
Party	Candidate	Votes	%	±%
Labour	J. Senior	2,160	64.8	+2.2
Conservative	J. Owen	1,047	31.4	+7.1
National Front	G. Robinson	127	3.8	−5.6
Majority		1,113	33.4	−4.9
Turnout		3,334	27.6	+0.4
Labour hold		Swing	-2.4	

Undercliffe
Party	Candidate	Votes	%	±%
Labour	G. Goodyear	1,932	53.6	+16.0
Conservative	M. Stanley	1,507	41.8	+1.7
National Front	D. Matson	165	4.6	−8.0
Majority		425	11.8	+9.3
Turnout		3,604	41.8	+1.0
Labour gain from Conservative		Swing	+7.1	

University
Party	Candidate	Votes	%	±%
Labour	M. Hussain	2,005	58.9	+16.5
Conservative	D. Baggley	747	22.0	−1.5
Independent	A. Patel	421	12.4	+12.4
Liberal	C. Hill	130	3.8	−18.6
National Front	T. Brown	99	2.9	−8.8
Majority		1,258	37.0	+18.0
Turnout		3,402	41.3	+1.7
Labour hold		Swing	+9.0	

Wibsey
Party	Candidate	Votes	%	±%
Conservative	F. Hillam	2,210	60.1	+12.5
Labour	F. Bastow	1,347	36.6	+6.5
National Front	D. Brown	119	3.2	−7.5
Majority		863	23.5	+6.0
Turnout		3,676	35.0	−1.5
Conservative hold		Swing	+3.0	

Wyke
Party	Candidate	Votes	%	±%
Labour	B. Seal	2,619	62.4	−16.2
Conservative	K. Porter	1,575	37.5	+37.5
Majority		1,044	24.9	−32.5
Turnout		4,194	35.5	+11.8
Labour hold		Swing	-26.9	
