= Listed buildings in Denholme =

Denholme is a civil parish in the metropolitan borough of the City of Bradford, West Yorkshire, England. It contains 17 listed buildings that are recorded in the National Heritage List for England. All the listed buildings are designated at Grade II, the lowest of the three grades, which is applied to "buildings of national importance and special interest". The parish contains the small town of Denholme and the surrounding countryside. The listed buildings consist of houses and cottages, farmhouses and farm buildings, three churches and associated structures, three mileposts, and a war memorial.

== Buildings ==
Name and location	Photograph	Date	Notes
Sand Beds Farmhouse; 53.81236°N 1.91335°W	—	1712	A stone farmhouse with quoins, a stone slate roof with chamfered coped gables and moulded kneelers, and two storeys. The central doorway, which is blocked, has a moulded surround and an ornamental lintel, and to the sides are later inserted doorways. The windows are mullioned, and at the rear is a mullioned and transomed window. Above the central doorway is an initialled and dated square plaque with a central roundel.
Upper Laithe Farmhouse; 53.80731°N 1.90009°W	—	1726	The farmhouse, which was extended in the 19th century, is in millstone grit, and has a stone slate roof with a chamfered coped left gable and cut kneelers. There are two storeys, and a continuous outshut at the rear. To the left is a gabled porch with a chamfered surround, a Tudor arched doorway, and an inscription above with initials and the date. The windows are mullioned, with some mullions missing.
Middle White Shaw Farmhouse; 53.80677°N 1.90530°W	—	1735	The farmhouse, which was altered in the 19th century, is in stone with quoins, and a stone slate roof with chamfered coped gables and cut kneelers. There are two storeys and three bays. The doorway has a moulded surround and an ornamental lintel, and the windows are mullioned. Above the doorway is an initialled and dated plaque with a round head, impost blocks and a keystone.
Gate House and White Cottage; 53.79293°N 1.89066°W	—	Early 18th century (probable)	A farmhouse, later altered, it is rendered, and has moulded gutter brackets, and a stone slate roof. There are two storeys and a single-storey extension to the left. In the centre is a porch, the windows are mullioned, and in the left gable apex is a blind lunette.
Buck Park Farmhouse; 53.81042°N 1.89266°W	—	Late 18th century	A stone farmhouse with quoins, moulded gutter brackets, and a stone slate roof with coped gables and cut kneelers. There are two storeys and a symmetrical front of three bays. The central doorway has an open triangular pediment, the outer bays contain three-light mullioned windows, and above the doorway is a round-arched window with a keystone and impost blocks.
Field Head House; 53.81266°N 1.90562°W	—	Late 18th century	A stone house with a moulded eaves cornice and a stone slate roof. There are two storeys and an attic, a symmetrical front of three bays, and flanking single-storey wings. In the centre, the doorway has engaged Doric columns, a semicircular fanlight, and an open triangular pediment, and the windows on the front are sashes. In each wing is a doorway with an architrave, and a niche. At the rear is a porch and the windows are mullioned. The left gable end contains a round-arched window and an oval window in the apex, and in the attic of the right gable end is a taking-in door.
Laburnum Cottage; 53.81312°N 1.90391°W	—	Late 18th century	A stone house with millstone grit quoins, and a stone slate roof with coped gables and cut kneelers. There are two storeys and three bays. Near the centre are two doorways, the windows in the outer bays are mullioned with three lights, the central light higher, and above the doorway is a round-arched window with impost blocks and a keystone.
Barn northeast of Upper Laithe Farmhouse; 53.80743°N 1.89980°W	—	Early 19th century (probable)	The barn, which has been converted for residential use, is in stone with a stone slate roof. In the centre is a segmental cart entry with a keystone, to the left is a round-arched window with a keystone and impost blocks, above it is a triangular vent, and flanking this are semicircular openings. At the rear, above the doorway is a Venetian window, and two square pitching holes converted into windows. In the gable end is a quatrefoil.
Denholme Clough Methodist Church; 53.78862°N 1.89392°W	—	1834	The church is in stone, and has a stone slate roof with coped gables on springers. There are two storeys, a symmetrical front of three bays, and a two-storey extension at the rear. On the front there is, in each bay and in both storeys, a round-arched window with a keystone, and flanking the central window are doorways with semicircular fanlights and keystones. Below the central window in the upper storey is an inscribed and dated plaque.
Spring Row; 53.80018°N 1.90788°W		Early to mid 19th century	A terrace of gritstone cottages with stone gutter brackets, a stone slate roof with coped gables on springers, and two storeys. To the left, garage doors have been inserted, and elsewhere each cottage has a doorway, above which is a single-light window, and to the left is a three-light mullioned window in each floor.
St Paul's Church; 53.79669°N 1.89267°W		1843–46	The church was designed by R. D. Chantrell in Early English style. It is built in gritstone with a Welsh slate roof, and consists of a nave with a clerestory, north and south aisles, a chancel with a north vestry, and a west steeple. The steeple has a three-stage tower with buttresses, a deep corbel table, and a broach spire with lucarnes. The windows are lancets with hood moulds.
Denholme United Reformed Church; 53.80628°N 1.89529°W		1844	The church, which was extended in 1896, is in sandstone, with a sill band and a Welsh slate roof. There are two storeys and a symmetrical front of three bays, with pilaster quoins and a pediment. On the front are two doorways approached by steps, with pilaster jambs and entablatures. In the upper storey is a three-light window flanked by single-light windows, all with round-arched heads and archivolts. Above the doorways is an inscribed and dated plaque, and in the tympanum of the pediment is an oculus. Along the sides are six bays, with square-headed ground floor windows, and round-headed windows in the upper floor.
Wall and piers, St Paul's Church; 53.79659°N 1.89310°W	—	1846 (probable)	The wall and piers are in gritstone. Flanking the entrance to the churchyard are square gate piers with gabled caps. Curving walls with moulded coping link these with end piers that are similar to the gate piers, but smaller.
Milepost north of junction with Thornton Road; 53.78504°N 1.89483°W	—	Late 19th century	The milepost is on the east side of Halifax Road (A629 road). It consists of a stone that has a triangular section and a rounded top with a cast iron front. The upper part is inscribed "KEIGHLEY & HALIFAX ROAD" and "DENHOLME", and on the sides are the distances to Denholme, Halifax and Keighley.
Milepost east of junction with Long Causeway; 53.79744°N 1.89692°W		Late 19th century	The milepost is on the south side of Halifax Road (A629 road). It consists of a stone that has a triangular section and a rounded top with a cast iron front. The upper part is inscribed "KEIGHLEY & HALIFAX ROAD" and "DENHOLME", and on the sides are the distances to Denholme, Halifax and Keighley.
Milepost opposite 2 Sunny Dale; 53.80767°N 1.89654°W		Late 19th century	The milepost is on the northeast side of Keighley Road (A629 road). It consists of a stone that has a triangular section and a rounded top with a cast iron front. The upper part is inscribed "KEIGHLEY & HALIFAX ROAD" and "DENHOLME", and on the sides are the distances to Denholme, Halifax and Keighley.
War memorial 53.80138°N 1.89172°W		c. 1920	The war memorial in Foster Park consists of a bronze statue of a soldier standing on a two-stage rock-faced granite base with a cornice on a podium of three steps. On the front of the memorial is an inscription, and on the other faces are bronze tablets with the names of those lost in the two World Wars.
