= City of Bradford Metropolitan District Council =

Local government body in England

- Coat of arms

- Council logo

Type
- Type: Metropolitan district council of the City of Bradford

History
- Founded: 1 April 1974

Leadership
- Lord Mayor: Chris Herd, Conservative since 19 May 2026
- Leader: Stephen Place, Reform UK since 19 May 2026
- Chief Executive: Lorraine O'Donnell since 2023

Structure
- Seats: 90 councillors
- Graph of the party split among 90 seats.
- Political groups: Minority administration (27) Reform (27) Other parties (63) Conservative (18) Labour (17) Your Bradford Ind. (10) Green (9) Liberal Democrats (4) Independent (5)
- Joint committees: West Yorkshire Combined Authority

Elections
- Last election: 7 May 2026
- Next election: 6 May 2027

Meeting place
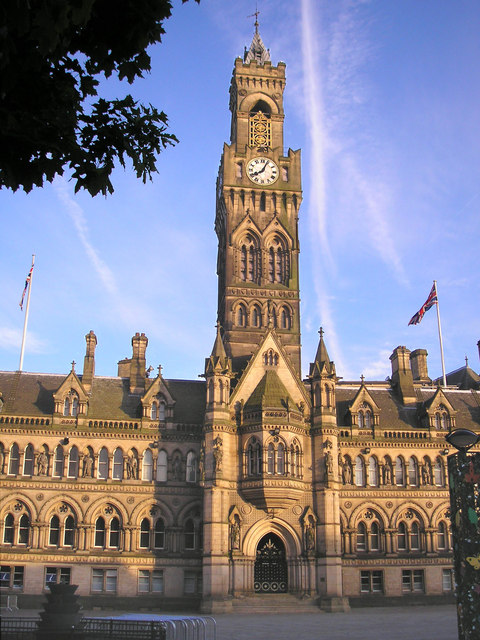
- City Hall, Centenary Square, Bradford, BD1 1HY

Website
- www.bradford.gov.uk

City of Bradford Metropolitan District Council is the local authority of the City of Bradford in West Yorkshire, England. Bradford has had an elected council since 1847, which has been reformed on several occasions. Since 1974 it has been a metropolitan district council. It provides the majority of local government services in the city. The council has been a constituent member of the West Yorkshire Combined Authority since 2014.

The council went under no overall control at the 2026 election. Reform UK are the largest party and run the council as a minority administration. The council meets at Bradford City Hall and has its main offices at Britannia House.

== History ==
The town of Bradford had been governed by improvement commissioners from 1793. It was incorporated as a municipal borough in 1847, after which it was governed by a body formally called the "mayor, aldermen and burgesses of the borough of Bradford", generally known as the corporation or town council. When elected county councils were established in 1889, Bradford was considered large enough to provide its own county-level services and so it was made a county borough, independent from the new West Riding County Council. The borough boundaries were enlarged several times between 1847 and 1974. Bradford was awarded city status in 1897, after which the corporation was also known as the city council. On 16 September 1907 the council was granted the right to appoint a lord mayor.

The modern metropolitan district and its council were in 1974 under the Local Government Act 1972. The new district covered the whole area of eight former districts and parts of another two, which were all abolished at the same time:

- Baildon Urban District
- Bingley Urban District
- Bradford County Borough
- Denholme Urban District
- Ilkley Urban District
- Keighley Municipal Borough
- Queensbury and Shelf Urban District (Queensbury only; Shelf went to Calderdale)
- Shipley Urban District
- Silsden Urban District
- Skipton Rural District (parishes of Addingham, Kildwick and Steeton with Eastburn only)

Bradford's city status and lord mayoralty were transferred to the whole of the new district on the day the new system came into force. As such the council could call itself "Bradford City Council", which name is sometimes used for it in official documents and the media, but the council styles itself "City of Bradford Metropolitan District Council" instead.

Between 1974 and 1986 the council was a lower tier district-level authority, with county-level functions being provided by West Yorkshire County Council. The county council was abolished in 1986, with Bradford taking on the county council's former functions in the area.

In March 2006, the UK's Audit Commission issued a report "in the public interest" regarding concerns about the procurement process for the acquisition of an asset management system. The report identified weaknesses in the Council's programme management and procurement processes, which the Council accepted "without reservation".

In 2012 a referendum was held on whether to introduce a directly elected mayor for Bradford; the proposal was rejected, with 55% of the votes being against it. Since 2014 the council has been a constituent member of the West Yorkshire Combined Authority. The combined authority has been led by the directly elected Mayor of West Yorkshire since 2021.

== Political control ==
The council went under no overall control at the May 2026 election. Reform were the largest party following that election, and subsequently formed a minority administration to run the council.

Political control of the council since the 1974 reforms took effect has been as follows:

Party in control	Years
Conservative	1974–1980
Labour	1980–1982
No overall control	1982–1986
Labour	1986–1988
No overall control	1988–1990
Labour	1990–2000
No overall control	2000–2014
Labour	2014–2026
No overall control	2026–present

=== Leadership ===
The role of Lord Mayor is largely ceremonial in Bradford. Political leadership is instead provided by the leader of the council. The leaders since 1974 have been:

Councillor	Party	From	To
John Singleton	Conservative	1974	1979
Brian Womersley	Conservative	1979	1980
Derek Smith	Labour	1980	1982
Tom Hall	Conservative	1982	1984
Ronnie Farley	Conservative	1984	1986
Phil Beeley	Labour	1986	1988
Eric Pickles	Conservative	1988	1990
Tommy Flanagan	Labour	1990	1992
Gerry Sutcliffe	Labour	1992	1994
Tony Cairns	Labour	1994	1997
John Ryan	Labour	1997	1998
Ian Greenwood	Labour	1998	2000
Margaret Eaton	Conservative	2000	2006
Kris Hopkins	Conservative	2006	May 2010
Ian Greenwood	Labour	25 May 2010	May 2012
David Green	Labour	22 May 2012	May 2016
Susan Hinchcliffe	Labour	17 May 2016	May 2026
Stephen Place	Reform	19 May 2026	

=== Composition ===
Following the 2026 election, and subsequent changes to June 2026, the composition of the council was:

Party	Seats
Reform	28
Conservative	18
Labour	17
Your Bradford Independent Group (Note: The Your Bradford Independent Group is formally registered as a political party with the Electoral Commission.)	10
Green	9
Liberal Democrats	4
Independent	4
Total	90

The next election is due in 2027, in which one-third of the council's seats will be up for election.

== Elections ==
Since the last boundary changes took effect for the 2026 election, the council has comprised 90 councillors representing 30 wards, with each ward electing three councillors. Elections are held three years out of every four, with a third of the council (one councillor for each ward) being elected each time for a four year term of office.

=== Parliamentary constituencies ===
The district is currently covered by five constituencies with six wards in each constituency: Bradford East, Bradford South, Bradford West, Keighley and Shipley.

== Premises ==
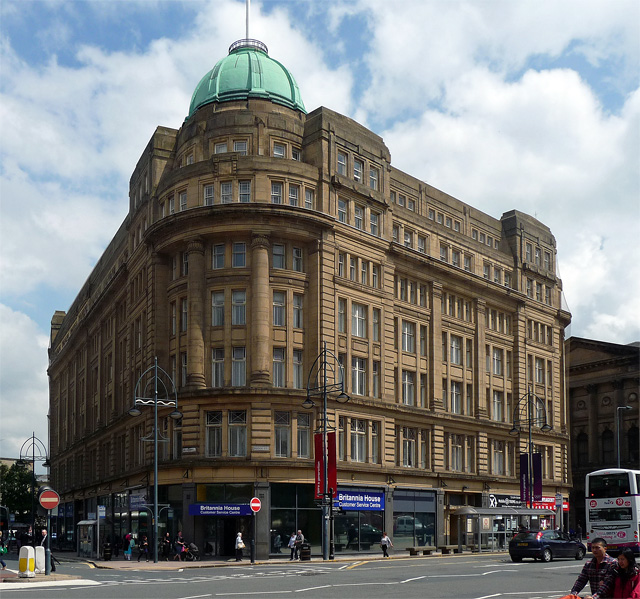
Britannia House, Hall Ings: Council's main offices

The council meets at Bradford City Hall on Centenary Square in the city centre, which had been completed in 1873 for the old borough council. The council's main offices are nearby in Britannia House on Hall Ings.

== Services ==
=== Bradford District Museums & Galleries ===
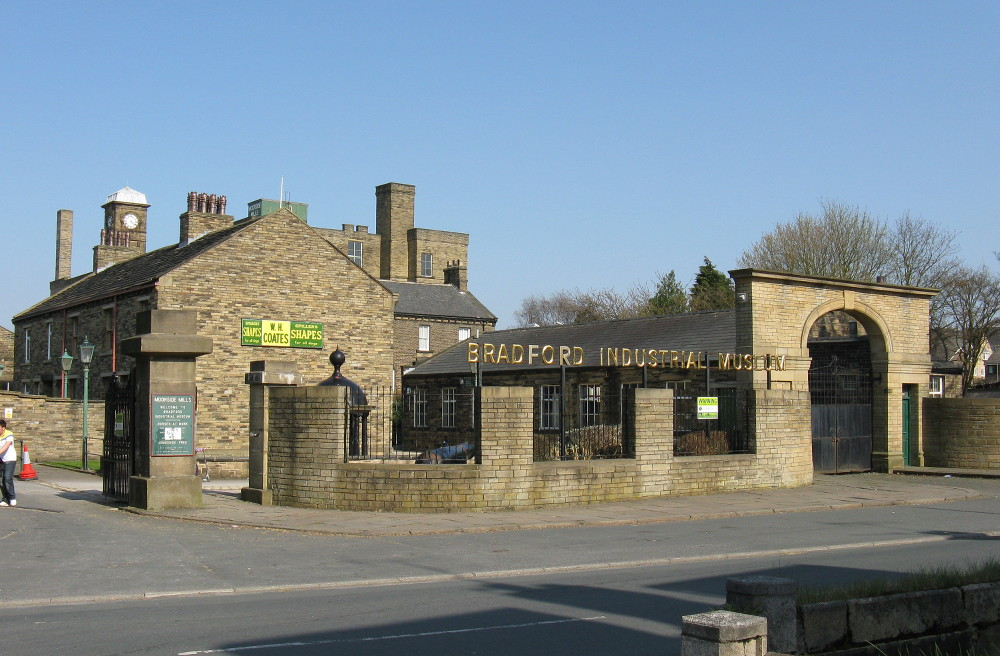
Bradford Industrial Museum entrance

Bradford District Museums & Galleries is a service of the council that runs a number of visitor attractions in the Bradford District.

The attractions include:

- Bolling Hall Museum, Bradford
- Bradford Industrial Museum, Eccleshill
- Cartwright Hall Art Gallery, Bradford
- Cliffe Castle Museum and Park, Keighley

The organisation also has a photograph archive ("Photos Bradford District"), which is accessible online.
