= Denholme =

Town and civil parish in West Yorkshire, England

Coordinates: 53.802°N 1.894°W

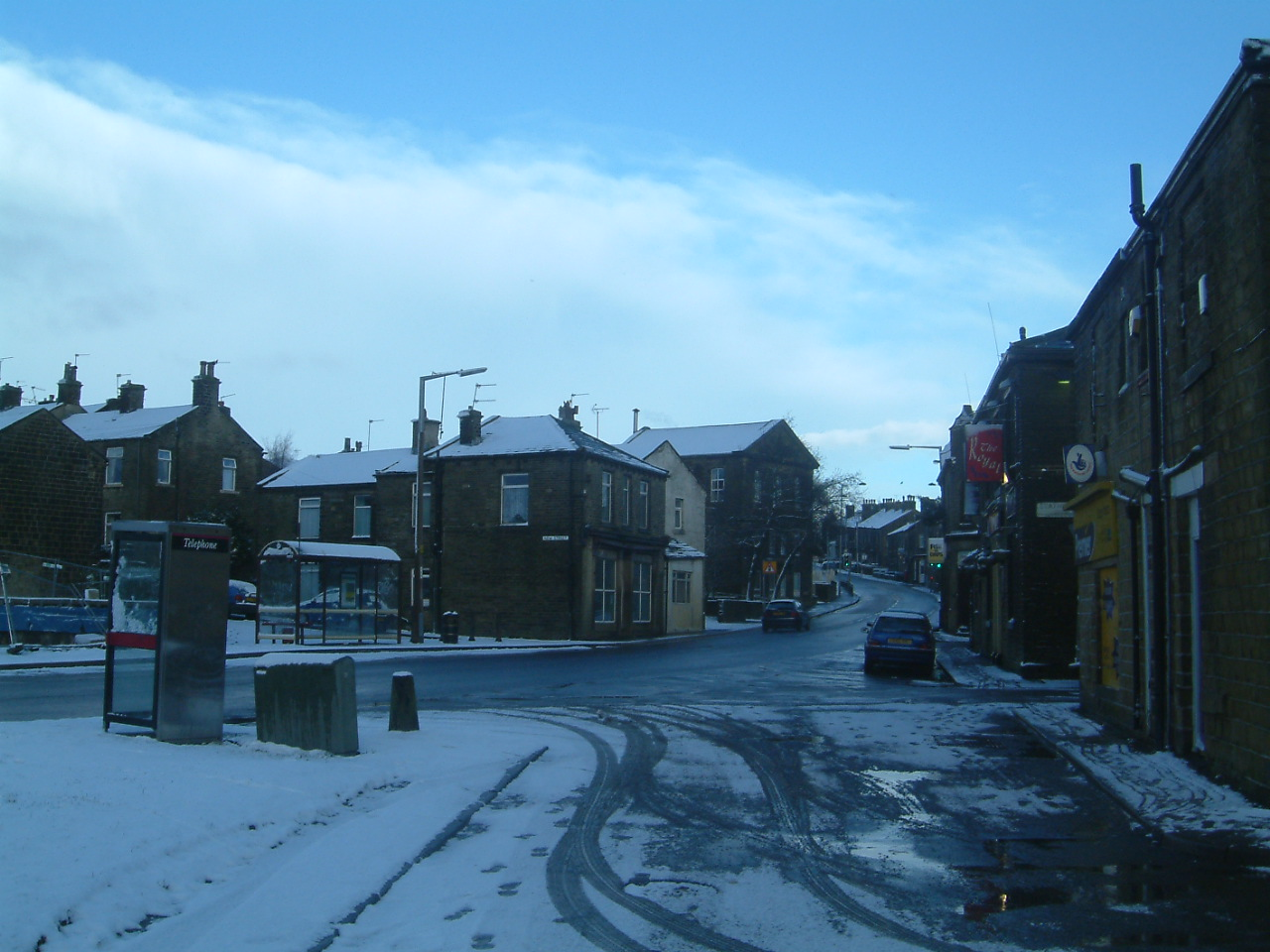
- Christmas Day in Denholme 2004

- Location within West Yorkshire
- Population: 3,489 (2011 census)
- OS grid reference: SE070340
- Civil parish: Denholme
- Metropolitan borough: City of Bradford
- Metropolitan county: West Yorkshire
- Region: Yorkshire and the Humber
- Country: England
- Sovereign state: United Kingdom
- Post town: BRADFORD
- Postcode district: BD13
- Dialling code: 01274
- Police: West Yorkshire
- Fire: West Yorkshire
- Ambulance: Yorkshire
- UK Parliament: Shipley

Denholme is a town and civil parish in the Bradford Metropolitan Borough, West Yorkshire, England. It is 8 miles (13 km) west of Bradford, 7 miles (11 km) from Keighley and roughly the same distance from Halifax. Administratively, it is part of the Bingley Rural ward of the City of Bradford. Denholme had a population of 2,976 in 2001, this had increased to 3,489 at the 2011 Census.

== History ==
The name Denholme is probably of Viking origin, translating to "A flat amongst the hillside". This is a good description of the town's geographical setting, since it is located in a broad side valley extending southwards from that of the River Aire - the Aire Valley or Airedale. However, an alternative suggestion of the word "Holme", in old Viking Danelaw, would be that of reclaimed marshland (or an "island" in a wet area) and Den or Denu, in Old English, means Valley. This would also make sense given the areas many springs, marshy terrain and situation in a valley. Denholme is also on the eastern flank of the Pennines, commonly known as the "backbone of England", about midway along their length.

The town sits on the old Roman Road from Manchester (Mamucium or Mancunium) to Ilkley (Olicana) though there is no evidence of any settlement then. The line of the road is visible on the ground to the south of the town, not far from St Paul's church.

The first evidence of habitation in the area dates from the 13th century. There is a grant of land, dated 1239, whereby Thomas de Thornton gave grazing land at Denholme to the monks of Byland Abbey. It is likely that the monks would have built a grange in the area and this may well have given the town its first occupants.

The entire Victorian housing sites of Denholme were built by the Fosters who also built the old textile mills of Denholme. The houses were for the workers of the mills. It was common in Victorian England for wealthy businessmen to build entire towns to house the workers of their mills.

Denholme railway station opened on 1 January 1884, closing to passengers on 23 May 1955 and closed completely on 10 April 1961 when sometime after most of its buildings were demolished. The railway was built by the Great Northern Railway (GNR) and linked Bradford, Keighley and Halifax via a triangular junction at Queensbury. The Queensbury lines and station transferred to the London & North Eastern Railway and, ultimately, to the North Eastern Region of British Railways before closure. At 850 feet (259 m) above sea level, Denholme was the highest station on the entire GNR system. The line was mostly rural and needed the construction of many earthworks, viaducts and tunnels. Its hilly nature earned it the nicknames of "the Alpine route" or "the switchback" from its drivers.

The original mills around which the town grew have now gone, though their sites have been partially re-used for light industry. Recent years have seen the closure of the bulk of the remaining manufacturing industry in the town, including specialised textiles, joinery and constructional timber. Whilst there are still employment opportunities in the shops, schools and other town services, or on the surrounding farms, the majority of working residents now commute to Bradford, Keighley, Halifax or Leeds.

== Geology ==
The Denholme Clough Fault is a small geological fault that runs over the moors from Leeming near Oxenhope and onto Thornton Moor. The fault travels in a rough north-west to south-east direction.

== Education ==
There is a primary school. The neighbouring hamlet of Keelham also has a primary school and some children from the town attend there.

The nearest high school is Parkside School, Cullingworth, 2.5 miles (4 km) away.

== Landmarks ==
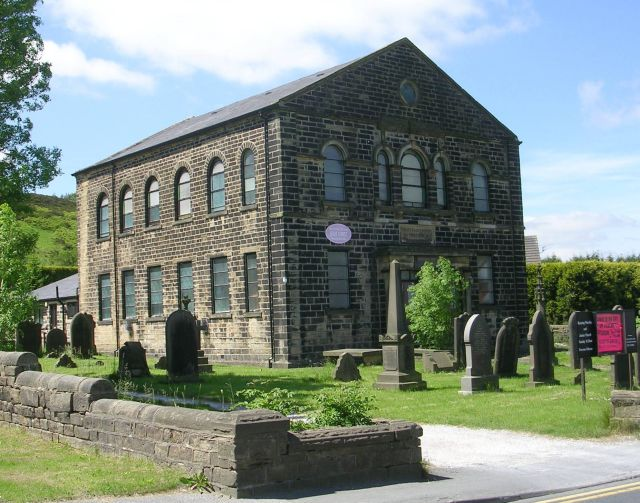
Denholme Shared Church, built 1844 as Denholme Independent Chapel, seen in 2008

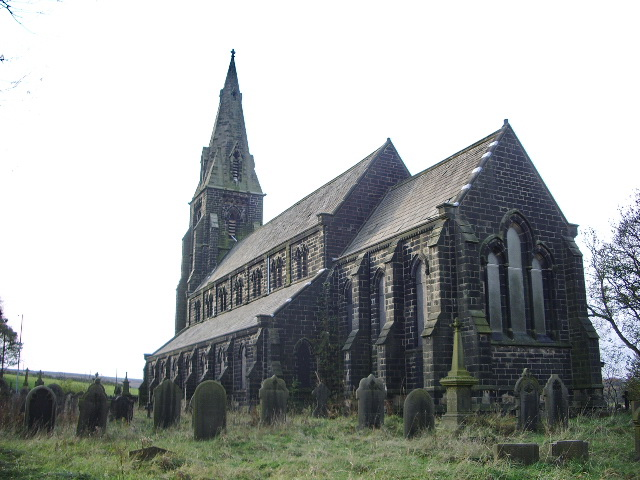
St Paul's Church, now in residential use

Denholme Shared Church is "a partnership of three denominations - Baptist, United Reformed and the Church of England", occupying the former United Reformed Church, which is a grade II listed building. The former parish church of St Paul, and the former Denholme Clough Methodist Church, both also grade II listed, have been converted for residential use, the former featuring in BBC show Homes Under the Hammer.

There is also a library in the Mechanics Institute, and a Conservative Social Club. Services include a doctor's surgery, a pharmacy a sheltered housing provision. There is also a public park - Foster Park - which was given to the people of Denholme in 1922 by William Foster.

The town has a selection of shops - food, non-food and fast food, two pubs - the Royal and the New Inn, a post office, a charity shop and a farm shop. Foster Park houses a youth cafe, skate area, basketball court, bowling green and the town War Memorial. Just to the east of Denholme is Doe Park Reservoir, where there is fishing, a water activities centre and a sailing club.

== Transport ==
The main road running through Denholme is the A629. The town is on regular bus routes between Keighley and Bradford and with occasional services to Halifax.

== Events ==
There is a Children's Gala (fair) every year held in Foster Park, usually held on the first Saturday of July.

== Sport ==
Denholme has two cricket teams, Denholme Cricket Club and Denholme Clough Cricket Club, who each have their own grounds. Denholme Cricket Club play in the Craven and District Cricket League and have a first and second 11 along with several junior teams. Denholme Cricket club 1XI play in the 2nd division of this league and the 2nd XI were promoted to division 4. Denholme Clough Cricket Club play in the Towergate Halifax Cricket League - Terry Wynne.

Denholme has a football team, Denholme United AFC, who play home games at Foster Park. They are currently the Halifax and District Football League Division 1 champions. Denholme also have their own bowls team.

== See also ==
- Listed buildings in Denholme
