= Royds, Bradford =

Ward in the City of Bradford, West Yorkshire, England

Coordinates: 53.753°N 1.762°W

Royds
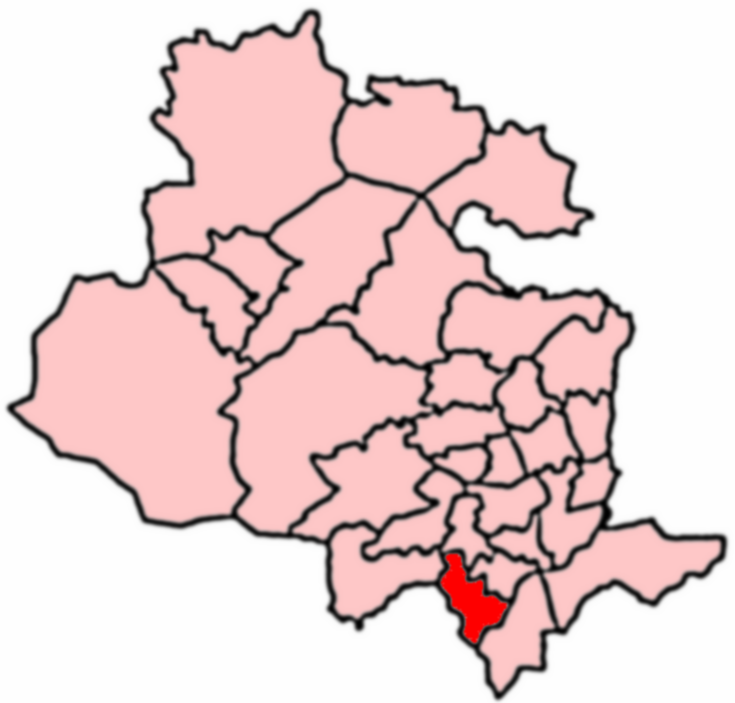
- 2004 Boundaries of Royds Ward
- Population: 17,360 (2011. Ward)
- UK Parliament: Bradford South
- Councillors: Ruth Wood (Labour); Angela Tait (Labour); Andrew Thornton (Labour)

Royds (population 16,350 - 2001 UK census) is a ward within the City of Bradford Metropolitan District Council in the county of West Yorkshire, England. The population at the 2011 Census was 17,360.

Starting from the north end of Royds, the areas covered are Horton Bank Bottom which is shared with Great Horton Ward, then Buttershaw which makes the bulk of the ward, then a portion of the south-west side of Wibsey village. South of Halifax Road is Woodside, east of which is part of Low Moor village, the rest of which is in Wyke ward. At the south end of the ward is the more rural hamlet of Royds Hall.

== Councillors ==
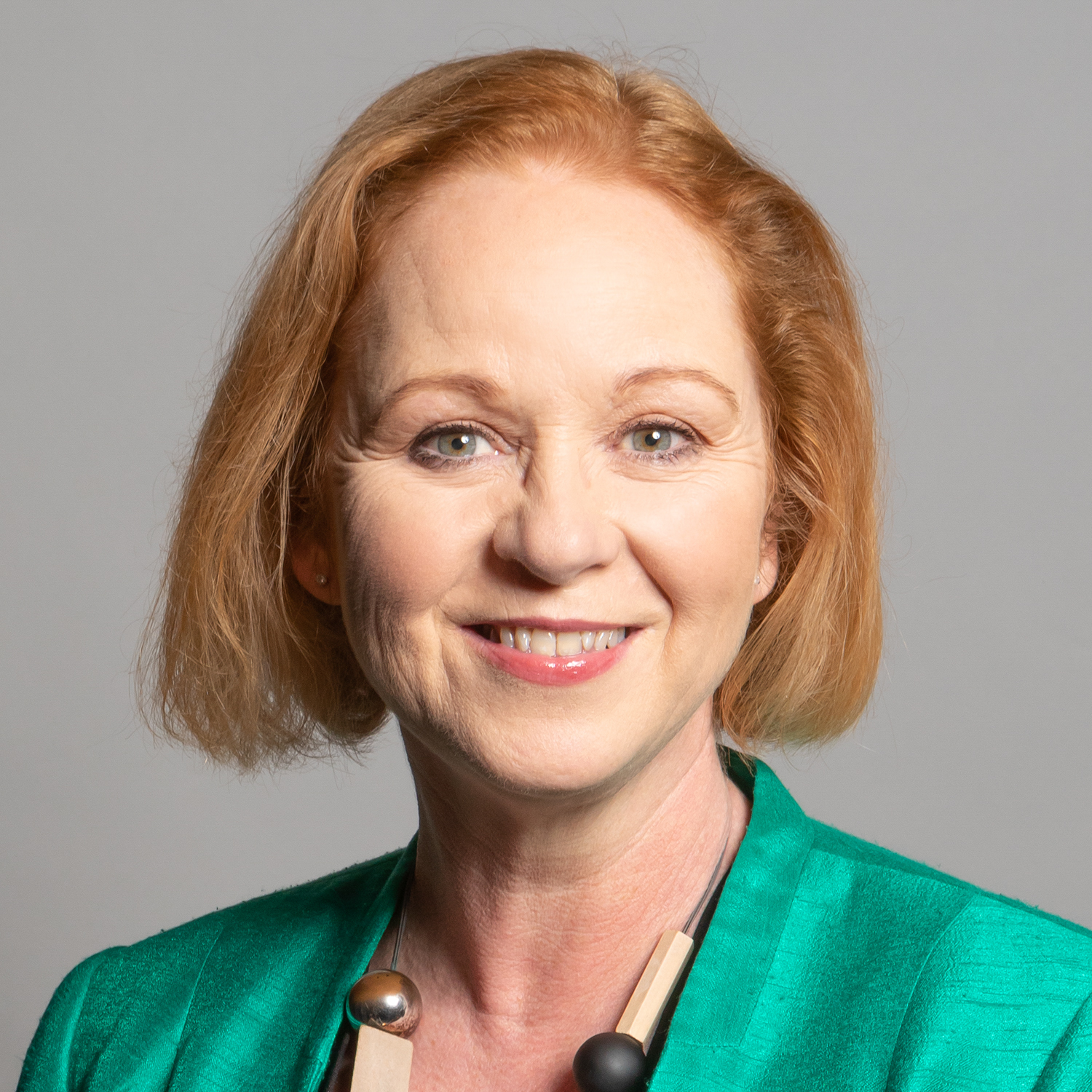
Judith Cummins (née Black) represented Royds ward (2004-2007). Member of Parliament for Bradford South since 2015.

Royds ward is represented on Bradford Council by three Reform UK councillors; Oliver Bolton-Williams, Stephen Place and Tony Wooffitt.

Election	Councillor	Councillor	Councillor
2004	Valerie Slater (Lab)	Judith Black (Lab)	Andrew Thornton (Lab)
2006	Val Slater (Lab)	Judith Black (Lab)	Andrew Thornton (Lab)
2007	Val Slater (Lab)	Gill Thornton (Lab)	Andrew Thornton (Lab)
2008	Val Slater (Lab)	Gill Thornton (Lab)	Andrew Thornton (Lab)
2010	Val Slater (Lab)	Gill Thornton (Lab)	Andrew Thornton (Lab)
2011	Val Slater (Lab)	Gill Thornton (Lab)	Andrew Thornton (Lab)
2012	Val Slater (Lab)	Gill Thornton (Lab)	Andrew Thornton (Lab)
2014	Val Slater (Lab)	Gill Thornton (Lab)	Andrew Thornton (Lab)
2015	Val Slater (Lab)	Angela Tait (Lab)	Andrew Thornton (Lab)
2016	Val Slater (Lab)	Angela Tait (Lab)	Andrew Thornton (Lab)
2018	Ruth Wood (Lab)	Angela Tait (Lab)	Andrew Thornton (Lab)
2026	Oliver Darryl Bolton-Williams (Ref)	Stephen Anthony Place (Ref)	Tony Wooffitt (Ref)

indicates seat up for re-election.

== See also ==
- Listed buildings in Bradford (Royds Ward)
