= Listed buildings in Wyke =

Wyke is a ward in the metropolitan borough of the City of Bradford, West Yorkshire, England. It contains 63 listed buildings that are recorded in the National Heritage List for England. Of these, two are listed at Grade II*, the middle of the three grades, and the others are at Grade II, the lowest grade. The ward contains the village of Wyke and parts of Low Moor and Oakenshaw. It is mainly residential, with some industry, and parts of it are rural. Most of the listed buildings are houses, cottages, and associated structures, farmhouses and farm buildings. The other listed buildings include churches, public houses, buildings associated with a Moravian settlement, a former school, two milestones, a former railway station and warehouse, a chimney and boiler house, and a war memorial.

== Key ==
Grade	Criteria
II*	Particularly important buildings of more than special interest
II	Buildings of national importance and special interest

== Buildings ==
Name and location	Photograph	Date	Notes	Grade
Woodside Farmhouse and Woodside Cottage; 53.74247°N 1.77888°W	—	Medieval	The oldest part is the cottage which has a timber framed core and was encased in gritstone in the 17th century. All the buildings have stone slate roofs. The cottage has two storeys, and contains mullioned windows and a small circular window. Its doorway has a four-centred arch and a massive pediment-shaped lintel. The farmhouse dates from the 17th century and has saddlestones and kneelers. It contains mullioned windows, and the doorway has a chamfered surround. At the rear is an outshut, to the south of it is a later cottage that contains a former upper floor doorway, and this links with a 19th-century sandstone barn.	II*
Holy Trinity Church; 53.75668°N 1.75865°W		1606	The church was virtually rebuilt in 1836–37, reusing some of the earlier material, and the chancel was remodelled in 1883. It is built in gritstone, and has a cruciform plan, consisting of a nave, a south porch, north and south transepts, a chancel, and a west steeple. The steeple has a tower with buttresses and a short spire. The windows are lancets, in each transept is a triple stepped lancet window with a circular window above, and the east window, dating from 1606, contains Perpendicular tracery. Re-set into the wall of the church is a sundial dated 1713.	II
Lower Woodlands Farmhouse; 53.74880°N 1.74074°W	—	1614	The farmhouse is in gritstone with a string course and a stone slate roof. There are two storeys, and an L-shaped plan, consisting of a range of three bays, a projecting gabled wing on the left with saddlestones and kneelers, and a rear outshut. On the front is a doorway with a chamfered surround and a massive triangular lintel, and mullioned windows with some mullions removed. On the side of the wing are external steps leading to an upper floor doorway that has a chamfered, dated and initialled lintel.	II
The Old Manor House; 53.73028°N 1.77044°W		1614	The house was extended in 1687, and again in 1694. It is in gritstone with double gables on the south front, and a stone slate roof with saddlestones, kneelers, and decorated finials. There are two storeys, and an irregular L-shaped plan, and it contains a doorway with a four-centred arch. Most of the windows are mullioned with up to seven lights and hood moulds, there is a two-light stair window, a round-headed window, and a blocked upright oval window.	II*
Park House; 53.75695°N 1.75350°W	—	1635	A yeoman's house in gritstone, with quoins, a stone slate roof, and two storeys. The original doorway, which has been converted into a window, has a dated lintel, and the later doorway has a cornice. The windows are mullioned with four and six lights, those in the ground floor with hood moulds.	II
1–4 Cow Close Lane; 53.73718°N 1.75068°W	—	17th century	Probably originally a farmhouse, later divided, it is in gritstone and sandstone, with a stone slate roof. There are two storeys and the windows are mullioned with up to four lights.	II
45 and 46 Terry Lane and barn 53.75235°N 1.75281°W	—	17th century	A farmhouse that was extended and refaced in the early 19th century, it was originally in gritstone, it was refaced in sandstone, and has a stone slate roof. The windows are mullioned with two or three lights, and the main doorway has squared jambs and a cornice hood. The barn was built on to No. 45 in the early to mid 19th century.	II
Holly Hall Cottage; 53.74797°N 1.76834°W	—	17th century	A timber framed house encased in gritstone, and extended in 1691 and later. It has quoins, and a stone slate roof with a central gable, saddlestone and kneelers. There are two storeys, and wings to the south and recessed to the north. The doorway has a scalloped dated lintel and a hood mould. The windows are mullioned, one with four lights.	II
Upper Park House Cottages; 53.75768°N 1.75290°W	—	Mid 17th century	Originally a yeoman's house, it is in gritstone, with quoins, a stone slate roof, and two storeys. The doorway has chamfered jambs and a four-centred arched lintel. The windows are mullioned with three or five lights, the lights having rounded heads and panelled spandrels. The windows in the ground floor have hood moulds.	II
49, 49A and 51 Town Gate; 53.73943°N 1.76842°W	—	1675	A house to which lean-to extensions have been added on the road side. It is in gritstone with a string course, and a stone slate roof with saddlestones and shaped kneelers. There are two storeys and an attic, three bays, and two lean-to extensions to the west. The doorway has a chamfered surround and an initialled and dated lintel. In the south gable end is a small round-headed window, and the other windows are mullioned, with up to six lights, some with hood moulds.	II
Chapel House Inn; 53.75702°N 1.75918°W		Late 17th century	The public house probably has a timber framed core, and is encased in gritstone. It has quoins, a string course, and a stone slate roof with coped gables and large shaped kneelers. There are two storeys, and three bays. On the front is a gabled porch with a saddlestone and kneelers, and the windows are mullioned with three lights.	II
Cow Close Cottages; 53.73765°N 1.75030°W	—	Late 17th century	A farmhouse later divided, it is in gritstone, with a stone slate roof and two storeys. The doorway has a chamfered surround and a massive pediment-shaped lintel, and the windows are mullioned with four or five lights.	II
Stancey's Garth Farmhouse; 53.72996°N 1.76990°W		Late 17th century	The farmhouse is in gritstone, the front is roughcast, and it has a stone slate roof with kneelers. There are two storeys and three bays. The doorway has chamfered jambs, and a large lintel with a pointed head containing initials. The windows are mullioned with up to five lights.	II
High Fernley House; 53.74346°N 1.77450°W		1698	The house, which has been altered and reduced in size, is in sandstone, with a coped parapet, and a stone slate roof with coped gables. There are two storeys, and a central doorway with moulded jambs and imposts, a semicircular head with a keystone, a small cornice on consoles, and a dated and initialled frieze. Above the doorway is a diamond panel containing a sundial, and a bull's eye window. To the left of the doorway is a mullioned and transomed window, and to the right and in the upper floor are sash windows. All the windows have hood moulds.	II
212 and 214 High Fernley Road and barn 53.74373°N 1.77414°W	—	Late 17th to early 18th century	The older part is the barn, the rest being a farmhouse dating from early to mid 19th century and converted into two cottages. They all have stone slate roofs. The barn is in gritstone, on the south gable end is a saddlestone, kneelers, and a finial. The barn contains two portals, one with a segmental arch, the other with a chamfered surround and massive corbels, and an initialled and dated doorway. The cottages are in sandstone with two storeys, and have doorways with squared jambs and windows with modern glazing.	II
Barn west of Park House; 53.75683°N 1.75380°W	—	17th to 18th century	The barn is in gritstone with a stone slate roof. It contains slit vents, some with rounded heads, and a segmental archway and a round-headed window, both blocked.	II
53–59 Town Gate; 53.73927°N 1.76863°W	—	1727	A yeoman's house that was converted in the 19th century into shops. These are in gritstone and have stone slate roofs with saddlestones and kneelers. At the front are two storeys and shop fronts. At the rear, there is a single storey in the centre, with two-storey wings that have gables with moulded coping and shaped kneelers. The windows have been altered, and the doorway is dated. In the centre of each gable is a small semicircular notched block.	II
5 Sal Royd Road; 53.75284°N 1.75615°W	—	1741	A house that was altered and extended in about 1870–80, it is in gritstone with quoins and a stone slate roof. There are two storeys, three bays, and a single-storey extension to the right. In the centre is a gabled porch that has a doorway with squared jambs and a slightly four-centred arch, over which is an initialled and dated plaque. The windows are sashes.	II
53, 55 and 57 Carr House Gate; 53.74514°N 1.77188°W	—	1750	A farmhouse, later divided, it is in gritstone with a stone slate roof. There are two storeys, and a later projecting gabled extension on the right. On the front is a dated and initialled plaque, and the windows are mullioned with three lights.	II
Low Moor House; 53.75697°N 1.76228°W	—	c. 1750	The house was extended in 1791 and again in the 19h century, and is in sandstone, mainly with stone slate roofs. The original house has three storeys, and small windows in squared surrounds. The 1791 enlargement is taller with two storeys, on a plinth, with a plat band, a moulded cornice and a hipped roof. There are five bays, and a single-storey entrance bay to the left containing a doorway with an architrave. The 19th-century east wing has two storeys and four bays, sill bands, a modillion cornice, and a slate roof.	II
1 and 3 Carr Lane; 53.75078°N 1.76405°W	—	18th century	A pair of cottages at right angles in sandstone with stone slate roofs. No. 1 has one storey and a plain doorway. No. 3 has two storeys, quoins, and a projecting bay on the front. There is a blocked round-headed window, and the other windows are mullioned.	II
43 Terry Road; 53.75210°N 1.75299°W	—	18th century (or earlier)	A gritstone cottage with quoins, a stone slate roof, and two storeys. The doorway has squared jambs, some windows have single lights, some are mullioned with two or three lights, and one has been blocked.	II
Barn, Lower Woodlands Farm; 53.74876°N 1.74044°W	—	18th century (probable)	The barn is in gritstone with a stone slate roof and two storeys. It contains segmental archways, and openings in the upper storey. In the south end is a lower segmental arch with voussoirs.	II
2 and 3 Chapel House Buildings; 53.75703°N 1.75900°W		Mid to late 18th century	A pair of cottages in gritstone with quoins and a stone slate roof. There are two storeys, the doorways have squared jambs, and the windows are mullioned with some mullions removed.	II
4–9 Chapel House Buildings; 53.75704°N 1.75940°W	—	Mid to late 18th century	A row of sandstone cottages with quoins, possibly incorporating earlier material. They have a stone slate roof with coped gables and kneelers, and two storeys. The doors have squared jambs and extended lintels, and the windows are mullioned with three lights.	II
Moravian Chapel and Minister's House; 53.72954°N 1.77385°W		1775	The minister's house was added to the left of the chapel in 1795. The buildings are in sandstone with stone slate roofs, and two storeys. The chapel is rendered at the front, and has corbelled eaves brackets, saddlestones, and prominent shaped kneelers. The windows and doorway have round heads, impost blocks and keystones. On the roof is a louvred bellcote with a pyramidal roof and a ball finial. The house has quoins, three bays, and a one-bay extension to the left. The doorway has squared jambs and a cornice, the windows are sashes on the front and mullioned at the rear.	II
4 Stadium Road, 3 Taylor Road, and 19 and 21 Cleckheaton Road; 53.76335°N 1.76054°W	—	Late 18th century	A farmhouse that was extended and divided in the 19th century, it is in sandstone, and has stone slate roofs with coped gables and prominent kneelers. The doorways have squared jambs, some windows have single lights, some are mullioned, and others have been altered.	II
12 and 13 Wilson Fold; 53.75094°N 1.76525°W	—	Late 18th century	A farmhouse and barn that were converted into two cottages in about 1800. The building is in gritstone with quoins and a stone slate roof. There are two storeys, the doorways have squared jambs, and the windows are mullioned with three lights. In the former barn is a large segmental arch with alternately projecting voussoirs.	II
Chapel Fold; 53.72958°N 1.77347°W		1782	Built as the sisters' house for the Moravian settlement, it is in sandstone with quoins and a stone slate roof. It consists of a pair of buildings with three storeys, and has doorways with squared jambs and three-light mullioned windows. At the rear is an external staircase.	II
Ivy House and South View; 53.72990°N 1.77354°W	—	1782	Built as the school for the Moravian settlement, it is in sandstone, with quoins, and a stone slate roof with prominent shaped kneelers. There are two storeys and an attic, and a symmetrical front of three bays, the middle bay with a pedimented gable containing a Venetian window. Below this is a single-light window, and the other windows are mullioned with three lights. The central doorway has square jambs, and at the rear is a mullioned and transomed stair window.	II
3–6 and 3A St Mark's Terrace; 53.75154°N 1.76861°W		c. 1790	Nos. 3–6 were originally a coach house and stabling, and in about 1851 No. 3A was added as a back to back house and the building was converted for residential use. It is in sandstone with stone slate roofs and two storeys. Some mullions have been retained in the windows.	II
The Poplars; 53.75149°N 1.76839°W	—	c. 1790	A sandstone house with rusticated quoins, and a stone slate roof with a prominent kneeler. There are two storeys, a symmetrical front of three bays, and a later north extension. The central doorway has an architrave and a pediment. The window above it has a moulded architrave, and a round-arched head with a keystone. The other windows on the front have squared surrounds, and at the rear are mullioned windows and a tall stair window.	II
11 and 13 Knowle Lane; 53.73698°N 1.76328°W	—	c. 1800	A pair of sandstone cottages at right angles to the lane, with dentilled eaves and a stone slate roof. There are two storeys, the doorways have squared jambs, and the windows are mullioned with three lights.	II
7 and 9 Sal Royd Road; 53.75301°N 1.75579°W	—	c. 1800	A sandstone house with shaped eaves brackets and a stone slate roof. There are two storeys, two bays, and a recessed roughcast bay on the left. One doorway has squared jambs and the other is blocked, and the windows are sashes.	II
167–173 Wyke Lane; 53.73820°N 1.76282°W	—	c. 1800	Two pairs of cottages, Nos. 171 and 173 dating from about 1820–30, and projecting. They are in sandstone with dentilled eaves and stone slate roofs. There are two storeys, the doorways have squared jambs, and the windows either have a single light, or are mullioned with some mullions removed.	II
Lower Wyke Green; 53.72915°N 1.77434°W	—	c. 1800	A row of eight sandstone cottages with stone slate roofs. Nos. 3–5 are the earliest, with the others added in the middle of the 19th century. There are two storeys, the earlier cottages have mullioned windows, and the later have doorways with pediments and sash windows.	II
Lower Fold; 53.73127°N 1.76851°W	—	Late 18th or early 19th century	The rebuild of a 17th-century farmhouse, it is sandstone with a stone slate roof. There are two storeys, two bays, and a single-storey rear wing in gritstone with quoins. On the front is a modern gabled porch, and the windows have squared surrounds.	II
2 and 3 Breaks Fold; 53.73821°N 1.76293°W	—	c. 1800–20	A pair of cottages at the rear of No. 169 Wyke Lane, they are in sandstone with stone slate roofs. There are two storeys, the doorways have squared jambs, the windows above the doorways have a single light, and the others are mullioned with three lights.	II
4 Breaks Fold; 53.73834°N 1.76286°W	—	c. 1800–20	A sandstone cottage with a stone slate roof and one storey. The doorway has squared jambs, and the windows are mullioned with two lights.	II
1–4 Sal Royd Road and stable 53.75326°N 1.75551°W	—	c. 1800–20	A barn later converted for residential use, it is in sandstone with quoins, bracketed eaves, and a stone slate roof. There are two storeys, and the building contains a portal with a massive lintel and a retaining arch, windows with squared surrounds, and in the upper floor are three lunettes. Attached is a low stable block partly altered in brick.	II
84–90 Town Gate; 53.73853°N 1.76922°W	—	c. 1800–20	Two pairs of sandstone cottages with painted fronts and stone slate roofs. There are two storeys, the doorways have squared jambs, each cottage has a two-light mullioned window in both floors, and No. 90 also has a single-light window over the doorway.	II
2 Worsnop Street; 53.75616°N 1.76384°W	—	c. 1800–20	A sandstone cottage with a stone slate roof. There are two storeys, the doorway has squared jambs, and the windows are mullioned with two or three lights.	II
4, 6 and 8 Worsnop Street; 53.75612°N 1.76399°W	—	c. 1800–20	A row of sandstone cottages with stone slate roofs. There are two storeys, the doorways have squared jambs, some of the windows are mullioned with two lights, and others have been altered.	II
12, 14 and 16 Worsnop Street; 53.75601°N 1.76416°W	—	c. 1800–20	A row of sandstone cottages of varying builds with stone slate roofs. There are two storeys, the doorways have squared jambs, and the windows are mullioned with two lights.	II
95–101 Wyke Lane; 53.73670°N 1.76503°W	—	c. 1800–20	A row of four sandstone cottages with a stone slate roof. There are two storeys, the doorways have squared jambs, and the windows either have a single light, or are mullioned with three lights.	II
103, 105 and 107 Wyke Lane; 53.73684°N 1.76481°W	—	c. 1800–20	A row of three sandstone cottages with a stone slate roof. There are two storeys, the doorways have squared jambs, and the windows either have a single light, or are mullioned with three lights.	II
Binks Fold; 53.73820°N 1.76302°W	—	c. 1800–20	A pair of cottages at the rear of No. 167 Wyke Lane, they are in sandstone with stone slate roofs. There are two storeys, the doorways have squared jambs, the windows above the doorways have a single light, and the others are mullioned with three lights.	II
Barn, Simon Fold; 53.73850°N 1.76959°W	—	1802	The barn is in sandstone with a stone slate roof. It contains a segmental archway with voussoirs, ventilation slits, and an initialled datestone.	II
Old School Mews; 53.75744°N 1.75992°W		1814	A school later converted for residential use, it is in sandstone and has a stone slate roof with coped gables. There is a single storey, and it consists of a main range containing four tall windows with pointed arched heads, and a lower wing at the south with three windows. On the south gable end is an inscribed and dated oval plaque.	II
159 Wyke Lane; 53.73800°N 1.76314°W	—	c. 1820	A pair of cottages, later combined, the building is in sandstone with bracketed eaves and a stone slate roof. There are two storeys, the doorway has squared jambs, and the windows either have a single light, or are mullioned with three lights.	II
The Croft; 53.74743°N 1.74577°W	—	c. 1820	A row of single-storey sandstone cottages with dentilled brackets to the eaves and a stone slate roof. The doorways have squared jambs, and the windows are mullioned with two or three lights.	II
Westfield United Reform Church; 53.73571°N 1.76296°W		1824	The church is in sandstone with a stone slate roof, and a pedimented front of three bays. On the front are two doorways with squared jambs and cornices on console brackets. The windows have squared surrounds, and under the middle upper floor window is a plaque with an inscription and the date in Roman numerals, and above it is a cornice on small consoles.	II
109, 111 and 113 Carr House Gate; 53.74572°N 1.77322°W		Early 19th century	A row of three sandstone cottages with sill bands and a stone slate roof. There are two storeys, the doorways have plain surrounds, and the windows are mullioned with two lights, and some mullions removed.	II
Carr House and barn 53.74614°N 1.77603°W	—	Early 19th century	The farmhouse and barn are in sandstone with stone slate roofs. The farmhouse has stone eaves brackets, and the roof has coped gables. There are two storeys and four bays, the doorway has a plain surround, and the windows are sashes. The barn extends to the rear, in the west front are five lunettes, and there is a re-set lintel datestone.	II
Barn, Stancey's Garth Farm; 53.72985°N 1.77048°W	—	Early 19th century	The barn is in sandstone with a stone slate roof. It contains an arched entrance and ventilation slits.	II
Whitteron House; 53.74888°N 1.76651°W	—	Early 19th century	The house, which was extended in the 1870s, is in sandstone with a modillioned eaves cornice and a stone slate roof. There are two storeys and four bays. The two doorways have plain surrounds, one has been converted into a window with a cornice on consoles, and the windows are sashes. On the right return is a porch with pilasters and an entablature with iron cresting.	II
402 and 404 Huddersfield Road; 53.74694°N 1.77004°W	—	c. 1830	A pair of sandstone cottages in a row with a stone slate roof. There are two storeys, the doorways have squared jambs, and the windows are mullioned with two lights.	II
408–414 Huddersfield Road; 53.74668°N 1.76986°W	—	c. 1830	A row of four cottages and two back to back cottages at the rear. They are in sandstone with stone slate roofs and two storeys. Each cottage has a single-light window above the doorway and two-light mullioned windows. In the centre of the row is a round-headed passage entry with an impost block and a keystone.	II
Nab End; 53.73744°N 1.76346°W	—	c. 1830	A terrace of six sandstone cottages with stone slate roofs. There are two storeys, the doorways have squared jambs, and the windows are mullioned with three lights. In the centre of the terrace is a carriage archway.	II
420–432 Huddersfield Road; 53.74632°N 1.76962°W	—	c. 1836	A row of sandstone cottages, Nos. 430 and 432 were added later, and project. The cottages have stone slate roofs, two storeys, and doorways with squared jambs. Some windows have single lights, and others are mullioned with two lights.	II
Blankney Grange Farmhouse and barn 53.72795°N 1.77445°W	—	c. 1840	The farmhouse and barn are in sandstone with stone slate roofs. The farmhouse has two storeys and three bays. The central doorway has squared jambs and a cornice hood, and the windows are mullioned with two lights. The barn at the rear contains openings with squared surrounds, and blocked segmental archways with voussoirs.	II
1–4 Simon Fold; 53.73856°N 1.76940°W	—	c. 1840–50	A group of sandstone cottages with stone slate roofs, and two storeys. The doorways have plain surrounds, and the windows are sashes.	II
5 Wilson Fold; 53.75089°N 1.76475°W		c. 1840–50	A pair of cottages with a public house front, they are in sandstone with a stone slate roof. There are two storeys, and in the front are six round-headed lights and two doorways, all with pilasters and an entablature. In the upper floor are sash windows, and at the rear are two-light mullioned windows.	II
St Mary's Church; 53.73665°N 1.77166°W		1846–47	A Commissioners' church in Early English style, it is built in stone, and consists of a nave with a clerestory, north and south aisles, a north porch, a chancel, and a southwest steeple. The steeple has a tower with stepped buttresses, clock faces, and an octagonal broach spire with a machicollated base and gablets. The windows are lancets with hood moulds, doubled in the clerestory.	II
Milestone, Bradford Road; 53.72866°N 1.77689°W		Mid 19th century	The milestone is on the southeast side of Bradford Road (A641 road). It is in stone with cast iron overlay, a triangular plan, and a rounded top. On the top is inscribed "BRADFORD & HUDDERSFIELD ROAD" and "WIKE", and on the sides are the distances to Huddersfield, Brighouse, and Bradford.	II
Milestone, Whitehall Road; 53.73045°N 1.78036°W		Mid 19th century	The milestone is on the south side of Whitehall Road (A58 road). It is in stone with cast iron overlay, a triangular plan, and a rounded top. On the top is inscribed "LEEDS & WHITEHALL ROAD" and "HIPPERHOLME" and on the sides are the distances to Leeds and Halifax.	II
Coach House, Whitteron House; 53.74901°N 1.76664°W	—	Mid 19th century	The coach house is the rebuilding of an earlier building, it is in sandstone with quoins, and has a Dutch gable with saddlestones and kneelers, surmounted by a reclining lion in cast iron. Above the coach house door is a round-headed window.	II
St Mark's Church; 53.75152°N 1.76943°W		1855–57	The church originally had a cruciform plan, in 1892 a chapel was added and the chancel was extended, and in 1912 aisles were added. The church is built in sandstone, and consists of a nave, north and south gabled aisles, a south porch, north and south transepts, a chancel, a southeast chapel, and a northeast steeple. The steeple has a tower and a broach spire. In the gables of the transepts are large rose windows, and at the west end is a spherical triangle window in the gable apex.	II
Former goods station and warehouse 53.75152°N 1.74753°W		c. 1860–70	The building is in millstone grit with a slate roof. The front facing the yard has one storey, and is approached by a ramp with a paved cartway, and the front facing the road has two storeys. On the yard front is a full-length canopy with fretted valances, three large loading bays, and part of a platform. On the road front are windows and two loading bays flanked by buttresses. At the southeast is an office extension. In each gable end is an oculus.	II
Wall and gate piers, Whitteron House; 53.74881°N 1.76626°W	—	c. 1870	The wall enclosing the forecourt is in red brick with sandstone coping. It sweeps to a gateway that has sandstone gate piers with gabled finials. The wall contains a pedestrian entrance that has a pointed archway with a rusticated surround, and the end and intermediate piers have rusticated stone quoins and vase finials.	II
Chimney and boiler house, Wyke Middle School; 53.74217°N 1.76813°W		1904	The chimney is in stone on a chamfered plinth, and has an octagonal shaft with broad and narrow sections. At the top is a moulded cornice, and battlements with curved parapets and merlons. At the sides of the base of the chimney are a single-storey lean-to boiler house and a coal store, both in stone with stone slate roofs.	II
Oakenshaw-cum-Woodlands War Memorial; 53.74890°N 1.74703°W		1920	The war memorial is in Victoria Park, and consists of a granite statue of a standing soldier in battledress with a rifle. The statue stands on a granite pedestal with a moulded cornice, which is on a two-tier sandstone plinth, and a base of two concrete steps. On the pedestal are plaques with inscriptions and the names of those lost in the First World War, and on the plinth are an inscription and the names of those lost in the Second World War.	II
98 and 100 Cleckheaton Road; 53.76053°N 1.75964°W	—	Undated	A pair of former estate cottage in sandstone, with a sill band, and a stone slate roof with coped gables. There are two storeys, the doorways are in the centre and have squared jambs. The windows above the doorways each has a single light, and the other windows are mullioned with three lights.	II
