= Transperience =

Former transport museum in Bradford, England

Coordinates: 53.7526°N 1.7463°W

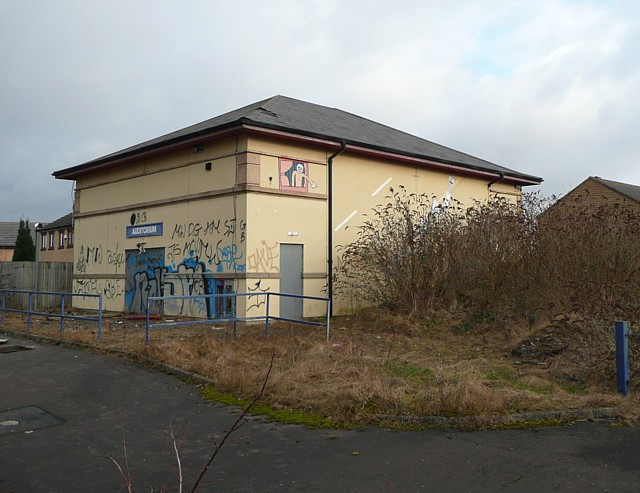
Auditorium of the former Transperience transport museum, February 2010

Transperience was a short-lived museum of passenger transport located at Low Moor, in the south of Bradford in West Yorkshire, Northern England. It opened in July 1995, but closed only two years later in October 1997, with debts of over £1 million.

== Museum ==
The museum was built on the site of Low Moor railway station, (which had closed in 1965), at a cost of £11.5 million. It included a 1,100-yard (1 km) tram line which made use of the trackbed of the Spen Valley Line towards Cleckheaton, and visitors could ride on a Hungarian tram or a trolleybus. There was also a series of vehicle simulators and an auditorium.

The museum failed to attract the numbers of visitors hoped and was closed in 1997.

== The site today ==
The museum site was sold to a property developer in 1998 and is now an industrial estate. Some parts of the museum, such as the auditorium, still stand. A number of the vehicles in its collection have been sold to other collections, such as the Keighley Bus Museum or the Dewsbury Bus Museum.

== Reopened station ==
The land formerly occupied by the museum is the site of the new Low Moor railway station.
