= Listed buildings in Bradford (Royds Ward) =

Royds is a ward in the metropolitan borough of the City of Bradford, West Yorkshire, England. It contains 30 listed buildings that are recorded in the National Heritage List for England. Of these, two are listed at Grade II*, the middle of the three grades, and the others are at Grade II, the lowest grade. The ward is to the south of the centre of Bradford, and includes the area of Buttershaw, and parts of Horton Bank and Low Moor. The oldest and most important building in the ward is Royds Hall, which is listed, together with a number of associated structures. The other listed buildings consist of houses, cottages and associated structures, farmhouses and farm buildings, public houses, buildings remaining from a former textile mill, a memorial and a school.

== Key ==
Grade	Criteria
II*	Particularly important buildings of more than special interest
II	Buildings of national importance and special interest

== Buildings ==
Name and location	Photograph	Date	Notes	Grade
Royds Hall; 53.75026°N 1.78384°W		Mid 16th century (probable)	A manor house, originally timber framed, it was encased in gritstone in the 17th century, and a right cross-wing was added in about 1770. The roof is in stone slate, and has gables with saddlestones, kneelers, and shaped finials. There are two storeys, and the house consists of a central range with two halls, and cross-wings. On the front is a two-storey gabled porch containing a doorway that has a four-centred arch with spiral carving in the spandrels and a massive lintel, above which is a string course, a dated cartouche, and a stepped window with a hood mould. The other windows are mullioned or mullioned and transomed with hood moulds. The right cross-wing has three storeys, it is canted, and in the gable is a lunette.	II*
Stable, coach house and barn, Royds Hall; 53.75061°N 1.78400°W		1663	The outbuildings, which were later extended and altered, form two ranges at right angles. They are in gritstone and sandstone, and have hipped stone slate roofs with bracketed eaves, and there are two storeys. In the north range are four circular windows in the upper floor, and elsewhere the windows are mullioned. One of the doorways has a chamfered, shaped head dated 1663, and there is a re-used doorway dated 1686. On the south range is an external flight of steps leading to a courtroom.	II*
Long Court Room, stable and cowbier range, Royds Hall; 53.75032°N 1.78469°W	—	1669	The range is in gritstone and sandstone and has a stone slate roof with saddlestones at the west end. There is one storey and a loft, and it contains three-light mullioned windows. In the late 18th century a court room was built over the stables at the west end, and this is approached by an external stone staircase.	II
Royds Hall Cottages; 53.75068°N 1.78320°W	—	Late 17th century	A pair of gritstone cottages with a stone slate roof and two storeys, The doorways have square jambs, and the windows are mullioned, with some mullions removed.	II
Moorside Farmhouse and barn 53.75400°N 1.77361°W	—	Early 18th century	The barn dates from the late 18th century, and the farmhouse which has two storeys, was refaced and doubled in size in the 19th century. All the roofs are in stone slate. The original farmhouse is in gritstone with quoins, a datestone, and mullioned windows with some mullions removed. The later part is in sandstone with bracketed eaves, and it contains a doorway with a plain surround, and sash windows. The barn is at right angles, it is in sandstone, and contains arrow slit vents.	II
1, 2 and 3 Abb Scott Lane, Low Moor; 53.75327°N 1.77156°W	—	Mid 18th century	A row of cottages, altered in the early 19th century, they are in gritstone with stone slate roofs. There are two storeys at the front, and one at the rear. The doorways have plain surrounds, and most of the windows are mullioned.	II
Gate piers adjacent to Low Royd; 53.75125°N 1.77181°W	—	18th century	The gate piers of a former drive to Royds Hall, they are in rusticated sandstone. Each pier has a cornice and a ball finial.	II
Garden wall and summer house, Royds Hall; 53.74976°N 1.78404°W	—	Mid 18th century	The garden wall, which runs from the hall to the south, is in red brick with coping. It ends at a red brick summer house that has one bay, stone quoins, a frieze, a cornice, and a parapet. The summer house contains sash windows, and has an arched doorway with fluted pilasters, Gibbs voussoirs, and a keystone.	II
Garden gates and gate piers, Royds Hall; 53.75005°N 1.78348°W	—	Mid to late 18th century	The gate piers are in stone, and in Doric style with pilasters and ball finials. Between them are plain iron gates.	II
Park gates and gate piers, Royds Hall; 53.75041°N 1.78337°W	—	Mid to late 18th century	The gate piers are in stone, and in Doric style with pilasters and ball finials. Between them are plain iron gates.	II
93 Old Road and barn, Horton Bank; 53.77430°N 1.79898°W	—	Late 18th century	A former farmhouse with an attached barn at right angles to the road, it is in sandstone with quoins, and a stone slate roof with saddlestones and shaped kneelers. There are two storeys, and the house contains a doorway with squared jambs. Above the doorway is a single-light window, and the other windows are mullioned, with some mullions removed. In the barn is a doorway with a large flat lintel.	II
Horse Close; 53.74649°N 1.78611°W	—	Late 18th century	A terrace of five estate cottages in the grounds of Royds Hall. They are in sandstone with quoins and stone slate roofs. There are two storeys, and each cottage has one bay. The doorways have squared jambs, and the windows are mullioned with three or two lights.	II
Low Royd; 53.75106°N 1.77161°W	—	c. 1800	The older part is a single-storey former lodge to Royds Hall, to which a two-storey house was added in about 1840–50. They are in sandstone with stone slate roofs, and both parts have mullioned windows. The former lodge has quoins and a hipped roof, and the later part has bracketed eaves and doorways with squared jambs.	II
30–34 Beck Hill, Buttershaw; 53.75877°N 1.79900°W	—	c. 1800–20	A block of cottages, partly back to back, with a double-pile plan and two storeys. They are in sandstone with stone slate roofs. The doorways have squared jambs, most of the windows are mullioned with two lights, and some windows have been altered.	II
69 Beck Hill, Buttershaw; 53.75884°N 1.79966°W	—	c. 1800–20	A sandstone house that has a stone slate roof with kneelers. There are two storeys, the doorway has a plain surround, and the windows are mullioned with two lights.	II
390 Hollingwood Lane; 53.77479°N 1.80435°W		c. 1800–20	A pair of cottages, later combined, the building is in rendered sandstone and has a stone slate roof. The windows are mullioned with two lights.	II
Former Kings Head Public House, coach house and stable 53.76002°N 1.78019°W	—	c. 1800–30	The former public house is in sandstone, with sill bands, a moulded eaves cornice, and a stone slate roof with coped gables. There are two storeys and three bays. In the middle bay is a gabled porch with a blind window above, and the outer bays contain two-storey bow windows. To the right is a former coach house and stable with two storeys at the front and three at the rear, containing mullioned windows.	II
392 Hollingwood Lane; 53.77492°N 1.80430°W		1814	A sandstone cottage with quoins, a stone slate roof, and two storeys. There is one single-light window, the other windows are mullioned with two lights, the doorway has squared jambs, and above the doorway is a dated sundial.	II
8–11 Beehive Street, Buttershaw; 53.75861°N 1.79179°W		c. 1820	A terrace of four sandstone cottages with block brackets to the eaves, and stone slate roofs with saddlestones and large rectangular kneelers. There are two storeys and each cottage has two bays. The doorways have cornices on shaped brackets, No. 11 has retained its mullions, and the other windows have been altered.	II
5 and 6 Abb Scott Lane, Low Moor; 53.75406°N 1.77392°W	—	Early 19th century	No. 5 was originally two cottages, and No. 6 is a low house; they are in sandstone with stone slate roofs. The windows in No. 5 are mullioned, No. 6 has modern windows on the front and a doorcase with corner blocks.	II
6–12 Beck Hill, Buttershaw; 53.75874°N 1.79915°W		Early 19th century	A terrace of four cottages in sandstone with stone slate roofs. They have two storeys, doorways with plain surrounds, single-light windows in the upper floor, and two-light mullioned windows in the ground floor.	II
1035 and 1037 Great Horton Road; 53.77428°N 1.80484°W		Early 19th century	A pair of stone cottages with a sill band and a stone slate roof. They have one storey, the doorways in the centre have squared jambs, and the windows are mullioned with two lights.	II
14–20 Sugden Place; 53.75890°N 1.79914°W	—	Early 19th century	A pair of two-storey cottages and an attached one-storey cottage, they are in stone with stone slate roofs. The doorways are modern replacements, most of the windows are mullioned, with some mullions removed, and some modern windows have been inserted.	II
Crown Inn and Crown Cottage; 53.77460°N 1.80395°W		Early 19th century	The public house and cottage to the right are in sandstone, partly rendered at the front, with a stone slate roof. There are two storeys and four bays. On the front are three canted bay windows, and the upper floor contains four two-light mullioned windows. At the rear are doorways with squared jambs and mullioned windows.	II
67 Beck Hill, Buttershaw; 53.75876°N 1.79951°W	—	c. 1830	A sandstone cottage with sill bands, block brackets to the eaves, and a stone slate roof with saddlestones and kneelers. There are two storeys and one bay. On the front is a gabled porch, and the mullions have been removed from the windows.	II
893 Great Horton Road; 53.77519°N 1.79941°W	—	c. 1840–50	A stone house with a moulded eaves cornice on modillion brackets and a hipped slate roof. There are two storeys, a symmetrical front of three bays, and a recessed single-bay wing on the left. The central doorway has a cornice on console brackets, and in the upper floor of the wing is a window with paired round-headed lights.	II
Gate Lodge and Office, Buttershaw Mill; 53.75953°N 1.79323°W	—	Mid 19th century	The gate lodge and the office are both in sandstone and have bracketed eaves, hipped slate roofs, and one storey. The gate lodge has two bays, and the office is taller and longer, with seven bays. In its centre is a doorway with a segmental arch and a pediment.	II
Main Building, Buttershaw Mill; 53.75941°N 1.79250°W		1852	The mill building is in sandstone with corbel brackets to the eaves, and a slate roof with coped gables. There are four storeys an attics, and 22 bays. At the southwest corner is a stair tower that has a belvedere with a pyramidal roof and an iron weathervane. To the right is the engine house with round-headed windows and a triangular pediment.	II
Main block, Hill Top Primary School; 53.75523°N 1.76936°W		c. 1880	The school incorporates an earlier cottage or part of a house. The school is in sandstone with gables, and contains mullioned and transomed windows. The earlier part is in gritstone with a stone slate roof, and contains mullioned windows, and doorways with four-centred arched heads.	II
Ukrainian Community Memorial; 53.75932°N 1.77918°W		c. 1988	The memorial is in the north corner of North Bierley Municipal Cemetery, and is in sandstone. It consists of an obelisk that tapers in rectangular section to a triangular top, and stands on a two-stepped base. In the upper part is a relief carving of a cross, under which are inscriptions, and an oval-shaped relief carving of the coat of arms of Ukraine surrounded by an olive wreath.	II
