= Low Moor, Bradford =

Coordinates: 53.752640°N 1.766420°W

Low Moor
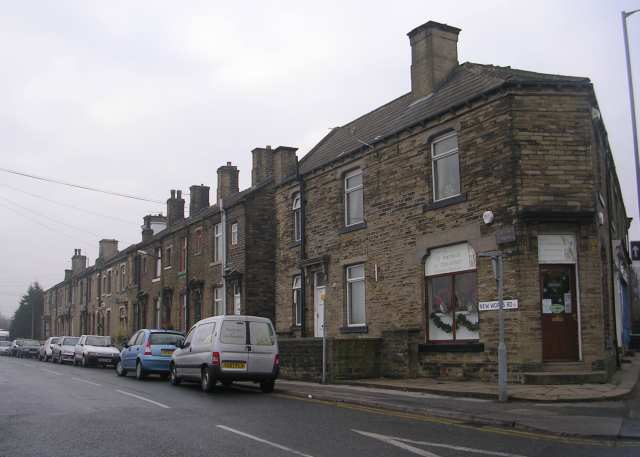
- New Works Road

- Location within West Yorkshire
- OS grid reference: SE155285
- Metropolitan borough: City of Bradford
- Metropolitan county: West Yorkshire
- Region: Yorkshire and the Humber
- Country: England
- Sovereign state: United Kingdom
- Post town: BRADFORD
- Postcode district: BD12
- Dialling code: 01274
- Police: West Yorkshire
- Fire: West Yorkshire
- Ambulance: Yorkshire
- UK Parliament: Bradford South

Low Moor is a village in the metropolitan borough of the City of Bradford in West Yorkshire, England.

== History ==
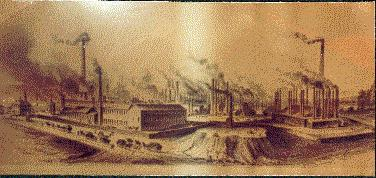
Low Moor Ironworks (1855)

Before 1790 Low Moor was a hamlet where a small number of cottages housed a few handloom weavers who sold their produce in places like the Halifax Piece Hall. The village changed beyond all recognition around 1790 due to the establishment and subsequent rapid growth of the Low Moor Ironworks which was to become a worldwide name. The rapid rise in the number of employees caused a great increase in the local population and the need for housing, churches, shops, pubs and public buildings to meet their needs changed forever Low Moor's image. The image was again changed during the 1960s and 1970s when the whole area was redeveloped.

=== 1916 Low Moor Explosion ===
On 21 August 1916 when the eyes of the world were concentrated on the titanic struggle in The Somme, there occurred at Low Moor, Bradford one of the most awful industrial disasters ever in the United Kingdom. This took place at the premises of the Low Moor Munitions Company, formerly the Low Moor Chemical Company, situated at the bottom of New Works Road, where picric acid, used in the making of high explosives, was being manufactured in large quantities. Efforts were made by the works fire brigade to bring a fire under control, but to no avail. The first of the Bradford firemen to arrive came from Odsal station and were later joined by 18 men from Central. A tremendous explosion occurred which blew them completely off the engine and, in the words of Chief Officer Scott:

within half an hour of turning out to the fire, all 18 men were in the infirmary or killed.

Explosions, large and small occurred at frequent intervals, each scattering blazing debris in all directions, and gradually the whole works were destroyed. At the adjoining North Bierley Works in Cleckheaton Road, a large gasometer containing 270,000 cubic feet (7,600 m^{3}) of gas was ruptured by falling debris. The escaping gas quickly ignited and the heat could be felt almost a mile away. In the nearby railway sidings almost 30 carriages and wagons were destroyed and 100 seriously damaged. Damage to surrounding areas was extensive, with broken windows in all houses and shops for 2 miles (3.2 km) around. Roofs were badly damaged, ceilings brought down and doors were broken, so that for several days, people could not live in their houses and were forced to camp out in neighbouring fields or live with relatives. Some properties were completely demolished by the blast and 29 houses in First Street were erected in 1919 to replace these. One thing which one eyewitness recalls was the number of dogs running away in all directions, later to be found as far away as Wakefield, Huddersfield and Halifax. The official casualty figures given were – 34 people killed and 60 injured. These figures applied only to the works, but outside the works, many more were injured by flying glass and debris.

=== Fire of 1992 ===
On Tuesday 21 July 1992 a series of explosions lead to an intense fire breaking out in a storeroom in a raw materials warehouse at Allied Colloids' site in Low Moor.

== Geography ==
Low Moor very roughly covers the area bordered by Odsal village green to the north, Wilson Road to the south, the Calder Valley Line with Low Moor railway station to the east, and Huddersfield Road (B6379). Other important roads in the area are Cleckheaton Road, Brighouse Road and Huddersfield Road.

== Key landmarks ==
Site of the closed Transperience museum

The most dominant landmark in Low Moor is arguably the most dominant landmark in the entire village, Low Moor Iron Works (Solenis). The ironworks stand in the central part of Low Moor.

Royds Hall, a Grade II* listed building west of Low Moor, was begun in 1640 and substantially extended in 1770. It was the seat of the Rookes family until 1788, when it was acquired by Joseph Dawson, the then chief technologist of the ironworks.

Low Moor was home to the Transperience museum, which was opened in 1995 but closed in 1997.

== See also ==
- Listed buildings in Bradford (Royds Ward)
- Listed buildings in Wyke
