= Royds Hall =

Manor house in Yorkshire, England

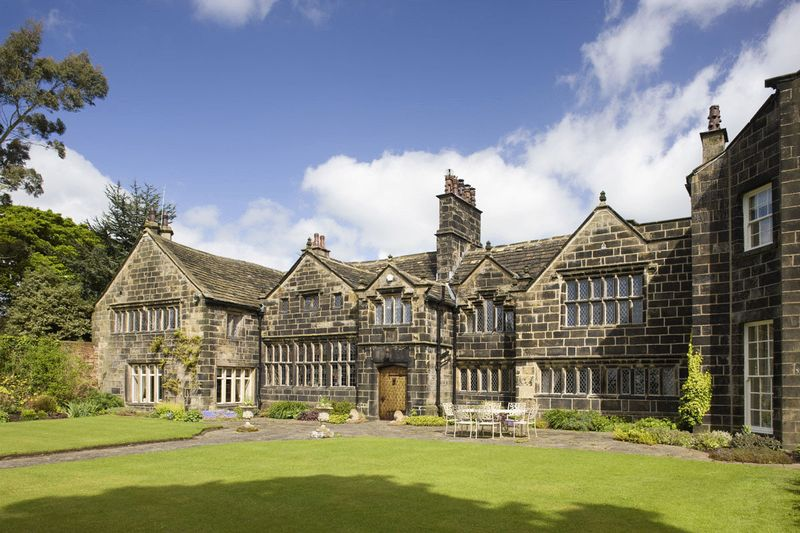
- Interactive map of the Royds Hall area

General information
- Location: Royds Hall Lane, Low Moor, Bradford, England
- Coordinates: 53.7503°N 1.7838°W

Royds Hall

Royds Hall Manor is one of the surviving manor houses in the Yorkshire Region. It is a Grade II* listed building situated on an elevation over 700 feet above sea level in Bradford, West Yorkshire, England and was once the residence of the Lords of the Manor of North Bierley and Wibsey.

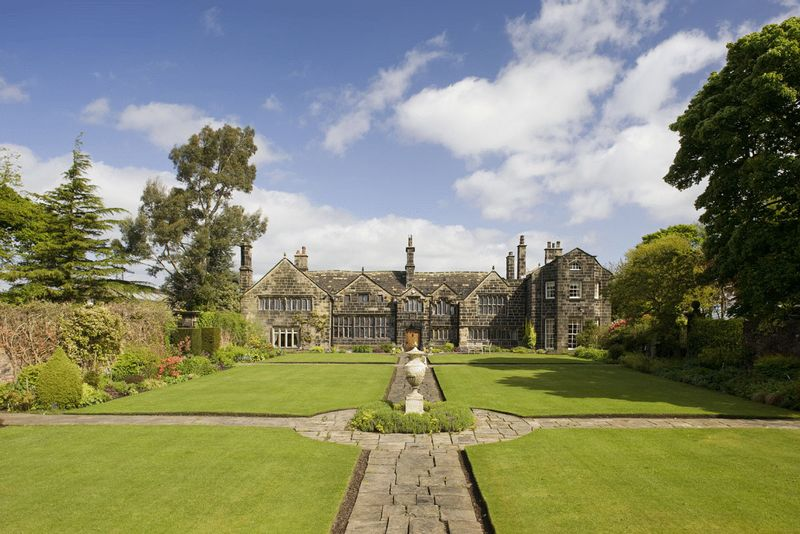
Royds Hall With Southerly Garden

Maps of Yorkshire dated 1600 or earlier show Bolling Hall, now a museum, and Royds Hall as the only two houses in the district. The house is also mentioned in the Domesday Book.

== History ==
Up to the year 1307 the Lord of the Manor of Royds Hall was William De Swillington. He left no heir, and after a short succession of owners the Hall and its estates passed to William Rookes of Rookes Hall, Norwood Green.

In 1313 The Rookes Family became the tenants of the land and owners of the land in 1538 when the land was granted to William Rookes for Knights service during the dissolution of the monasteries. This entailed 40 days annual service to the monarch, then King Henry VIII, and the duties and attendant privileges which were transmitted to the heirs of the House of Rookes.

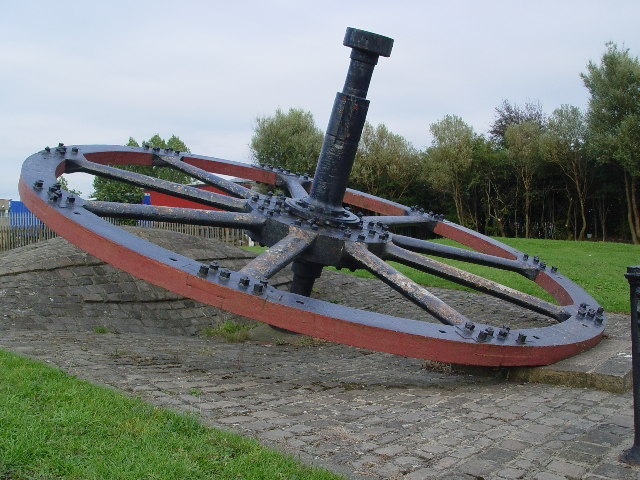
Monument to the Low Moor Iron Works.

After 500 years, Edward was the last of the Rookes line to inhabit the family seat. Edward was a colourful character who changed his name to Rookes Leedes, when he married a wealthy heiress, Mary Leedes. He was a prominent racehorse breeder and constructed a racecourse at the property. He was actively involved in the construction of Turnpike Roads in the area and was mainly instrumental in the cutting of the Leeds Liverpool Canal. Despite the large fortune his bride endowed him he rapidly ran into debt, through gambling, and he ended his days in debtors' prison in 1785.

In 1788, Reverend Joseph Dawson purchased the estate through the Low Moor Iron Company. The Reverend, trained as a scientist, was the chief technologist of the company's success. During his time at the property, he invited his friend Joseph Priestley, who went on to gain scientific notoriety, to stay at the property. Joseph Priestley discovered Oxygen and it is thought that he carried out many of his experiments at Royds Hall.

Successive chairmen of the Low Moor Iron Company occupied the property until the 1920s. Finally in 1932 Royds Hall was purchased by a private owner who stayed until 1975. Two further owners since lovingly maintained and improved Royds Hall, including millionaire businessman Sir Earnest Hall who was responsible for much of the restoration of the property, returning it to its former glory.

In 2014, Royds Hall passed to only its fifth private owners in its long history and continues to be meticulously preserved as an important heritage residence.

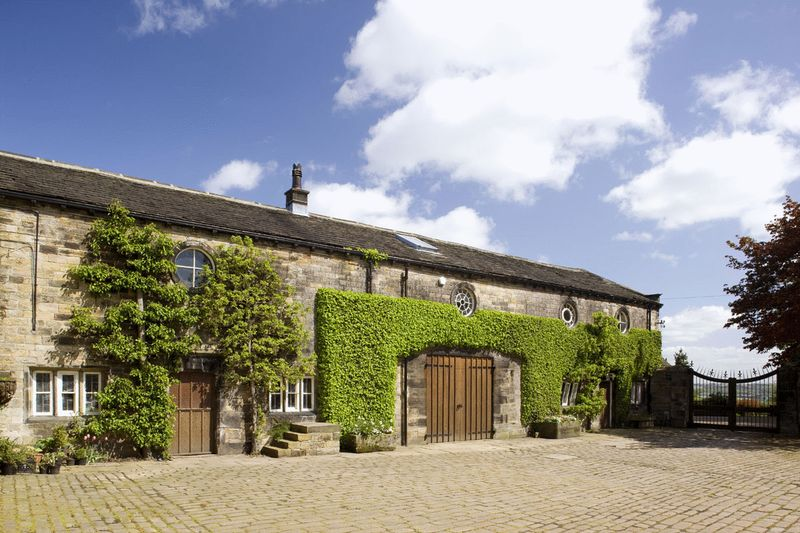
Royds Hall Court

== Courts ==
There is an interesting link to feudal law, two courts were held here, a Court Baron and a Court Leet. These were manorial courts and the right to hold them was granted to the Lord Of Manor by the crown. Details of land encroachment, weights and measures and debts were argued before the Lord, and the procedure undoubtedly speeded by local justice although the decisions may have been prejudiced.

== Buried treasure ==
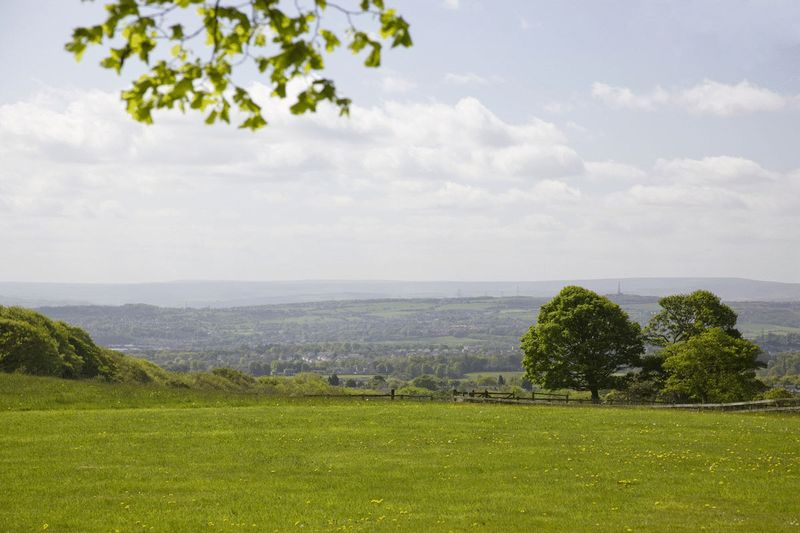
Buried Treasure

In 1641 the Civil War loomed. Naturally, the Rookes supported the cause of the King. The subsequent decline and persecution of the Royalists during the Interregnum also marked a decline in the fortunes of the Rookes family.

In the eighteenth century, when Edward Rookes Leedes held ownership, a man was ploughing on land belonging to Woodside Farm when he came across a large earthenware jar filled with gold coins of the reigns of Mary, Elizabeth, James I and Charles I. This was believed to be wealth that the Rookes had hidden from the roundheads, wealth that William Rookes did not mention when his estates were under sequestration in 1647. There is a record in existence of the rents and personal properties he delivered to the Cromwellian commissioners who attended the Old Dolphin Inn at Clayton Heights, with no mention of any buried treasure. More recently, a man with a metal detector discovered another jar (this time of silver coins) in Judy Woods. This involved him becoming involved in a bitter struggle with Bradford Metropolitan Council, who claimed (unsuccessfully) that the treasure was rightfully theirs, the find being made on council land.

== Architecture ==
A significant property has stood on the site for over 800 years, evolving through the ages from a timber-framed structure into the grand residence seen today. The timber-framed house is dated to 1458. In 1640 William Rookes had the original timber frame encased in a stone façade and extended the property in 1651 to comprise two halls with four gables to the southern elevation. The final evolution of the main property took place in 1770 with the construction of the easterly cross wing. This is built in a typically grand Georgian style and provided the sixth gable which stands above the rest of the property.

== Gardens ==
There are numerous gardens, all meticulously maintained and presented in a history of fashions.

=== Easterly Garden ===
A driveway leads from cast iron gates to the Marble hall's front door around a planted roundabout and on to the paddock land. The large medieval duck pond is surrounded by a woodland walk, which is decorated with statues and a classical folly.

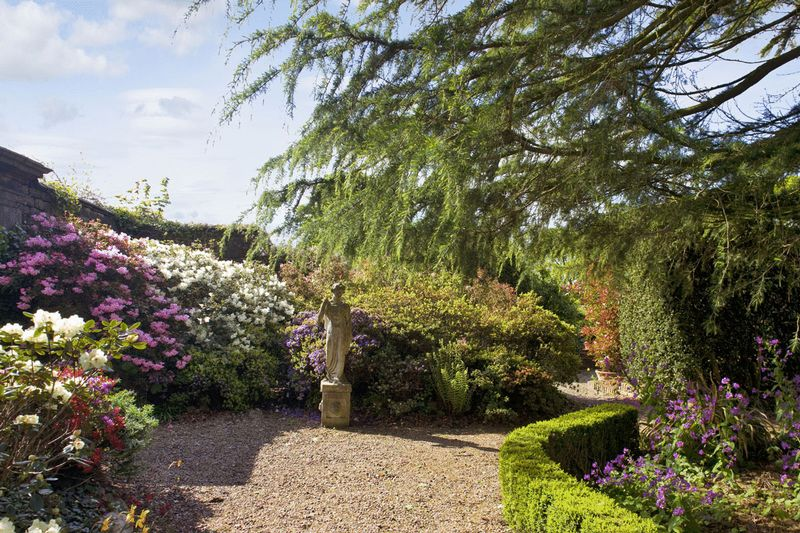
Easterly Garden

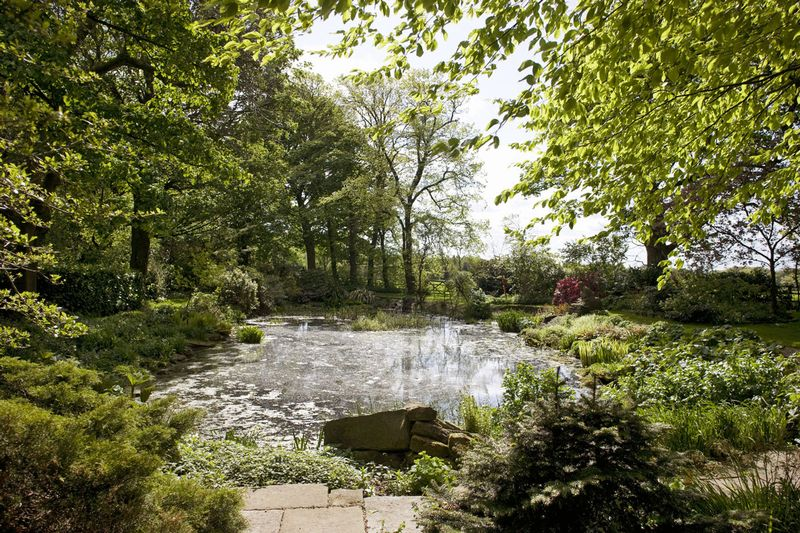
Medieval Duck Pond

=== Southerly Garden ===
A formal walled garden divided into six lawns by stone paths which lead from the front door to a raised platform which forms a ha-ha. A Georgian gazebo has views over the paddock land.

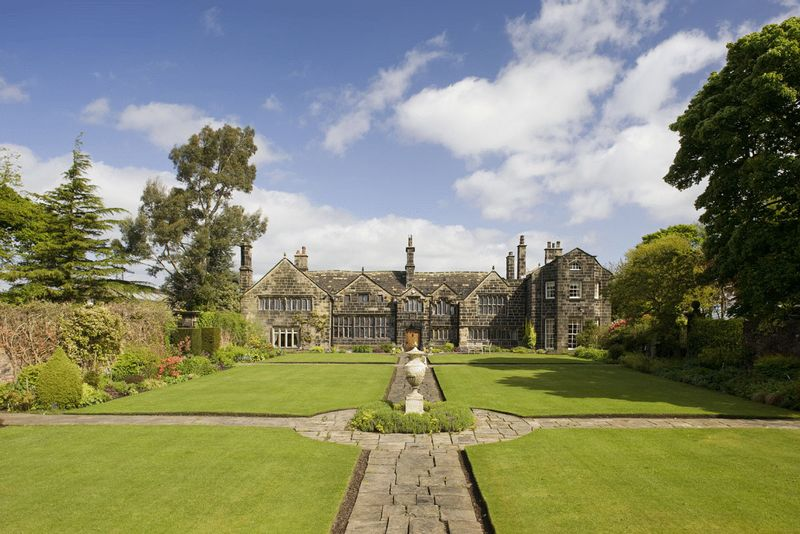
Royds Hall With Southerly Garden

=== Westerly Garden ===
An impressive walled garden with a potting house, Victorian fernery and decorated with classical statues. The terraced gardens are presented in a variety of formal and historical styles which include a knot garden, parterres, a rose walk, wildflower woodland and vegetable gardens. There is a raised stone terrace, fountains and an open gazebo.

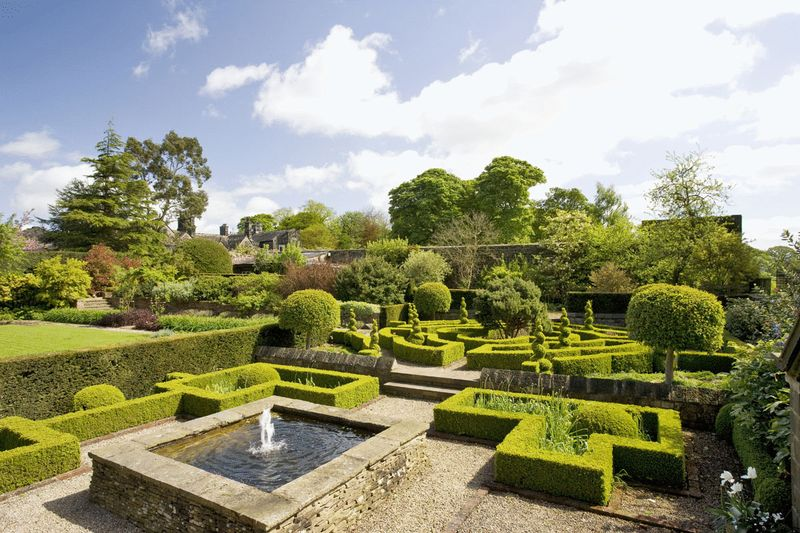
Westerly Garden

== Woodland ==
Royds Hall Great Woods, comprising:

=== Old Hanna Wood ===
This rather remote section of the woods surrounds Royds Hall on one side.

All paths through it eventually come out by the seat at Royds Hall Lane, from which there is a view. A sweep of hills stretching to the boundaries of Derbyshire, Cheshire and Lancashire may be observed. Below, is Norwood Green and its clocktower, beyond which the eye is carried up to the commanding tower of Coley Church, with Halifax Beacon behind, topped by its little white house. Further afield, the ornate top of the Wainhouse Tower may be seen, poking up from the Calder Valley. Other landmarks include Fosters Mill at Queensbury, Reevy Beacon, the Emley Moor Transmitter, and the Jubilee Tower on Castle Hill above Huddersfield. The prospect is truly impressive.

=== Judy Woods ===
Judy Woods is situated to the south boundary of Royds Hall and is the third-largest woodland in the Bradford district at a size of forty hectares.

The present name comes from Judy North or "Gurt Judy" who lived in a cottage near Horse Close Bridge in the 1850s and 60s. She was the second wife of Joseph North whose family had tended the "pleasure gardens" on the hillside by the bridge since the early 1800s. Following Joseph's death in 1850, first Judy herself and then John Barraclough, Judy's son by her first marriage took over as gardener. In the 1861 census Judy is described as "seller of sweet meats" no doubt to the visitors to the gardens. James Parker mentioned Judy in his books, notably Rambles from Hipperholme to Tong, published 1904. In them he included several images of Judy and her son John O'Judy's and related how she sold parking pigs, sticks of spice and ginger beer. He calls the woods Royds Hall Woods and the bridge Horse Close Bridge. It seems that Parker's books, written over thirty years after her death, popularised the woods with a new generation who took to calling the bridge Judy Brig, and soon the woods were grouped together collectively as Judy Woods.

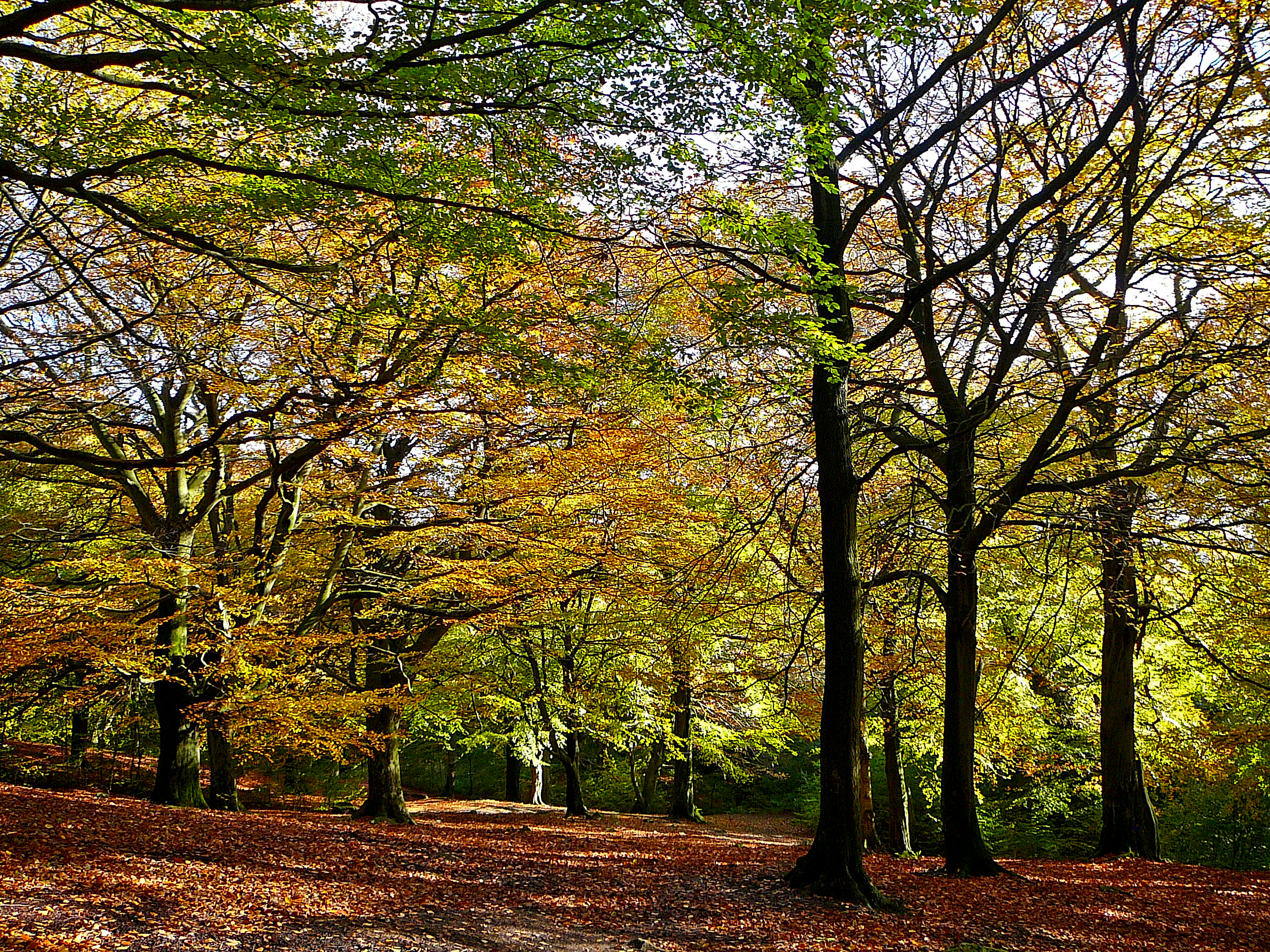
Judy Woods

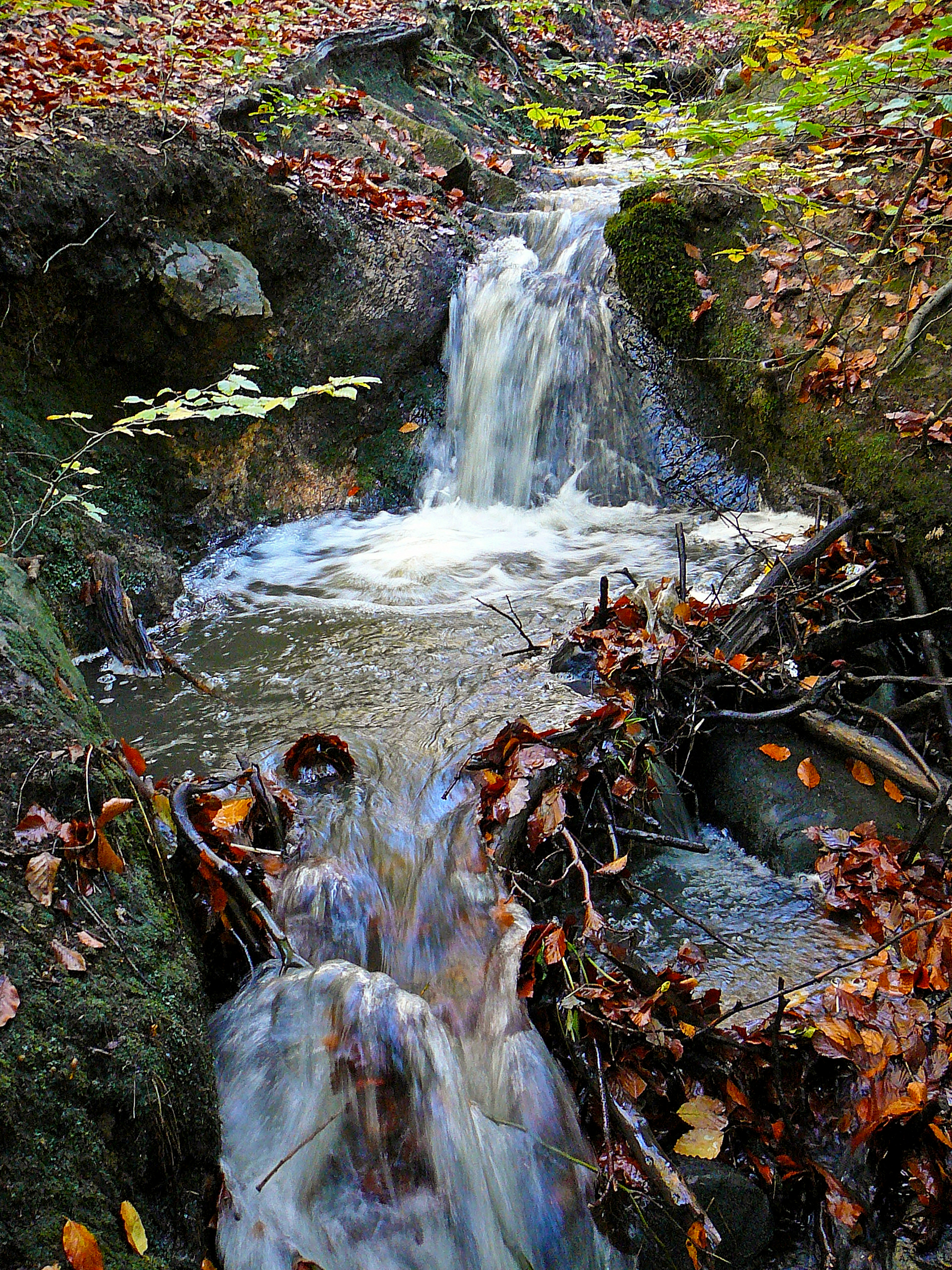
Stream in Judy Woods

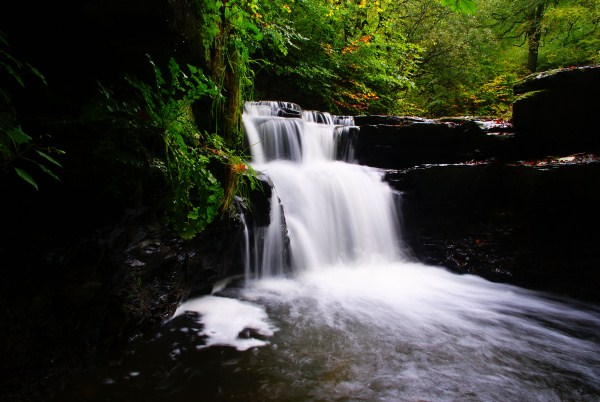
Waterfall in Judy Woods

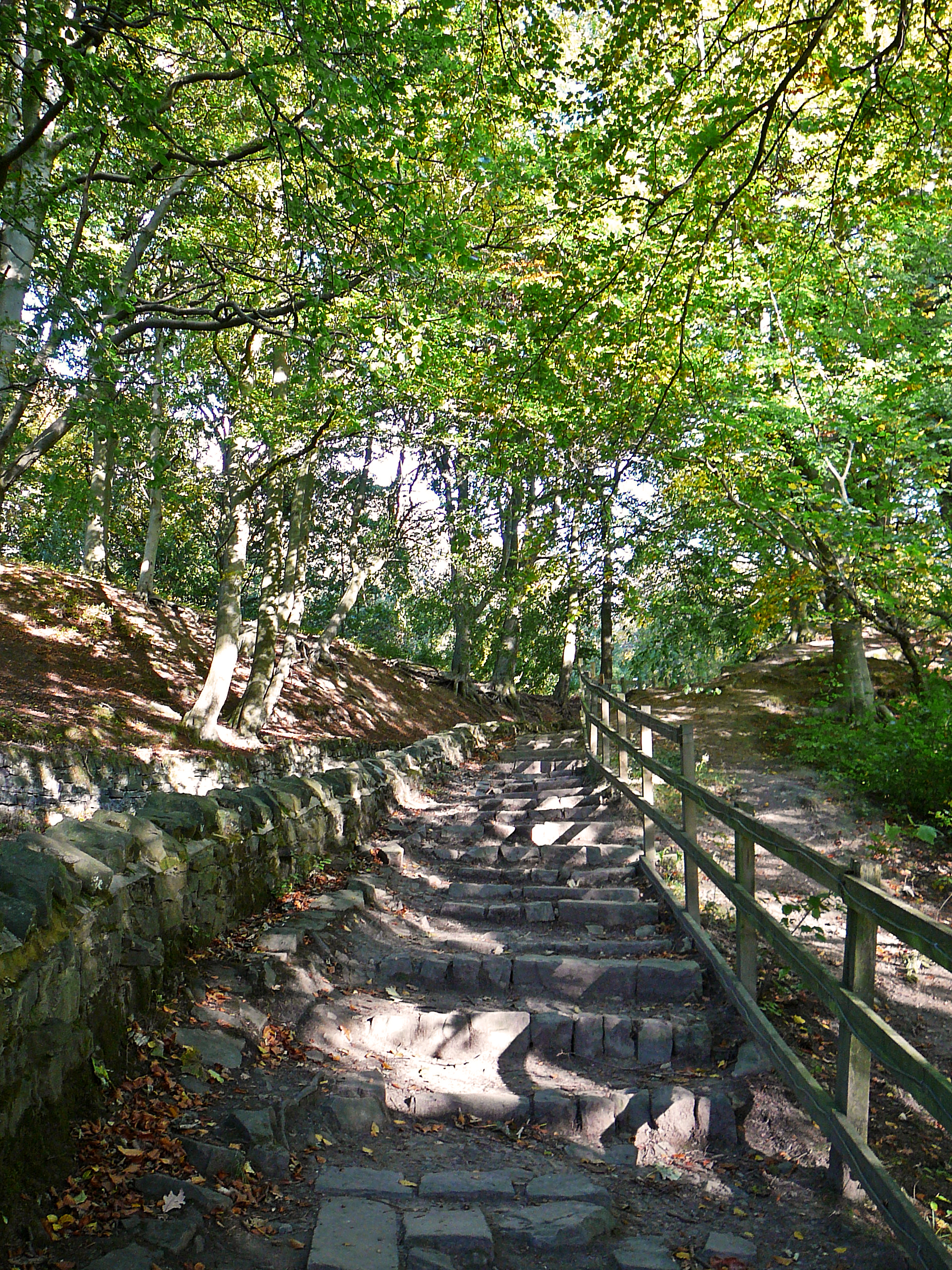
Path in Judy Woods

== See also ==
- Grade II* listed buildings in Bradford
- Listed buildings in Bradford (Royds Ward)
