= Bradford =

City in West Yorkshire, England

- City
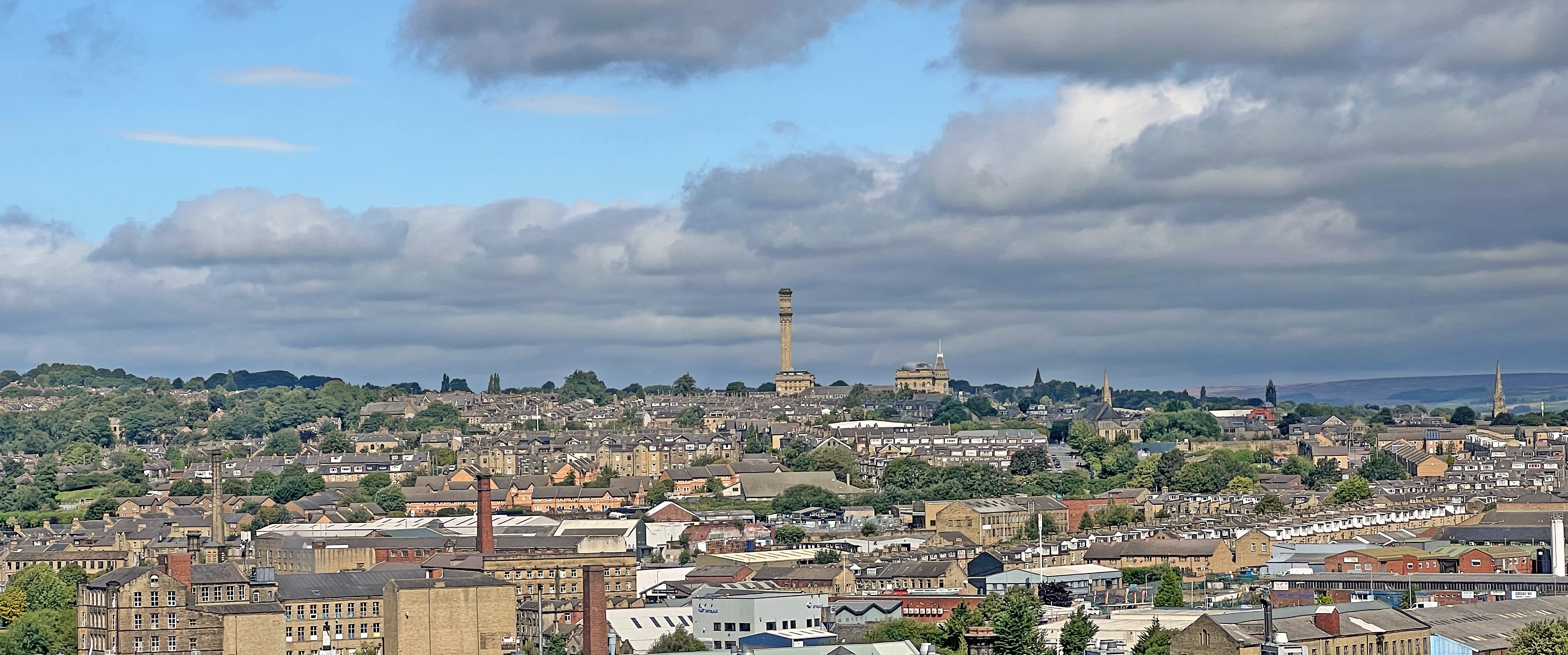
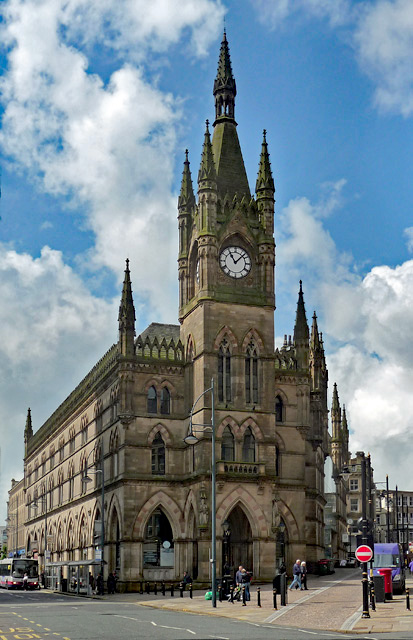
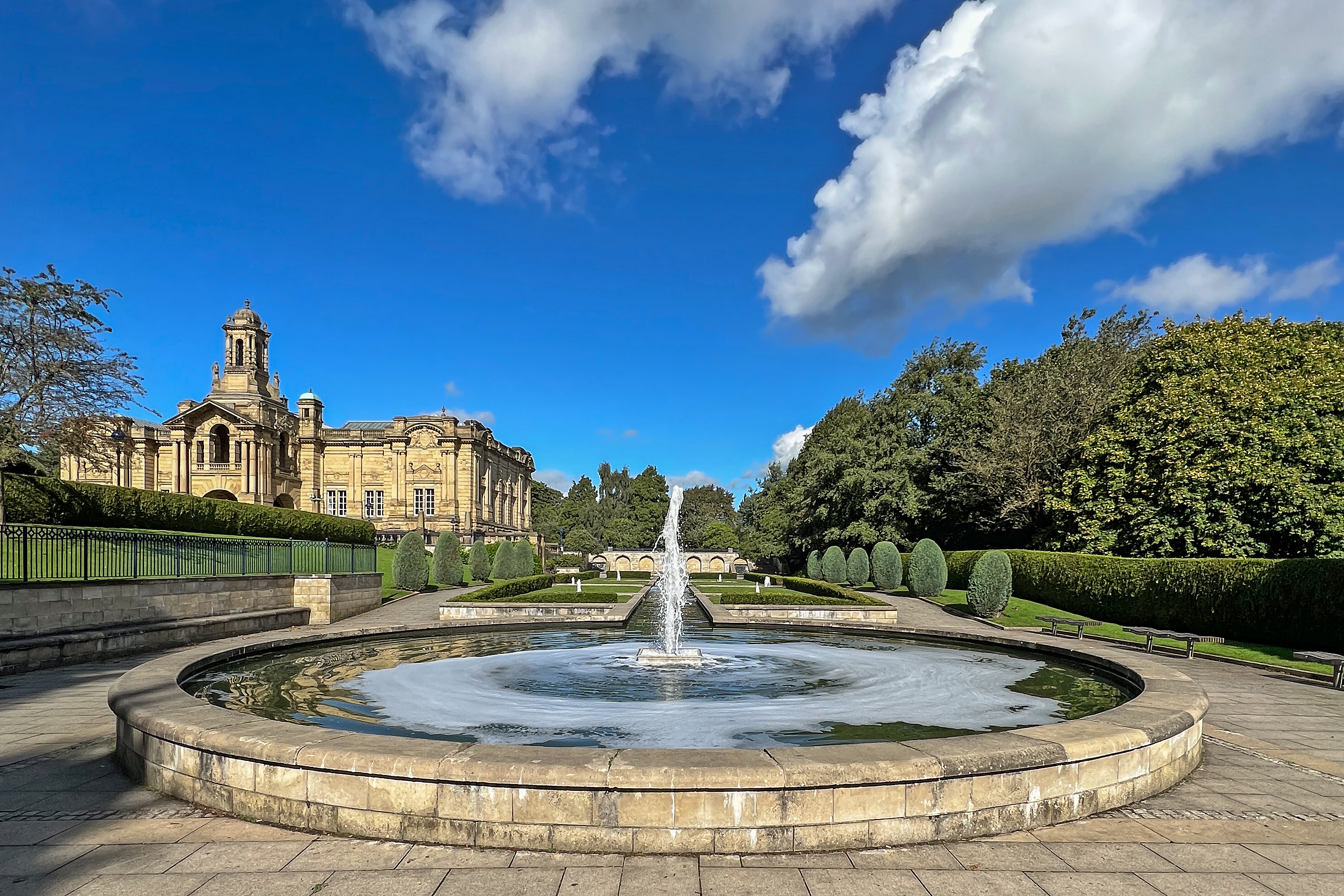
- Skyline of Bradford Wool Exchange City Hall Cathedral Alhambra Theatre St George's Hall Lister Park

- Coat of arms of Bradford

- Location within West Yorkshire
- Area: 141.313 sq mi (366.00 km^{2})
- Population: 546,976
  - Density: 3,871/sq mi (1,495/km^{2})
- Demonym: Bradfordian
- OS grid reference: SE163329
  - London: 174 mi (280 km) S
- Metropolitan borough: Bradford
- Metropolitan county: West Yorkshire
- Region: Yorkshire and the Humber
- Country: England
- Sovereign state: United Kingdom
- Areas of the city (2011 census BUASD): List: Allerton; Apperley Bridge; Barkerend; Belle Vue; Bierley; Bolton Woods; Bradford Moor; Broomfields; Buttershaw; Clayton; Cutler Heights; Dudley Hill; East Bowling; Eccleshill; Forster Square; Frizinghall; Girlington; Great Horton; Greengates; Heaton; Holme Wood; Idle; Laisterdyke; Little Germany; Little Horton; Little London; Longlands; Low Moor; Manningham; Odsal; Queensbury; Ravenscliffe; Ripley Ville; Sandy Lane; Staithgate; Thackley; Thornbury; Thornton; Thorpe Edge; Tong; Trident; Tyersal; Undercliffe; West Bowling; Wibsey; Wrose; Wyke
- Post town: BRADFORD
- Postcode district: BD1–BD15
- Dialling code: 01274/ 01535
- Police: West Yorkshire
- Fire: West Yorkshire
- Ambulance: Yorkshire
- UK Parliament: Bradford East; Bradford West; Bradford South
- Website: bradford.gov.uk

Bradford is a city (Note: The area that is the subject of this article does not have legal city status of itself, but is widely regarded as a city since it is the main and nominate settlement in the City of Bradford local government area.) in West Yorkshire, England. It became a municipal borough in 1847, received a city charter in 1897 and, since the 1974 reform, the city status has belonged to the larger City of Bradford metropolitan borough. In the 2021 census, the city itself had a population of 352,317, making it the second-largest subdivision of the West Yorkshire Built-up Area after Leeds, which is approximately 9 mi (14 km) to the east. The wider metropolitan borough had a population of 546,976 at the same census, making it one of the most populous districts in England.

Historically part of the West Riding of Yorkshire, Bradford grew in the 19th century as an international centre of textile manufacture, particularly wool. It was a boomtown of the Industrial Revolution, and amongst the earliest industrialised settlements, rapidly becoming the "wool capital of the world". This gave rise to the nicknames "Woolopolis" and "Wool City". Lying in the eastern foothills of the Pennines, the area's access to supplies of coal, iron ore and soft water facilitated the growth of a manufacturing base, which, as textile manufacture grew, led to an explosion in population and was a stimulus to civic investment. There is a large amount of listed Victorian architecture in Bradford including the grand Italianate city hall.

From the mid-20th century, deindustrialisation caused Bradford's textile sector and industrial base to decline and, since then, it has faced similar economic and social challenges to the rest of post-industrial Northern England, including poverty, unemployment and social unrest. It is the third-largest economy within the Yorkshire and the Humber region at around £10 billion, which is mostly provided by financial and manufacturing industries. It is also a tourist destination, and the first UNESCO City of Film. Attractions include the National Science and Media Museum, a city park, the Alhambra theatre and Cartwright Hall. Bradford was the UK City of Culture for 2025, having won the designation in May 2022.

== Toponymy ==
The name Bradford derives from the Old English brad and ford the broad ford. This referred to a crossing of the Bradford Beck at Church Bank below the site of Bradford Cathedral, around which a settlement grew in Anglo-Saxon times. It was recorded as "Bradeford" in 1086.

== History ==
=== Early history ===
After an uprising in 1070, during William the Conqueror's Harrying of the North, the manor of Bradford was laid waste, and is described as such in the Domesday Book of 1086. It then became part of the Honour of Pontefract given to Ilbert de Lacy for service to the Conqueror, in whose family the manor remained until 1311. There is evidence of a castle in the time of the Lacys. The manor then passed to the Earl of Lincoln, John of Gaunt, The Crown and, ultimately, private ownership in 1620.

By the Middle Ages, Bradford had become a small town centred on Kirkgate, Westgate and Ivegate. In 1316 there is mention of a fulling mill, a soke mill where all the manor corn was milled and a market. During the Wars of the Roses the inhabitants sided with House of Lancaster. Edward IV granted the right to hold two annual fairs and from this time the town began to prosper. In the reign of Henry VIII Bradford exceeded Leeds as a manufacturing centre. Bradford grew slowly over the next two-hundred years as the woollen trade gained in prominence.

During the Civil War the town was garrisoned for the Parliamentarians and in 1642 was unsuccessfully attacked by Royalist forces from Leeds. Sir Thomas Fairfax took the command of the garrison and marched to meet the Duke of Newcastle but was defeated. The Parliamentarians retreated to Bradford and the Royalists set up headquarters at Bolling Hall from where the town was besieged leading to its surrender. The Civil War caused a decline in industry but after the accession of William III and Mary II in 1689 prosperity began to return. The launch of manufacturing in the early 18th century marked the start of the town's development while new canal and turnpike road links encouraged trade.

=== Industrial Revolution ===
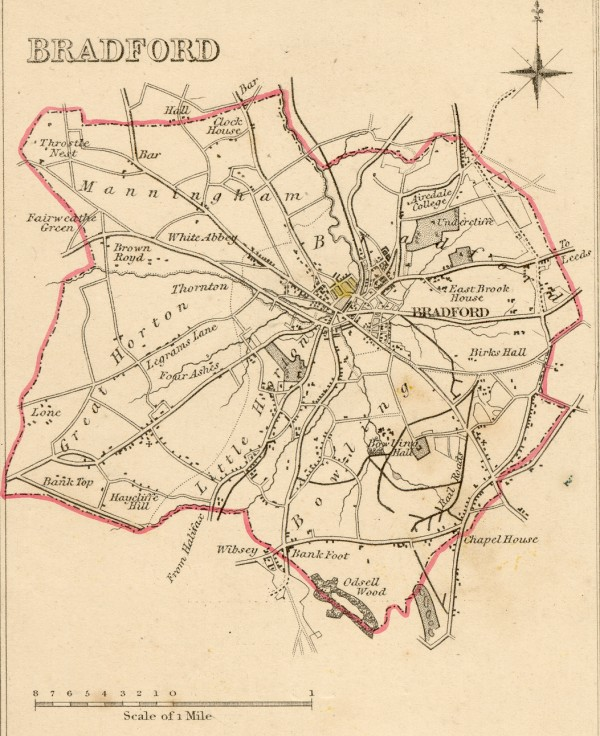
Bradford's boundaries in 1835.

In 1801, Bradford was a rural market town of 6,393 people, where wool spinning and cloth weaving were carried out in local cottages and farms. Bradford was thus not much bigger than nearby Keighley (5,745) and was significantly smaller than Halifax (8,866) and Huddersfield (7,268). This small town acted as a hub for three nearby townships – Manningham, Bowling and Great and Little Horton, which were separated from the town by countryside.

Blast furnaces were established in about 1788 by Hird, Dawson Hardy at Low Moor and iron was worked by the Bowling Iron Company until about 1900. Yorkshire iron was used for shackles, hooks and piston rods for locomotives, colliery cages and other mining appliances where toughness was required. The Low Moor Company also made pig iron and the company employed 1,500 men in 1929. When the municipal borough of Bradford was created in 1847 there were 46 coal mines within its boundaries. Coal output continued to expand, reaching a peak in 1868 when Bradford contributed a quarter of all the coal and iron produced in Yorkshire.

The population of the township in 1841 was 34,560.

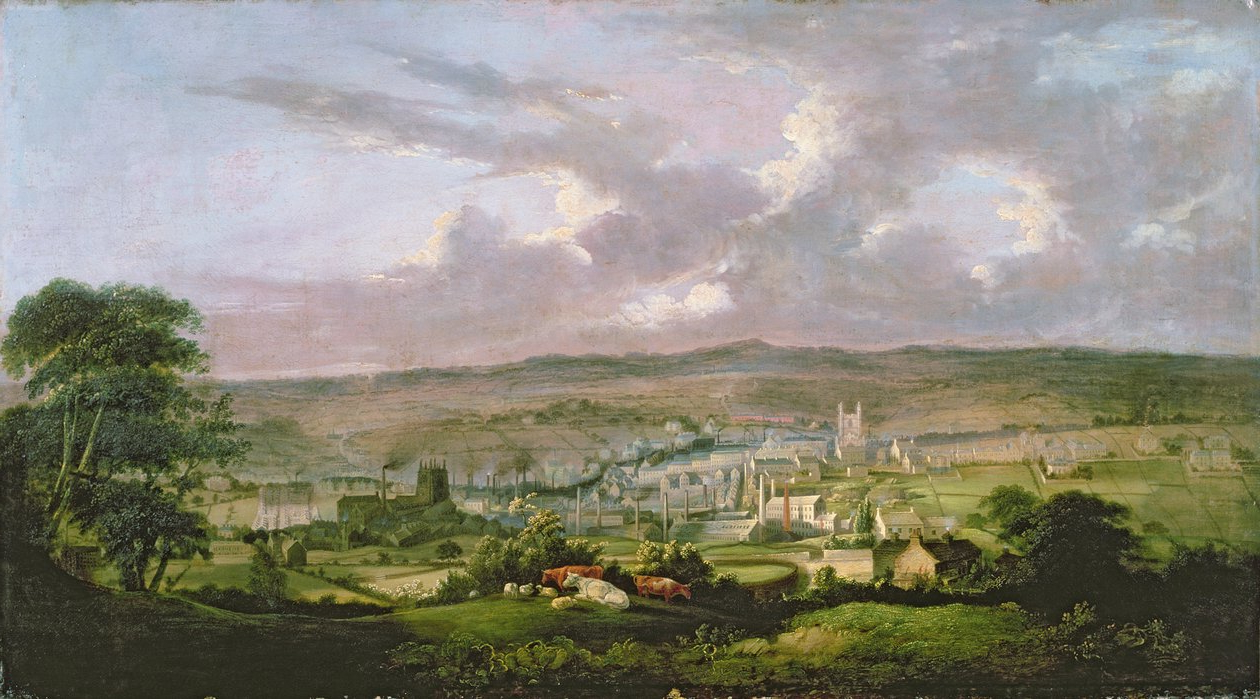
Bradford, c. 1825, by John Wilson Anderson

In 1825 the wool-combers union called a strike that lasted five-months but workers were forced to return to work through hardship leading to the introduction of machine-combing. This Industrial Revolution led to rapid growth, with wool imported in vast quantities for the manufacture of worsted cloth in which Bradford specialised, and the town soon became known as the wool capital of the world.

A permanent military presence was established in the town with the completion of Bradford Moor Barracks in 1844.

Bradford became a municipal borough in 1847, and a county borough in 1888, making it administratively independent of the West Riding County Council. It was honoured with city status on the occasion of Queen Victoria's Diamond Jubilee in 1897, with Kingston upon Hull and Nottingham. The three had been the largest county boroughs outside the London area without city status. The borough's boundaries were extended to absorb Clayton in 1930, and parts of Rawdon, Shipley, Wharfedale and Yeadon urban districts in 1937.

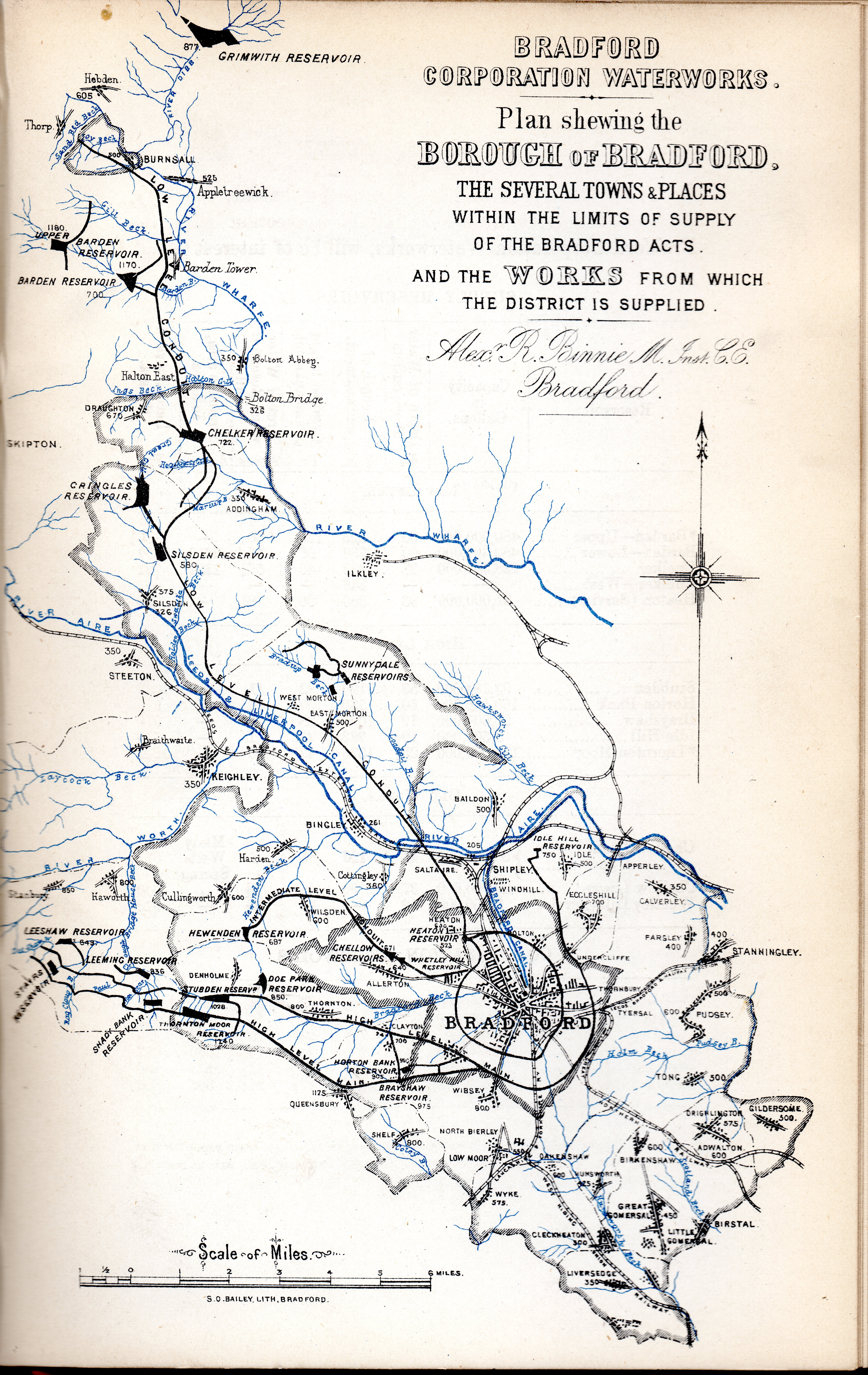
Bradford's waterworks upon completion of the Wharfedale scheme in 1881

Bradford had ample supplies of locally mined coal to provide the power that the industry needed. Local sandstone was an excellent resource for building the mills, and with a population of 182,000 by 1850, the town grew rapidly as workers were attracted by jobs in the textile mills. A desperate shortage of water in Bradford Dale was a serious limitation on industrial expansion and improvement in urban sanitary conditions. In 1854 Bradford Corporation bought the Bradford Water Company and embarked on a huge engineering programme to bring supplies of soft water from Airedale, Wharfedale and Nidderdale. By 1882 water supply had radically improved. Meanwhile, urban expansion took place along the routes out of the city towards the Hortons and Bowling and the townships had become part of a continuous urban area by the late 19th century.

A major employer was Titus Salt who in 1833 took over the running of his father's woollen business specialising in fabrics combining alpaca, mohair, cotton, and silk. By 1850, he had five mills. Because of the polluted environment and squalid conditions for his workers, Salt left Bradford and transferred his business to Salts Mill in Saltaire in 1850. There, in 1853, he began to build the workers' village, which has become a UNESCO World Heritage Site.

Henry Ripley was a younger contemporary of Titus Salt. He was managing partner of Edward Ripley & Son Ltd, which owned the Bowling Dye Works. In 1880 the dye works employed over 1000 people and was said to be the biggest dye works in Europe. Like Salt he was a councillor, JP and Bradford MP who was deeply concerned to improve working class housing conditions. He built the industrial Model village of Ripley Ville on a site in Broomfields, East Bowling close to the dye works.

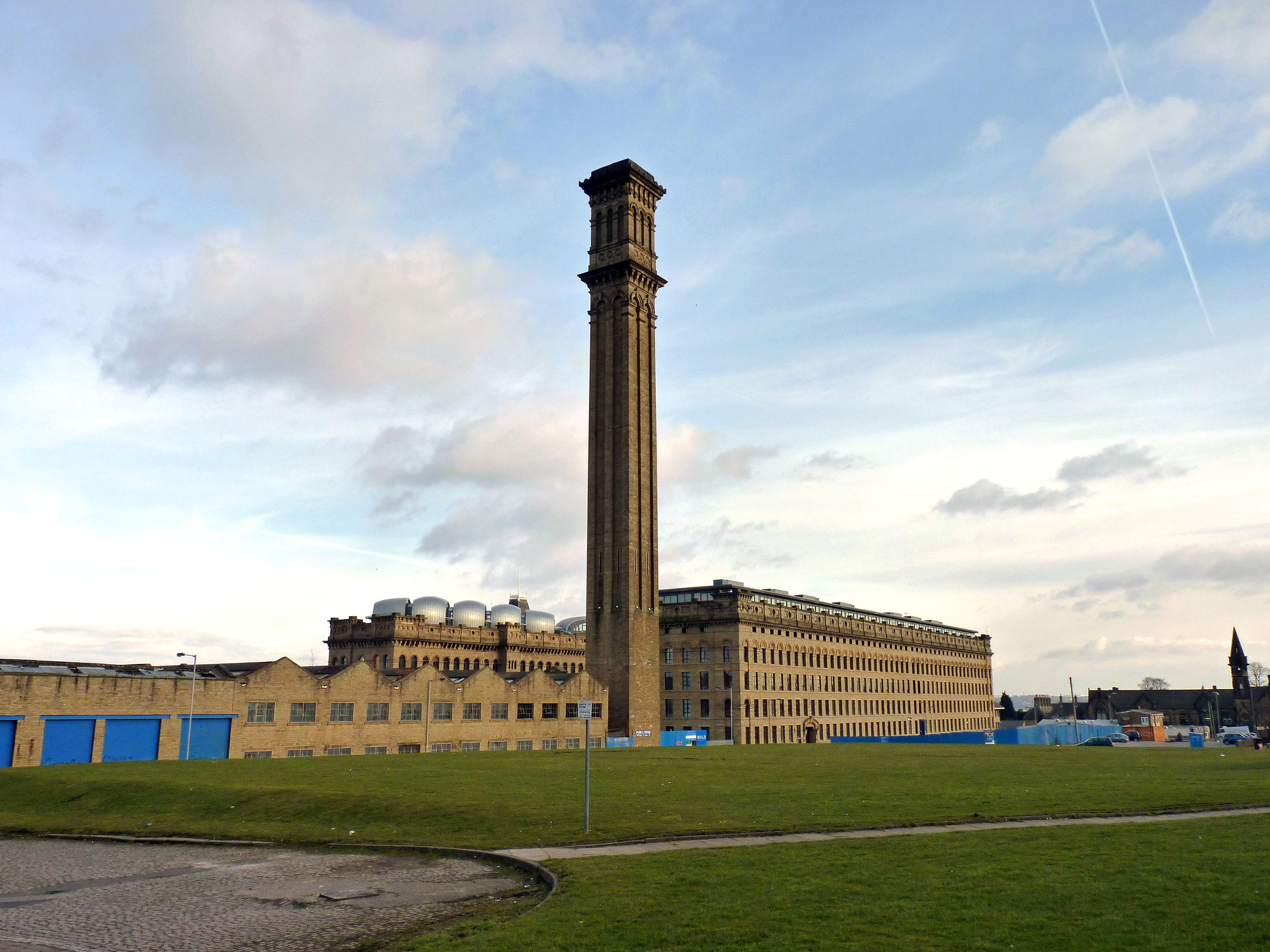
Lister's Mill was the largest silk factory in the world

Other major employers were Samuel Lister and his brother who were worsted spinners and manufacturers at Lister's Mill (Manningham Mills). Lister epitomised Victorian enterprise but it has been suggested that his capitalist attitude made trade unions necessary. Unprecedented growth created problems with over 200 factory chimneys continually churning out black, sulphurous smoke. Bradford gained the reputation of being the most polluted town in England. There were frequent outbreaks of cholera and typhoid, and only 30% of children born to textile workers reached the age of fifteen. This extreme level of infant and youth mortality contributed to a life expectancy for Bradford residents of just over eighteen years, which was one of the lowest in the country.

Like many major cities, Bradford has been a destination for immigrants. In the 1840s Bradford's population was significantly increased by migrants from Ireland, particularly rural County Mayo and County Sligo, and by 1851 about 10% of the population were born in Ireland, the largest proportion in Yorkshire. Around the middle decades of the 19th century the Irish were concentrated in eight densely settled areas situated near the town centre. One of these was the Bedford Street area of Broomfields, which in 1861 contained 1,162 persons of Irish birth—19% of all Irish born persons in the Borough.

A portal in the Little Germany area of Bradford

During the 1820s and 1830s, there was immigration from Germany. Many were Jewish merchants and they became active in the life of the town. The Jewish community mostly living in the Manningham area of the town, numbered about 100 families but was influential in the development of Bradford as a major exporter of woollen goods from their textile export houses predominantly based in Little Germany and the civic life of Bradford. Charles Semon (1814–1877) was a textile merchant and philanthropist who developed a productive textile export house in the town, he became the first foreign and Jewish mayor of Bradford in 1864.

Jacob Behrens (1806–1889) was the first foreign textile merchant to export woollen goods from the town, his company developed into an international multimillion-pound business. Behrens was a philanthropist, he also helped to establish the Bradford chamber of commerce in 1851. Jacob Moser (1839–1922) was a textile merchant who was a partner in the firm Edelstein, Moser and Co, which developed into a successful Bradford textile export house. Moser was a philanthropist, he founded the Bradford Charity Organisation Society and the City Guild of Help. In 1910 Moser became the first Jewish Lord Mayor of Bradford.

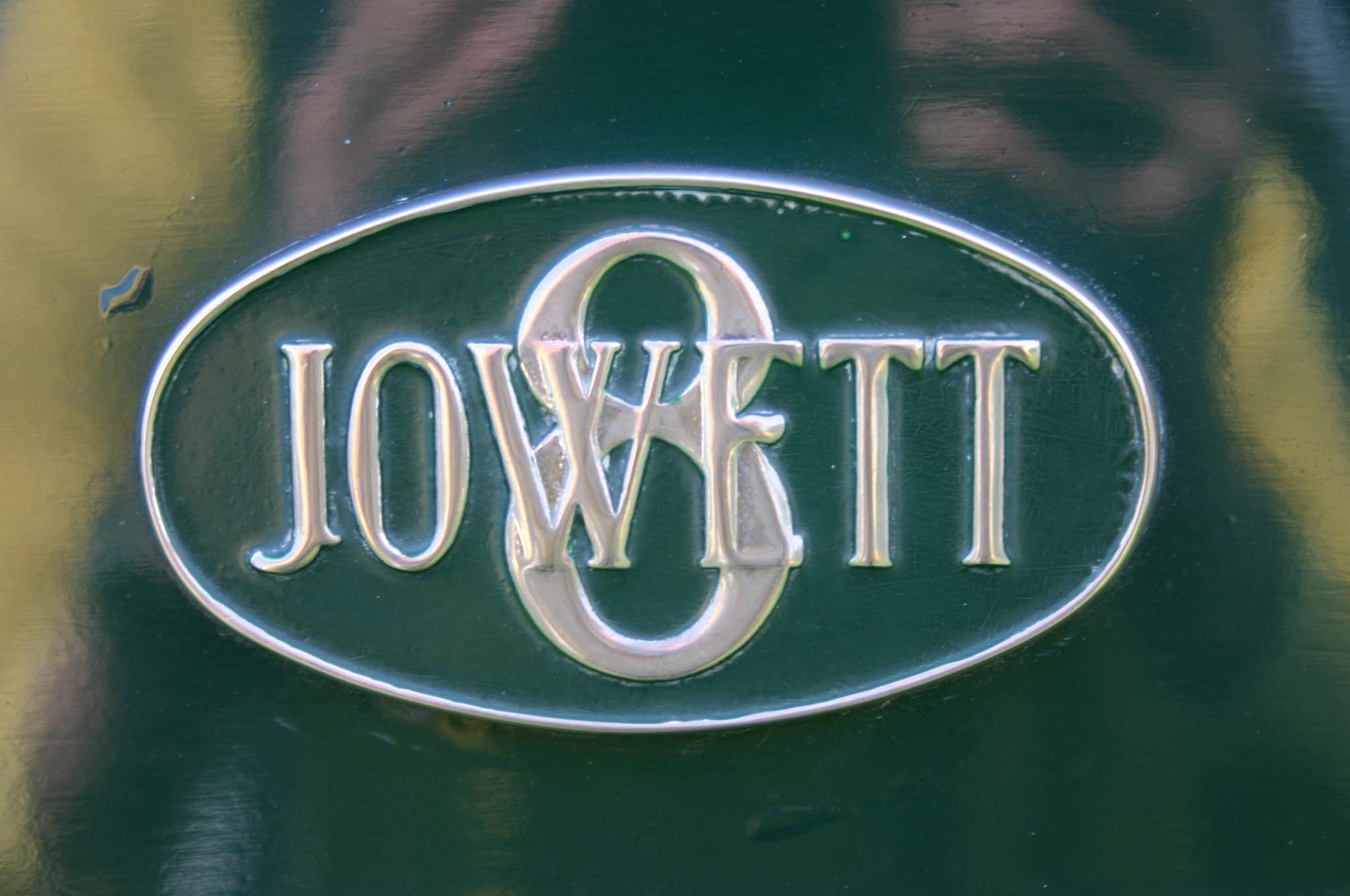
Jowett Cars Eight badge

To support the textile mills, a large manufacturing base grew up in the town providing textile machinery, and this led to diversification with different industries thriving side by side. The Jowett Motor Company founded in the early 20th century by Benjamin and William Jowett and Arthur V Lamb, manufactured cars and vans in Bradford for 50 years. The Scott Motorcycle Company was a well known producer of motorcycles and light engines for industry. Founded by Alfred Angas Scott in 1908 as the Scott Engineering Company in Bradford, Scott motorcycles were produced until 1978.

=== Independent Labour Party ===
The city played an important part in the early history of the Labour Party. A mural on the back of the Bradford Playhouse in Little Germany commemorates the centenary of the founding of the Independent Labour Party in Bradford in 1893.

=== First World War ===
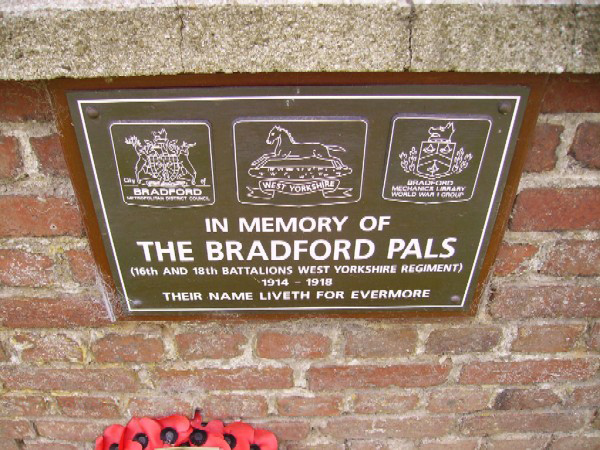
A memorial to the men of the 16th Battalion and the 18th Battalion of the regiment who died in the First World War

The Bradford Pals were three First World War Pals battalions of Kitchener's Army raised in the city. When the three battalions were taken over by the British Army they were officially named the 16th (1st Bradford), 18th (2nd Bradford), and 20th (Reserve) Battalions, The Prince of Wales's Own (West Yorkshire Regiment).

On the morning of 1 July 1916, the 16th and 18th Battalions left their trenches in Northern France to advance across no man's land. It was the first hour of the first day of the Battle of the Somme. Of the estimated 1,394 men from Bradford and District in the two battalions, 1,060 were either killed or injured during the ill-fated attack on the village of Serre-lès-Puisieux.

Other Bradford battalions of The Prince of Wales's Own (West Yorkshire Regiment) involved in the Battle of the Somme were the 1st/6th Battalion (the former Bradford Rifle Volunteers), part of the Territorial Force, based at Belle Vue Barracks in Manningham. The 1/6th Battalion first saw action in 1915 at the Battle of Aubers Ridge before moving north to the Yser Canal near Ypres. On the first day of the Somme they took heavy casualties while trying to support the 36th (Ulster) Division. The 2nd/6th Battalion (the former Bradford Rifle Volunteers) was also moved to France in 1917.

The 1/2nd and 2/2nd West Riding Brigades, Royal Field Artillery (TF), had their headquarters at Valley Parade in Manningham, with batteries at Bradford, Halifax and Heckmondwike. The 1/2nd Brigade crossed to France with the 1/6th Battalion West Yorks in April 1915. These Territorial Force units were to remain close to each other throughout the war, serving in the 49th (West Riding) Division. They were joined in 1917 by the 2/6th Battalion, West Yorks, and 2/2nd West Riding Brigade, RFA, serving in the 62nd (2nd West Riding) Division. Bradford also raised squadrons of the Yorkshire Hussars and Yorkshire Dragoons whose headquarters were at York and Doncaster. There was also the regular Army Service Corps which had their headquarters at Bradford Moor Barracks.

=== Recent history ===
Bradford's Telegraph and Argus newspaper was involved in spearheading the news of the 1936 Abdication Crisis, after the Bishop of Bradford publicly expressed doubts about Edward VIII's religious beliefs (see: Telegraph & Argus#1936 Abdication Crisis).

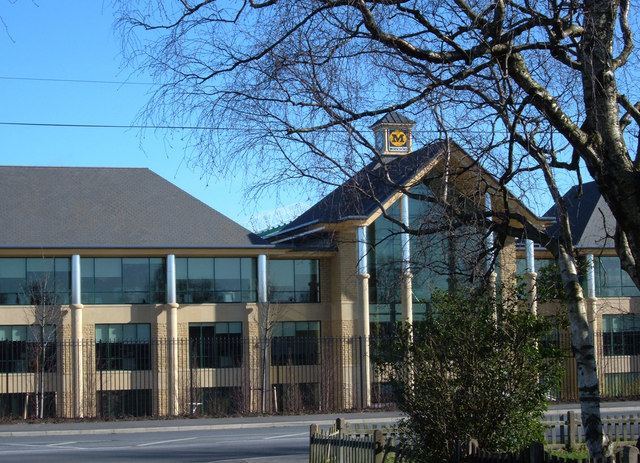
Morrisons' headquarters in Bradford

After the Second World War migrants came from Poland and Ukraine and since the 1950s from Bangladesh, India and particularly Pakistan.

The textile industry has been in decline throughout the latter part of the 20th century. A culture of innovation had been fundamental to Bradford's dominance, with new textile technologies being invented in the city, a prime example being the work of Samuel Lister. This innovation culture continues today throughout Bradford's economy, from automotive (Kahn Design) to electronics (Pace Micro Technology). Wm Morrison Supermarkets was founded by William Morrison in 1899, initially as an egg and butter merchant in Rawson Market, operating under the name of Wm Morrison (Provisions) Limited.

The grandest of the mills no longer used for textile production is Lister Mills, the chimney of which can be seen from most places in Bradford. It has become a beacon of regeneration after a £100 million conversion to apartment blocks by property developer Urban Splash.

In 1989, copies of Salman Rushdie's The Satanic Verses were burnt in the city, and a section of the Muslim community led a campaign against the book. In July 2001, ethnic tensions led to rioting, and a report described Bradford as fragmented and a city of segregated ethnic communities.

The Yorkshire Building Society opened its new headquarters in the city in 1992.

In 2006 Wm Morrison Supermarkets opened its new headquarters in the city, the firm employs more than 5,000 people in Bradford.

In June 2009 Bradford became the world's first UNESCO City of Film and became part of the Creative Cities Network since then. The city has a long history of producing both films and the technology that produces moving film—including the invention of the Cieroscope in Manningham in 1896.

In 2010 Provident Financial opened its new headquarters in the city. The company has been based in the city since 1880.

In 2012 the British Wool Marketing Board opened its new headquarters in the city. Also in 2012 Bradford City Park opened. The park cost £24.5 million to construct, and is a public space in the city centre that features numerous fountains and a mirror pool surrounded by benches and a walk way.

In 2015 The Broadway opened, the shopping and leisure complex in the centre of Bradford cost £260 million to build and is owned by Meyer Bergman.

In 2022, Bradford was named the UK City of Culture 2025, beating Southampton, Wrexham and Durham. The UK City of Culture bid, as of 2023, was expected to majorly stimulate the local economy and culture as well as attracting tourism to the city. By 2025, the UK City of Culture bid is expected to support potential economic growth of £389 million to the city of Bradford as well as to the surrounding local areas, creating over 7,000 jobs, attracting a significant amount of tourists to the city and providing thousands of performance opportunities for local artists.

== Governance ==
Bradford played an important part in the early history of the Labour Party. A mural on the back of the Bradford Playhouse, visible from Leeds Road, commemorates the centenary of the founding of the Independent Labour Party in 1893, and quotes its motto "There is no weal save commonweal".

The original Independent Labour Party logo

The original Bradford Coat of Arms had the Latin words Labor omnia vincit below it, meaning "Work conquers all". A new coat of arms was emblazoned in 1976, after local government reorganisation in 1974, with the English motto "Progress, Industry, Humanity".

Bradford is represented by three MPs: for the constituencies of Bradford East (Imran Hussain, Labour Party), Bradford South (Judith Cummins, Labour), and Bradford West (Naz Shah, Labour Party).

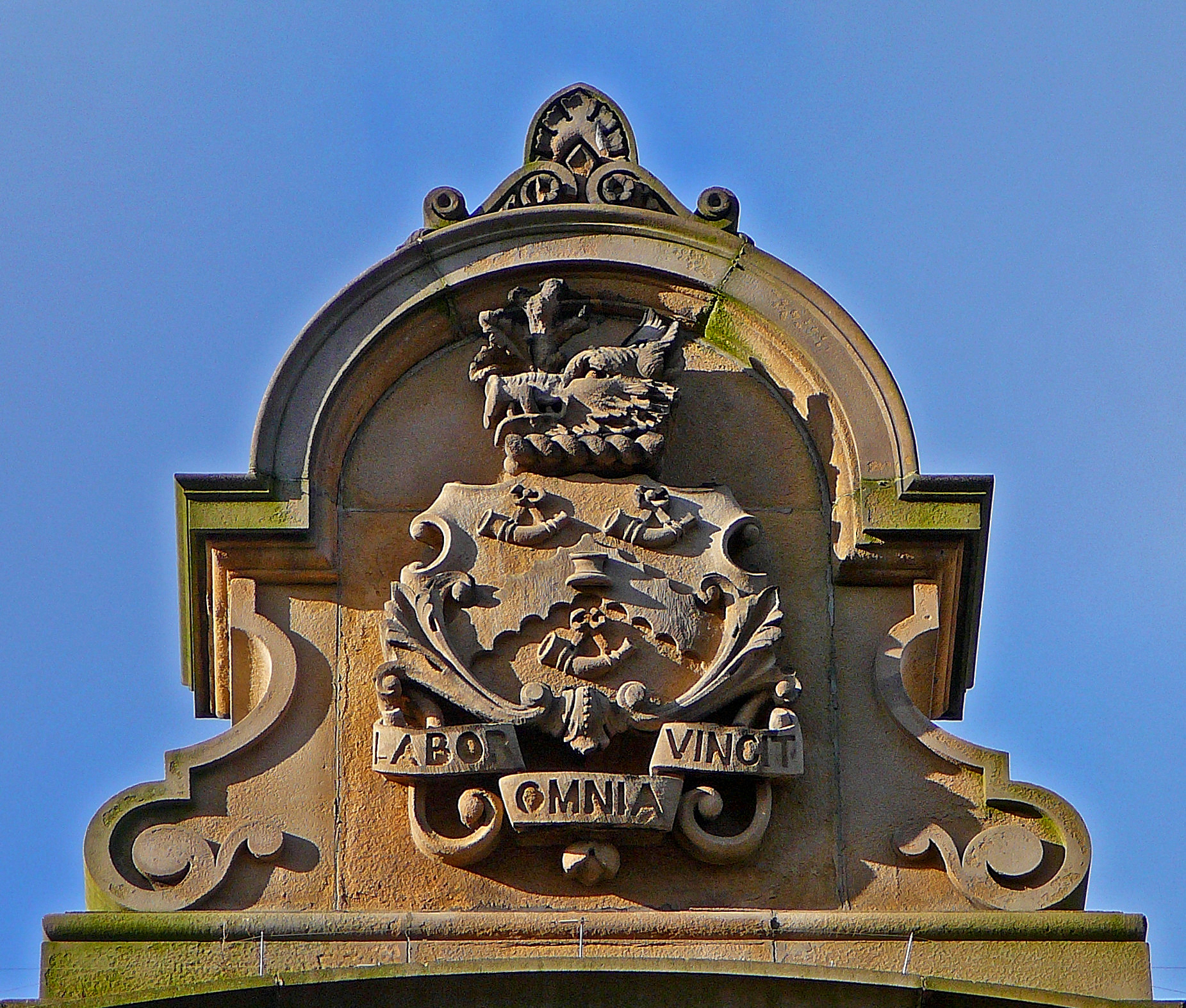
The original Bradford Coat of Arms with the Motto "Labor Omnia Vincit"

Bradford was part of the Yorkshire and the Humber European constituency, which elected six Members of the European Parliament (MEPs) using the D'Hondt method of party-list proportional representation, until the UK exit from the European Union in January 2020.

The City of Bradford Metropolitan District Council has 90 councillors. As of 2023, a political party must hold more than 45 seats to control of the council. A minority-led administration occurs when all parties hold less than 45 seats on the council. Following local elections in May 2022, Labour had majority control over Bradford council with 56 seats; this was followed by Conservatives and the Green Party with 16 and 8 seats, respectively. The council was led by council leader Susan Hinchliffe, representing the Windhill and Wrose ward, and chief executive Kersten England.

== Geography ==
Bradford is located at 53°45′00″N 01°50′00″W (53.7500, −1.8333)^{1}. Topographically, it is located in the eastern foothills of the South Pennines moorland region.

Bradford is not built on any substantial body of water, but is situated at the junction of three valleys. One of the valleys, the Bradford Beck, rises in moorland to the west—swelled by its tributaries, the Horton Beck, Westbrook, Bowling Beck, and Eastbrook. At the site of the original ford, the beck turns north, and flows towards the River Aire at Shipley. Bradfordale, or Bradforddale, is a name given to this valley.

It can be regarded as one of the Yorkshire Dales, though as it passes through the city, it is often not recognised as such. The beck's course through the city centre is culverted and has been since the mid-19th century. On the 1852 Ordnance Survey map it is visible as far as Sun Bridge, at the end of Tyrrell Street, and then from beside Bradford Forster Square railway station on Kirkgate. On the 1906 Ordnance Survey, it disappears at Tumbling Hill Street, off Thornton Road, and appears north of Cape Street, off Valley Road, though there are culverts as far as Queens Road.

The Bradford Canal, built in 1774, linking Bradford to the Leeds and Liverpool Canal, took its water from Bradford Beck and its tributaries. The supply of water from the polluted Bradford Beck was often inadequate to feed the locks and heavily polluted the canal over time. Due to the polluted state of the canal causing health problems, the council temporarily closed the canal in 1866. In 1922, the canal was permanently closed due to it not being economically viable to maintain the canal. In modern times, remnants of the canal can still be found, including by Canal Road where the route of the old canal can be seen by car.

Bradford Southern Gateway, a 126 hectares (310 acres) redevelopment area, is earmarked for future housing development backed by a share of public funding announced by the West Yorkshire Combined Authority in June 2026.

=== Geology ===
The underlying geology of the city is primarily carboniferous sandstones. These vary in quality from rough rock to fine, honey-coloured stone of building quality. Access to this material has had a pronounced effect on the architecture of the city. Bradford lies within the north western parts of the Yorkshire Coalfield, which is mostly composed of carboniferous coal measures. The coal measures stimulated early urban development. Today, geological extraction of minerals is heavily reduced in terms of scale.

=== Climate ===
As with the vast majority of the UK, Bradford experiences a maritime climate (Köppen: Cfb), with limited seasonal temperature ranges, and generally moderate rainfall throughout the year. Records have been collected since 1908 from the Met Office's weather station at Lister Park, a short distance north of the city centre. This constitutes one of the nation's longest unbroken records of daily data. The full record can be found on the council's website.

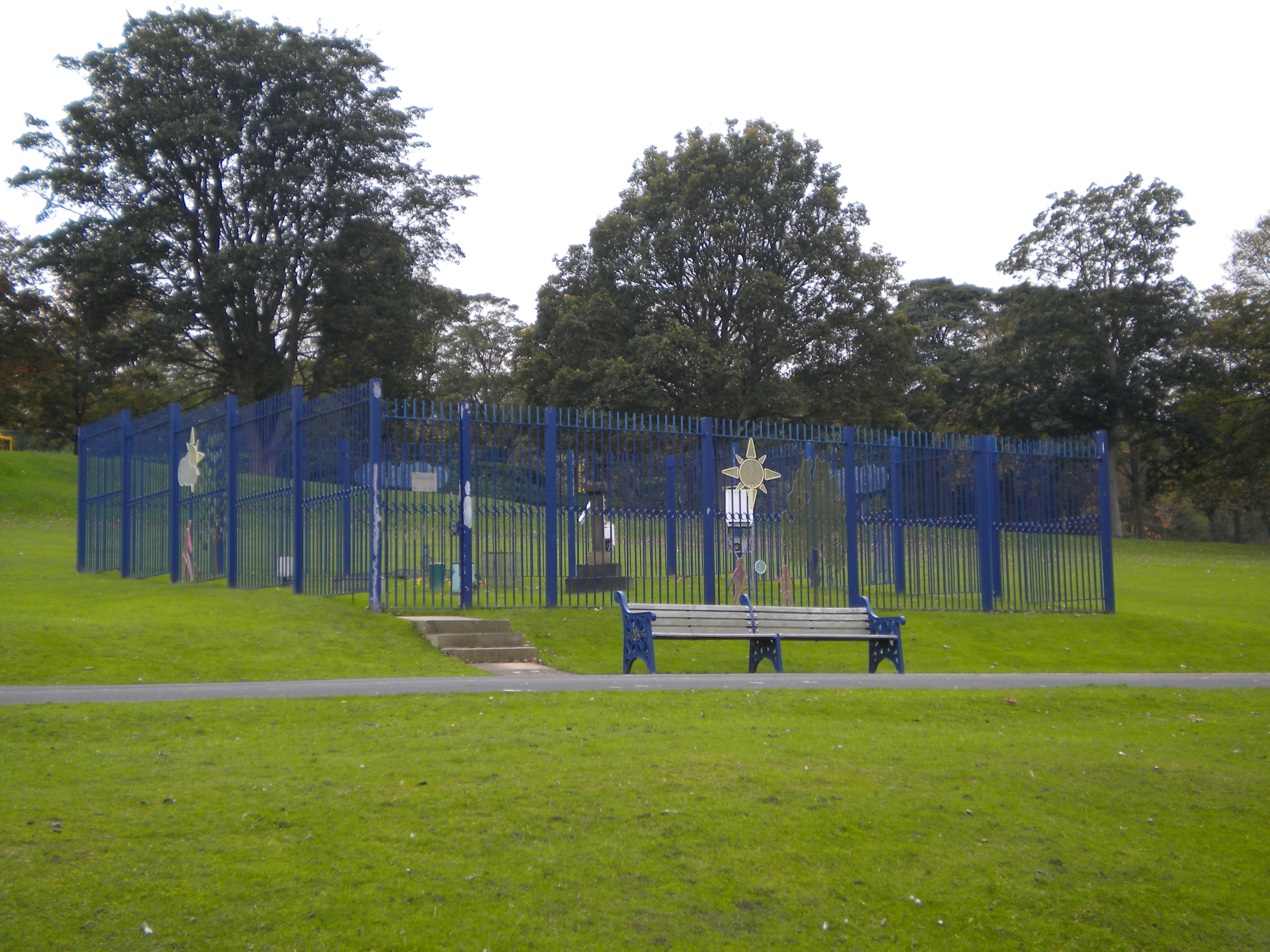
The weather station enclosure at Lister Park

The absolute maximum temperature recorded was 37.9 °C (100.2 °F) in July 2022. In an 'average' year, the warmest day should attain a temperature of 27.5 °C (81.5 °F), with 6 days rising to a maximum of 25.1 °C (77.2 °F) or above.

The absolute minimum temperature recorded was −13.9 °C (7.0 °F) during January 1940. The weather station's elevated suburban location means exceptionally low temperatures are unknown. Typically, 41.4 nights of the year will record an air frost.

Rainfall averages around 870 mm (34 in) per year, with over 1 mm of rain falling an average of 139 days.

Sunshine, at little in excess of 1,250 hours per year is low, as one would expect of an inland location in Northern England located amongst upland areas. All averages refer to the 1981–2010 observation period.

Climate data for Bradford (Lister Park), (Note: Weather station is located 2 miles (3 km) from the Bradford city centre.) elevation: 134 m (440 ft), 1991–2020 normals, extremes 1908–present
Month	Jan	Feb	Mar	Apr	May	Jun	Jul	Aug	Sep	Oct	Nov	Dec	Year
Record high °C (°F)	14.6 (58.3)	18.4 (65.1)	21.7 (71.1)	23.9 (75.0)	30.9 (87.6)	30.0 (86.0)	37.9 (100.2)	32.2 (90.0)	27.2 (81.0)	25.6 (78.1)	17.1 (62.8)	15.8 (60.4)	37.9 (100.2)
Mean daily maximum °C (°F)	6.8 (44.2)	7.4 (45.3)	9.5 (49.1)	12.5 (54.5)	15.7 (60.3)	18.2 (64.8)	20.4 (68.7)	19.8 (67.6)	17.2 (63.0)	13.4 (56.1)	9.6 (49.3)	7.2 (45.0)	13.1 (55.6)
Daily mean °C (°F)	4.3 (39.7)	4.6 (40.3)	6.2 (43.2)	8.6 (47.5)	11.5 (52.7)	14.2 (57.6)	16.3 (61.3)	15.9 (60.6)	13.5 (56.3)	10.3 (50.5)	6.8 (44.2)	4.6 (40.3)	9.7 (49.5)
Mean daily minimum °C (°F)	1.8 (35.2)	1.8 (35.2)	2.9 (37.2)	4.7 (40.5)	7.2 (45.0)	10.1 (50.2)	12.2 (54.0)	12.0 (53.6)	9.9 (49.8)	7.1 (44.8)	4.1 (39.4)	2.0 (35.6)	6.3 (43.3)
Record low °C (°F)	−13.9 (7.0)	−13.3 (8.1)	−11.1 (12.0)	−10.6 (12.9)	−3.0 (26.6)	0.6 (33.1)	5.0 (41.0)	2.8 (37.0)	0.3 (32.5)	−4.1 (24.6)	−7.8 (18.0)	−13.1 (8.4)	−13.9 (7.0)
Average precipitation mm (inches)	88.4 (3.48)	73.8 (2.91)	64.0 (2.52)	57.8 (2.28)	52.0 (2.05)	72.5 (2.85)	64.2 (2.53)	73.7 (2.90)	69.5 (2.74)	84.4 (3.32)	90.3 (3.56)	99.0 (3.90)	889.6 (35.02)
Average precipitation days (≥ 1.0 mm)	14.4	12.1	11.3	10.6	9.9	10.1	10.3	11.5	10.7	12.5	14.3	14.5	142.1
Mean monthly sunshine hours	43.2	67.7	105.2	142.1	173.3	159.4	167.2	156.1	122.8	89.7	54.9	38.0	1,319.4
Source 1: Met Office (Note: Data was calculated from Met Office raw monthly long term data from 1991–2020.)
Source 2: ECA&D

=== Green belt ===
Bradford is within a green belt region that extends into the borough and wider surrounding counties. It is in place to reduce urban sprawl, prevent the towns in the West Yorkshire Urban Area conurbation from further convergence, protect the identity of outlying communities, encourage brownfield reuse, and preserve nearby countryside. This is achieved by restricting inappropriate development within the designated areas, and imposing stricter conditions on permitted building.

The green belt surrounds the Bradford built-up area, separating towns and villages throughout the borough. Larger outlying communities such as Bingley, Wilsden, Cottingley, and Thornton are also exempt from the green belt area. However, nearby smaller villages, hamlets and rural areas such as Brunthwaite, Keelham, Denholme Gate, Laycock, Esholt, Micklethwaite, Goose Eye, Stanbury, Hainworth, Tong, and Harecroft are 'washed over' by the designation. Much semi-rural land on the fringes is also included. The area in 2017 amounted to some 23,890 hectares (238.9 km^{2}; 92.2 sq mi).

A subsidiary aim of the green belt is to encourage recreation and leisure interests, with rural landscape features, greenfield areas and facilities including Park Wood, Northcliffe park and woods, Heaton Woods, Chellow Dene woods and reservoirs, Horton Bank country park, Norr Hill, Gilstead recreation park, Stone Circle remains by Shipley Glen, Bracken Hall, River Aire valley, Leeds and Liverpool canal, and the Leeds Country Way. In May 2025, West Yorkshire's first national nature reserve, Bradford Pennine Gateway, was created from parts of Penistone Hill, Shipley Glen, and Ilkley Moor.

== Demography ==
Population density in the Bradford Metropolitan District Council Area from the 2011 census

Bradford District's ethnic demography, 1971 to 2021

In the 2021 UK census, Bradford had a population of 546,400, an increase of 23,950 since 2011. It had a population density of 1,491 people per square kilometre, making it the highest density district in West Yorkshire and ranking Bradford as one of the more densely populated areas in England. It had 209,900 households, an increase of 10,604 (5.3%) since the 2011 Census. Its median age was 36.9 years. This is younger than the Regional (40.3) and England (40.2) averages.

Based on the 2021 UK Census, 61.6% of residents identified as White, 32.1% of Bradford's population identified as Asian, Asian British, or Asian Welsh. This proportion increased from 26.8% in 2011, and places Bradford among the local authorities in England and Wales with the highest proportion of residents in this category, behind Leicester, Luton, and Blackburn with Darwen. 2.7% as Mixed, and 2.0% as Other.

Within Bradford's outlying wards such as Thornton, Allerton, Idle, Thackley, Eccleshill, Wibsey, Wyke, Clayton, Wrose, Tong, and Royds continue to have predominantly White populations., 25.5% of people specifically identified as Pakistani, which is the second-highest share for this group in any local authority area. The central wards of Toller (80.1% Asian), Bradford Moor (79.8%), Manningham (79.1%), and City all have large majority Asian populations.

Bradford Ethnicity (2011 Census)
Ethnic group	Population	%
White	352,317	67.5
Asian or Asian British	140,149	26.8
Mixed	12,979	2.5
Black or Black British	9,267	1.8
Arab	3,714	0.7
Other Ethnic Group	4,026	0.8
Total	522,452	100

Bradford Ethnicity (2021 Census)
Ethnic group	Population	%
White	333,850	61.6
Asian or Asian British	175,394	32.1
Mixed	14,753	2.7
Black or Black British	10,928	2.0
Other Ethnic Group	10,928	2.0
Total	546,400	100

== Economy ==
Bradford's textile industry has been in decline for many years and the city has suffered from de-industrialisation. Some areas of Bradford are among the worst levels of social deprivation in the UK, with widespread pockets of exclusion, and rates of unemployment in some wards exceeding 25%, though other areas of Bradford are among the least deprived in the UK. The economy is worth around £9.5 billion, making Bradford's economy a major powerhouse in the region and is forecast to grow to more than £10 billion by 2018, contributing around 8.4% of the region's output, and making the district the third largest (after Leeds and Sheffield) in Yorkshire & Humber.

The economy has diversified and the city is home to several major companies, notably in finance (Yorkshire Building Society, Provident Financial, Santander UK), textiles (British Wool Marketing Board, Bulmer and Lumb Group), chemicals (BASF, Nufarm UK), electronics (Arris International, Filtronic), engineering (NG Bailey, Powell Switchgear), and manufacturing, (Denso Marston, Bailey Offsite, Hallmark Cards UK and Seabrook Potato Crisps). Supermarket chain Morrisons has its head office in Bradford as does water utility company Yorkshire Water.

Vanquis Banking Group, formerly Provident Financial plc, has moved into a 250,000 sq ft (23,000 m^{2}), £45 million, flagship headquarters building in the city centre. The building also houses a 200-bed Jurys Inn hotel.

In October 2011 Plans to regenerate Bradford city centre, including the long-delayed Broadway shopping centre, was given a boost as Bradford Council secured £17.6 million of regional growth funding from the government, which it will match to create a £35 million "growth zone" in which companies would get business rate relief in exchange for helping people get training and jobs.

In April 2012 retail giant Freeman Grattan Holdings secured a deal to open a new head office and house around 300 staff in the centre of Bradford. The mail order and online retailer will transfer office staff from its Lidget Green base, where Grattan has had a presence since 1934, to a Grade II-listed former wool warehouse on the edge of Little Germany.

As of 2023, Bradford is currently developing city regeneration projects in conjunction with the successful City of Culture 2025 bid. With one of the most major redevelopments being the regeneration of the local Bradford Odeon building in the city centre into "Bradford Live", a £22 million music venue with a capacity of 4,000. In addition to Bradford Live, some other major projects are being developed in the city including:

• One City Park, a £30 million development in Bradford City Park for a major corporate office building.

• High Point, a £11 million development transforming the former Yorkshire Building Society building into residential apartments.

• Bradford Central Rail Station, a planned central rail station integrated with "mass transit".

• Darley Street Market, a £23 million commercial development including three trading floors.

In addition to the regeneration projects, existing buildings within the city centre will be demolished—including demolishing the NCP car park to expand and improve the current Bradford Interchange.

=== Shopping ===
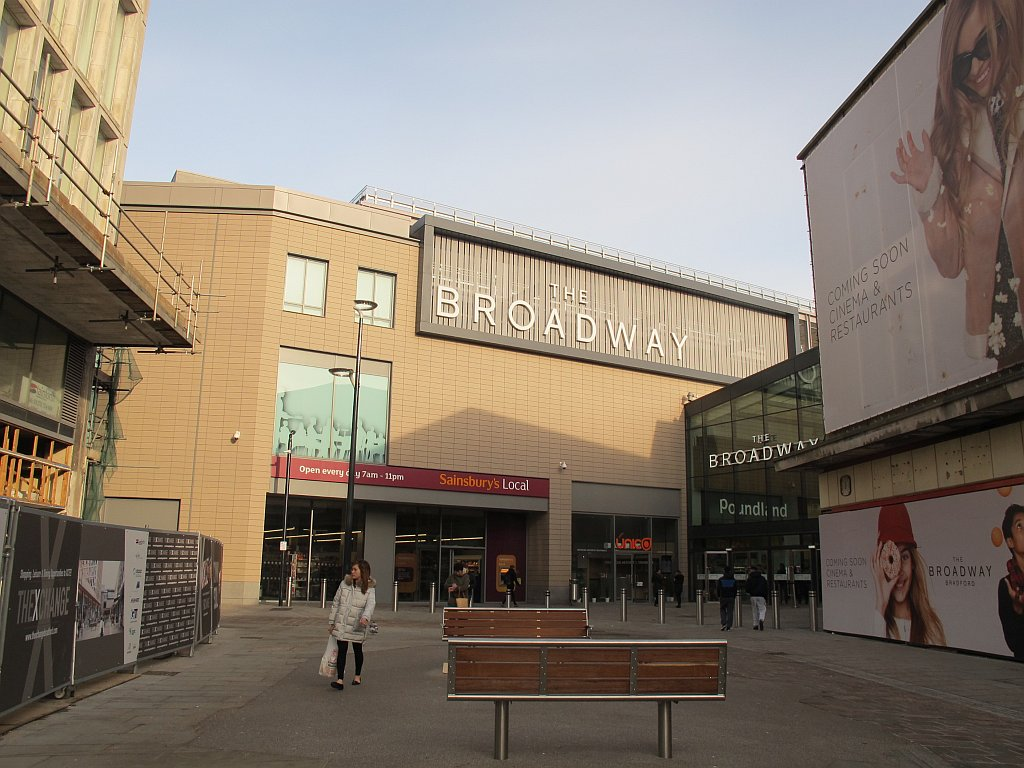
The Broadway

The Broadway is the main retail shopping facility in Bradford. It includes Next, River Island, Skechers, H&M, Khaadi, Primark, Kiko (brand), Menkind among its over 70 units.

Kirkgate Shopping Centre is located in Bradford city centre. It includes New Look, Bank, W H Smith, Boots, Boyes, SportsDirect.com, Deichmann and F. Hinds in its 65 shops, as well as an indoor market and 550 car parking spaces. The centre has undergone a multimillion-pound refurbishment recently, and plans to upgrade the facade of the 1960s building have been submitted as it anticipates competition from the long-awaited £260 million Westfield development, which opened on 5 November 2015. In 2022 it was announced that the centre would eventually be demolished for the "City Village" development and that Primark would move to The Broadway replacing the old Debenhams unit.

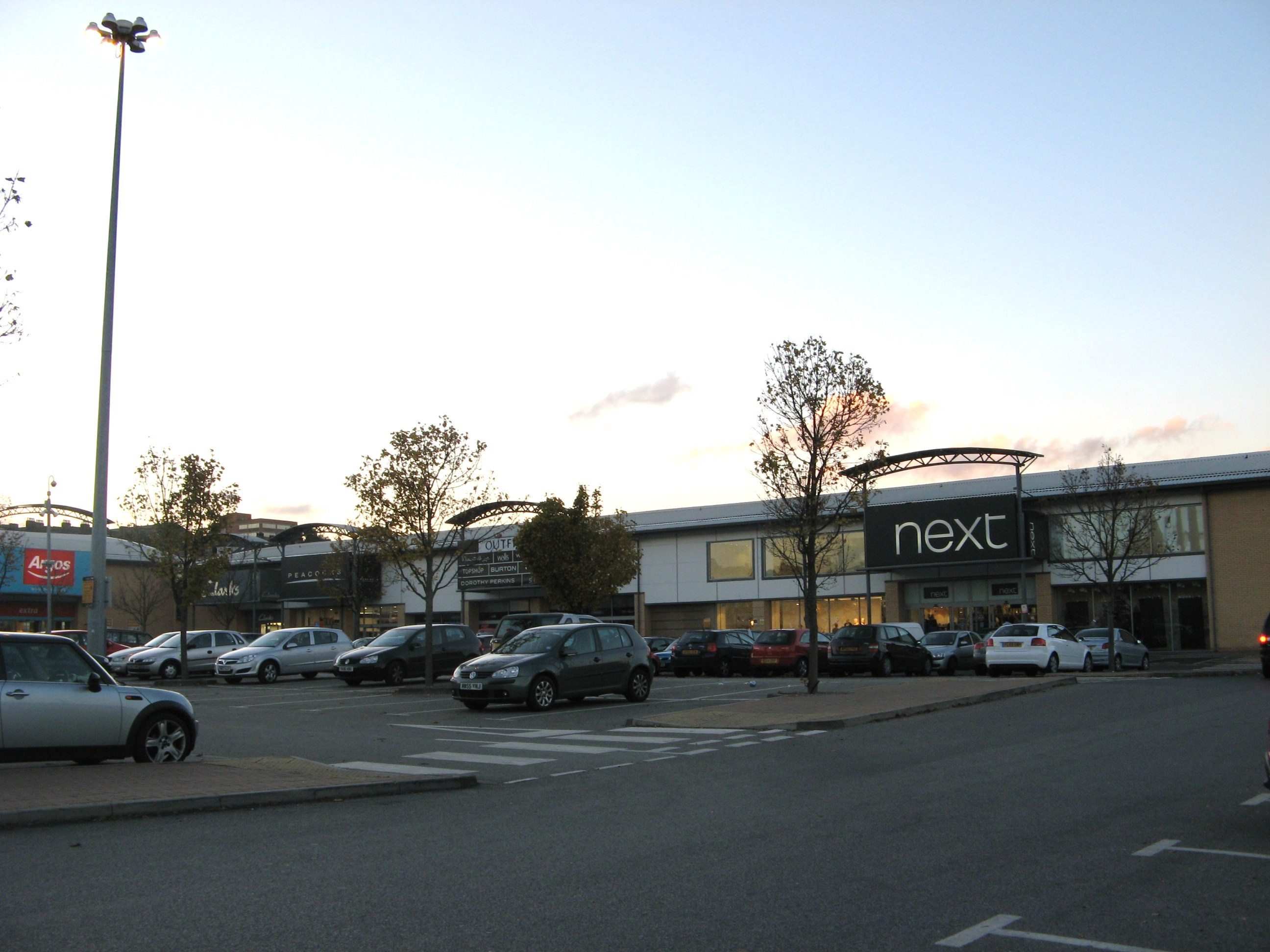
Forster Square Retail Park

Forster Square Shopping Park opened in 1995 and is adjacent to the Forster Square Railway Station. It includes over 20 large retail and food units which includes Next, Boots, Currys, TK Max and Asda Living.

Sunbridge Wells is an underground retail complex, it incorporates restaurants, bars and retail units. The complex is built in a series of Victorian tunnels situated in the centre of Bradford.

Darley St. Market is an upcoming shopping centre opening in 2024, the new shopping centre replaces existing city centre markets including the Oastler Shopping Centre and Kirkgate Market.

== Landmarks ==
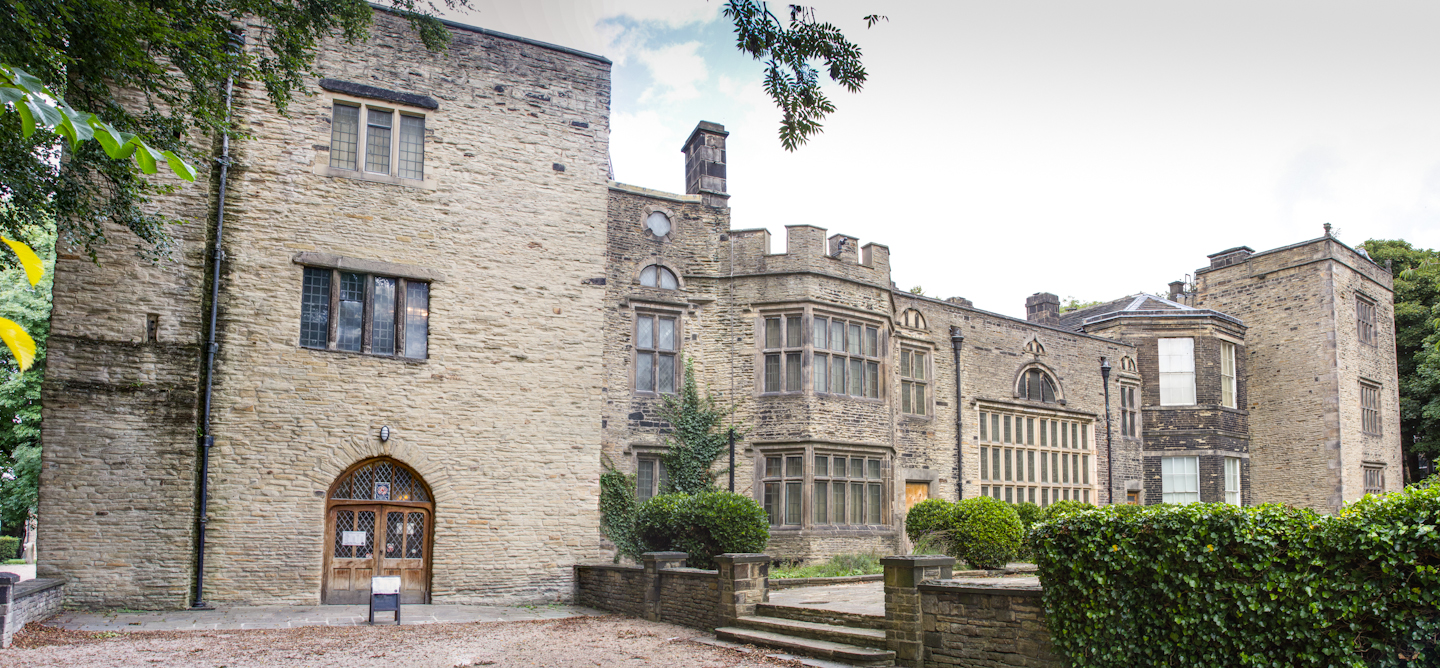
Bolling Hall

Bradford's oldest building is the cathedral, which for most of its life was a parish church. Few other medieval buildings have survived apart from Bolling Hall, which has been preserved as a museum.

The Wool Exchange, Bradford

There are some fine Victorian buildings: apart from the abundance of mills, there is the City Hall (with statues of rulers of England unusually including Oliver Cromwell), the former Wool Exchange, and a large Victorian cemetery at Undercliffe. Little Germany is a splendid Victorian commercial district just east of the city centre. Its name comes from 19th-century German Jewish immigrants who ran businesses from some of the many listed buildings. Following decades of decay, there have been successful conversions to office and residential use. Paper Hall was saved from demolition and renovated in the 1990s and in mid-2005 renovation began on the prominent Eastbrook Hall in Little Germany. This was opened as luxury apartments by Prince Charles in autumn 2008. Bradford also has a number of architecturally historic hotels that date back to the establishment of the two railway lines into the city centre, back in Victorian times. The Victoria Hotel and the Midland Hotel were built to accommodate business travellers to the city during the height of the woollen trade.

In addition to Undercliffe Cemetery, there are seven other cemeteries in Bradford, located in Bowling, Clayton, North Bierley Thornton, Queensbury, Scholemoor, Thornton and Tong, as well as a number of Council-operated cemeteries in Keighley, Wharfedale and other parts of the district.

Like many cities, Bradford lost a number of notable buildings to developers in the 1960s and 1970s: particularly mourned at the time were the Swan Arcade and the old Kirkgate Market. In recent years some buildings from that era have themselves been demolished and replaced: Provincial House, next to Centenary Square, was demolished by controlled explosion in 2002, and Forster House was pulled down in 2005 as part of the Broadway development.

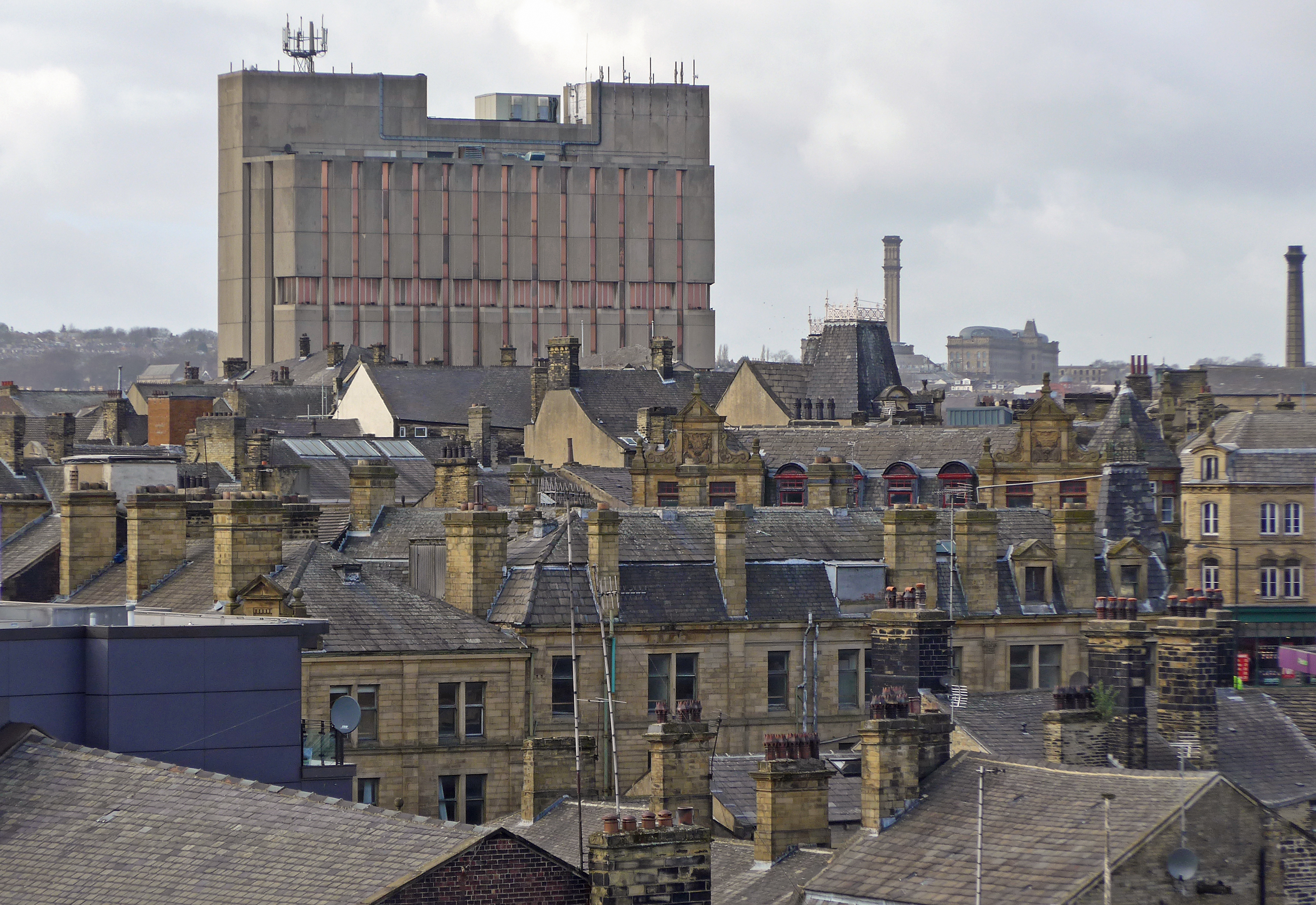
High Point viewed from Bradford city centre

The high rise High Point was built as the headquarters of the Yorkshire Building Society and completed in 1972. It is a prominent example of Brutalist architecture. It has been empty for several decades and various schemes have been proposed to bring it back into use.

Bradford's main art gallery is housed in the grand Edwardian Cartwright Hall in Lister Park. The National Science and Media Museum celebrates cinema and movies, and is the most visited museum outside London. It contains an Imax cinema, the Cubby Broccoli Cinema, and the Pictureville Cinema — described by David Puttnam as the best cinema in Britain.

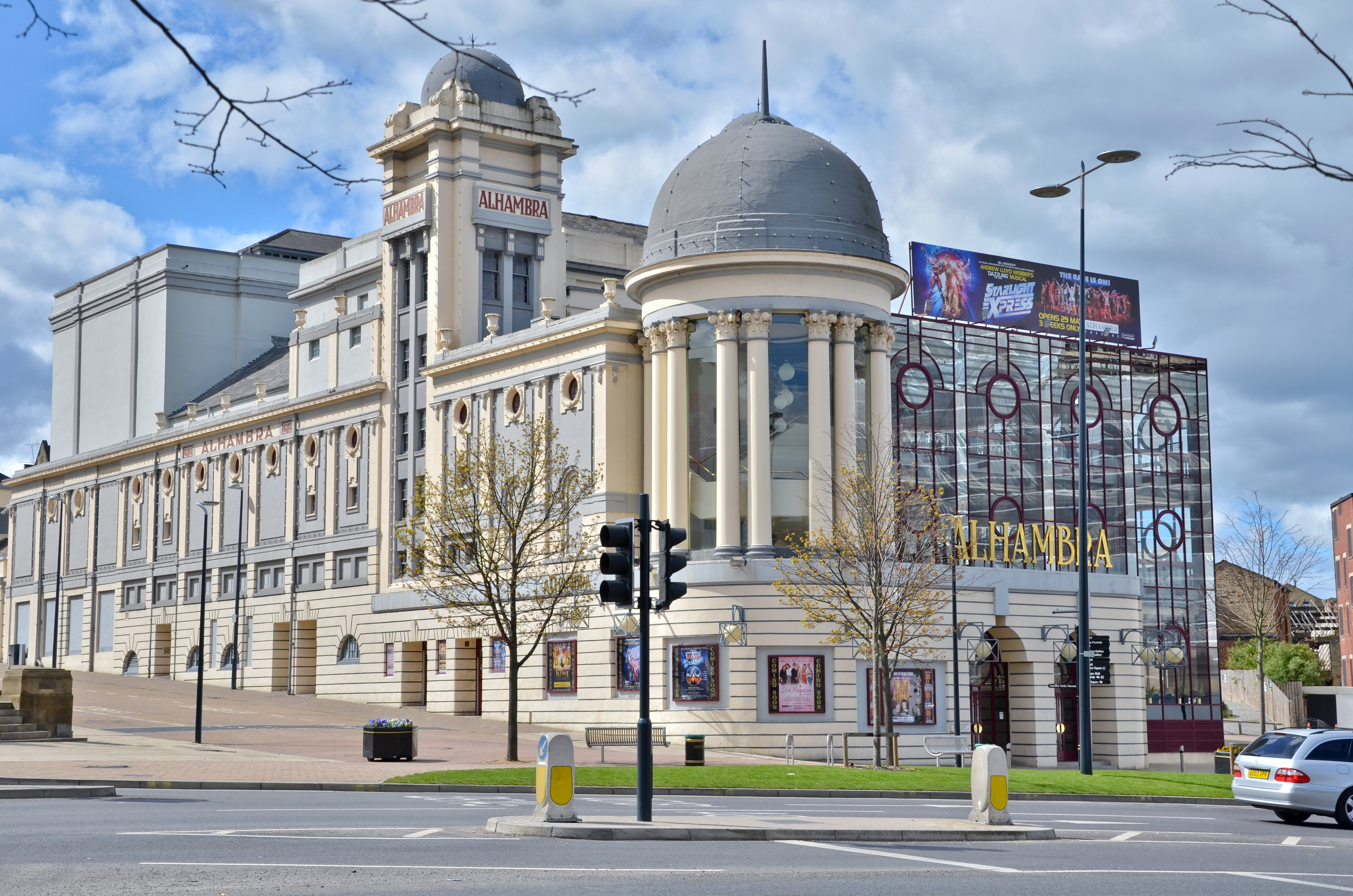
The Bradford Alhambra frequently stages hit West End and Broadway musicals.

Also in the city is The St George's Hall—a grand concert hall dating from 1853 making it the oldest concert hall in Britain and the third oldest in the whole of Europe. The Alhambra theatre, built in 1914 for theatre impresario Frank Laidler, and later owned by the Moss Empire group (Oswald Stoll and Edward Moss). The theatre was refurbished in 1986.

Within the city district there are 37 parks and gardens. Lister Park, with its boating lake and Mughal Water Gardens, was voted Britain's Best Park for 2006. Bowling Park in East Bowling is the site of the annual Bradford Carnival celebrating local African and Caribbean culture.

Bradford City Park, now home to the Bradford Festival, which includes the Mela. It is a six-acre (2.4-hectare) public space in the heart of Bradford that contains the largest man-made water feature in any UK city. A 4,000 m^{2} (43,000 sq ft) mirror pool features more than 100 fountains, including the tallest in any UK city at 30 m (100 ft). When the mirror pool is drained, City Park holds events such as carnivals, markets, theatre productions, screenings and community festivals. Work started on the £24 million project in February 2010 and City Park officially opened in March 2012, with thousands of people turning out for the grand opening event.

The Mirror Pool in City Park

The Bradford Odeon, formerly the Gaumont and New Victoria Theatre, was built in 1930 as a music venue and cinema with a capacity of over 3,000, and was the largest UK cinema outside London at the time. (Another Odeon, always part of the Odeon Cinemas chain, was built in the city in 1938 and demolished in 1969.) Standing in a conservation area adjacent to the listed Alhambra Theatre, it closed in 2000 and was sold to developer Langtree with the intention it would be demolished and replaced with an apartment and office block. The Odeon was the subject of much controversy over these proposals, with public support in the form of a 10,000-signature petition and campaigns for its renovation. In his successful by-election campaign for Bradford West in March 2012, George Galloway cited the restoration of the Odeon as his number one priority, later asking Prime Minister David Cameron to intervene. The architectural historian Jonathan Foyle, actresses Imelda Staunton and Jenny Agutter, and director Michael Winner all lent their support to the campaign.

=== Memorials ===
- Bradford War Memorial
- Bradford Victoria Cross Memorial
- Bradford Pals Headstone
- Bradford City Fire Memorial
- Bradford City of Peace
- Bhopal Workers' Memorial Day Plaque
- Hiroshima & Nagasaki Plaque
- Ukrainian Grove, Jacobs Well
- 1932 Ukrainian Famine Memorial
- 1986 Chernobyl Disaster Memorial

== Transport ==
In past centuries Bradford's location in Bradfordale made transport difficult, except from the north; this is no longer a problem.

=== Road ===
Bradford was first connected to the developing turnpike network in 1734, when the first Yorkshire turnpike was built between Manchester and Leeds via Halifax and the city.

It is now accessed by trunk roads: the A647 between Leeds and Halifax via Queensbury, the A650 between Wakefield and Keighley, the A658 to Harrogate and the A6036 to Halifax via Shelf.

The M606, a spur of the M62 motorway, connects Bradford with the national motorway network. Although originally planned to go directly into the city centre it ends at the city's ring road.

==== Buses ====
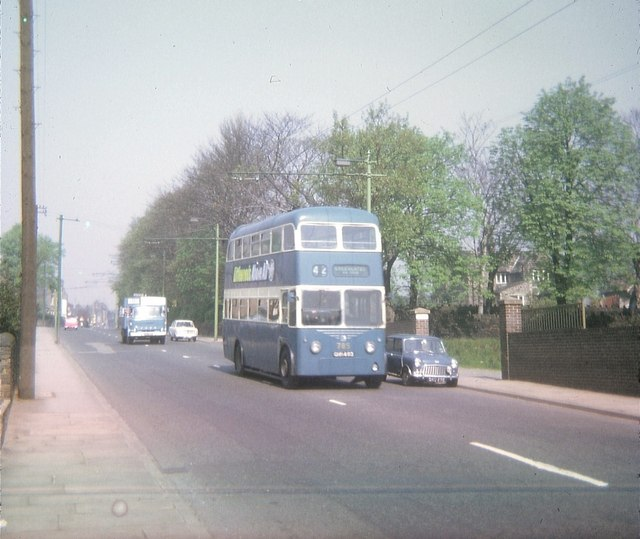
Bradford trolleybus in Leeds Road, Greengates, May 1971.

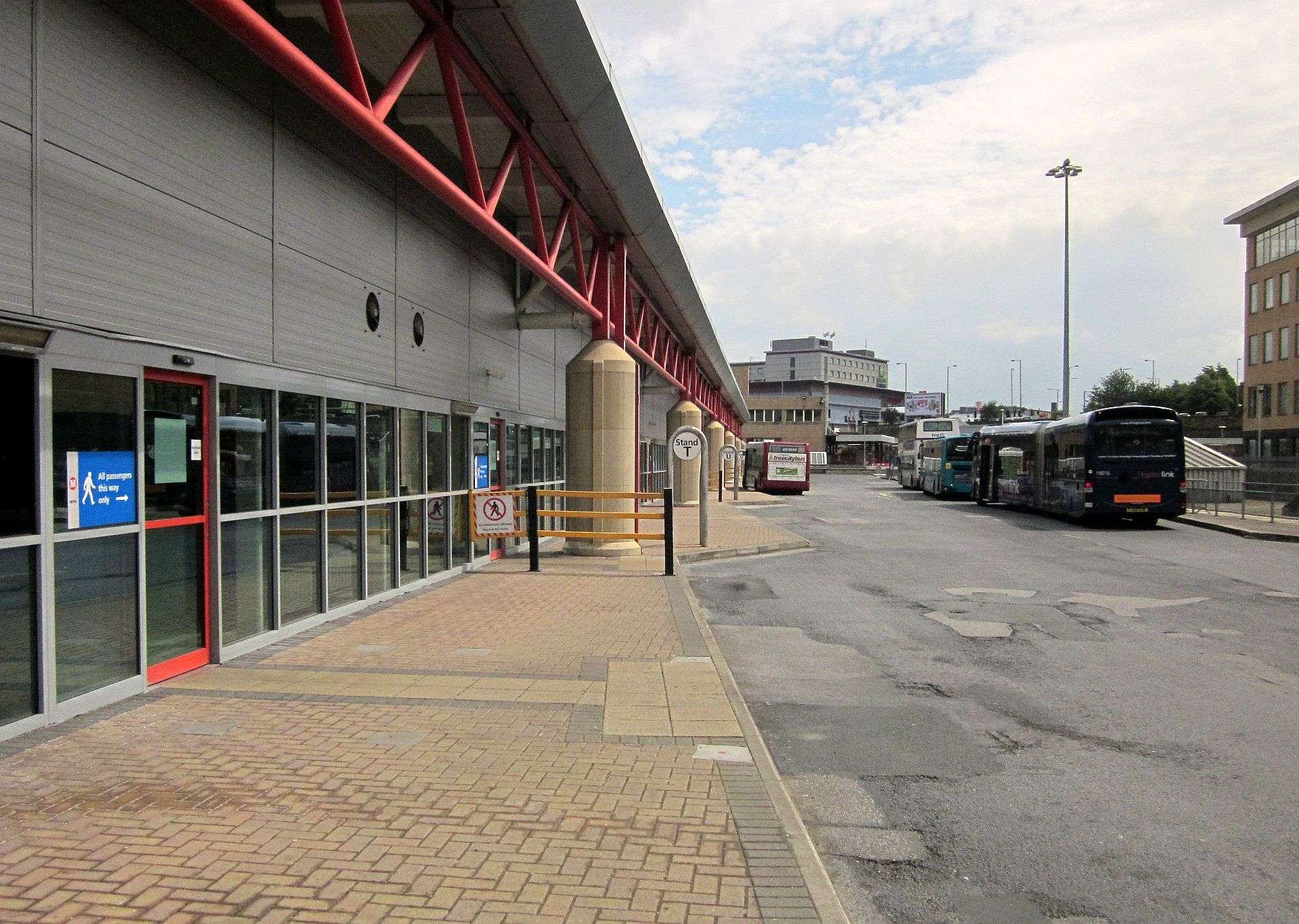
Bradford Interchange's bus end entrance

On 20 June 1911, Britain's first trolleybus systems opened simultaneously in Bradford, between Laisterdyke and Dudley Hill, and in Leeds. The last service in Bradford—and Britain—ceased operation on 26 March 1972. Ten Bradford trolleybuses are preserved at the Sandtoft Trolleybus Museum. In 1974 Bradford's municipal buses were taken over by West Yorkshire Metro. First Bradford and Arriva Yorkshire are the chief operators of buses in Bradford, with some routes using guided buses.

=== Water ===
The Bradford Canal was a 4-mile (6.4 km) spur from the Leeds and Liverpool Canal at Shipley. It was built to connect Bradford with the North Riding's limestone quarries, the industrial towns on both sides of the Pennines and the ports of Liverpool and Goole. The canal opened from 1774 until 1866 and 1871 until 1922, plans to rebuild it have existed.

=== Rail ===
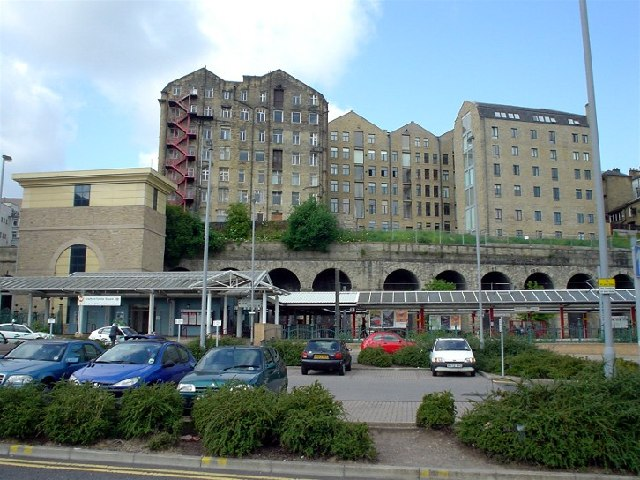
Bradford Forster Square railway station

Diagram of city centre stations in Bradford, West Yorkshire

The Leeds and Bradford Railway opened Forster Square railway station on 1 July 1846 with a service via Shipley to Leeds. The station was rebuilt in the early 1850s and again, in 1890 and 1990.

The Lancashire and Yorkshire Railway opened a station at Drake Street on 9 May 1850, between Manchester and Leeds. The Great Northern Railway opened a third terminus at Adolphus Street in 1854, but the station was too far from the centre. The two companies built a joint station, Bradford Exchange which opened in 1867. Adolphus Street remained as a goods terminal. In 1973, Exchange station was rebuilt on a different site and in 1983 renamed Bradford Interchange and a bus station built alongside.

Forster Square and Bradford Interchange stations are part of the West Yorkshire Metro. There have been many schemes to link between Bradford's railway terminals. The major redevelopment of the city centre in the 1960s provided an opportunity to connect the termini, this did not happen with large buildings constructed in the 1990s along the proposed line of route. There is the great difference in elevation: Bradford Interchange is at the end of a long steep slope and is much higher than Forster Square. This gradient is not unprecedented in railway construction and the relocation of Forster Square further from the city centre provided additional space to facilitate the transition.

A tram system was inaugurated by Bradford Corporation in 1882. At first the vehicles were horse-drawn but were replaced by steam-driven trams in 1883, and by electric vehicles in 1898. The system ran until 1950.

=== Air ===
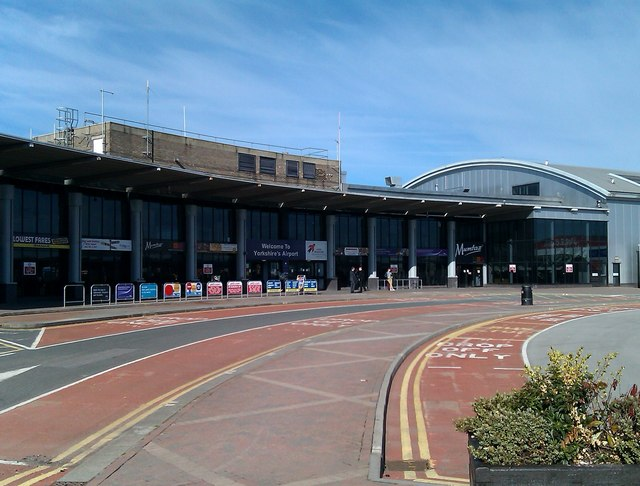
The terminal building, Leeds Bradford Airport

Leeds Bradford Airport is 6 miles (9.7 km) to the north east of the city. Bradford and Leeds councils jointly opened the airport in 1931. It is the home base of Jet2.com airlines. In May 2007 the joint councils sold the airport to Bridgepoint Capital for £145.5 million, £70 million would be invested in airport improvements by the company and expected to increase passenger usage to over 7 million by 2015.

== Education ==
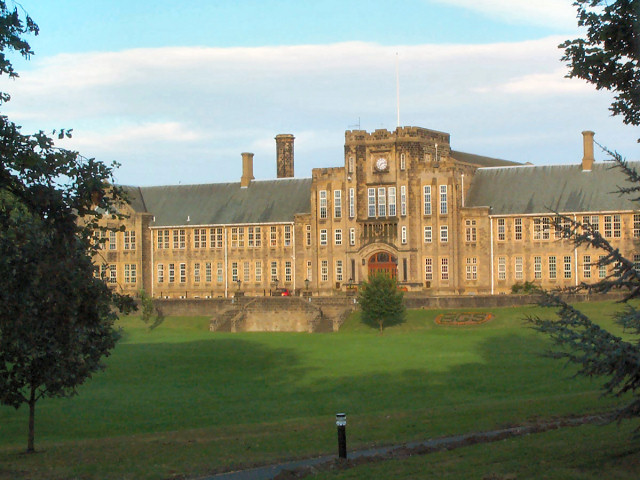
Bradford Grammar School

Bradford Grammar School was in existence near the parish church in the mid-16th century and re-established by royal charter as the Free Grammar School of Charles II in 1662.

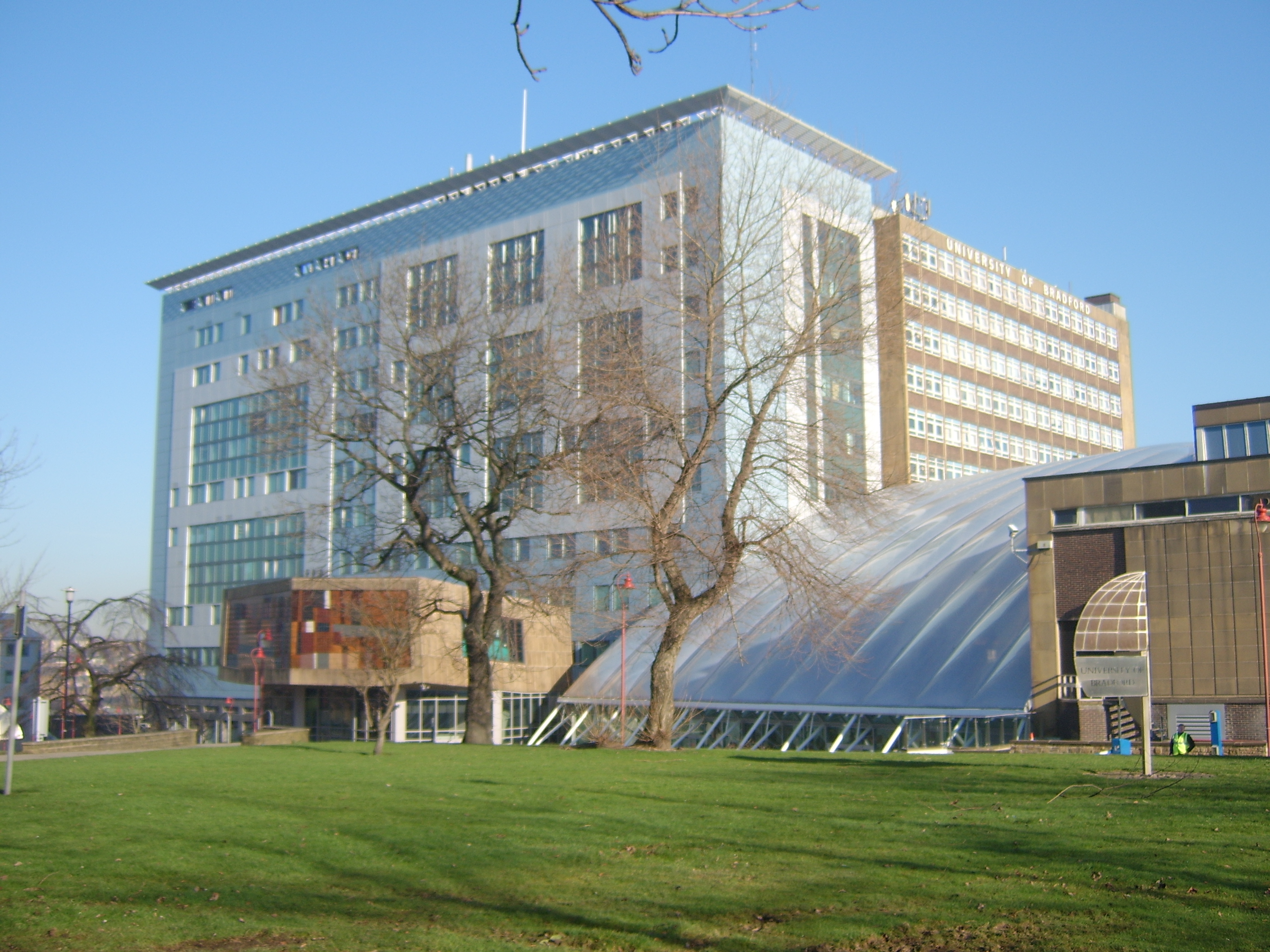
University of Bradford

The University of Bradford, which has over 10,000 students, received its royal charter in 1966, but traces its history to the 1860s when it was founded as the Bradford Schools of Weaving, Design and Building. The university now covers a wide range of subjects including technology and management science, optometry, pharmacy, medical sciences, nursing studies, archaeology and modern languages. Its Peace Studies department, founded with Quaker support in 1973, was for a long time the only such institution in the UK.

In terms of nationally recognised leading areas of research there are various departments such as Institute of Cancer Therapeutics, Bradford School of Pharmacy, Peace Studies, Archaeology, Engineering, Management, Centre for Skin Sciences amongst others. The university balances academic research and teaching quality with a strong tradition of social inclusion. The University of Bradford was ranked second in the UK for graduate employment by the Times Higher Education Supplement in 2005.

In December 2010 the university was named as the greenest in the UK for the second year running. In 2019, the university was named the UK's top university for social inclusion. Additionally, for 2021 and 2022, the university was named the top university in England for social mobility by the Higher Education Policy Institute (HEPI).

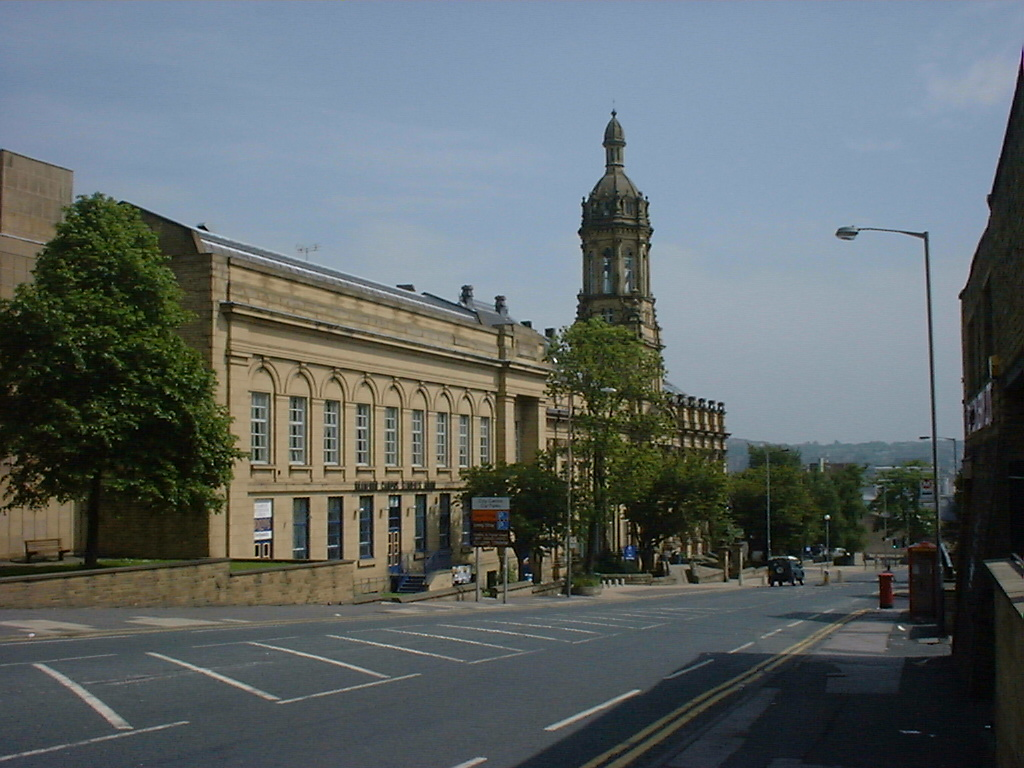
The Old Building at Bradford College founded in 1832

The University of Bradford School of Management was in 2011 rated the 14th best business school in the UK by the Financial Times. Bradford College developed from the 19th-century technical college whose buildings it inherited. It offers further and higher educational courses and is an Associate College of Leeds Metropolitan University and is the UK's largest provider of higher-education courses outside the university sector, with 23,000 students and 1,800 staff. It absorbed the Art School whose most famous alumnus is David Hockney.

Whilst in Bradford after 1892, Margaret McMillan joined the Fabian Society and the Independent Labour Party. Working with her sister, Rachel, she set about improving the welfare of children living in the slums, and campaigned for free school meals. A memorial college to Margaret McMillan was opened in 1952.

During the 2010s, Ofsted reports ranked many Bradford schools as amongst the UK's finest.

== Religion ==
Religion in Bradford (2021 census)
1. Christianity (33.4%)
2. Islam (30.5%)
3. No religion (28.2%)
4. Undeclared (5.50%)
5. Sikhism (0.90%)
6. Hinduism (0.90%)
7. Buddhism (0.20%)
8. Other religions (0.40%)

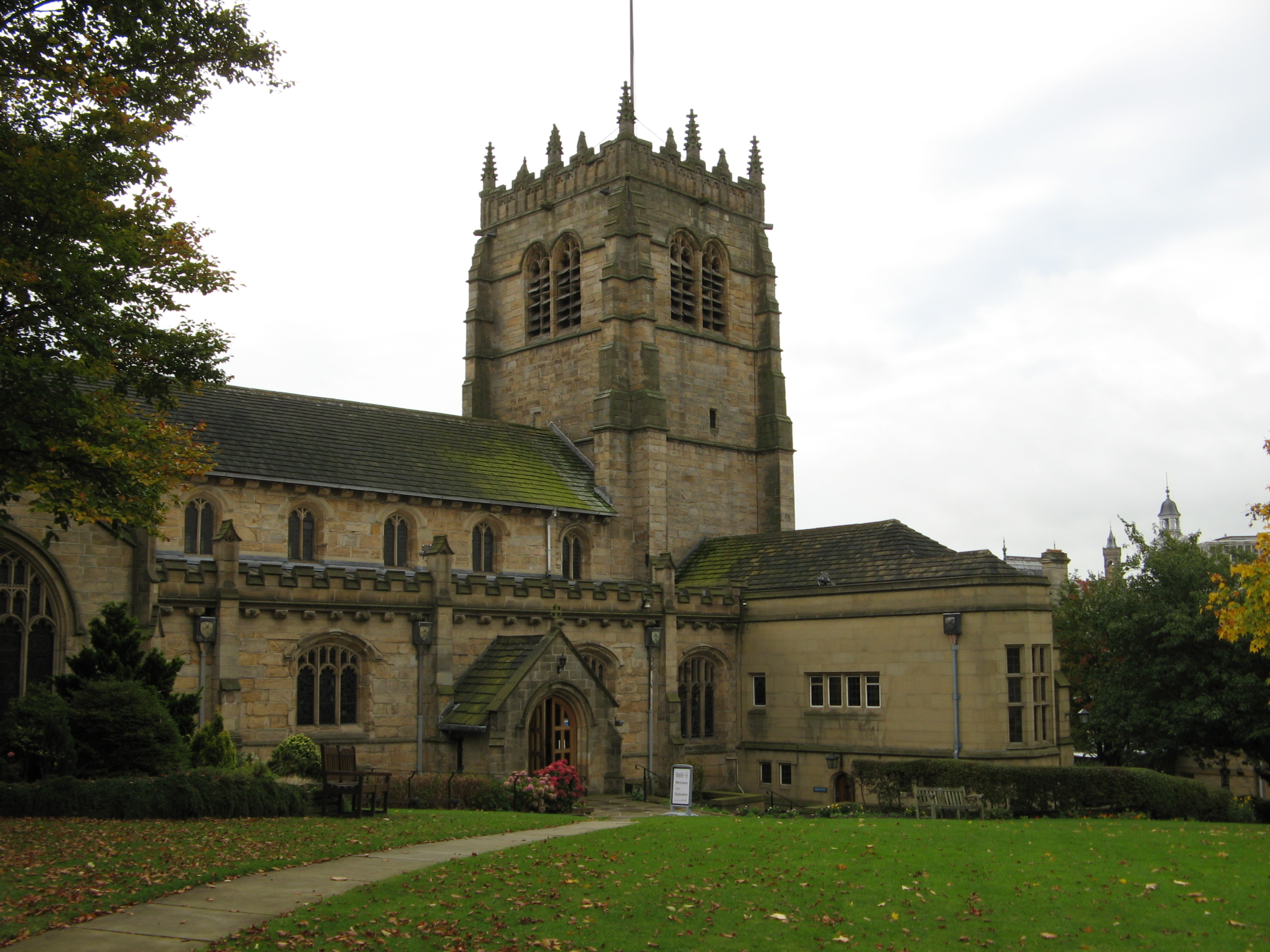
Bradford Cathedral, one of the oldest churches in Bradford

Two carved stones, probably parts of a Saxon preaching cross, were found on the site of Bradford Cathedral. They indicate that Christians may have worshipped here since Paulinus of York came to the north of England in AD 627 on a mission to convert Northumbria. He preached in Dewsbury and it was from there that Bradford was first evangelised. The vicars of Bradford later paid dues to that parish. The most prominent Christian church in Bradford is Bradford Cathedral, originally the Parish Church of St Peter. The parish was in existence by 1283, and there was a stone church on the rock shelf above Bradford Beck by 1327. The Diocese of Bradford was created from part of the Diocese of Ripon in 1919, and the church became a cathedral at that time.

Bradford has over 150 churches and chapels.

Many of the Roman Catholic churches that are found within the city are a legacy of the large Irish population that migrated to Bradford in the 19th century.

The patron saint of Bradford is Saint Blaise because of his patronage of wool combing, and his statue features on the Wool Exchange in the centre of the city. There is also a statue of the saint in St Cuthbert's Catholic Church, Wilmer Road, also noted as the location of the famous Stations of the Cross by Eric Gill.

The district has a tradition of nonconformity, reflected in the number of chapels erected by Congregationalists, Baptists, and Methodists. The city was a centre of the House Church movement in the 1980s, and the Christian charity Christians Against Poverty was founded in the city. Other house churches in the city include El Shaddai International Christian Centre and the World Outreach Church. Bradford is also home to the LIFE Church UK, a large nonconforming church, that has around 3,000 members.

Interior of the Bradford Tree of Life Synagogue

The Jewish community was strong in the middle to late 19th century and built Bradford Reform Synagogue in Manningham. This, "The oldest reform synagogue outside London", was established by German Jews who had moved to Bradford for the wool trade. According to historian Sharman Kadish, "The city of Bradford was unique in that it boasted a reform synagogue before it acquired an orthodox one". In 1881 Russian Jews made their home in Bradford, having fled their homeland, and founded an orthodox synagogue. In 2011 the Jewish population was 299.

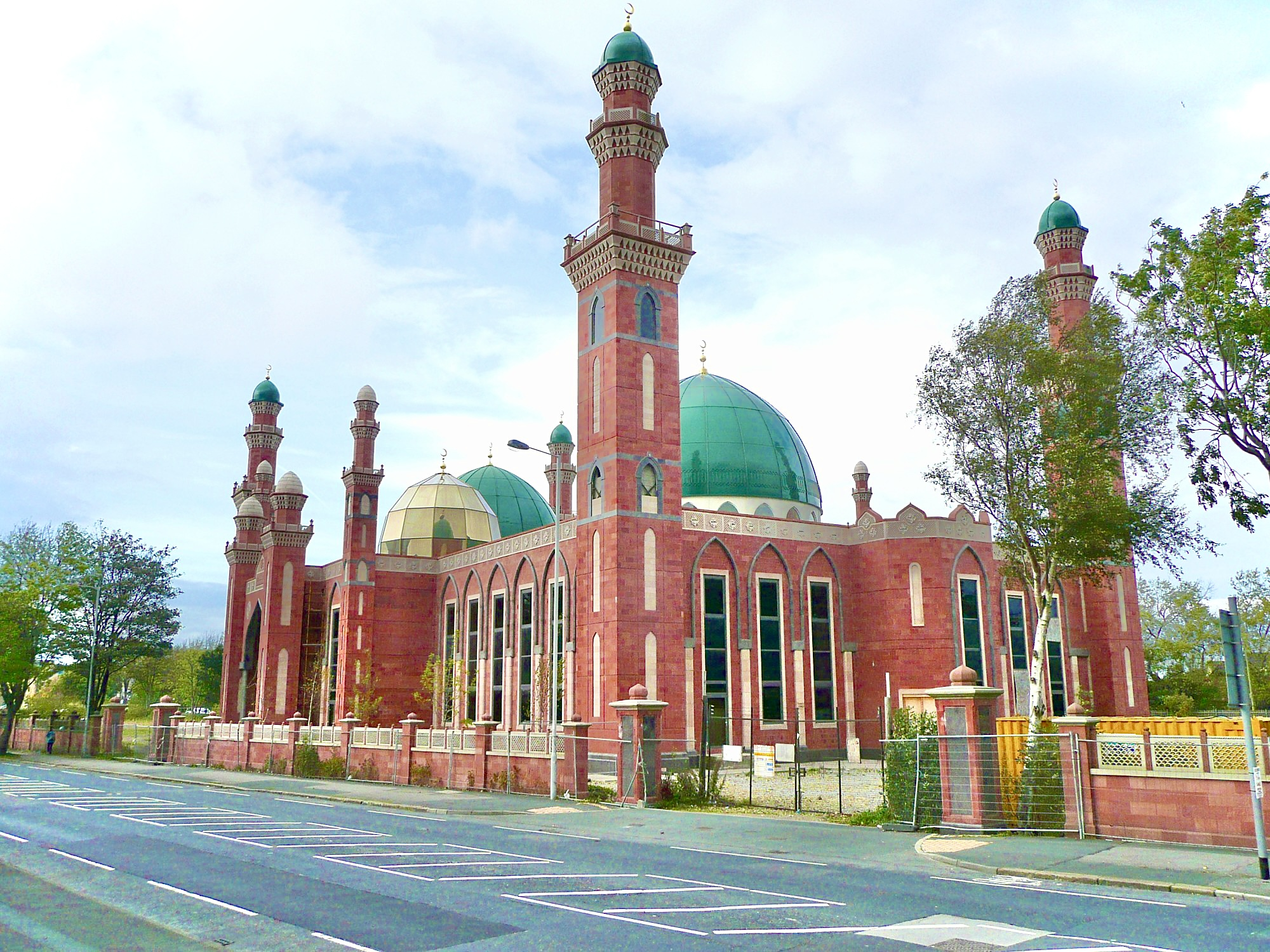
Bradford Grand Mosque on Horton Park Avenue

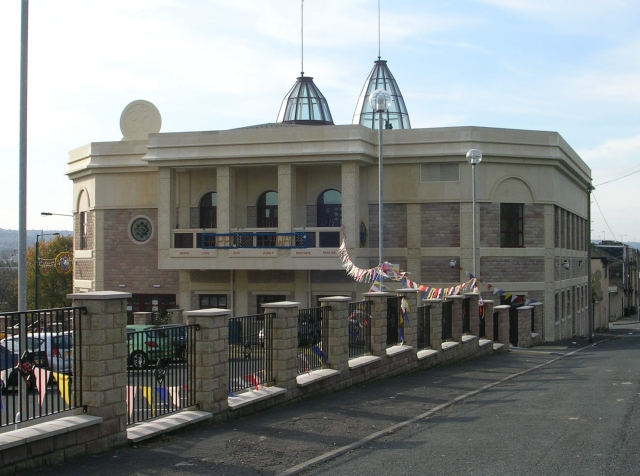
Bradford Lakshmi Narayan Hindu Temple

The city has a sizeable South Asian community and the Lakshmi Narayan mandir, which opened in April 2008 is the largest Hindu temple in northern England. There is a Hindu temple and community centre on Thornton Lane and smaller house-based mandirs.

The city has about 100 mosques, among which is the Bradford Grand Mosque, one of the largest mosques by capacity in the United Kingdom.

The Sikh community has six gurudwaras in the city. The Sikh festival of Vaisakhi is celebrated on 14 April. Sikhs travel to each of the gurudwaras in the city in a procession called a nagar kirtan.

Bradford Religion (2021 Census)
Religion	Population	%
Christian	182,566	33.4
Muslim	166,846	30.5
No Religion	154,305	28.2
Undeclared	29,816	5.5
Sikh	4,834	0.9
Hindu	4,757	0.9
Buddhist	959	0.2
Jewish	254	<0.1
Other Religion	2,074	0.4
Total	546,412	100

== Culture ==
The National Science and Media Museum hosts the Bradford International Film Festival annually in March. In June 2009 Bradford was designated the world's first UNESCO City of Film for its links to the production and distribution of films, its media and film museum and its "cinematographic legacy". "Becoming the world's first City of Film is the ultimate celebration of Bradford's established and dynamic history in film and media," said Colin Philpott, director of Bradford's National Media Museum. "With the UNESCO City of Film designation, Bradford will now go on to achieve inspirational projects in film." Simon Beaufoy from Bradford, the Oscar-winning screenwriter of Slumdog Millionaire, said the city had played a crucial role in the story of cinema and deserved to be recognised.

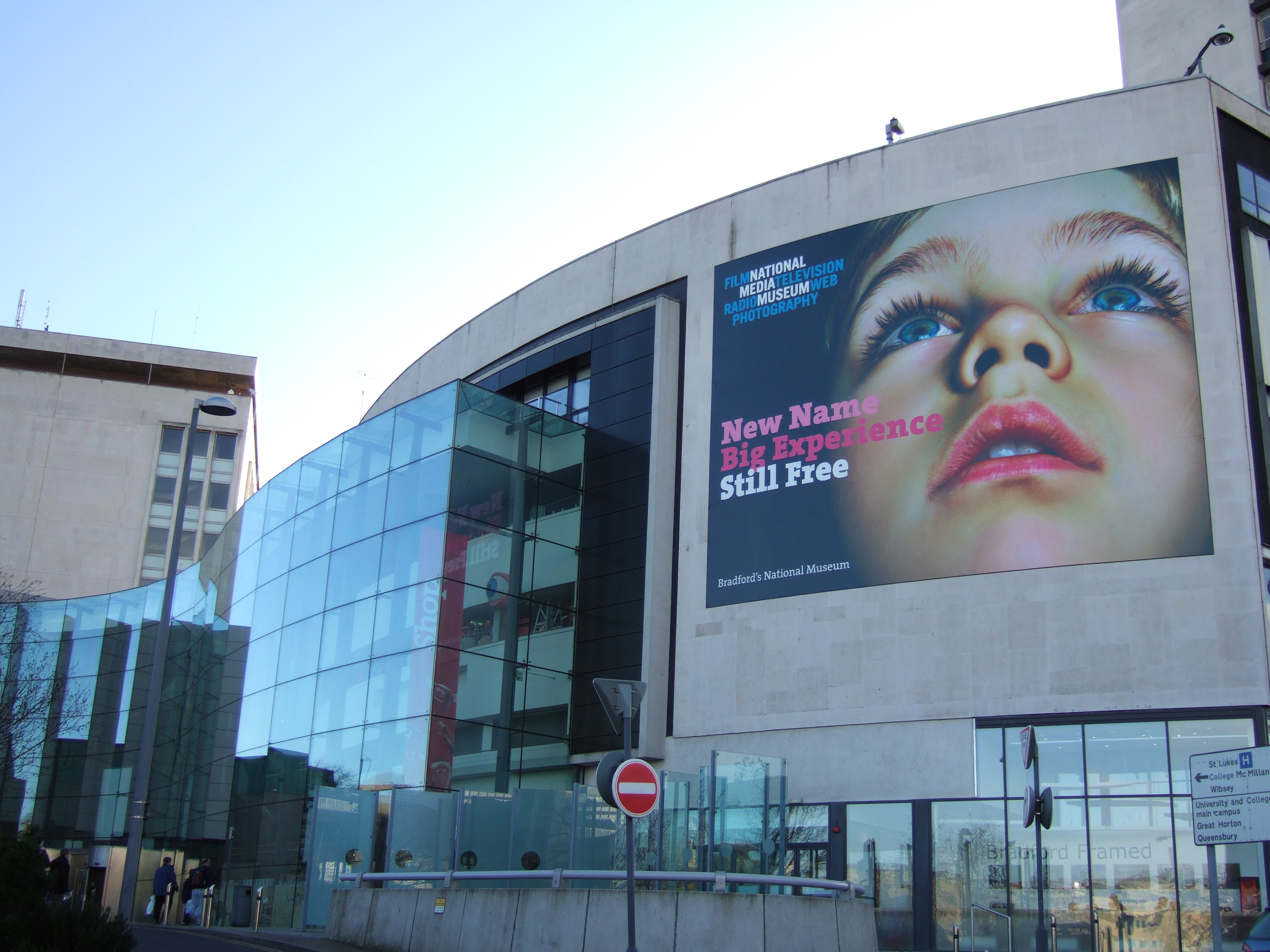
The National Science and Media Museum, Bradford

Bradford has developed a relationship with Bollywood, hosting the International Indian Film Festival awards in 2007.

The Bradford Animation Festival is the UK's longest-running animation festival. Held each November, the festival hosts an array of screen talks, workshops and special events. The festival culminates in the annual BAF Awards, which celebrate new animation from around the world.

The Cottingley Fairy photographs taken by Elsie Wright and two of the cameras used are on display in the Kodak Gallery in the National Science and Media Museum in Bradford.

There are four theatres in Bradford. The Alhambra also has a smaller studio theatre in the same complex. These are operated by City of Bradford Metropolitan District Council. The Theatre in the Mill is a small studio theatre at the University of Bradford, which presents student and community shows and small-scale touring professional work. The Bradford Playhouse is a privately run venue with a medium-sized proscenium theatre and a small studio.

Among the professional theatre companies based in Bradford are Kala Sangam, the satirical madcap comedy troop, Komedy Kollective, Lost Dog (based at Theatre in the Mill) and Mind the Gap, one of the longest established, who have always worked with a mixture of disabled and able-bodied performers. Groups and organisations teaching theatre include The Asian Theatre School, Bradford Stage and Theatre School and Stage 84. There are also a number of amateur theatre groups.

St George's Hall is a concert hall dating from 1853 making it the oldest concert hall in Britain and the third oldest in Europe. Bradford Festival Choral Society was founded to perform at the inaugural Bradford Musical Festival that took place in August of that year, and the choir is still a part of the musical life of the city. The Hallé Orchestra have been regular visitors over the years, as have a wide range of popular musicians, bands, entertainers, comedians and theatrical productions. In 2017 an £8.2 million renovation scheme of St George's Hall was started, after completion it is planned for the concert venue to re-open in late 2018.

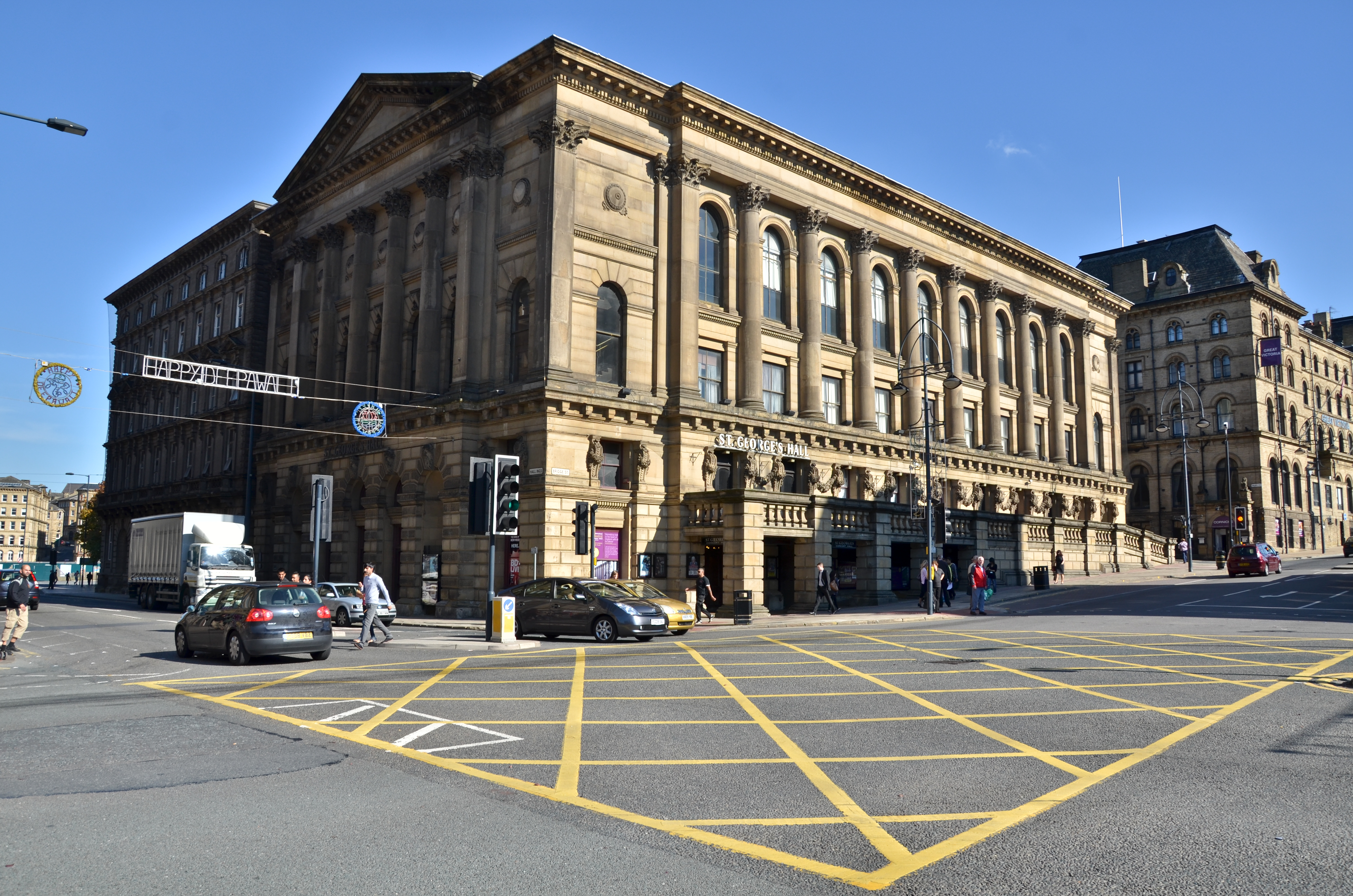
St George's Hall

Cinemas have been replaced by vast entertainment complexes with multi-screen cinemas. The Leisure Exchange in the city centre has a 16 screen Cineworld. At Thornbury, on the outskirts is the Odeon Leeds-Bradford with 13 screens, which replaced the old Odeon next to the Alhambra. The Odeon is a continuing focus of protests by Bradfordians who do not wish to see the old building demolished. The University of Bradford also has a cinema run by the Students' Union, operating from the university's Great Hall.

Nightlife in Bradford has traditionally centred on Manor Row and Manningham Lane. More recently, several clubs and pubs have opened in the West End of Bradford, around the Alhambra Theatre, turning what was a previously fairly quiet area into one that is often crowded and vibrant at night. North Parade has also seen several new themed bars open and is at the heart of the Independent Quarter of the city. Sunbridge Wells is an underground leisure and retail complex. It opened in Bradford city centre in 2016.

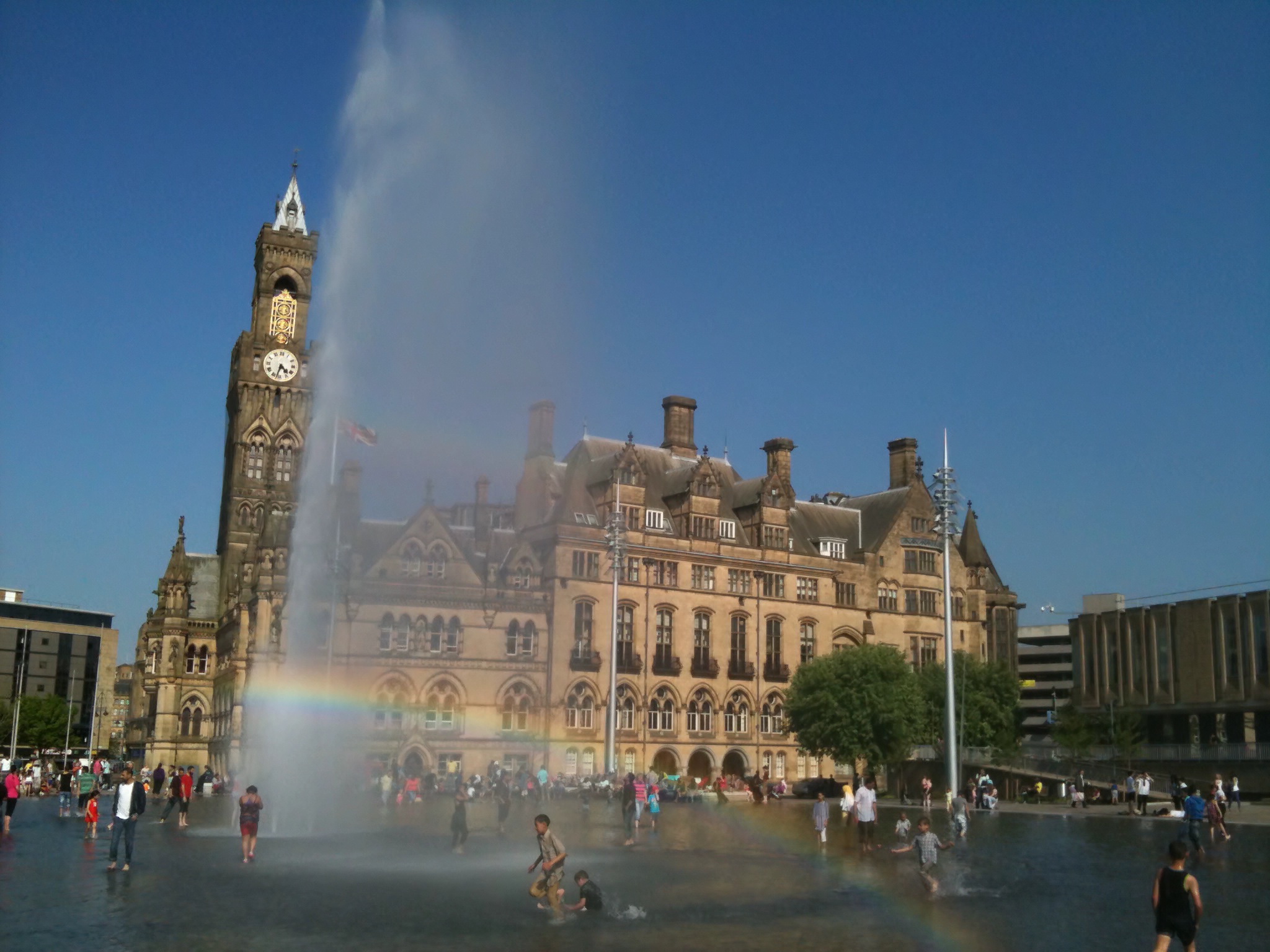
Sunny day at the City Park

Bradford was one of the first areas of the UK to get a local commercial radio station Pennine Radio in September 1975. Today, this is Hits Radio West Yorkshire and Greatest Hits Radio West Yorkshire. As of 2006, Bradford Community Broadcasting based in the city centre has broadcast on full-time Community Radio licence around Bradford and the Aire Valley, whilst the university radio station Ramair broadcasts to the student population. Bradford's only television station AAP TV caters for Bradford's large Asian community. The Telegraph and Argus is Bradford's daily newspaper, published six days each week from Monday to Saturday.

The Bradford Mela is now part of the bigger Bradford Festival in June. The word mela is Sanskrit for 'a gathering' or 'to meet'. In the UK, melas provide an opportunity for communities to come together to celebrate and share their cultures. Mela festivals include a combination of markets, funfairs, food and drink, arts and workshops, children's activities, strolling entertainment and a variety of music and dance performances on a number of stages. Bradford held the first mela in Europe in September 1988 and it is presently held in Bradford City Park.

Bradford City Park has the largest city centre water feature in the UK.

=== Museums and art galleries ===
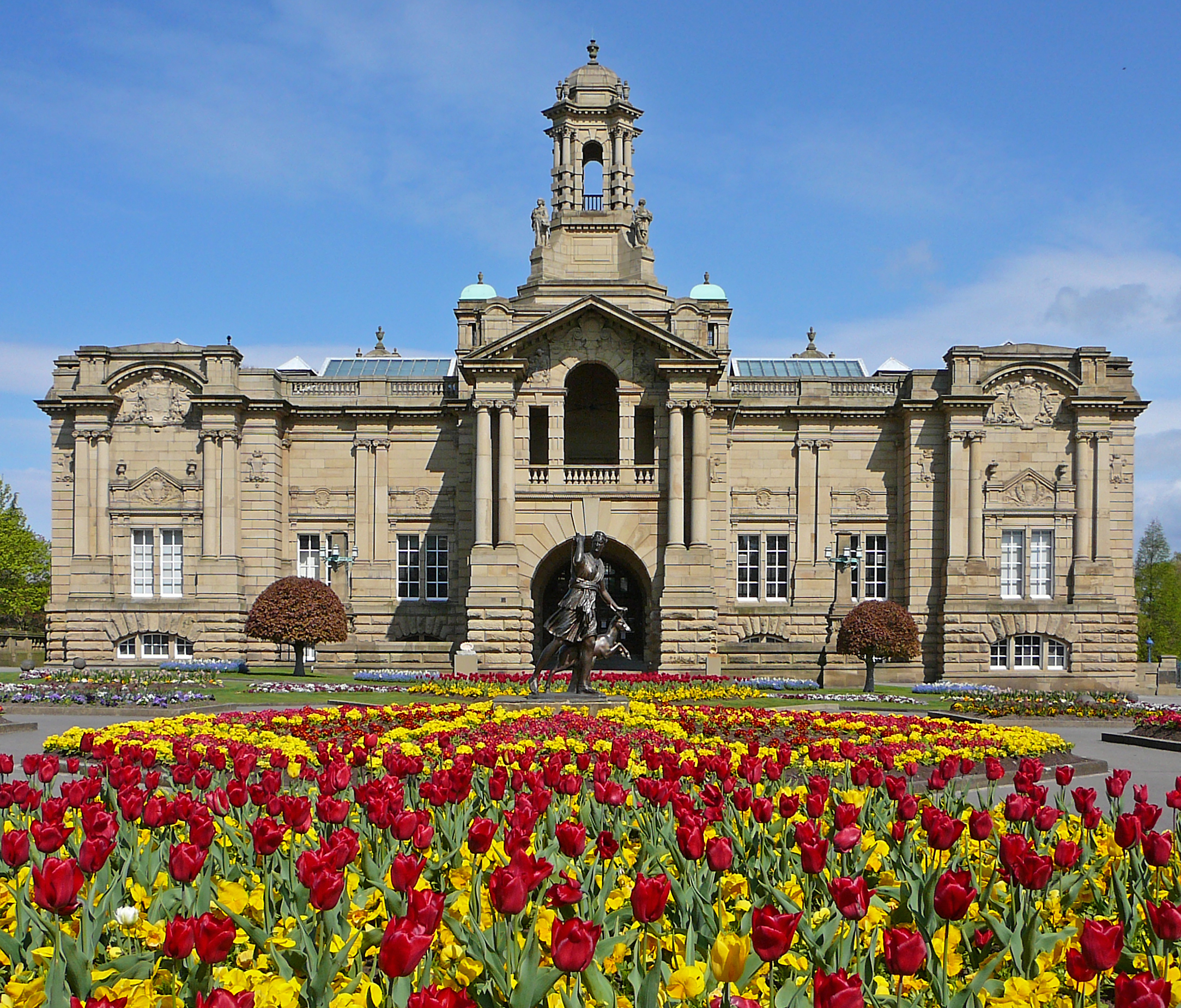
Cartwright Hall

Bradford is home to the acclaimed National Science and Media Museum (previously the National Museum of Photography, Film & Television), which celebrates cinema and movies, and is the most visited museum outside London. It contains the UK's first IMAX theatre, the Cubby Broccoli Cinema, and the Pictureville Cinema — described by David Puttnam as the best cinema in Britain.

Bradford Industrial Museum was established in 1974 at Moorside Mills, a spinning mill in Eccleshill. The museum celebrates and explains the significant achievements in Bradford's industrial past, from textiles and printing to the manufacture of motor cars.

A mile from the city centre is Bolling Hall Museum, a part medieval building that offers visitors a journey through the lives and times of the families that lived there for over five hundred years. Rooms are furnished and decorated to give a taste of life at different periods in the house's history.

Bradford's main art gallery is housed in Cartwright Hall in Lister Park. Bradford 1 Gallery is a city centre art gallery opened in October 2007 in a new building in Centenary Square. The gallery shows four temporary exhibitions a year.

The Bradford Museums & Galleries has a collection items relating to Herbert Morley (explorer) and Mitch the printmaker.

Impressions Gallery is an independent contemporary photography gallery with a temporary exhibitions programme showing on average six exhibitions each year. The gallery moved from York to Centenary Square, Bradford, in 2007.

=== City of Sanctuary ===
After a campaign in 2008, Bradford was recognised as a 'City of Sanctuary' on 18 November 2010. Bradford is "a place where a broad range of local organisations, community groups and faith communities, as well as local government, are publicly committed to welcoming and including people seeking sanctuary." The city has a history of welcoming newcomers from throughout the world. An example of this was when between December 1938 and September 1939 as part of the Kindertransport scheme, Bradford welcomed around 270 German Jewish refugee children. Many of these children were initially housed in a former hospital building on Shipley Glen, which had been converted into a temporary hostel. Later, the children were moved to private homes throughout Bradford and the surrounding areas. The purchase of the Carlton Hostel building in 1939, part of the same Kindertransport scheme, was made possible through donations from both Bradford's Jewish community and non-Jews.

=== Music ===
Bradford is the home town of rock bands New Model Army, Anti System, Smokie, Southern Death Cult, The Cult, Chantel McGregor, One Minute Silence, Scars on 45, Terrorvision, My Dying Bride and hip hop groups Fun-Da-Mental and Bad Boy Chiller Crew.

Singer-songwriters Tasmin Archer, Teddy Sinclair and Kiki Dee hail from the city.

Since the 1980s, Bradford has proved influential within the UK's punk rock scene, primarily because of the 1 in 12 Club, a music venue and anarchist workers' cooperative and members' club. 1980s groups such as Sore Throat, Anti System and late-era Doom all based themselves around the club, as did 1990s groups such as Voorhees and Ironside.

In 2002 Gareth Gates came second in the first series of Pop Idol and went on to achieve four UK number one singles before enjoying success in musical theatre. Kimberly Walsh achieved major success after winning a place in the girl band Girls Aloud in Popstars: The Rivals later in the same year, and in 2010 Zayn Malik came third in The X Factor with his boy band One Direction, who in March 2012 became the first British group to go straight to the top of the US music charts with their debut album.

The guitar player and composer Allan Holdsworth was born in Bradford in 1946.

=== Curry ===
In 2013 Bradford was again crowned "Curry Capital of Britain" after seeing off other strong contenders such as Glasgow and Wolverhampton. Bradford scored highly not just for the quality of food and service offered by each of the restaurants, but also for food hygiene, a deep understanding of the curry restaurant sector and its success in collectively raising funds for food charity The Curry Tree, which seeks to alleviate the plight of the poor in South East Asia. The judges were also particularly impressed by Bradford's International Food Academy and Jamie's Ministry of Food, which teaches the districts residents how to cook quick, simple, healthy and cost-effective meals. The city has been voted the curry capital of the UK for 6 years running.

== Sport ==
Bradford has a long sporting tradition, and Bradford Bulls, formerly Bradford Northern, is one of the most successful rugby league clubs in the world, winning the World Club Championship three times since 2002 and the Rugby Football League Championship seven times. Bradford Bulls play at the Grattan Stadium, Odsal, formerly Odsal Stadium. The city is also home to a number of rugby union clubs—Bradford Salem are based in the Heaton area and Wibsey RFC can be found to the south of the city centre. The Richard Dunn Sports Centre is close to the Odsal and the sports facilities at the university are also open to the public at certain times.

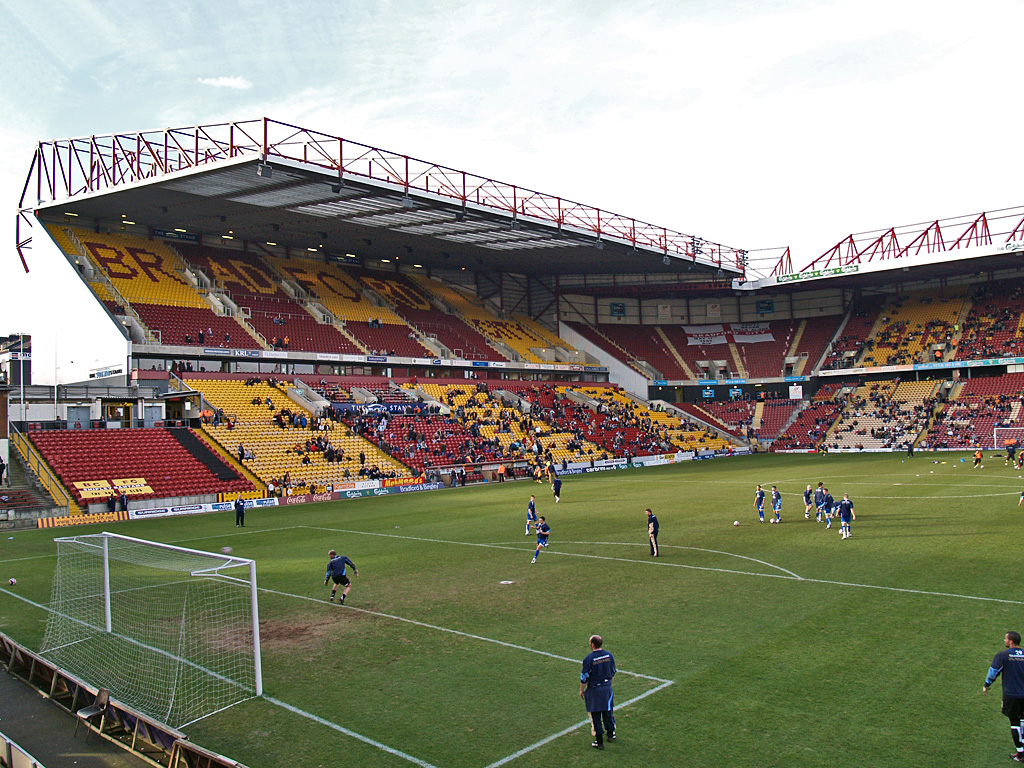
Bradford City's Valley Parade football stadium

Bradford City Football Club was formed in 1903. James Whyte, a sub-editor of the Bradford Observer, met with Football Association representative John Brunt in January to discuss plans, and in May Manningham RFC, a rugby league team, decided to change codes to association football. The Football League subsequently elected Bradford City to the league, with a total of 30 votes, to replace Doncaster Rovers, because it saw the invitation as a chance to introduce football to the rugby-dominated county. Eight years after the club was elected to the league, City won the FA Cup and recorded the highest league position in its history. They currently compete in EFL League One, the third tier of English football. The ground suffered one of the worst all-time sporting disasters after 56 people died at Valley Parade on 11 May 1985. A second club from the city, Bradford Park Avenue, played in the Football League until it dropped out in 1970, then went into liquidation in 1974. The club now plays in the Northern Premier League, in the seventh tier of English football, which means the Bradford derby has not been played in years. Bradford Park Avenue hosted county cricket for Yorkshire as well as football.

Bradford Hockey Club is a field hockey club that competes in the North Hockey League and the Yorkshire & North East Hockey League.

Odsal Stadium is also the home of regular national BriSCA Formula 1 Stock Cars and BriSCA Formula 2 Stock Cars race meetings. The venue has hosted stock car and banger racing in the multi-use stadium since 23 June 1945, however the end of speedway racing in 1997 brought stock car racing in Bradford to a temporary close when the shale track was removed. The sport was revived at Odsal in 2021 with a brand new track surface, and is managed by Yorstox who also host meetings at Owlerton Stadium in Sheffield.

The defunct Bradford Dukes speedway team raced at Odsal until 1997. Speedway was staged at Greenfields Stadium in the pioneer days, when it was known as the Autodrome in the early 1960s. Odsal opened its doors in 1945 and continued in the late 1950s. It entered a team in the 1960 Provincial League then fell dormant until the 1970s when it re-opened. The track staged a Speedway World Final. The speedway team rode under a number of names—probably the longest running was Bradford Northern—in common with the Rugby League team. This was changed to Bradford Barons, emulating the more successful Halifax Dukes. Eventually the Halifax team was brought to Bradford under the name Bradford Dukes, who raced mostly on shale surfaces until 1997, when motorsports temporarily ceased at Odsal.

The Bradford Dragons are the city's basketball team, competing in the second tier English Basketball League Division 1. The team play their home games at Bradford College.

The city also has a history of skateboarding culture; in Ian Glasper's 2012 book Armed with Anger, the city was described as "West Yorkshire's de facto skate capital".

Joe Johnson, a retired professional snooker player from Bradford, won the 1986 World Snooker Championship.

Jasmin Atker is a Bradford student who captained the first England team in the international Street Child Cricket World Cup, and was named one of the BBC 100 top inspiring women in 2019.

== Public services ==
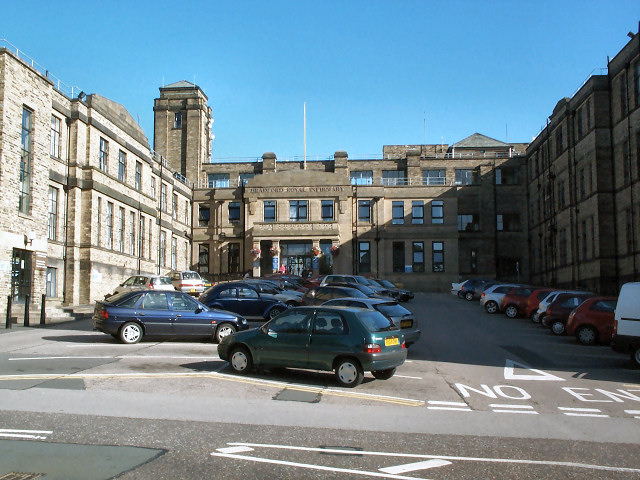
Bradford Royal Infirmary

There are two major hospitals in Bradford: Bradford Royal Infirmary and St Luke's Hospital. Both are teaching hospitals and are operated by Bradford Teaching Hospitals NHS trust. Over the years the Trust has subsumed a number of smaller hospitals; these include Woodlands Orthopaedic Hospital, Northern View and Bierley Hall.

Bradford is the focus of one of the UK's largest ever birth cohort studies, known as Born in Bradford. Partly supported by European funding, it is the result of close collaboration between the University of Bradford, the NHS and other institutions in West Yorkshire. It will track the lives of all the babies born in the city from 2006 to 2008 and aims to provide a wealth of data, allowing health researchers the opportunity to investigate many different aspects of health and wellbeing.

== Crime ==
Bradford has been the scene of some high-profile crimes such as the 2005 shooting of Bradford PC Sharon Beshenivsky while responding to a burglary in the city. In May 2010, Stephen Griffiths was charged with the Bradford murders.

The Manningham Riot in June 1995, in Manningham and the 2001 Bradford race riots in July 2001 as a result of tension between ethnic minority communities and the city's white majority, stoked by the Anti-Nazi League and the National Front. There were 297 arrests, 187 people charged with riot, and 45 charged with violent disorder, leading to 200 jail sentences totalling 604 years.

During the 2020s, Bradford was among several cities across the United Kingdom affected by vandalism and protests linked to pro-Palestinian activism, including actions attributed to Palestine Action. Several locations in the Bradford area were targeted and damaged, including a Barclays branch and the Teledyne Defence and Space factory in Shipley, where approximately £571,000 in damage was caused. Some pro-Palestinian activists were subsequently convicted of criminal damage at Bradford Court in 2026.

== Bradfordians ==
Only a few particularly notable names are listed here.

Sir William Rothenstein photo by George Charles Beresford, 1902

Among Bradford born people who made significant contributions to the arts were David Hockney, painter, draughtsman, printmaker, stage designer and photographer, who was born in the city and educated at Bradford Grammar School. Frederick Delius (1862–1934) was a composer born to a family of German descent in the city and J.B. Priestley (1894–1984) was a novelist and playwright. Sir William Rothenstein was a painter, draughtsman and writer on art who was principal of the Royal College of Art from 1920 to 1935.

In the field of classical music Rodney Friend is an English violinist, born (1940), in 1964 he became the youngest ever leader of the London Philharmonic Orchestra. In the field of science and medicine, Friederich Wilhelm Eurich (1867–1945), professor of forensic medicine and bacteriologist, did much to conquer anthrax in the wool trade.

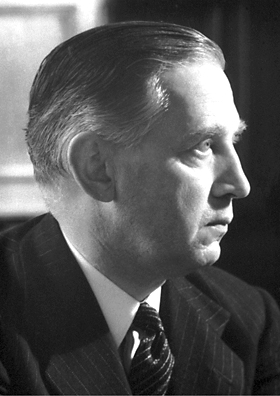
Sir Edward Appleton

Sir Edward Appleton (1892–1965), discoverer of the ionosphere was a Nobel Prize winner. Robert Turner (1923–1990) was a pathologist who came to Bradford from Belfast, and pioneered the use of chemotherapy in the treatment of cancer at the Bradford Royal Infirmary.

In the field of industry, Sir Jacob Behrens (1806–1889) was an Anglo–German textile merchant who was instrumental in Bradford becoming a major exporter of woollen goods.

A social reformer who campaigned against child labour, Richard Oastler (1789–1861), is commemorated by a statue in Northgate and the Oastler Shopping Centre located close to the Kirkgate Shopping Centre W.E. Forster (1818–1886), was MP for Bradford and, commemorated by statue, is the namesake of Forster Square.

In recent pop culture the former participant of The X Factor, Zayn Malik, former member of successful boy band One Direction, was born and raised in Bradford. American film star Aasif Mandvi grew up in Bradford.

== In popular culture ==
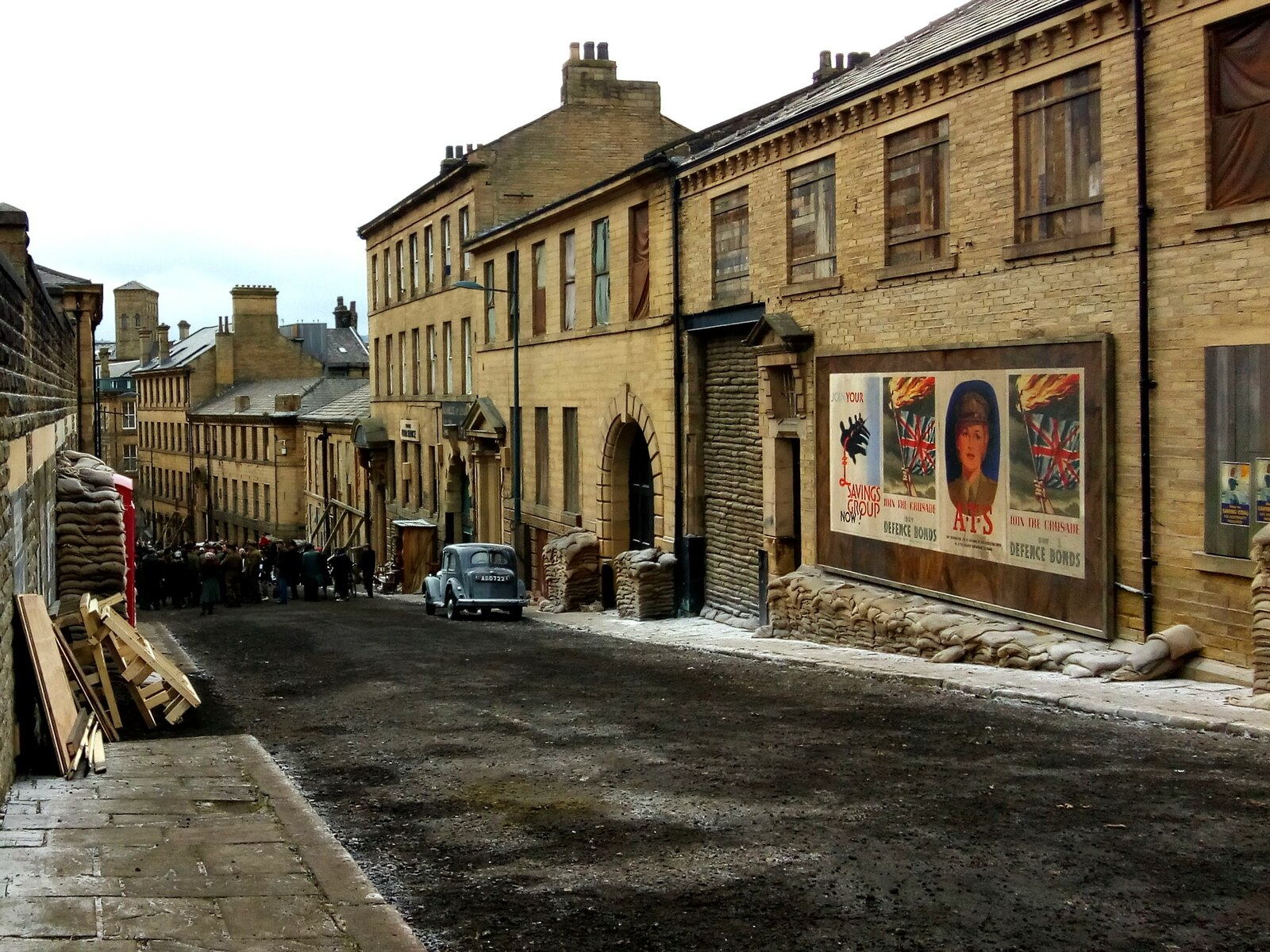
Burnett Street in Little Germany dressed to look like Birmingham in the Second World War for filming the war drama Six Triple Eight

The city has a rich heritage in film production, and many films and TV productions have been filmed in the city. Films using Bradford as a location include Room at the Top (1959); Billy Liar (1963); The Railway Children (1970), a children's film shot around Haworth including the Bronte Parsonage; Yanks (1979), starring Richard Gere; Monty Python's The Meaning of Life (1983), with footage filmed in Lister Park; FairyTale: A True Story (1997) starring Harvey Keitel, based on the story of the Cottingley Fairies; and East is East (1997), in which Oak Lane is shown when the family visit the city.

The Buttershaw area of the city is featured in the film Rita, Sue and Bob Too (1987), in which two 16-year-old girls are involved in a love triangle with a wealthy married man (played by George Costigan). The film, created by local Andrea Dunbar, was initially unpopular with local residents due to its negative image of the area, but has since earned itself a good reputation in the local community as Buttershaw's claim to fame. The award-winning 2013 film The Selfish Giant takes place in and around Bradford.

In the BBC political satire The Amazing Mrs Pritchard (2006), the Prime Minister considers a proposal to move Parliament to Bradford, as it is closer to the geographic centre of the country than London. The 2008 Spooks spin-off for BBC Three, Spooks: Code 9, was filmed in the city, as were the television adaptation of the Red Riding works by David Peace first broadcast in 2009. Bradford was the focus of a 2012 Channel 4 documentary, Make Bradford British, which examined the level of integration between the city's Christian and Muslim communities.

Series 2 of The Syndicate, which aired in 2013 on BBC One, featured a syndicate involving workers at a public hospital in Bradford. Scenes for the second season of All Creatures Great and Small were filmed in Little Germany in April 2021, featuring child and adult actors from the theatre school Articulate. In recent years, Bradford was the filming location for popular TV shows including Peaky Blinders, Happy Valley and The Crown. Filming sites included Bradford City Hall, Leeds-Liverpool Canal and Little Germany.

Bradford features under the name of "Broadbeck" in the best-selling 1912 novel Windyridge by Bradford novelist Willie Riley. Link, the main character of the 1993 novel Stone Cold, by Robert E. Swindells, is from Bradford.

== International relations ==
Bradford is twinned with a number of places around the world:

- Skopje, North Macedonia (since 1963)
- Roubaix, France (since 1969)
- Verviers, Belgium (since 1970)
- Mönchengladbach, Germany (since 1971)
- Galway, Ireland (since 1987)
- Mirpur, Azad Kashmir, Pakistan (friendship agreement in 1998)
- Varna, Bulgaria (since 1992)

== See also ==
- Bredevoort
- List of Pals battalions
- Listed buildings in Bradford
