= Listed buildings in Bradford =

The listed buildings in Bradford are arranged by civil parishes and wards as follows:

- Listed buildings in Bradford (Bolton and Undercliffe Ward)
- Listed buildings in Bradford (Bowling and Barkerend Ward)
- Listed buildings in Bradford (Bradford Moor Ward)
- Listed buildings in Bradford (City Ward)
- Listed buildings in Bradford (Eccleshill Ward)
- Listed buildings in Bradford (Great Horton Ward)
- Listed buildings in Bradford (Heaton Ward)
- Listed buildings in Bradford (Little Horton Ward)
- Listed buildings in Bradford (Manningham Ward)
- Listed buildings in Bradford (Royds Ward)
- Listed buildings in Bradford (Toller Ward)
- Listed buildings in Bradford (Tong Ward)
- Listed buildings in Bradford (Trident Parish)
- Listed buildings in Bradford (Wibsey Ward)
