= Manningham, Bradford =

Area of Bradford, West Yorkshire, England

Coordinates: 53.805°N 1.764°W

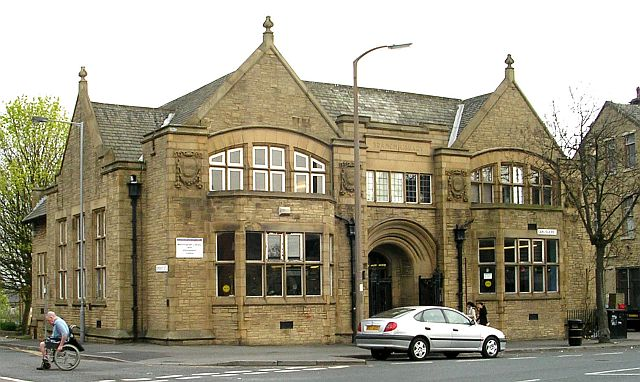
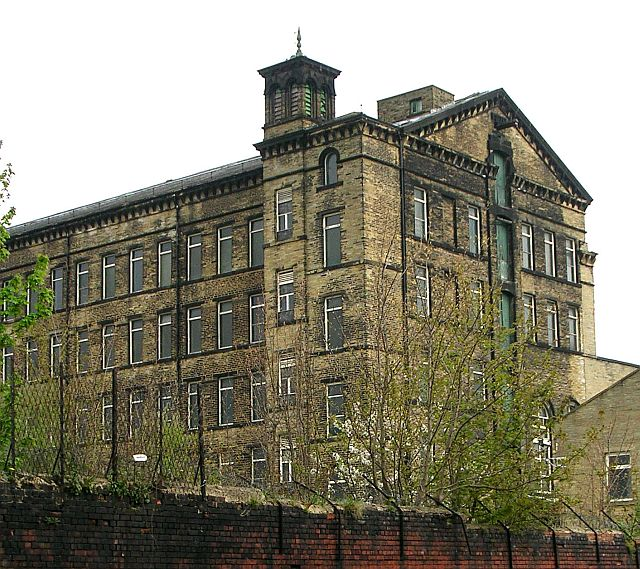
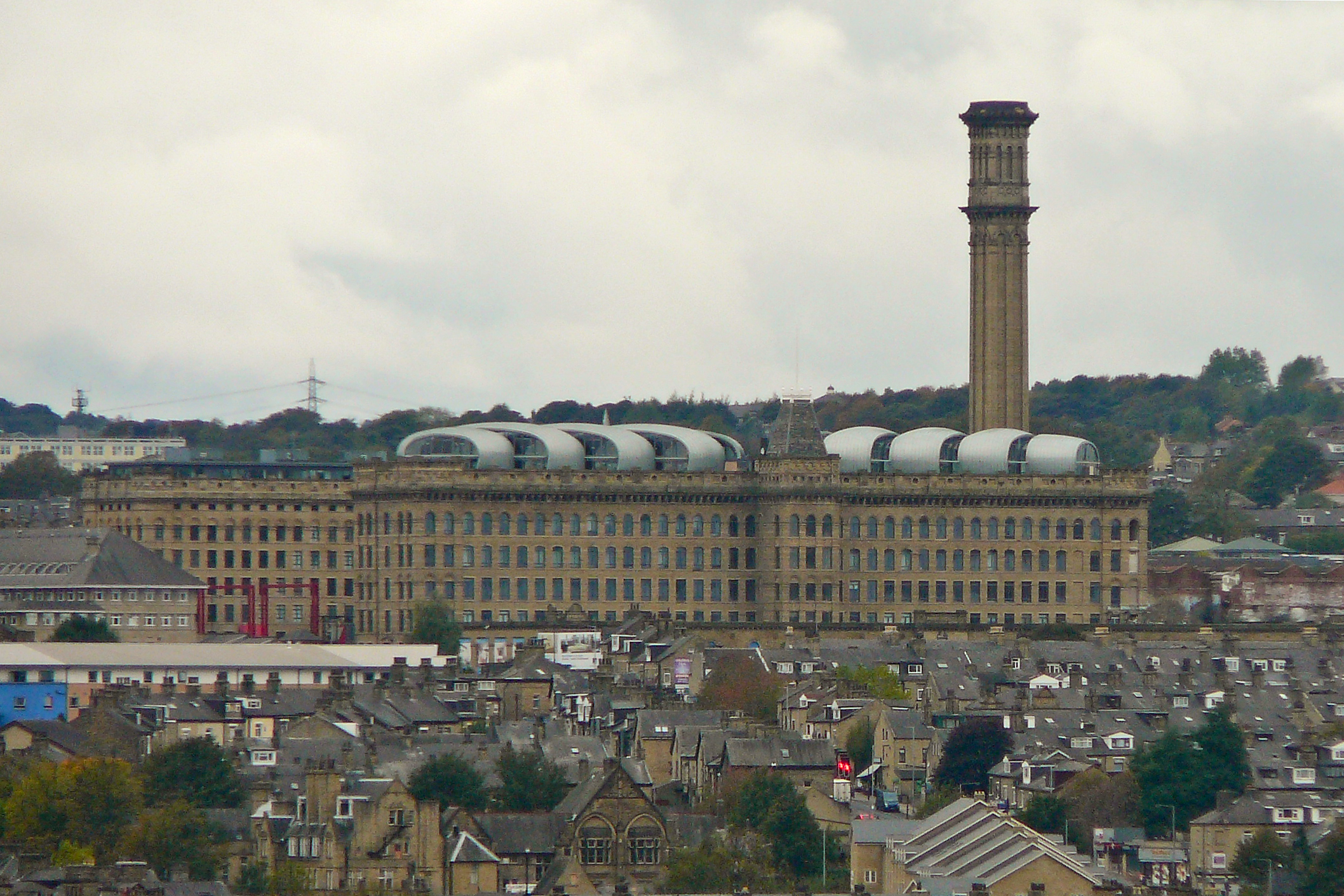
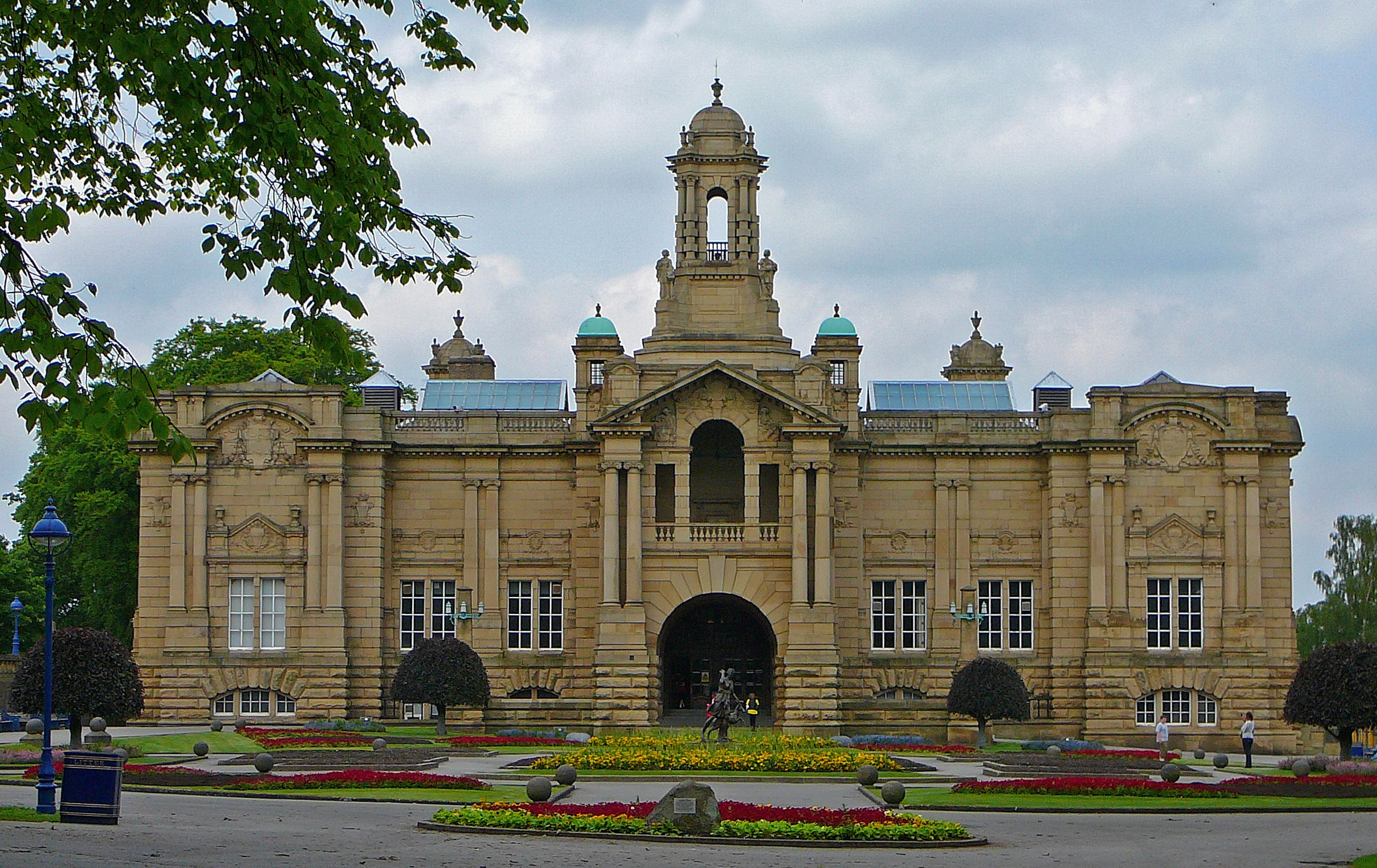
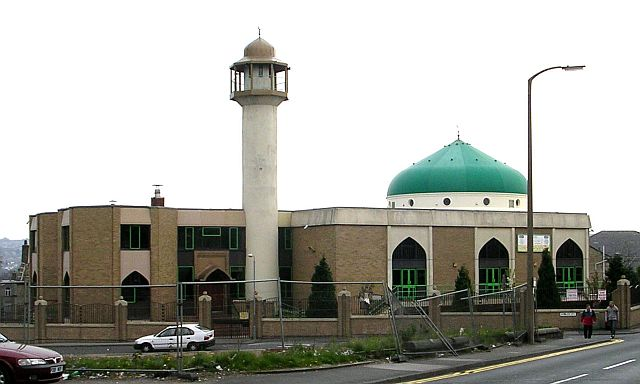
- The Library Drummond Mill Manningham Mills Cartwright Hall Jamia Masjid

- Location within West Yorkshire
- Metropolitan borough: City of Bradford
- Metropolitan county: West Yorkshire
- Region: Yorkshire and the Humber
- Country: England
- Sovereign state: United Kingdom
- Post town: BRADFORD
- Postcode district: BD8
- Dialling code: 01274
- Police: West Yorkshire
- Fire: West Yorkshire
- Ambulance: Yorkshire
- UK Parliament: Bradford West
- Councillors: Shabir Hussain (Labour); Sameena Akhtar (Labour); Sarfraz Nazir (Labour)

Manningham is a historically industrial workers' area as well as a council ward of Bradford, West Yorkshire, England. The population of the 2011 Census for the Manningham Ward was 19,983.

== History ==
The name Manningham probably derives from the Old English Maegeninghām meaning 'village connected with Maegen'.

Manningham holds a wealth of industrial history, including mill buildings, imposing wool merchants' houses and back-to-back terraced houses. It is the old Jewish area of Bradford. Many of Manningham's German community later migrated to the Heaton area of the city.

=== Cinema history ===
In 1912 the Manningham Kinematograph Company Ltd opened the 519 seat Oak Lane Picture House on a site on the north side of Oak Lane between St Mary's Road and Sunderland Road. The cinema was a converted horse tramshed of the Bradford Tramways and Omnibus Co Ltd. The name was changed to Oriental in 1920 and by 1931 Western Electric sound had been installed. The building closed in 1936 for a partial rebuild involving a new roof, balcony, and an enlarged screen, and the cinema reopened in 1937. A Hammond organ was subsequently installed but was removed at the start of the Second World War. In 1955 a CinemaScope screen was installed with stereophonic sound, but the cinema closed in 1958. The building was subsequently demolished and a mini-supermarket built on the site.

The purpose-built 1,250 seat Marlboro Cinema was located at the junction of Carlisle Road and Carlisle Street and opened in 1921. The building was designed by architect T Patrick and is built of red brick with a white tiled entrance and domed tower. It was owned by Moulson's Marlboro Cinema Company headed by Milton Moulson. Sound films were shown by 1930, and the number of seats was reduced to 1227 in 1944. Walter Eckert's Star Cinemas (London) Ltd acquired the cinema in 1950 and installed Western Electric sound. It had a panoramic screen from 1954, but stereo sound was never installed. Bingo was introduced on a part-time basis but the cinema closed fully in 1962 with bingo continuing full-time until 1968. From 1962 to 1982 it was known as the Liberty Cinema showing Asian films for the growing local South Asian population. After closure and removal of the raked floor and balcony the building became a bedding and textile warehouse. After a major refurbishment by Asian Cine Ltd in 2000, the cinema - now reduced to 400 seats - showed Bollywood films. In 2001 a blaze wrecked the cinema, and its fire-damaged part was rebuilt as an Asian Marriage Hall and function room.

The former Manningham Methodist Church off Carlisle Road was converted into the Sangeet Cinema opening in 1970 which showed Asian films. The former church building was very large and also housed numerous Asian businesses. The Naz was a smaller cinema created at the rear of the building which was only used occasionally. The Sangeet closed in 1980, and a series of fires struck the building in the 1980s, after which the whole building was demolished.

=== Deprivation ===
Manningham was the location of the Manningham riot (June 1995) and the Bradford Riots (July 2001). In April 1994, The Independent newspaper reported that unemployment in Manningham stood at 40% (around four times the national average at the time), and that a large number of known drug users and alcoholics lived there.

== Geography ==
The area usually termed "Manningham" tends to be that bordered by Manningham Lane to the east, Thornton Road (B6145) to the south-west, and Oak Lane to the north.

However, this is historically inaccurate as it also encompasses places such as White Abbey, Black Abbey, or Longlands in addition to the historic Manningham. The use of those place names has persisted with the creation of administrative units such as the Manningham Ward.

=== Streets ===
Manningham Lane, part of the A650, stretches from Hamm Strasse to Lister Park (also known as Manningham Park) where it becomes Keighley Road. It is a busy road in terms of both traffic and commerce, lined with shops and businesses for practically its entire length.

White Abbey Road - which becomes Whetley Hill at the junction with Whetley Lane and Carlisle Road - part of the B6144, is similarly active, with several large clothing outlets and jewellery shops.

Lumb Lane, running parallel to and between Manningham Lane and White Abbey Road, is the home to many independent shops, mainly catering to the local South Asian community. There are also several pubs and South Asian restaurants.

Recent actions by the Bradford Council and local community groups have helped in starting to improve the area.

=== Districts ===
==== White Abbey ====
White Abbey is a historic district on the north-western edge of Bradford city centre. Its boundaries are roughly the equivalent of White Abbey Road to the west and south, Lumb Lane to the east and Carlisle Road to the north. The name "White Abbey" probably refers to the use of this area as a grange farmed by Cistercian monks and brothers, most likely from Kirkstall Abbey in Leeds: there is no indication that this area had an abbey of its own. Like many of the older districts of inner-city Bradford, White Abbey was once a vibrant and highly populated neighbourhood. Today the area is dominated by social housing.

== Demography ==
Manningham has a large British Pakistani population, which has increased since the 1960s. Looking at electoral register data in 1964, around 6.7% of Manningham was Pakistani/Indian. In 1971, 24.8% of Manningham was Asian Pakistani. In 2024, the proportion of residents identifying as Pakistani in Manningham had increased to 62.4%, compared to 25% in Bradford citywide.

== Landmarks ==
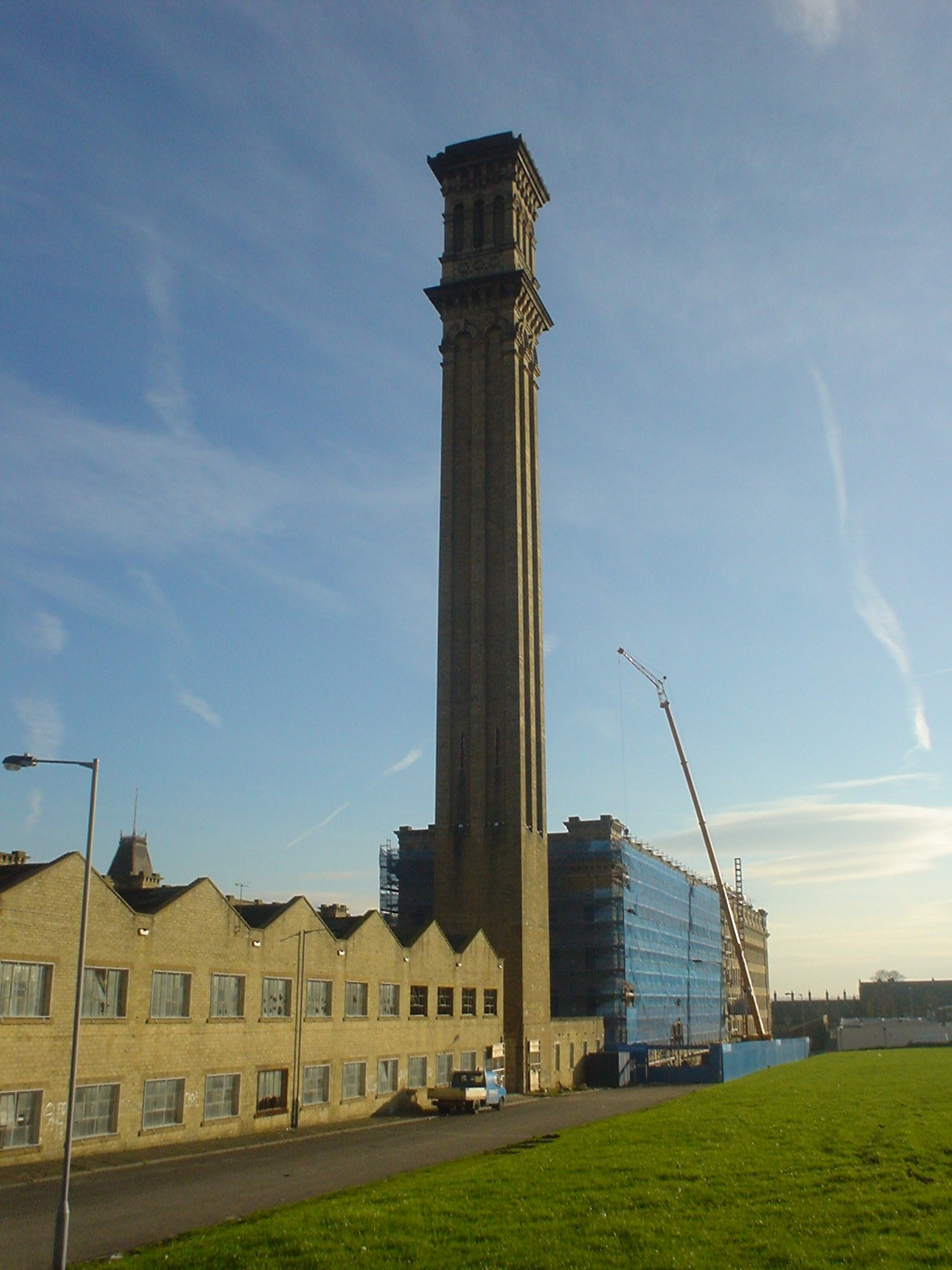
Lister Mills

The dominant landmark for the entire city is Lister Mills. The mills stand on the most elevated part of Manningham, at the top of Oak Lane (more accurately, on the corner of Lilycroft and Heaton Roads).

The mills have been converted into luxury modern flats. Another former prominent textile factory, Drummond Mill, was destroyed in a fire in January 2018 and has largely been demolished. Bradford Reform Synagogue is situated in Manningham and is a Grade II listed Moorish Revival building. Architecturally, this is a very rare and well-preserved, small scale, provincial synagogue built in "Oriental" style. It is considered a significant example in British synagogue architecture of the 19th century fashion for "Orientalism". The Bradford Reform Synagogue is the oldest Reform Synagogue in the UK outside London.

Another key landmark is Lister Park. This triangular park, situated between Keighley Road, North Park Road and Emm Lane in the north of Manningham, is one of the city's largest parks. It houses Cartwright Hall (a museum and art gallery), a large boating lake and the Mughal Water Gardens as well as extensive botanical gardens.

Bradford Grammar School is situated at the northern edge of Manningham between Lister Park and Canal Road, bordering Frizinghall. The school was founded in 1548 and granted its Charter by King Charles II in 1662. It has occupied its current location since after World War II.

== Governance ==
Councillors

Manningham electoral ward is represented on Bradford Council by three Labour Party councillors, Shabir Hussain, Sameena Akhtar and Sarfraz Nazir.

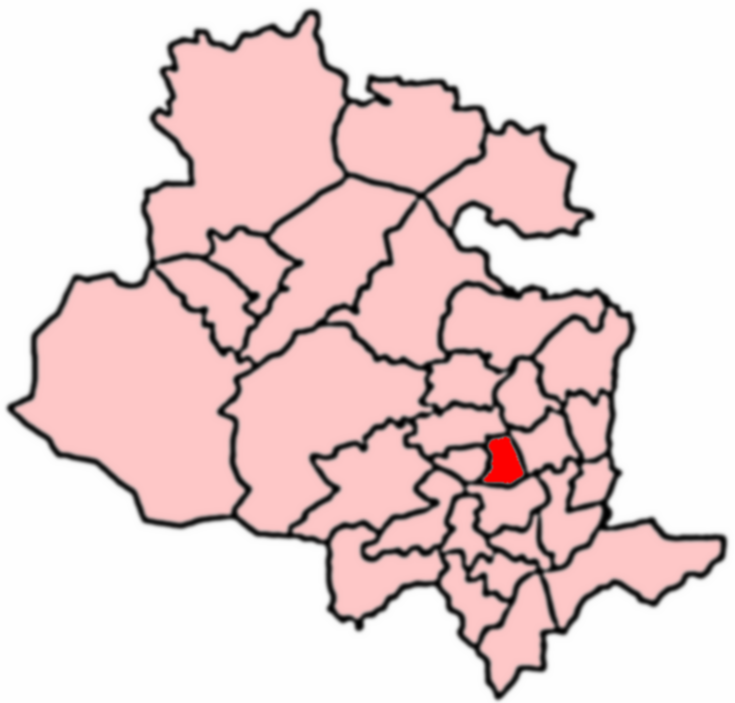
2004 Boundaries of Manningham Ward.

Election	Councillor	Councillor	Councillor
2004	Reis Khan (Con)	Choudhary Rangzeb (Lab)	Mohammed Ishrat Mirza (Lib Dem)
2006	Shabir Hussain (Lab)	Choudhary Rangzeb (Lab)	Mohammed Mirza (Lib Dem)
2007	Shabir Hussain (Lab)	Quasim Khan (Lib Dem)	Mohammed Mirza (Lib Dem)
2008	Shabir Hussain (Lab)	Quasim Khan (Lib Dem)	Mohammad Amin (Lab)
2010	Shabir Hussain (Lab)	Quasim Khan (Lib Dem)	Mohammad Amin (Lab)
2011	Shabir Hussain (Lab)	Javed Asama (Lab)	Mohammad Amin (Lab)
2012	Shabir Hussain (Lab)	Javed Asama (Lab)	Ishtiaq Ahmed (Respect)
October 2013	Shabir Hussain (Lab)	Javed Asama (Lab)	Ishtiaq Ahmed (Ind)
2014	Shabir Hussain (Lab)	Javed Asama (Lab)	Ishtiaq Ahmed (Ind)
March 2015	Shabir Hussain (Lab)	Javed Asama (Respect)	Ishtiaq Ahmed (Respect)
May 2015	Shabir Hussain (Lab)	Sameena Akhtar (Lab)	Ishtiaq Ahmed (Respect)
2016	Shabir Hussain (Lab)	Sameena Akhtar (Lab)	Sarfraz Nazir (Lab)

indicates seat up for re-election. indicates councillor defection.

Manningham was formerly a township in the parish of Bradford, in 1866 Manningham became a separate civil parish, on 25 March 1898 the parish was abolished and merged with Bradford. In 1891 the parish had a population of 45,051.

== Sport ==
Manningham is also the location of Valley Parade football stadium, which has been the home of Bradford City football club since they were founded in 1903 and where Bradford RLFC played in recent years while Odsal Stadium was redeveloped. In 1985 the Valley Parade ground was the site of a fire which killed 56 spectators and injured at least 265 at the final game of the season against Lincoln City. The incident led to improved safety regulations at British sports grounds.

As was once common with English football stadiums, the stadium takes its name from the road on which it is situated, Valley Parade being the name of a road that slopes down the valley off the A650 towards Bradford Beck.

== Notable people ==
Gertie Millar, Countess of Dudley, the music hall actress, was born in Manningham, as was J. B. Priestley. The Australian women's rights activist Erna Laura Keighley was born here in 1891.

Former pupils of Bradford Grammar School include Denis Healey, Sir Ken Morrison, David Hockney and David Miliband.

== See also ==
- Listed buildings in Bradford (Manningham Ward)
- Belle Vue
