= Lister Park =

Public park in Bradford, West Yorkshire, England

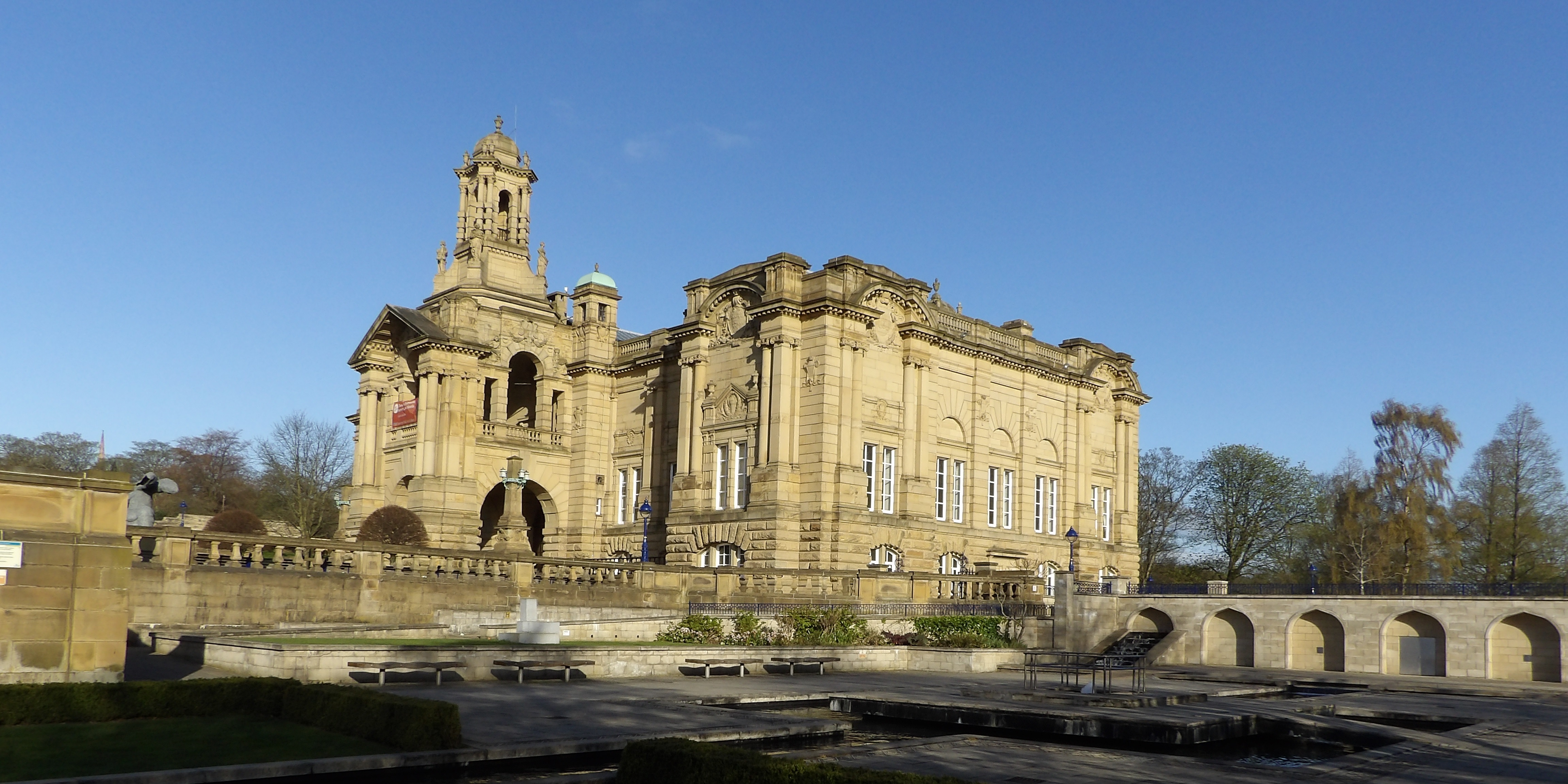
- Cartwright Hall is the centrepiece of the park.
- Interactive map of Lister Park
- Location: Bradford, West Yorkshire
- Coordinates: 53°48′47.48″N 1°46′19.67″W
- Area: 22.25 hectares (55.0 acres)
- Created: 1870
- Operator: Bradford Parks Service
- Status: Open all year

Lister Park (also known as Manningham Park) is a picturesque public park in Bradford, West Yorkshire, England, between Manningham, Heaton and Frizinghall. It has won various national awards. It is situated about a mile outside the city centre on Manningham Lane, the main road between Bradford and Shipley. Lister Park contains the Cartwright Hall art gallery, where permanent and temporary exhibitions of modern and traditional art can be seen.

== History ==
One of the city's largest parks, the land was purchased by the City of Bradford for half its commercial value from Samuel Cunliffe Lister, who built Lister's Mill. Bradford's Great Exhibition of 1904 was held in the park. A Somali community of 57 men, women and children took part in the exhibition as a "living" colonial display. An exhibition in Cartwright Hall during 2026 recalled their participation in the exhibition and explored the ethical issues involved in offering such a display and interpreting it a century later.

An open air swimming pool, the Lister Park Lido, was added to the park in 1915. Although it was very popular in its early years, by the 1930s the public were losing interest in the facility which no longer met the standards of hygiene they expected. In response to proposals made by the baths committee, the council carried out a modernisation scheme in 1937 which involved the installation of a filtration, sterilisation and heating plant. A cafe was also added. The Lido was reopened in May 1939. Popularity of the Lido waned over time and by 1982 repairs to the value of £60,000 were needed. The Lido closed in 1983 and was demolished in 1991.

The park's original botanical garden was built by the Calverley antiquarian Samuel Margerison, who had a flair for garden design.

The park has been successfully renovated in recent years. It was voted Britain's Best Park for 2006, and nominated for the Best Park In Europe 2006.

== Facilities ==
The lake has been re-opened for boats and a traditional South Asian Mughal Water Garden constructed. There are also tennis and basketball courts, bowling greens and a children's playground. Bradford parkrun, a free, weekly, 5 km run, hosted by local volunteers, is held in the park at 9 am every Saturday.

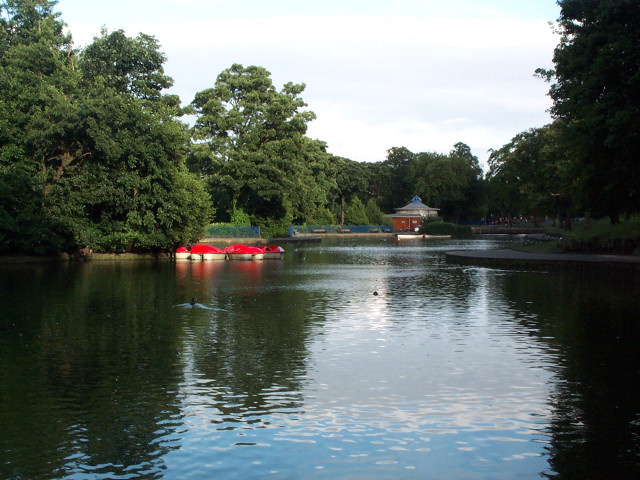
Boating lake in the park.

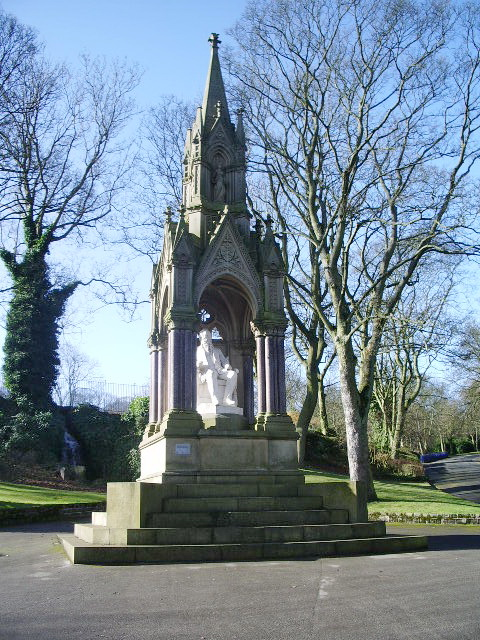
Statue of Titus Salt, moved to the park from the town hall in 1896.

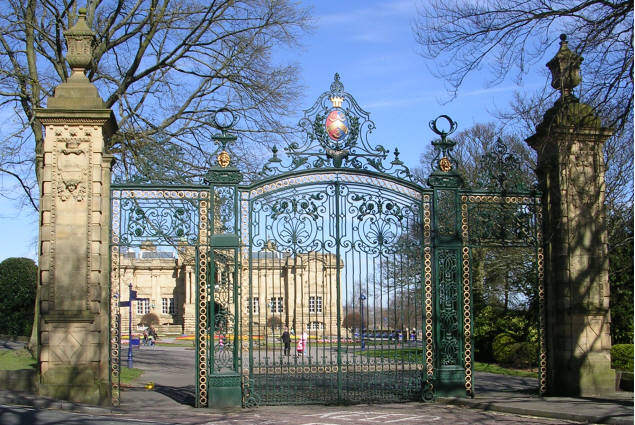
Prince of Wales gates, erected 1904.

== See also ==
- Listed buildings in Bradford (Heaton Ward)
- Listed buildings in Bradford (Manningham Ward)
