= Northcliffe Park =

Park in Shipley, United Kingdom

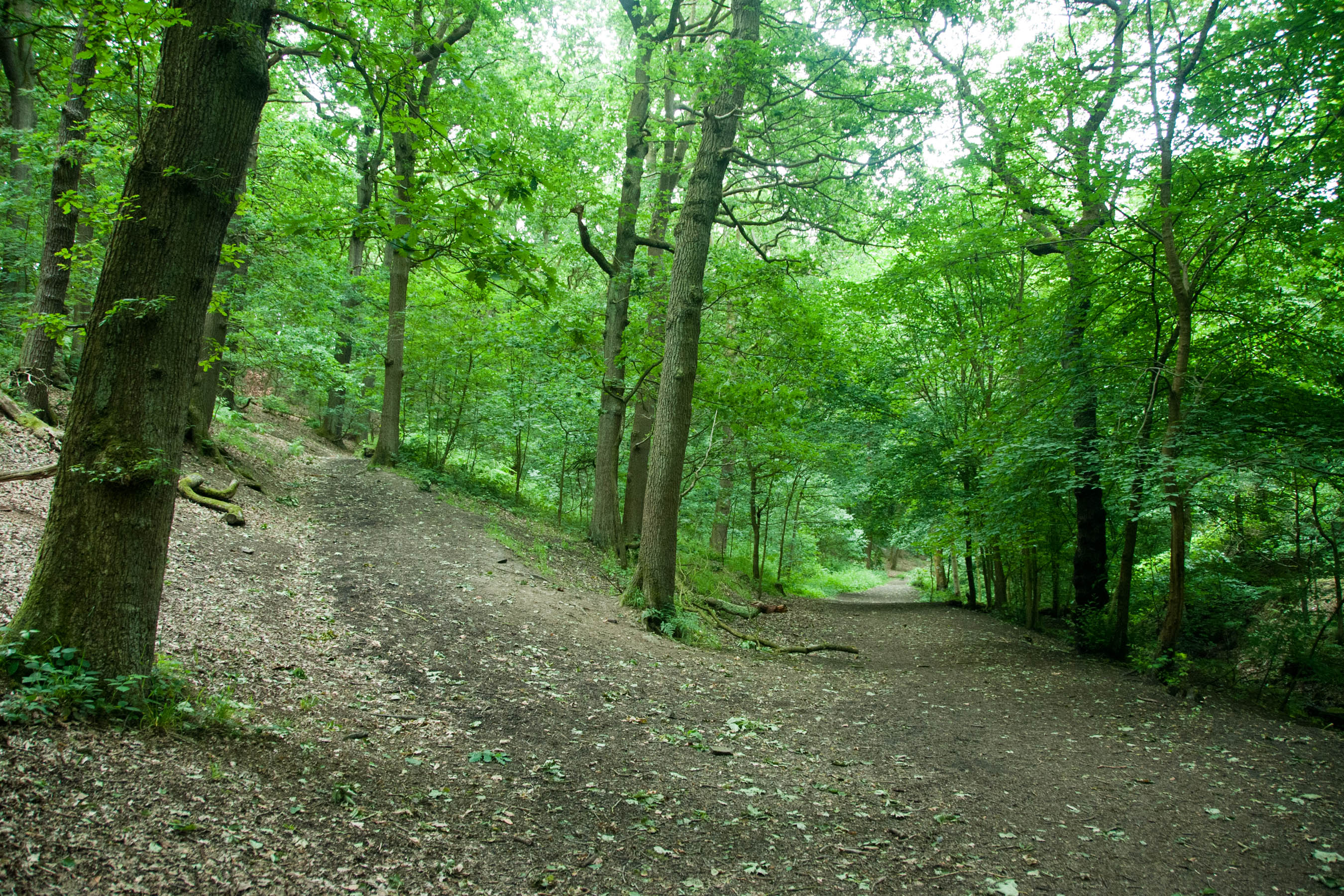
- The woods in Northcliffe Park Shipley
- Interactive map of Northcliffe Park
- Location: Shipley, West Yorkshire
- Nearest city: Bradford
- OS grid: SE139159
- Coordinates: 53°49′35.7″N 1°47′23.6″W
- Area: 35 hectares (86 acres)
- Opened: June 1920
- Founder: Sir Norman Rae
- Owner: Bradford City Council
- Open: 24 hours, 365 days per year

Northcliffe Park is a 35-hectare (86-acre) area in Shipley, West Yorkshire, England, set aside for allotments, parkland and woodland. The park and playing fields were donated by Sir Norman Rae in 1920 and the playing fields are known as the Norman Rae fields, but are part of the park itself. The park adjoins the town of Shipley to its eastern and northern sides, and Heaton to the south, with Northcliffe Golf Club also bordering the park on the western side. Bradford Model Engineering Society have two demonstration and ride-on lines within the park which are open to public in the summer.

The area was historically known as North Clough ('clough' referring to the ravine containing Northcliffe Dike stream), and then North Cliff which over time became Northcliffe.

== History ==
The site was used to mine coal and quarry sandstone and fireclay from the 17th to early 20th centuries. Research has uncovered more than 40 coal shafts and at least ten quarry sites. The 35-hectare (86-acre) was donated in June 1920 by Sir Norman Rae. The area was due to be sold during 1919 and a remark by Rae to a colleague about how it would benefit the people of shipley, prompted Rae to follow his own advice and after the sale at auction fell through, he purchased the land and had it adapted into a park, though the current main entrance to the playing fields opposite the "Branch Junction" in Shipley, did not open until 1929. The area was historically written as North Clough which during the 19th and 20th centuries became first Northcliff and then Northcliffe. Written records for deciding the space and borders of the allotments lists the site as being North Cliff Woods. Care and maintenance of the park was the remit of Shipley Urban District Council which was absorbed into Bradford Council in 1974. In 2025, Northcliffe Park alongside others within the Bradford District, were designated as local nature reserves.

The park consists of the woodland, parkland, allotments and the Sir Norman Rae playing fields. The playing fields were previously the site of the nine-hole Shipley Golf Course which had been on the site since 1897. The 18-hole Northcliffe Golf Club now straddles the north and western edges of the park, though some evidence of the previous golf course on the playing fields can be seen. Bowling, tennis and cricket are available to play in the park with the addition of a fenced-in play area for children. During the Second World War, crops were grown in the park by Land Army girls for the war effort.

A small stream known as Northcliffe Dike cuts through the southern part of the park (known as Northclife Woods) and joins up with Red Beck (from Heaton Woods) before flowing into Bradford Beck between Frizinghall and Shipley. The Friends of Northcliffe Woods carried out remediation on the beck and its ponds in 2010 and 2011.

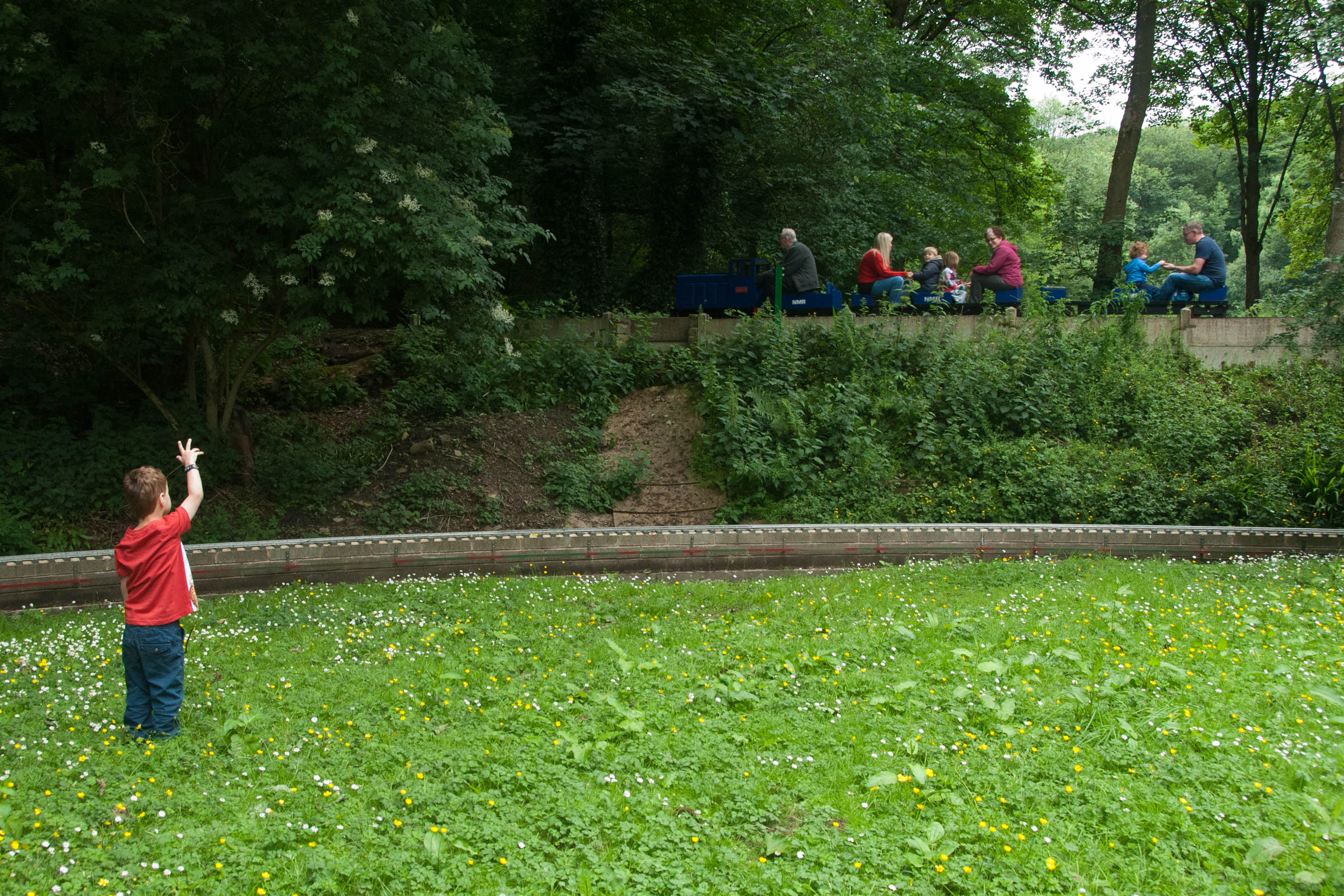
The engine is on the upper line in Northcliffe Woods, Shipley, West Yorkshire. The shorter raised loop is in the foreground.

Bradford Council have actively let a wildflower meadow grow in the woods. Previously, the grass was kept short, but since 2010 has been allowed to grow with only small footpaths cut through it. This has helped ghost moths to proliferate and this was highlighted on the BBC One programme, The One Show. Two Ancient Semi Natural Woodlands (ASNW) exist within the park; Old Spring Wood is to the northern end of the park and Northcliffe Woods are the southern end of the park with Northcliffe Dike running through them and a stone incised with cup and ring marks.

The Norman Rae Gala is held annually in the park in either June or July. The event has many rides, stalls and artists performing in the fields and also in the woodland.

Bradford Model Engineering Society operate two railway tracks in the woodland area of the park. The gauges vary between 3.25 inches (83 mm) and 5 inches (130 mm) on a raised oval track that runs for 440 feet (130 m) and a larger loop that runs on the ground for 2,000 feet (610 m) and takes trains of 5-inch (130 mm) and 7.25-inch (184 mm) gauges. The society is one of the oldest model engineering societies in Britain (founded in 1908) and operates the railways in summer for passengers weather permitting. The society refer to, and label their railway, as Northcliff Railway using one of the older spellings of the name.
