= Norman Rae =

British politician (1860–1928)

Sir Henry Norman Rae (20 January 1860 – 31 December 1928) was an English wool merchant and Liberal Party politician.

== Family and education ==
Rae was the son of a Congregational Minister, the Reverend James Rae from Harrogate in North Yorkshire. He was educated at Batley Grammar School and later attended Silcoates, a Congregationalist School near Wakefield where his father was a school governor and also spent some time at a boarding school, Highbury House at St Leonards-on-Sea. In 1883 he married Emily Cass from Mirfield. His wife died in 1927. They had one son and one daughter.

== Career ==
Rae went into the wool business and set up as a merchant in that trade at Harrogate. He was the principal in the firm of Pickles and Rae, wool combers and top makers in Bradford.

== Politics ==
From 1904 until 1913, Rae represented the Pateley Bridge division on the West Riding County Council.

Through this association with the area, Rae first stood for Parliament in the December 1910 general election contesting the constituency of Ripon for the Liberals. Although he cut the majority of the sitting Unionist MP Edward Wood (later Lord Halifax), he was not elected.

In 1918 Rae was adopted as the Coalition Liberal candidate for the Shipley Division in the West Riding of Yorkshire. As the official Coalition candidate he stood as a supporter of the Coalition government of Prime Minister David Lloyd George. As the government candidate, he was not opposed by Lloyd George's Conservative partners in the Coalition and was awarded the Coalition coupon. In a straight fight with a Labour opponent, Tom Snowden, who later became Labour MP for Accrington, Rae won with a majority of 11,010 votes.

Rae was re-elected as MP for Shipley at the 1922 general election as a National Liberal, i.e. a continuing supporter of Lloyd George but this time in a much tighter contest. He was still not opposed by the Tories but he did face a strong Labour challenge from William Mackinder and also from an Asquithian Independent Liberal, Mr A Davy. Rae's majority over Labour was reduced to 1,041 votes.

Rae was knighted in 1922 but chose not to contest any further Parliamentary elections. At the 1923 general election William Mackinder gained Shipley for Labour.

== Philanthropy ==
Rae donated large sums of money to various good causes. He gave £12,000 for university scholarships to a number of schools in the West Riding of Yorkshire - including some monies set aside for female students - and donated large sums to his old school Batley Grammar. He also gave £10,000 for a private hospital at Shipley for the care of people of limited financial means. He made gifts of land amounting to 200 acres (0.81 km^{2}) and valued at around £250,000 to the local council to create Northcliffe Park. He also gave the council £12,500 in 1919 for the purchase of 114 acres (0.46 km^{2}) of land including 42 acres (170,000 m^{2}) of woodland to serve as a combination of parks, playing fields and allotments for local residents. In addition, in association with Mr J E Sharman (1869 in Halifax, West Yorkshire to John Sharman and Jane Ann Earl - 26 Nov 1928 in Rossett Manor), he purchased for the public Oakwell Hall, an Elizabethan Manor House at Birstall near Leeds with connections to Charlotte Brontë.

== Death ==
Rae had a history of heart trouble and on 31 December 1928 in Batley, while he was taking tea with a lady to whom he recently become engaged to be married, he collapsed and died at the age of 68 years.

Parliament of the United Kingdom
Preceded by Oswald Partington	Member of Parliament for Shipley; 1918 – 1923	Succeeded by William Mackinder
