= Drummond Mill =

Mill building in Bradford, West Yorkshire, England

Coordinates: 53.8004°N 1.7641°W

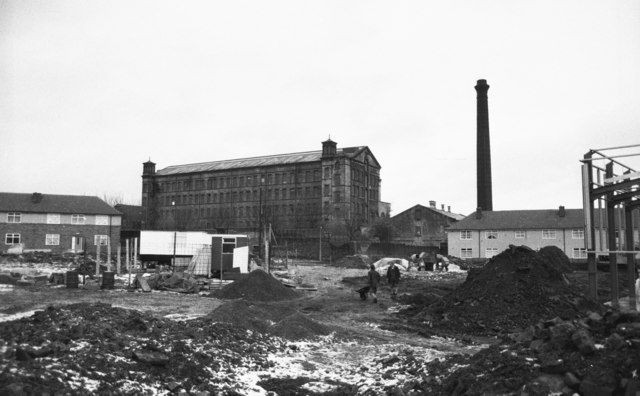
Drummond Mill (1983)

Drummond Mill was a complex of industrial buildings on Lumb Lane, Manningham, Bradford, West Yorkshire. It contained originally a spinning mill, a warehouse, a spinning shed, and an engine house with chimney and was destroyed in a fire on 28 January 2016.

As of May 2019 the site of the former mill was advertised as available for redevelopment, although the new owners of the land are currently unknown.

== History ==
The factory was built for James Drummond & Son by the architects Henry Francis Lockwood and William Mawson and was practically finished in December 1885. In 1886 the premises were opened for business. Production ceased in 2001. The complex was declared a Grade II listed building in 1979. The site was acquired by SKA Textiles, based in Huddersfield. The buildings were used for storage purposes and by theatre groups. While plans submitted in 2004 for the development of flats and businesses in the former mill had failed, new ones were submitted in 2012. The site was also the seat of the head offices of the World Curry Festival.

=== The fire ===
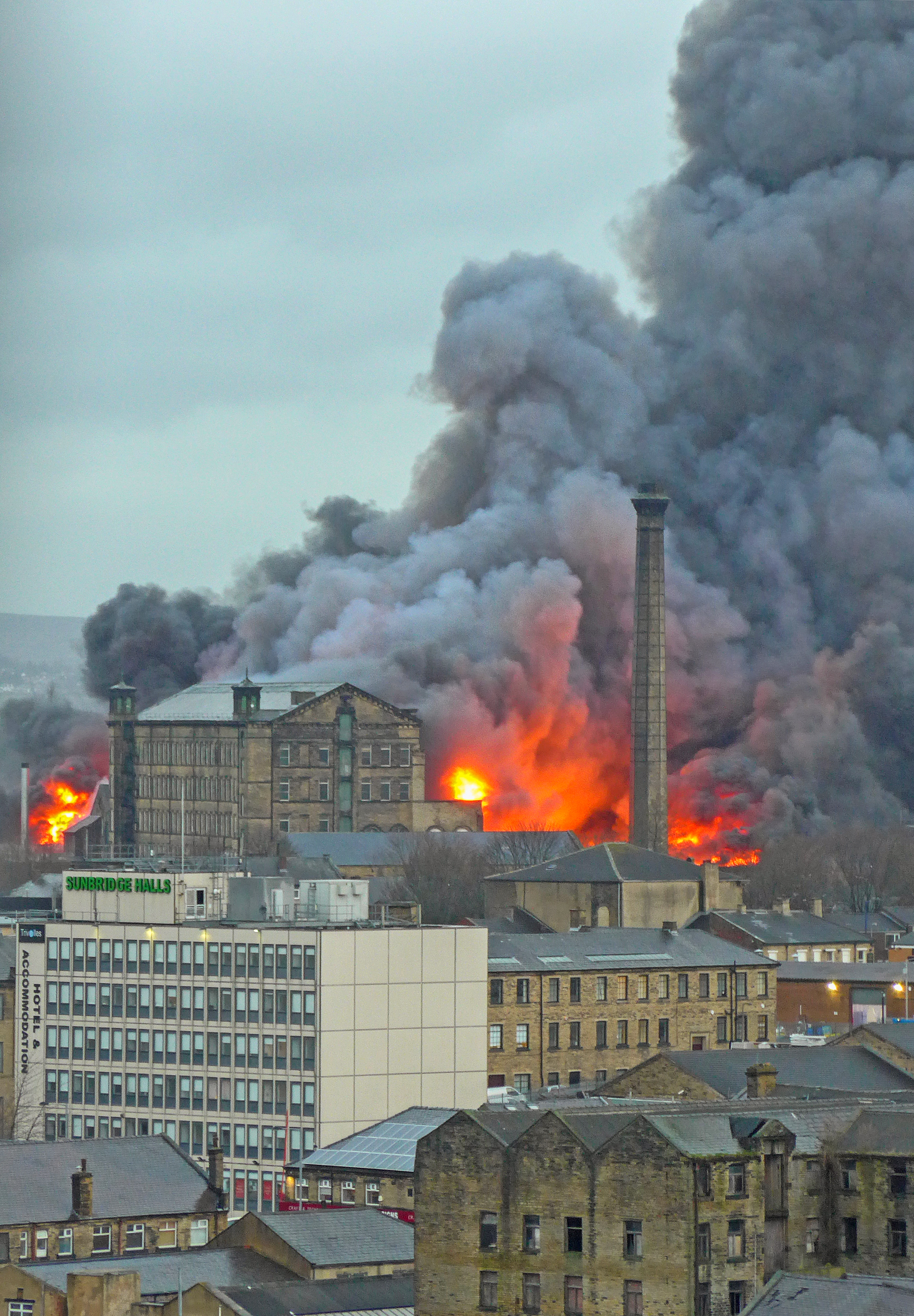
Drummond Mill burning

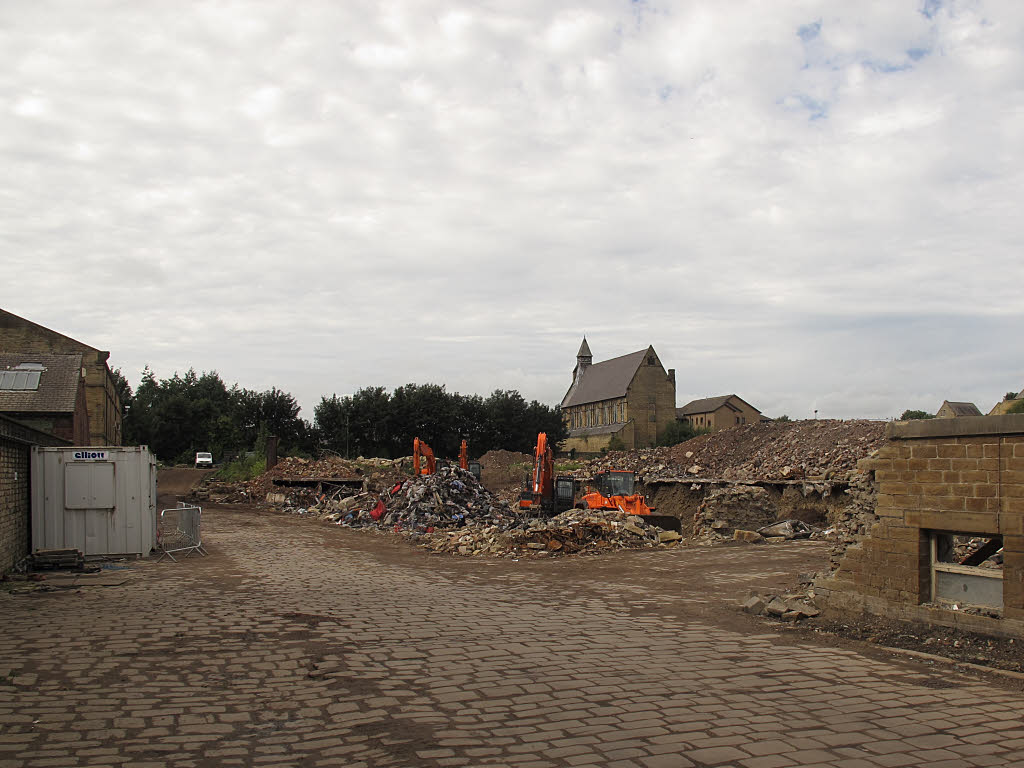
The demolished building

On 28 January 2016 in windy weather, a fire broke out in the basement of Drummond Mills which was used to store flammable goods, among them cardboard boxes. West Yorkshire Fire and Rescue Service was called around 11:30. The fire spread so rapidly that saving the historic building became impossible. Firefighting efforts had to be concentrated on its containment and the protection of neighbouring properties. Residents and employees there had to be evacuated because of the smoke. Reaching its peak around 15:00, the fire was under control by 22:30. The partial collapse of the buildings necessitated their demolition, making it impossible to ascertain the cause of the fire. Demolition continued in May 2016 and was expected to take until autumn of the same year. The fire caused appeals to preserve the industrial heritage of West Yorkshire.

== Buildings ==
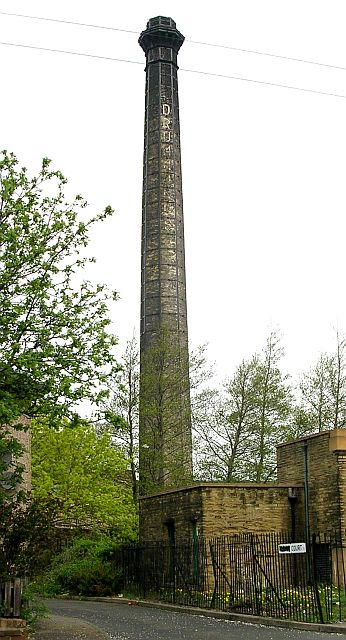
Drummond Mill chimney

The mill was built of sandstone blocks with ashlar dressings in an italianate style similar to that of Salts Mill in Saltaire, albeit of a more sober design. Cast iron pillars and double skin floors provided a measure of fireproofing, which was important due to the large amount of flammable materials usually found in a textile mill. The spinning mill was originally flanked by stair turrets on both sides, although those on the Lumb Lane side were removed later. The spinning shed linked the three-storey warehouse with the five-storey main building, which in turn was linked to the boiler house. The octagonal chimney of the latter, which stands on a square plinth, has been named as "one of the best mill chimneys in Bradford" by Historic England.
