= Heaton Woods =

Woodland and charity in Bradford, West Yorkshire, England

Coordinates: 53.821°N 1.792°W

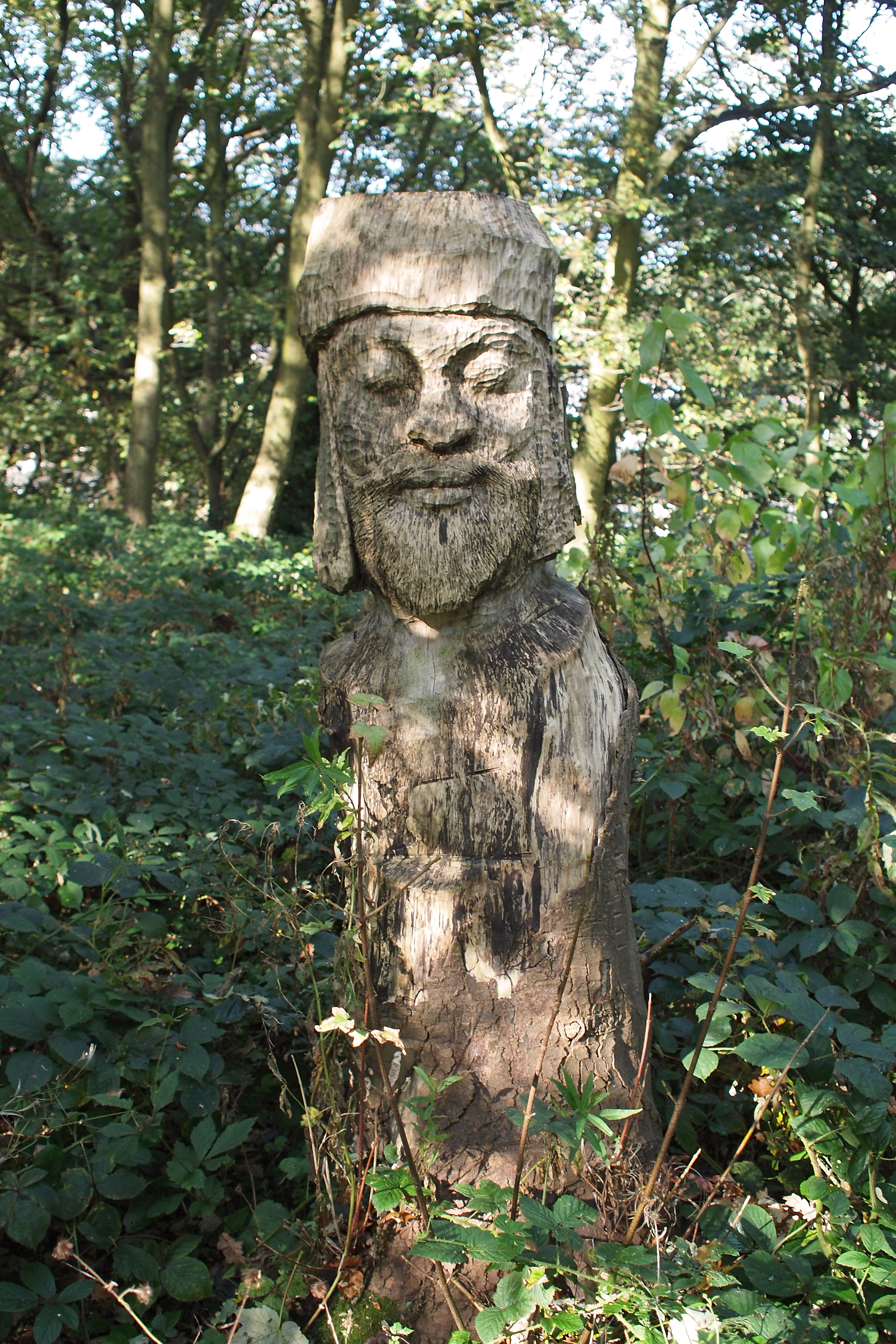
Wooden sculpture in Heaton Woods

The Heaton Woods Trust is both the name for the charity and the woodland it cares for located mainly in Heaton, Bradford, West Yorkshire, England but also stretches into Shipley. The Heaton Woods Trust is a registered charity that was established in 1977. The Heaton Woods Trust is responsible for the care and protection of the woods for the benefit of present and future generations.

The charity's ownership is nearly 50 acres which, broadly speaking, extends from Park Drive/Redburn through to the Cat Steps at the bottom of Quarry Street. The Trust also works closely with The Friends of Northcliffe and the Dixon family whose woodland ownership surrounds Six Days Only.

The Heaton Woods Trust is funded by charitable donations from the community, paid annual memberships (currently totalling over 160 members from the local community) and fundraising activities such as its annual Open Day and Arboricultural Day. In addition The Heaton Woods Trust receives grants from various sources.

== The Heaton Woods Trust Aims ==
Its main purpose is to preserve, replant and maintain The Heaton Woods Trust (nearly 50 acres) in order for current and future generations to enjoy.

== Brief Biography of The Heaton Woods Trust Trustees and Committee Members ==
The Heaton Woods Trust has four trustees and is run by a committee of local unpaid volunteers such as retirees (e.g. teachers and Councillors), a (current) JP magistrate, pensioners, church volunteers and university graduates all aged between 27 – 85. They have committee members including those with disabilities (physical and mental), different religions and nationalities e.g. British, Italian, Asian etc. Each month the committee holds a meeting to discuss the Trust's finances, work that needs to be conducted, current issues in regards to the woodland and what improvements could be made to ultimately benefit the community the charity serves.

== History of The Heaton Woods Trust ==
Its first purchase was a piece of farmland that they came to call “Renold Woods” in 1982 (5.5 acres) where over 4000 trees were planted Approximately 20 local residents at the time paid £500.00 each to acquire this land in order to avoid it being used as a housing development. They did this with the sole aim of preserving a piece of countryside and woodland within a small corner of Bradford. Within the past 15 years the Heaton Woods Trust received the necessary funding for Sean's Pond.

Over the years The Heaton Woods Trust acquired two further pieces of farmland increasing the woodland to its current size which are now named “Rosse Woods” after their president, the Earl of Rosse and “Lower Wood.”

== Past Issues In The Heaton Woods Trust ==
Alongside asking its visitors to follow the Countryside Code, one of the charity's rules that it emphatically enforces is having all dogs on a lead at all times whilst visiting The Heaton Woods Trust woodland. Back in 2006 the charity had major issues with dogs considered to be dangerous being off their leads and roaming freely around the woodland. This subsequently led to both other dogs and people being viciously attacked. As a result, local campaigners created a petition calling on the Bradford Council to create more safeguards and enforce legislation on protecting the public (including visitors to The Heaton Woods Trust woodland) from dangerous dogs.

Following on from the creation of this petition by local campaigners, the dog attacks continued with them becoming more commonplace in The Heaton Woods Trust woodland. Due to these developments, local walkers and visitors became scared and avoided visiting the woodland. In addition, the local newspaper Telegraph and Argus got involved and started their own campaign called "The T&A Curb The Danger Dogs Campaign."

In 2010 the dog attacks subsided significantly as legislation was being enforced at Bradford Crown Court against both the dangerous dogs involved in the attacks on the woodland and also their owners. This resulted in the reintroduction of the local residents visiting The Heaton Woods Trust woodland again as a significant decrease in dog attacks were being reported.

To this day, The Heaton Woods Trust still has a problem with a small portion of dog walkers not using leads in the woodland although at present no dog attacks have been reported in recent years.

== Current Issues In The Heaton Woods Trust ==
The Heaton Woods Trust in recent years have suffered from criminals attempting to steal its machinery and assorted tools that are used by volunteers to maintain and improve the woodland for its visitors and the local community.

Vandalism is an ongoing problem in The Heaton Woods Trust with various waterways being blocked, litter not being disposed of properly, trees being damaged and benches (some of them being memorial benches) having graffiti on them.

A boundary dispute that has lasted for well over a decade so far is still ongoing between The Heaton Woods Trust conservationists and a property developer over a piece of land. Both sides claim they have sufficient evidence to prove their "rightful ownership" over this disputed area.

== Track Record and Endorsements ==
In 1991 The Heaton Woods Trust was named Regional Winners in Yorkshire and Humberside in the Tidy Britain Spring Clean Award.

For its Millennium contribution, with the assistance of monies from the Forestry Authority and Bradford Environmental Action Trust via Landfill Tax, they planted 2000 trees in Rosse Woods.

Over the years The Heaton Woods Trust acquired may grants and awards. Recently they have been awarded a Community Chest Grant from Bradford Council's Department of Environment and Sport. Although most notably The Royal Forestry Society came to The Heaton Woods Trust in 2009 and 2014. In both instances the competition judges from the Forestry Commission visited and inspected many woodlands. From both visits the charity won The Best Kept Woodland in Northern England 2009 and most recently the Best of England Woodlands: Community Woodland Award Winner 2014.
