= Listed buildings in Bradford (Great Horton Ward) =

Great Horton is a ward in the metropolitan borough of the City of Bradford, West Yorkshire, England. It contains 74 listed buildings that are recorded in the National Heritage List for England. Of these, one is listed at Grade II*, the middle of the three grades, and the others are at Grade II, the lowest grade. The ward is to the southeast of the centre of the city of Bradford and is mainly residential. Most of the listed buildings are houses and cottages and associated structures, farmhouses and farm buildings. The other listed buildings include public houses, churches and chapels, former mills, a former school, a library, and a pair of telephone kiosks.

== Key ==
Grade	Criteria
II*	Particularly important buildings of more than special interest
II	Buildings of national importance and special interest

== Buildings ==
Name and location	Photograph	Date	Notes	Grade
7 and 8 Knights Fold and 483 and 485 Great Horton Road; 53.78060°N 1.78493°W		Late 17th century	A farmhouse, later divided into four cottages, it is in sandstone with quoins, and a stone slate roof with saddlestones and shaped kneelers. There are two storeys, the windows are mullioned, and the central doorway has an ornamental lintel.	II
808 Great Horton Road; 53.77739°N 1.79193°W	—	Late 17th century	A former farmhouse, it is in sandstone, with quoins and a stone slate roof with saddlestones. There are two storeys and a rear outshut. The doorway has a chamfered surround and the windows are mullioned with three, four or five lights, and all the openings have hood moulds.	II
634 and 636 Great Horton Road and 3 Westcroft Road; 53.78076°N 1.78565°W	—	1697	Originally Hall's House and later divided, it is in sandstone, with quoins, a string course, and a stone slate roof with saddlestones and shaped gritstone kneelers. There are two storeys and a symmetrical front of three bays. The central doorway has moulded jambs and imposts, and above it is an initialled and dated panel, and an upright oval window. In the outer bays are three-light mullioned windows, and in the east gable end is an oval window with panelled spandrels.	II
24, 38, 32, 34 and 34A Windermere Road; 53.77673°N 1.80014°W	—	1714	A manor house that was later refronted, with a barn to the right, and a cottage added further to the right in the 19th century. They are in sandstone, and have stone slate roofs with saddlestones and kneelers. The house has rusticated quoins, a band, two storeys, and a symmetrical front of five bays. The windows and doorway have architraves, and above the doorway is a dated and initialled plaque.	II
Birks Farmhouse; 53.79208°N 1.79548°W	—	Early to mid 18th century	A sandstone house with quoins, and a stone slate roof with saddlestones and coped kneelers. There are two storeys and a lean-to entrance on the east side. Most of the windows are mullioned, with some mullions removed, there is a mullioned and transomed stair window, and a blind bull's eye window.	II
King's Arms Public House; 53.78054°N 1.78567°W		1739	The public house is in sandstone with a stuccoed front and a quarry slate roof. There are two storeys and three bays. The doorway has a Gibbs surround and an initialled and dated keystone. To its right and above it are single-light windows, and the other windows are mullioned with two lights.	II
Brooksbank House; 53.78016°N 1.78644°W	—	1746	A hall in sandstone with a band, corbelled eaves and a hipped stone slate roof. There are two storeys and a half H-shaped plan, consisting of a four-bay hall range and gabled rear wings. The later doorway has an architrave and a pediment, and above it is the re-set former coped doorhead. The windows are mullioned and transomed.	II*
3 and 5 Bartle Fold; 53.78027°N 1.78675°W	—	c. 1750	Probably originally a service wing to Brooksbank House, it is in sandstone with quoins, one chamfered corner, and a stone slate roof with shaped kneelers. There are two storeys, and the windows are mullioned with two or three lights. There are is a blocked doorway in the upper floor, and two doorways in the ground floor with squared jambs.	II
505–513 Great Horton Road; 53.78000°N 1.78560°W	—	Mid 18th century	A row of cottages and shops in sandstone, with quoins and stone slate roofs. There are two storeys, mullioned windows, and shop fronts. No. 513 projects, it is taller, and has gables with saddlestones and shaped kneelers. Above the shop front is a cornice over the fascia.	II
Garden wall and gate piers, Brooksbank House; 53.77989°N 1.78625°W	—	Mid 18th century	The wall enclosing the garden is in sandstone with round coping stones. The gate piers are monoliths with cornice capping.	II
Knights Fold, 724, 726 and 728 Great Horton Road; 53.77910°N 1.78864°W	—	1752	A row of three sandstone cottages with a stone slate roof. There are two storeys, the doorways have squared jambs, some windows have single lights, and the others are mullioned with two lights. On the front is an oval dated and initialled plaque.	II
220 Legrams Lane and barn 53.78934°N 1.78662°W	—	Late 18th century	The farmhouse and barn have been converted into two dwellings. They are in sandstone and have a stone slate roof with saddlestones and kneelers. There are two storeys, and the house contains sash and two-light mullioned windows. The barn projects and has a tall central portal, a triangular dovecote, and narrow round-headed openings.	II
Legrams House and barn 53.78878°N 1.78781°W		1779	The farmhouse and attached barn have been altered, a house was added to the left in about 1860, and the building has since used for other purposes. It is in sandstone with two storeys, and has stone slate roofs with a saddlestone and kneelers at the gable end of the barn. The original farmhouse has a symmetrical front of three bays. In the centre are paired doorways with squared jambs, one blocked, above it is a Venetian window and the other windows have been altered. The openings in the barn have also been altered, and in the gable end is a triangular dovecote. The later house is taller, and has chamfered quoins, and an eaves cornice on modillion brackets. It contains a porch with engaged columns and an entablature, canted bay windows in the ground floor, and windows with architraves above.	II
140–144 Beacon Road; 53.76901°N 1.78868°W	—	c. 1800	A row of sandstone cottages at right angles to the road, that have stone slate roofs with small shaped kneelers. There are two storeys, the doorways have plain surrounds, and the windows are mullioned with two lights.	II
156–162 Beacon Road; 53.76901°N 1.78868°W	—	c. 1800	A row of sandstone cottages at right angles to the road with stone slate roofs. They have two storeys, and the windows have single lights or are mullioned with two lights. No. 162 has been refaced, and has a gable with block kneelers.	II
682–686 Great Horton Road; 53.77978°N 1.78664°W	—	c. 1800	A row of cottages, some converted into shops, they are in sandstone with quoins, and a stone slate roof with a saddlestone and kneelers. In the ground floor are doorways with squared jambs and shop fronts, and the windows are mullioned with two lights.	II
15–29 Perseverance Lane; 53.77974°N 1.78277°W	—	c. 1800	A row of sandstone cottages, one with a sill band, and all with stone slate roofs. They have one storey apart from No. 29, which has two. The doorways have squared jambs, and the windows are mullioned with two lights.	II
6, 8 and 10 Ramsden Court; 53.78002°N 1.78709°W	—	c. 1800	A row of sandstone cottages, rendered at the front, with shaped eaves brackets, and stone slate roofs with saddlestones. There are two storeys, and the doorways have plain surrounds. The windows of No. 6 are modern replacements, and in the other houses they are mullioned with two or three lights.	II
Knights Fold, 718 and 720 Great Horton Road; 53.77918°N 1.78844°W	—	c. 1800	A pair of sandstone cottages that have a stone slate roof with saddlestones. There are two storeys, the doorways have squared jambs, and the windows are mullioned with two lights.	II
10 and 12 Dracup Road; 53.77919°N 1.78878°W	—	c. 1800–20	A pair of sandstone houses that have been altered. There are two storeys, and No. 10 has retained its square mullioned windows.	II
14 and 16 Dracup Road; 53.77916°N 1.78909°W	—	c. 1800–20	Two adjoining sandstone houses with stone slate roofs. No. 14 has two storeys and is partly rendered, and No. 16 has one storey. The doorways have squared jambs, and the mullions have been removed from the windows.	II
25 and 27 Dracup Road; 53.77947°N 1.78998°W	—	c. 1800–20	A pair of sandstone cottages in a row with stone slate roofs. The doorways have squared jambs, there is one single-light window, and the other windows are mullioned with two lights.	II
651–659 Great Horton Road; 53.77741°N 1.79067°W	—	c. 1800–20	A row of sandstone cottages that have a stone slate roof with saddlestones. There are two storeys, the doorways have squared jambs, and most of the windows are mullioned, with some mullions removed.	II
702, 704 and 706 Great Horton Road; 53.77943°N 1.78789°W	—	c. 1800–20	A row of three sandstone cottages that have a stone slate roof with saddlestones. There are two storeys, and the doorways have squared jambs. Some windows are mullioned, and the mullions have been removed from others.	II
1 and 2 Rudd Street; 53.77966°N 1.78309°W	—	c. 1800–20	A pair of sandstone houses with a stone slate roof. There are two storeys, and each house has a doorway with squared jambs to the right, and a window in each floor from which the mullions have been removed.	II
3, 4 and 5 Rudd Street; 53.77972°N 1.78325°W	—	c. 1800–20	A row of three sandstone houses with a stone slate roof. There is one storey, the doorways have squared jambs, the windows are mullioned with three lights, and some mullions have been removed.	II
250–258 Southfield Lane and 10 Low Green; 53.77911°N 1.78255°W	—	c. 1800–20	A row of sandstone cottages with quoins, block brackets to the eaves, and stone slate roofs with saddlestone. There are two storeys, and No. 250 protrudes slightly. The doorways have squared jambs, there are some single-light windows, and most windows are mullioned with two lights.	II
Suddards Fold; 53.77996°N 1.78253°W	—	c. 1800–20	A group of sandstone cottages that have a stone slate roof with a saddlestone and shaped kneelers. There are two storeys, and the cottages form an L-shaped plan. The doorways have squared jambs, and the windows are mullioned with two lights.	II
George and Dragon Public House; 53.77899°N 1.78862°W		c. 1800–20	The public house is in painted sandstone with a stone slate roof. There are two storeys, and it contains two two-storey canted bay windows with hipped roofs. To the left is a doorway with a cornice, and above is a single-light window. Attached further to the left is a one-bay recessed dwelling with a plain doorway, a window to the left, and a two-light mullioned window above.	II
421–449 Great Horton Road; 53.78155°N 1.78364°W	—	c. 1800–30	A row of sandstone cottages in two blocks stepped up a hill. They have sill bands, bracketed eaves, and stone slate roofs, some with saddlestones. There are two storeys and most cottages have two bays. The windows are mainly mullioned, with two or three lights, and some mullions have been removed. No. 421 has sash windows and a cornice over the doorway, and the doorway of No. 441 has pilasters.	II
Knights Fold, 730 Great Horton Road; 53.77907°N 1.78844°W	—	c. 1800–30	A sandstone cottage with a stone slate roof. There are two storeys, the doorway has squared jambs, and the windows are mullioned with two lights.	II
Former Old Bell Chapel; 53.77910°N 1.78388°W		1806	The chapel, later used for other purposes, is in sandstone on a plinth, with a band, a bracketed eaves cornice, and a stone slate roof with saddlestones. There are two storeys, sides of five bays and ends of three bays. The southeast front has a simple pediment, and contains a Venetian window. In the northwest end is an entrance with a corniced hood on consoles, a plaque, and a large circular inscribed panel.	II
3–21 Pickles Lane; 53.77514°N 1.79413°W	—	c. 1812	A row of sandstone cottages stepped down a slope, with stone slate roofs. They have two storeys, doorways with squared jambs, and two-light mullioned windows.	II
4 and 6 Pickles Lane; 53.77531°N 1.79445°W	—	c. 1812	A pair of sandstone cottages with stone slate roofs. They have two storeys, doorways with squared jambs, and two-light mullioned windows.	II
Great Horton Methodist Church; 53.78162°N 1.78501°W		1814	The church, which was altered and extended in 1862, is in sandstone and has a front of five bays, with quoin pilasters and sill bands. At the top is a deep entablature and a cornice, and on the corners are ornate swagged urns. In the middle three bays is a giant Corinthian portico in antis, above which is a bracketed pediment containing a dated cartouche with an anthemion crest and surmounted by an anthemion acroterion. The three doorways have round-arched heads with keystones on consoles. In the outer bays the ground floor windows have architraves and segmental-arched heads, and in the upper floor hey have round-arched heads, pilasters and segmental pediments.	II
5–14 Cragg Lane; 53.77845°N 1.78843°W	—	c. 1820	A row of stone cottages with a sill band, blocked bracketed eaves, and a stone slate roof. There are two storeys, the doorways have squared jambs, the windows above the doorways have single lights, and the other windows are mullioned with two lights.	II
396 and 398 Hollingwood Lane; 53.77491°N 1.80444°W	—	c. 1820	A row of cottages in painted sandstone with pantile roofs. There is one storey, the doorways have squared jambs, and the windows are mullioned with two lights.	II
896A and 898–906 Great Horton Road; 53.77578°N 1.79439°W	—	c. 1820–30	A group of sandstone cottages with shallow eaves brackets, stone slate roofs, and two storeys. No. 906 is a separate taller cottage on the left, and the others form a row. The doorways have squared jambs, some of the windows have single lights, some are mullioned, and some of the mullions have been removed.	II
202–214 Haycliffe Lane; 53.77418°N 1.78110°W	—	c. 1820–30	A row of sandstone cottages stepped up a hill, with sill bands, bracketed eaves, and stone slate roofs. There are two storeys, the doorways have squared jambs, some of the windows have single lights, some are mullioned, and some of the mullions have been removed.	II
106–118 Hollingwood Lane; 53.78165°N 1.79731°W	—	c. 1820–30	A row of sandstone cottages stepped up a hill, with block brackets to the eaves and stone slate roofs. There are two storeys, the doorways have squared jambs, some of the windows have single lights, some are mullioned, and some of the mullions have been removed.	II
Sams Mill; 53.79436°N 1.79508°W	—	c. 1820–30	The rebuild of an earlier water mill and later used for other purposes, it is in sandstone with corbelled eaves, and stone slate roofs with coped gables. There are three storeys and an L-shaped plan. The windows have squared jambs. In the south gable is a round-headed hatchway flanked by lunettes, and in the east gable end are round-headed lights flanking the central windows.	II
182 Beacon Road and 174 to the rear 53.76922°N 1.78953°W	—	Early 19th century	A sandstone cottage that has a stone slate roof and one gable end with a saddlestone and kneelers. There are two storeys, the doorway has squared jambs, above it is a single-light window, and the other windows are mullioned with two lights.	II
184 and 186 Beacon Road and 178 to the rear 53.76929°N 1.78970°W	—	Early 19th century	A group of cottages in sandstone with stone slate roofs. There is one storey, the doorways have squared jambs, and the windows are mullioned with two lights.	II
188, 190 and 194 Beacon Road; 53.76930°N 1.78969°W	—	Early 19th century	A group of sandstone cottages with stone slate roofs. They have one storey, the doorways have squared jambs, and the windows are mullioned with two lights.	II
270–276 Cemetery Road; 53.78854°N 1.79111°W	—	Early 19th century	A row of sandstone cottages with a sill band, bracketed eaves and a stone slate roof. There are two storeys, and the doorways have squared jambs. No. 276 has a bay window, some of the other windows have single lights, and the rest are mullioned with two lights.	II
280 and 282 Cemetery Road; 53.78832°N 1.79095°W	—	Early 19th century	A pair of sandstone cottages with a sill band and a stone slate roof. There are two storeys, the doorways have squared jambs, some of the windows have single lights, the rest are mullioned with two lights, and some mullions have been removed.	II
1 and 3 Clayton Road; 53.78725°N 1.78933°W	—	Early 19th century	A pair of cottages, at one time a public house, they are in sandstone with a stone slate roof. There are two storeys, the doorways have plain surrounds, some windows have single lights, and the others are mullioned.	II
535 Great Horton Road; 53.77936°N 1.78674°W	—	Early 19th century	A former public house to which a wing was added later at the front. It is in sandstone, and has a stone slate roof with saddlestones and shaped kneelers. The original part has mullioned windows, and in the wing are similar but taller windows.	II
1039 and 1041 Great Horton Road; 53.77426°N 1.80501°W		Early 19th century	A pair of sandstone cottages with sill bands, paired eaves brackets, and a stone slate roof. There are two storeys, and each cottage has a doorway with squared jambs to the right, and a two-light mullioned window in each floor.	II
36 Windermere Road and barn 53.77683°N 1.80063°W	—	Early 19th century	A former farmhouse and barn in sandstone with a stone slate roof. There are two storeys, at the rear are two-light mullioned windows, and the other windows are replacements. The barn has a projecting portal.	II
306–314 Cemetery Road; 53.78765°N 1.79002°W	—	c. 1830	A row of sandstone cottages with bracketed eaves and a stone slate roof. There are two storeys, the doorways have squared jambs, and the windows are mullioned with two lights.	II
17–21 Clayton Road; 53.78687°N 1.78984°W	—	c. 1830	A row of three sandstone cottages, with block eaves brackets, and a stone slate roof. There are two storeys and each cottage has two bays. In the right bay of each cottage is a doorway with squared jambs, above it is a single-light window, and in the left bay is a two-light mullioned window in each floor.	II
2–24 and 3–13 Club Street; 53.78826°N 1.78995°W	—	c. 1830	Rows of sandstone cottages on two sides of a street, slightly stepped down a slope. They have stone slate roofs, two storeys, and doorways with squared jambs. Some of the windows have single lights, and the others have two lights with mullions.	II
910 Great Horton Road; 53.77570°N 1.79473°W	—	c. 1830	A sandstone cottage with paired block brackets to the eaves and a stone slate roof. There is one storey, a doorway and a window to the right, both with plain surrounds.	II
11 and 13 Ramsden Court; 53.77985°N 1.78718°W	—	c. 1830	A pair of sandstone cottages with a stone slate roof. There are two storeys, and each cottage has a doorway with a fanlight to the left, and a two-light mullioned sash window in each floor on the right.	II
194–200 Haycliffe Lane; 53.77430°N 1.78054°W	—	c. 1830–40	A row of four sandstone cottages with block bracketed eaves and a stone slate roof. There are two storeys, the doorways have squared jambs, some windows have single lights, some are mullioned with two lights, and some mullions have been removed.	II
1 Legrams Lane; 53.78913°N 1.78702°W	—	c. 1830–50	A former lodge, it is in sandstone, with a hipped slate roof. There is one storey, and it contains a central doorway with a rectangular fanlight flanked by sash windows.	II
24, 26 and 28 Perseverance Lane and 12, 14 and 16 Liversedge Row; 53.77967°N 1.78223°W	—	c. 1830–50	A group of sandstone cottages, some painted, with stone slate roofs. There are two storeys, and the windows are mullioned, with two or three lights.	II
32 and 34 Perseverance erence Lane and 6, 8 and 10 Liversedge Row; 53.77973°N 1.78207°W	—	c. 1830–50	Two cottages and a pair of houses in sandstone with stone slate roofs. The cottages have two storeys and the houses have three. The windows are mullioned, with two or three lights. The doorways have squared jambs, and in Nos. 8 and 10 they are paired with a shared hood on console brackets.	II
5 and 7 Clayton Road; 53.78712°N 1.78945°W	—	Early to mid 19th century	A pair of sandstone cottages set back from the road. They have two storeys, doorways with squared jambs, single-light windows in the upper floor, and two-light mullioned windows in the ground floor.	II
Former Grattan Sports and Social Club; 53.78654°N 1.79067°W		Early to mid 19th century	Originally a chapel, later used for other purposes, it is in stone with a cornice string course, and a slate roof with saddlestones on the gables. There are three bays. In the middle bay is a doorway with a pointed arch and a hood mould, and the outer bays contain triple lancet windows, the middle windows higher. At the right is a sandstone extension, originally a Sunday school, with mullioned and transomed windows.	II
Main block, Lane Close Mills; 53.77829°N 1.79020°W	—	1841	The worsted mill was extended in 1847. It is in sandstone with block bracketed eaves and stone slate roofs. There are two two-storey ranges parallel to the road, each with a segmental-arched entry with voussoirs and dated keystones. Between the ranges is a later link, and at the rear is a three-storey wing, the gable end with a bellcote and containing an oculus. In the rear yard is a doorway flanked by octagonal piers.	II
41 and 43 Bartle Lane; 53.77769°N 1.79476°W	—	c. 1850	A pair of sandstone houses with a sill band, bracketed eaves, and a hipped slate roof. There are two storeys, and each house has two bays. In the ground floor of each house is a doorway in the outer bay and a window in the inner bay, all are round-arched, with keystones and an impost band. In the upper floor, the windows are flat-headed, and all are sashes.	II
Former Great Horton United Reformed Church; 53.78207°N 1.78414°W		1851–52	The former church is in sandstone on a plinth, with an impost band, a moulded string course, a sill band, a moulded eaves cornice, and a hipped slate roof. There are two storeys and a symmetrical front of five bays. The middle bay contains a Venetian window in each floor, the upper window blocked. Flanking these are doorways with architraves and pediments on consoles. The other windows have round-arched heads, impost blocks and keystones.	II
Main block, Southfield Education Centre; 53.77874°N 1.78408°W		1859	Originally a school and master's house, later used for other purposes, it is in sandstone on a coped plinth, with moulded eaves, and a Welsh slate roof with saddlestones. There is one storey and a symmetrical front of 13 bays. The middle bay is taller with a truncated gable, and it contains a tall window with a pointed arch. Other bays have smaller gables, and the master's house has a canted mullioned bay window.	II
St John's Church; 53.78086°N 1.78629°W		1871–74	The church is in gritstone, and consists of a nave with a clerestory, north and south aisles, a south porch, a chancel with a semicircular apse, and a southeast steeple. The steeple has an unbuttressed tower with a stair tower, and at the top is machicolation, square pinnacles, and an octagonal spire with one tier of lucarnes.	II
St Wilfrid's Church; 53.78631°N 1.78977°W		1905	The church was designed by Temple Moore, and is in stone with a roof of red tile. It consists of a nave, north and south aisles and a chancel, all under one roof. There are west and south doorways, and at the east end is a flat-roofed porch. On the northeast corner is a small bellcote. The windows are of various styles, and contain Decorated tracery.	II
Great Horton Library; 53.78202°N 1.78279°W		1912–13	The library is in stone with slate roofs, and consists of a two-storey central block and flanking one-storey wings. The central block has a hipped roof, and a flèche with a weathervane. In the centre is an entrance with a segmental arch, over which is a coat of arms and a canted oriel window with a parapet carved with a wreath and the date. The outer wings each has a parapet with a central gable, and the central window has a heavy lintel and a keystone. The windows are transomed or mullioned and transomed.	II
Pair of telephone kiosks 53.78019°N 1.78587°W	—	1935	The telephone kiosks are near the junction of Great Horton Road and Saint Street. They are of the K6 type, designed by Giles Gilbert Scott. Constructed in cast iron with a square plan and a dome, they have unperforated crowns in the top panels.	II
20 and 22 Dracup Road; 53.77927°N 1.78928°W	—	Unknown	A pair of houses, originally three cottages partly back to back, they are in sandstone with a stone slate roof, and the gable end facing the street. The doorways have squared jambs, the rear doorway also with a cornice, and the windows are mullioned, with some mullions removed.	II
