= Listed buildings in Bradford (Heaton Ward) =

Heaton is a ward in the metropolitan borough of the City of Bradford, West Yorkshire, England. It contains 32 listed buildings that are recorded in the National Heritage List for England. Of these, four are listed at Grade II*, the middle of the three grades, and the others are at Grade II, the lowest grade. The ward is to the northwest of the centre of the city of Bradford, and contains the areas of Heaton and Frizinghall. The southern part of the ward is residential, and the northern part is rural. Most of the listed buildings are houses, cottages and associated structures, farmhouses and farm buildings. In the ward is Lister Park, which contains a listed memorial gatehouse and a memorial containing a statue. The other listed buildings include churches and a presbytery, a public house, a college, and a factory.

== Key ==
Grade	Criteria
II*	Particularly important buildings of more than special interest
II	Buildings of national importance and special interest

== Buildings ==
Name and location	Photograph	Date	Notes	Grade
7 Shay Lane; 53.82075°N 1.79369°W	—	1632	A rendered house that has a stone slate roof with s coped gable, a moulded kneeler, and a shaped finial on the right. There are two storeys and four bays. On the front is a porch containing a stone seat. The main doorway, a doorway to the left, a rear doorway, and a loading door all have Tudor arched heads. Most of the windows are mullioned, some with hood moulds, and others are altered or inserted. On the right return is an initialled and dated tablet.	II
Royds Hall Farmhouse; 53.82090°N 1.79413°W	—	1632	A gritstone house that has a stone slate roof with saddlestones and prominent kneelers. There are two storeys and an H-shaped plan, consisting of a hall range and flanking cross-wings, and a rear wing. The doorway has a chamfered surround and a four-centred arched head. The windows are mullioned with hood moulds, and the lights in the ground floor of the hall range have round heads.	II*
8 and 9 Shay Lane; 53.82069°N 1.79390°W		17th century	A house and a cottage, the latter added in the 18th or 19th century, They are in stone, rendered on the front, with stone slate roofs, and coped gables on the left. There are two storeys, the house has three bays, and the cottage has one. Most of the windows are mullioned, with some mullions removed, and there is a part-blocked taking-in door.	II
West Bradford Golf Club House; 53.81276°N 1.81704°W	—	Late 17th to early 18th century	The house has been rebuilt and considerably extended. The original part is in gritstone, the later part is in sandstone, the roof is in stone slate, and there are two storeys. The earlier part has a string course, an arched doorway with a chamfered surround, and a parapet containing an oval window and with ball finials. The later part has three bays, quoins, and the roof has saddlestones and kneelers. Most of the windows are mullioned.	II
Barn and outbuilding east of 7 Shay Lane; 53.82071°N 1.79339°W	—	Early 18th century	A barn and a cottage, later an outbuilding, they are in stone with quoins, a stone slate roof, and a single storey. On the front is a continuous outshut with a square-headed cart entry, over which is a coped gable with kneelers. The openings have Tudor arched heads.	II
Shay Farm Cottage; 53.82256°N 1.79672°W	—	Early 18th century	A cottage in rendered sandstone with a stone slate roof. There are two storeys, the doorway has squared jambs, and the windows are mullioned.	II
Frizley Old Hall; 53.81852°N 1.76993°W	—	1727	The house is in sandstone with quoins, a moulded string course, a moulded eaves cornice, and a stone slate roof with coped gables. There are two storeys and a symmetrical front of three bays. The central doorway has an architrave, a frieze carved with leaves and an initialled and dated medallion, and a cornice. The windows are mullioned, the window above the doorway with two lights, and the others with four. At the rear is a mullioned and transomed stair window.	II*
Frizingley Hall; 53.81848°N 1.77010°W	—	c. 1730–50	A large sandstone house with quoins, an eaves cornice, and a stone slate roof with coped gables. There are two storeys, above the doorway is a large carved shell hood on console brackets, over this is a single-light window, and the other windows are mullioned. At the rear is a doorway with a cornice hood on carved brackets.	II*
23 and 25 Syke Road; 53.81357°N 1.78350°W		1736	A house divided into two cottages in about 1800, it is in rendered gritstone, with quoins and a stone slate roof. There are two storeys, two bays, and a rear outshut. The doorways are in the centre and have squared jambs, above them is a square panel with the date and initials, and the windows are mullioned, with some mullions missing.	II
Royds Hall Barn; 53.82127°N 1.79420°W	—	18th century	The barn is in sandstone with a stone slate roof. There are six bays, and it contains a doorway with a stone lintel.	II
Black Swan Public House; 53.81891°N 1.77048°W		Mid to late 18th century	The public house was extended to the rear in the 19th century. It is in rendered sandstone, and has a stone slate roof with saddlestones and shaped kneelers. There are two storeys, three bays, and a rear wing. In the centre of the front is a gabled stone porch, and the outer bays contain mullioned windows.	II
18 and 20 Highgate; 53.81583°N 1.78631°W	—	Late 18th century	A house (No. 18) and a shop (No. 20) in sandstone with quoins, bracketed eaves, a stone slate roof, and two storeys. The house has three bays, and in the centre is a modern porch and a doorway with squared jambs. The window above the porch has a single light, a small keystone, and moulded capping to the lintel, and the other windows are mullioned with two lights. The shop to the left has two bays, a modern shop front in the ground floor, and two two-light mullioned windows above.	II
Shay Cottage; 53.82254°N 1.79691°W	—	c. 1800–20	A sandstone cottage with s stone slate roof. There is one storey, the doorway has squared jambs, and the windows are mullioned with two lights.	II
Shay Farmhouse; 53.82272°N 1.79708°W	—	c. 1800–20	A pair of cottages combined into a house, it is in sandstone with a stone slate roof. There are two storeys, three bays, and an outshut on the left. There are two doorways with squared jambs, one blocked, the other with a gabled porch. Above the porch is a single-light window, and the other windows are mullioned.	II
72–82 Highgate; 53.81619°N 1.79006°W	—	c. 1800–30	A row of sandstone cottages stepped down a hill, with quoins, kneelers and stone slate roofs. There are two storeys, and each cottage has two bays. Some windows have a single light, some are mullioned with two or three lights, and others have been altered.	II
Swan Hill and barn 53.81892°N 1.77024°W		c. 1800–30	A row of cottages and an attached barn, they are in sandstone with bracketed eaves and a stone slate roof. There are two storeys, the south end is canted and the barn is at the north end. The doorways have squared jambs, the windows are mullioned with two lights, and in the canted end the windows and doorway are in full-height arched recesses. In the barn is a segmental-arched cart entry with voussoirs, and in the upper floor are blind triangular and oval panels.	II
1–15 and 3A Garden Terrace; 53.81334°N 1.78356°W		c. 1820–30	A terrace of sandstone cottages with stone slate roofs. They have two storeys and one or two bays. The doorways have squared jambs, and the windows are mullioned, with some mullions removed.	II
56–68 Highgate; 53.81617°N 1.78935°W	—	Early 19th century	A row of sandstone cottages with stone slate roofs. There are two storeys, and each cottage has two bays. Some windows have a single light, some are mullioned with two or three lights, and others have been altered.	II
Shipley Fields Hall; 53.82433°N 1.77431°W	—	Early 19th century	The house, which was extended later in the century, is in stone on a plinth, with rusticated quoins, a string course, a moulded eaves cornice, and a Welsh slate roof, with a coped gable on the right, and hipped on the left. There are two storeys, a symmetrical front of five bays, a two-bay extension on the left, and three bays on the sides. In the centre of the original part is an Ionic portico with a full entablature and blocking course. The doorway has a moulded architrave, the windows are sashes, and at the rear is a round-arched stair window. The middle bay in the left return projects and is pedimented.	II
67 Frizinghall Road; 53.81736°N 1.77096°W		c. 1850	A house in painted stone with quoins, overhanging eaves, and a hipped slate roof. There are two storeys and a symmetrical front of three bays. In the centre is a porch with two octagonal embattled turrets, and a parapet with a carved head. The doorway has a moulded surround, a cambered head, and carved spandrels. It is flanked by tripartite windows with pilasters and cornices on consoles. The windows in the upper floor are casements, the central one with an architrave and a pediment on consoles. Fronting the pavement is a dwarf wall.	II
Heaton Mount; 53.81724°N 1.77610°W		1864	A large house later used for other purposes, it is in stone on a plinth, with a full entablature across the ground floor, chamfered rusticated quoins, a moulded frieze, a cornice with modillion brackets, and a balustraded parapet with carved urns. There are two storeys and a half-H plan, with the central entrance bay recessed. The flanking wings have two-storey slightly canted bay windows containing arcaded windows with Corinthian pilasters. In the centre a flight of steps leads up to a porch with Corinthian columns and pilasters, and an elaborately carved and crested parapet with urns.	II
Stable and coach house, Heaton Mount; 53.81769°N 1.77712°W	—	c. 1864	The stable and coach house are in sandstone with bracketed eaves and a hipped slate roof. There are two storeys, a main range, and flanking two-bay wings. The ground floor windows have been largely altered and the windows in the upper floor have round heads. On the centre of the roof is a belvedere with round-headed windows and a pyramidal roof.	II
St Barnabas' Church; 53.81696°N 1.78427°W		1864	The north aisle was added in 1895–96. The church is built in stone, and consists of a nave, north and south aisles with separate gables, a chancel with a semicircular apse, and a southeast steeple. The steeple has an unbuttressed tower, and a broach spire. At the west end are three gables.	II
Sir Titus Salt Memorial; 53.81538°N 1.77308°W		1874	The memorial commemorates Sir Titus Salt and stands near the Keighley Road entrance to Lister Park. It was designed by Lockwood and Mawson, the sculpture is by John Adams-Acton, and the design is based on the Albert Memorial. The statue is in marble and depicts Sir Titus seated, surrounded by an ornately carved sandstone canopy in Gothic style. This stands on a tall granite plinth and contains polished granite shafts, and statuettes in niches. The memorial was moved to its present position in 1896.	II
Former Yorkshire United Independent College; 53.81646°N 1.77655°W	—	1874–77	The college, which has been used for various purposes, is in stone with slate roofs, and was designed by Lockwood and Mawson in Gothic style. There are two storeys and a near-symmetrical front with many gables and crocketed finials. The central bays project, they are flanked by turrets with pinnacles, and they contain a tripartite arcaded porch, above which is a large oriel window. To the west is a chapel wing, to the east a cross-wing, and to the north the master's house with a two-storey oriel window and a recessed tower with iron cresting.	II
Memorial Gatehouse, Lister Park; 53.81549°N 1.77295°W		1883	The gatehouse is at the Keighley Road entrance to the park, it is in sandstone, and was built to commemorate the visit of the Prince of Wales and his wife. It consists of a large pointed archway flanked by octagonal embattled turrets. Above the archway is a machicolated balcony over which is a canopied niche flanked by windows with cusped heads and moulded hood moulds. At the top is a parapet decorated with roses and Prince of Wales's feathers.	II
St Cuthbert's Church; 53.81218°N 1.78107°W		1890–91	A Roman Catholic church, it is built in stone and has Welsh slate roofs with terracotta ridge tiles. It consists of a nave with a clerestory, north and south aisles, a single-storey narthex and an octagonal baptistry at the ritual west end, a chancel with a polygonal apse, and gabled confessionals and side chapels. The west end is flanked by octagonal turrets with stone spires, and at the junction of the nave and the chancel is an octagonal turret incorporating a bellcote, and with a conical red tiled roof. Inside the church are sculptures by Eric Gill.	II*
Presbytery, St Cuthbert's Church; 53.81235°N 1.78130°W	—	1890–91	The presbytery to the northeast of the church is in stone with quoins, a Welsh slate roof, and terracotta ridge tiles. There are two storeys and a front of three bays. Steps lead up to a porch and a doorway with a pointed arch and flanked by marble columns, and above is a cross window. The left bay has a canted corner, and it contains transomed windows. To the right is a gabled bay containing a two-storey canted bay window, above this is a mullioned and transomed window, and in the gable apex is an arrow slit window.	II
Grange Leigh; 53.81707°N 1.78091°W		c. 1907–10	A sandstone house in Arts and Crafts style, with overhanging eaves and a gabled west front. There are two storeys and an attic, and the entrance with a recessed porch is on the north side. To the left of the entrance is a two-storey canted bay window with a shaped parapet and ball finials, and there is a similar bay window on the west front. The windows are mullioned, with leaded iron casements.	II
Greyholme; 53.81693°N 1.78090°W	—	c. 1907–10	A sandstone house in Arts and Crafts style, with overhanging eaves. The west front has a coped gable with short parapets carrying ball finials. In the front is a recessed porch that has a lintel with shaped panels. To the right of the porch is a two-storey canted bay window with a shaped and ramped parapet. The windows are mullioned.	II
Our Lady and the First Martyrs Church; 53.81271°N 1.80388°W		1935	A Roman Catholic church with a reinforced concrete frame, stone cladding and slate roofs. It has an octagonal plan, and a porch to the west, a vestry to the east, and a central altar. The porch is gabled and has a round-arched doorway, and behind it is a round-arched bellcote. Around the sides are small round-headed windows, and the vestry has a hipped roof. On the top is an octagonal lantern surmounted by a cupola.	II
Former Sharp's Card Factory; 53.82104°N 1.80766°W		1936	The factory has a steel frame, it is clad in sandstone, concrete and cast iron, and has a flat roof. There are four storeys and three ranges, the central range projecting with nine bays, and the outer ranges each with eleven bays. In the centre is a plinth, fluted Ionic columns supporting an entablature, and a doorway with a dated lintel. The windows are square with steel frames, and between them are decorated cast iron panels. At the top of the factory is deep fluted moulding forming a parapet.	II
