= Listed buildings in Bradford (Manningham Ward) =

Manningham is a ward in the metropolitan borough of the City of Bradford, West Yorkshire, England. It contains 76 listed buildings that are recorded in the National Heritage List for England. Of these, one is listed at Grade II*, the middle of the three grades, and the others are at Grade II, the lowest grade. The ward is to the northwest of the centre of Bradford, and is mainly residential, with some industry at the southern extremity of the ward. The listed industrial buildings are, or have been, part of the textile industry of the city. The listed residential buildings range from converted farmhouses and farm buildings, to terraces of houses and cottages, and to large villas. To the north of the ward are Bradford Grammar School, and part of Lister Park, and both contain listed buildings. The other listed buildings include churches, mosques and a synagogue, public houses, some or which have been converted for other uses, a group of almshouses and associated structures, a former police station, a hospital, schools, swimming baths, and a war memorial.

== Key ==
Grade	Criteria
II*	Particularly important buildings of more than special interest
II	Buildings of national importance and special interest

== Buildings ==
Name and location	Photograph	Date	Notes	Grade
Manningham Old Manor House; 53.80856°N 1.77263°W		Mid 17th century	The remains of the former manor house consist of part of the hall range and the north cross-wing. They are in gritstone, partly refaced in sandstone, with quoins, saddlestones on the gable ends, and shaped kneelers and shaped finials on the cross-wing. The hall range has one storey and an attic, and the cross-wing has two storeys. The windows are mullioned, some with hood moulds, or mullioned and transomed, and in the hall range is a gabled dormer with a finial.	II
8 and 9 Ashdowne Place; 53.80599°N 1.76948°W	—	Mid to late 17th century	A farmhouse, later divided into two, it is in gritstone, rendered and painted at the front, and has a stone slate roof. There are two storeys, the windows are mullioned, the doorways have squared jambs, and on No. 8 is a gabled trellis porch.	II
Clock House, Bradford Grammar School; 53.81391°N 1.76967°W	—	1699	A house that was altered in the 19th century, it is in sandstone on a plinth, with chamfered quoins, a string course, a moulded cornice, a coped parapet, and a stone slate roof with saddlestones and shaped kneelers. The parapet is arched in the centre and contains an oculus, under which is a re-set sundial. There are two storeys and a front of five bays. The central doorway, which is blocked, has moulded jambs, and a frieze carved with a head, above which is an initialled datestone. The windows on the front are sashes, and in the gable ends are mullioned windows with hood moulds.	II
11, 13 and 15 Skinner Lane; 53.80701°N 1.77307°W	—	Early to mid 18th century	A farmhouse later divided into three cottages, it is in gritstone with quoins, and a stone slate roof with saddlestones and kneelers. There are two storeys, and the windows are mullioned with two, three or four lights. The doorways have squared jambs, and there is a blocked window in the upper floor.	II
Gate piers, 6 East Squire Lane; 53.80577°N 1.76909°W	—	Late 18th century	The gate piers were originally columns in Bradford Buttermarket and were moved to the present site when it was demolished in 1812. They consist of two monolith shafts.	II
Stable and coach house, Bradford Grammar School; 53.81398°N 1.76988°W	—	1783	The stable and coach house range are in sandstone with a stone slate roof. In the south front is a projecting part with a pedimented gable, and in a gable end are initials and the date.	II
5, 6 and 7 East Squire Lane; 53.80588°N 1.76915°W	—	c. 1800	A pair of sandstone cottages with a stone slate roof. There are two storeys and two bays. The doorways in the outer parts have squared jambs, and the windows are mullioned, with two or three lights.	II
North Lodge, Bradford Grammar School; 53.81420°N 1.77109°W		c. 1800	The lodge at the entrance to the grounds of the school is in sandstone with a hipped stone slate roof. There is one storey, the north end is canted and contains a doorway with a four-centred arched head. In the corner, and in the two bays along the side, are two-light mullioned windows, with four-centred arched lights, and hood moulds.	II
96–106, 110, 114, 116 and 118 Church Street; 53.80604°N 1.77521°W	—	c. 1820–30	A terrace of cottages stepped up a street, they are in sandstone with stone slate roofs. There are two storeys, and each cottage has two bays. The doorways have squared jambs, some windows have single lights, and the other windows are mullioned with two lights, and some mullions have been removed.	II
30–40 Cross Road; 53.80465°N 1.77698°W		c. 1820–30	A row of sandstone cottages with a sill band, bracketed eaves, and stone slate roofs. There are two storeys, the doorways have squared jambs, and the windows are mullioned with two lights.	II
Former Spotted House Public House; 53.81144°N 1.76756°W	—	Early 19th century	The former public house, later used for other purposes, is in sandstone with stone slate roofs. There are two ranges, down a slope. The upper range on the left has two storeys and three bays, and contains blocked windows. The gable end faces the road and has bracketed eaves. The right range has one storey and a basement, and four bays, and contains inserted windows.	II
1 and 3 Lilycroft Place, wall, gates and outbuildings 53.80667°N 1.77593°W	—	c. 1828	A farmhouse later altered and divided, it is in sandstone, partly rendered, with a dentil cornice, and a stone slate roof. There are two storeys, an L-shaped plan, a front of four bays, and a rear lean-to. On the front is a porch, the doors are modern, and most of the windows are casements. In the rear yard is a range of single-storey flat-roofed outbuildings. The area is enclosed by a sandstone wall with rounded copings, containing gate piers with rounded heads, and wrought iron gates.	II
The Manor House; 53.80842°N 1.77277°W	—	c. 1830	A sandstone house rebuilt from outbuildings of the Old Manor House. It has a plinth, quoins, a moulded eaves cornice on modillion brackets, and a hipped slate roof. There are two storeys, a symmetrical front of three bays, and a rear wing incorporating earlier outbuildings. The central doorway has a rectangular fanlight, a cornice on scrolled consoles, and a reeded blocking course with quatrefoil corner blocks. The windows on the front are sashes, and the rear wing has a gable with saddlestones, and a four-light mullioned window.	II
19 and 21 Spring Gardens; 53.80088°N 1.75807°W	—	c. 1830–40	A pair of mirror-image houses in sandstone, with horizontal grooving in the ground floor, a plat band, a frieze, a projecting eaves cornice, and a stone slate roof. There are two storeys and four bays. In the centre is a round-headed passage entry flanked by the doorways, which have Tuscan pilasters, and an overall entablature and cornice. The windows are sashes, those in the upper floor with architraves and shallow aprons.	II
Wilton House; 53.80095°N 1.75790°W	—	c. 1830–40	A sandstone house with a sill band, an eaves cornice, and a stone slate roof. There are two storeys and three bays. The central doorway has engaged Doric columns, a fanlight, an entablature and a projecting cornice, and to its right is a canted bay window.	II
1–11 Belle Vue and 191, 193, 195 and 197 Manningham Lane; 53.80382°N 1.76295°W		c. 1840	A terrace of gritstone houses, stepped in pairs, with banded rustication in the ground floor, plat bands, and moulded eaves cornices. They have three storeys, most have two bays, and all have rear gabled wings. The doorways have fanlights, double Tuscan pilasters, and entablatures. Alternate houses have triangular pediments. The windows are sashes, those in the middle floor with architraves. No. 11 has three bays, and contains an arched doorway with a semicircular fanlight and imposts, and a canted bay window. The surviving gate piers have chamfered corners and lobed and domed caps.	II
36–48 Heaton Road; 53.80747°N 1.77632°W	—	c. 1840	A terrace of seven sandstone cottages with bracketed eaves and stone slate roofs. There are two storeys, the doorways have squared jambs, some of the windows have single lights, some are mullioned with two lights, and some mullions have been removed.	II
10, 11 and 12 Ashdowne Place; 53.80607°N 1.76934°W	—	c. 1840–50	A group of three cottages in rendered sandstone with bracketed eaves, and a stone slate roof with coped gables. There are two storeys and an attic, and four bays. The doorways have squared jambs, the windows are sashes, and in the gable end is a round-headed window.	II
1–36 Southfield Square; 53.80347°N 1.76687°W		c. 1840–50	A terrace of gritstone houses, stepped in pairs, with friezes, moulded gutter cornices, and slate roofs. There are two storeys, and each house has two bays. The doorways have rectangular fanlights and pediments on fluted console brackets. No. 1 has a bowed corner and one bay on Lumb Lane, and it contains a shop front.	II
37–45 Southfield Square; 53.80342°N 1.76898°W	—	c. 1840–50	A terrace of gritstone houses, with friezes, moulded gutter cornices, and slate roofs. There are two storeys, and each house has two bays. There are two storeys, and each house has two bays. The doorways of Nos. 44 and 45 have rectangular fanlights, Doric pilasters, entablatures and blocking courses. The other doorways have rectangular fanlights and pediments on fluted console brackets.	II
46, 47 and 48 Southfield Square; 53.80371°N 1.76908°W	—	c. 1840–50	A row of three stone houses in a terrace with an eaves cornice. There are two storeys, and each house has two bays. Steps lead up to the doorways in the right bays, which have segmental heads, fanlights, architraves, keystones, and cornices. The windows in the upper floor are round-headed, single above the doorway and paired in the left bay. The ground floor windows are tripartite with segmental-headed lights, keystones, and cornices.	II
51–75 Southfield Square; 53.80401°N 1.76741°W		c. 1840–50	A terrace of stone houses with an eaves cornice, some houses also with modillioned brackets. There are two storeys, and most houses have two bays. The windows are sashes, some of which are tripartite. The doorways have pilasters and otherwise vary; some are round-headed with semicircular fanlights, imposts and projecting cornices on console brackets, and others are flat-headed with rectangular fanlights and plain cornices.	II
Church of St Paul and St Jude; 53.80689°N 1.77230°W		1846–48	A stone church in Early English style, it has a cruciform plan consisting of a nave, a south porch, north and south transepts, a chancel, and a steeple at the crossing. The steeple has a tower with stepped clasping buttresses, and an octagonal broach spire with two tiers of lucarnes. At the west end are three lancet windows over which is a rose window.	II
7–17 Hanover Square; 53.80031°N 1.76051°W	—	c. 1850	A row of eleven houses, stepped in pairs, at the end of a terrace, and at the entrance to the square. They are in gritstone with slate roofs, there are two storeys, and each house has two bays. The doorways have cornices on console brackets.	II
18–51 Hanover Square; 53.80006°N 1.76245°W		c. 1850	A terrace of houses at the west end of a tapering square that is curved on the corners, they are in gritstone with a sill band, a frieze, an eaves cornice, and a shallow mansard roof in stone slate. There are two storeys and attics, some houses are gabled, and the others have dormers with friezes and cornices. The other windows are round-headed, and are single, paired or tripartite. The doorways have semicircular fanlights, and cornice hoods on shaped consoles.	II
52–56 Hanover Square; 53.80056°N 1.76109°W	—	c. 1850	A row of five houses at the end of a terrace and at the entrance to the square. They are in gritstone with slate roofs, there are two storeys, and each house has two bays. The doorways have cornices on console brackets.	II
163 and 165 Lumb Lane; 53.80356°N 1.76551°W	—	c. 1850	A pair of houses with shops, they are in sandstone with a shallow frieze, a moulded gutter cornice, and a slate roof. There are two storeys, No. 163 has three bays, and No. 165 has two. In the left bay is an archway, both parts have a shop front, that of No. 165 with pilasters, consoles, and a fascia. In each shop is a doorway with a pediment on scrolled consoles.	II
286 Manningham Lane; 53.80708°N 1.76514°W	—	c. 1850	A large house on a corner site, it is in stone with a frieze, a cornice, a blocking course, and a hipped slate roof. There are two storeys, a symmetrical front of three bays and a two-bay extension on the left. The doorway has a porch with Ionic columns, and is flanked by two-storey canted bay windows. The window above the porch has a plain surround and a cornice.	II
2 and 4 Spring Bank Place; 53.80631°N 1.76441°W	—	c. 1850–55	A pair of sandstone houses on a plinth, with string courses, and Welsh slate roofs that have moulded coping, kneelers and finials. There are two storeys, basements and attics, and a front of five bays, the outer bays projecting and gabled, and with a smaller gable over the middle bay. The outer bays have canted bay windows and round-headed windows in the attic, and most of the other windows are mullioned and transomed. The doorways have pointed arches, chamfered surrounds and hood moulds.	II
Bolton Royd; 53.80772°N 1.76531°W		c. 1850–55	A large stone house with sill bands, a frieze, a cornice and blocking course, and a hipped slate roof. There are two storeys, five bays, and a later two-bay wing on the left. In the centre is a porch with Greek Doric columns and an elaborate wrought iron balcony. In the outer bays are full-height rectangular bay windows with pilasters and a Doric entablature. The wing has a steep mansard roof.	II
6 and 8 Spring Bank Place; 53.80650°N 1.76397°W	—	c. 1850–60	A pair of sandstone houses in Italianate style with a slate roof. There are two storeys and six bays. The outer bays project and have pedimented gables over a moulded frieze and consoles. In the ground floor are canted bay windows, and towards the middle are round-arched doorways with pilasters, fanlights and keystones. Inside these are paired round-headed windows, and overall these are cornices on consoles.	II
Parkfield House; 53.80792°N 1.76397°W	—	c. 1850–60	A stone house on a plinth, with chamfered quoins, a string course, a moulded frieze, a bracketed cornice and blocking course, and a hipped slate roof. There are two storeys and a symmetrical front of three bays, the outer bays projecting slightly. The central porch has Doric pilasters and columns and an entablature. This is flanked by tripartite bow windows with pilasters and an entablature, and in the upper floor are sash windows.	II
1–23 Aspley Crescent and 27 and 29 Marlborough Road; 53.80516°N 1.76685°W		1854–55	A terrace of stone houses in a shallow curve, with sill bands, moulded friezes, gutter cornices on console brackets, and slate roofs. There are two storeys and basements, most houses have three bays, and the houses on Marlborough Road have four bays. The doorways are round-headed, with semicircular fanlights, pilasters, keystones, and impost blocks on consoles carrying pediments, and the windows are sashes.	II
49 and 50 Southfield Square; 53.80385°N 1.76912°W	—	c. 1855	A pair of sandstone houses at the end of a terrace, each on a plinth, with a string course, an eaves cornice, and a slate roof. There are two storeys, and each house has two bays. The doorways are in the right bay, they are round-headed, and each has an architrave, a vermiculated keystone, a frieze, and a cornice. The windows are sashes, tripartite in the ground floor.	II
8 Clifton Villas; 53.80629°N 1.76173°W	—	c. 1855–60	A sandstone house with quoins, a string course, and slate roofs with gables, saddlestones, kneelers, and finials. There are two storeys and attics, and three bays, the outer bays projecting and gabled. The windows are mullioned and transomed, and there are slit windows in the attics. Flanking the central doorway are canted bay windows.	II
Clifton House; 53.80586°N 1.76323°W	—	c. 1855–60	A large house in sandstone on a plinth, with chamfered quoins, a sill band, modillion brackets to the moulded eaves, and a hipped slate roof. There are two storeys, three bays on the front, the middle bay recessed, and sides of five bays. The central porch has double Doric columns, an entablature with consoles, and a cornice, above which is a balustrade. Flanking the porch are canted bay windows with pilasters, and in the upper floor are windows with architraves and aprons. On the west front the upper floor windows have balconettes, and on the east side is a link to a single-storey billiards room.	II
1–5 Spring Bank Place and 384 Manningham Lane; 53.80672°N 1.76471°W		c. 1855–60	A group of houses in sandstone with Italianate features. They have a plinth, a plat band, a moulded frieze, eaves on flat brackets, and a hipped slate roof. There are two storeys, a symmetrical front of five bays, the outer bays projecting, and returns of three bays. The central doorway has an architrave and a cornice on consoles. The windows are sashes, those in the upper floor of the middle bays with balconettes. In the outer bays are canted bay windows. The returns contain central porches with pilasters and deep entablatures.	II
3 Clifton Villas; 53.80615°N 1.76380°W	—	c. 1860	A sandstone house on a plinth, with quoins, a sill band, flat eaves, and a hipped slate roof. There are two storeys and a front of three bays, the middle bay narrow and recessed. The central doorway has pilasters and an entablature, and it is flanked by canted bay windows. In the upper floor, the windows have aprons.	II
4 Clifton Villas; 53.80604°N 1.76263°W	—	c. 1860	A sandstone house on a plinth, with a sill band, a shallow frieze, a bracketed eaves cornice, and a hipped slate roof. There are two storeys and three bays, the right bay projecting, and the left recessed and containing the entrance. In the right bay is a canted bay window, the left bay contains a tripartite window, and in the top floor the windows have panelled aprons.	II
5 Clifton Villas; 53.80630°N 1.76336°W		c. 1860	A sandstone house with a sill band, a bracketed eaves cornice, and a hipped slate roof. There are two storeys and three bays, and a single-storey extension on the right. In the middle bay is a porch with fluted columns on pedestals, and over it is a balustrade. The left bay projects and contains a two-storey canted bay window under a separate hipped roof. The right bay contains a two-storey rectangular bay window with tripartite windows, and in the extension is a single-storey canted bay window.	II
7 Clifton Villas; 53.80642°N 1.76308°W	—	c. 1860	A sandstone house with bracketed eaves and a hipped slate roof. There are two storeys and three bays, the left bay projecting. In the upper floor and in the ground floor of the right bay the windows are paired. In the left bay, and in the right return, are five-light bow windows, the lights separated by pilasters, over each of which is a moulded frieze and a cornice.	II
280 Manningham Lane and 1 Clifton Villas; 53.80601°N 1.76421°W		c. 1860	A pair of houses on a corner site at right angles to each other, one later used as offices. They are in sandstone on a plinth, with quoins, a plat band, a moulded string course to the eaves, and a hipped slate roof. Both houses have two storeys and a symmetrical front of three bays. No. 1 Clifton Villas has a doorway with an architrave and a deep cornice on scrolled console brackets, flanked by canted bay windows. The doorway of No. 280 Manningham Lane has pilasters and a cornice on modillion brackets, and the flanking windows are tripartite with pilasters and an entablature with a patterned frieze.	II
Camden Terrace; 53.80350°N 1.76412°W	—	c. 1860	A terrace of sandstone houses with chamfered rusticated quoins, a frieze, a bracketed eaves cornice, and a hipped slate roof. There are two storeys and most houses have two bays. The doorways have stilted arches, panelled pilasters and keystones. The windows in the upper floor are paired sashes, and in the ground floor is a mix of tripartite windows and canted bay windows.	II
Former City Public House; 53.79840°N 1.77157°W		c. 1860	The former public house is in stone, the ground floor grooved, the upper floor rendered, with a moulded frieze, a moulded eaves cornice, and a slate roof. There are two storeys and an attic, and six bays. The ground floor windows and the doorway have segmental heads, the windows in the upper floor have round-arched heads and an impost band, and in the attic are three gabled dormers.	II
Engine house and chimney, Drummond's Mill; 53.80025°N 1.76430°W	—	1861	The mill was designed by Lockwood and Mawson, and most of it has been demolished. The engine house remains, it is in sandstone with a stone slate roof. There are three storeys, and it contains flat arched windows. At the east end is the chimney stack which is tall, slender and octagonal. It has a square plinth, and at the top the crown has console brackets.	II
Gatehouse and front block, former Oakwood Dye Works; 53.79844°N 1.77193°W		1861	The building is in sandstone, and to the left of the gateway is a four-storey Italianate tower, with a plinth, quoins, a string course, and a pyramidal roof. The entrance on its right has a semicircular arch with voussoirs. To the right of this is a three-storey ten-bay block with a rusticated ground floor, rusticated quoins, bands, panelled pilasters, and a parapet.	II
1–8 Mount Royd; 53.80879°N 1.76637°W		1863–64	A row of four semi-detached houses designed by Lockwood and Mawson in High Victorian Gothic style. They are in sandstone, with two storeys, attics and basements, and each pair of houses is symmetrical, with two gabled bays. The outer bays project and are taller, each containing a two-storey canted bay window with a pierced quatrefoil parapet. In the attic is a pair of round-headed French windows, and the bargeboards are curly and pierced. In the inner bay, steps with ornate cast iron railings lead up to a round-arched doorway, and the windows are also round-arched, those in the attic being dormers. Above the ground floor is an ornate cast iron balcony.	II
265–283 Manningham Lane and 2 Blenheim Road; 53.80747°N 1.76692°W	—	1865	A terrace of eleven houses in Italianate style with a dentilled eaves cornice and Welsh slate roofs. There are two storeys, most houses have two bays, and those at the ends and middle have three. Steps lead up to round-arched doorways that have architraves with keystones, decorated spandrels, and cornices on console brackets. In the ground floor of each house is a canted bay window, above which is a tripartite window with round-headed lights. The window above the doorway has two lights and a cornice, and in the top floor the windows have segmental heads. The houses at the ends have two gables and contain two-storey bay windows. The central bay also contains a two-storey bay window, above which is a segmental pediment.	II
Former Brick Lane Mills; 53.79845°N 1.77309°W	—	1865	The former textile mill is in sandstone. Stretching along the road is a block with three storeys and 15 bays, containing a doorway with a block pediment. On the right and projecting is a single-storey office range with six bays and a hipped slate roof. It has a plinth, and windows with stilted segmental arched heads, linked by an impost band.	II
Buildings at Whetley Mills; 53.79879°N 1.77788°W		1865	The mill buildings are in sandstone with slate roofs. There are two large parallel blocks, one by the road with five storeys, and the other at the rear with six. The lower ground floor is rusticated, the windows in the ground floor have round heads, and those above have flat heads. The gable ends are coped and contain oculi. The rear block has stair turrets, and between the blocks is an octagonal chimney. To the right of the entrance gates is a lodge, and a recessed two-storey office block with segmental-arched windows, an impost string course, and a bracketed eaves cornice.	II
Bradford Tradesmen's Homes and Chapel; 53.80635°N 1.77816°W	—	1867	A group of almshouses, with the south range added in 1878, they are arranged around four sides of a rectangular green. The houses are in sandstone with Welsh slate roofs and decorative ridge tiles. Each house has a single storey and attics containing half-dormers in hipped gables, and one bay. The doorways have chamfered surrounds, pointed arches, and fanlights, and the windows have shaped stepped heads. In the centre of the north range is a chapel with a clock turret.	II
Lamp standards, Chapel of Bradford Tradesmen's Homes; 53.80657°N 1.77849°W	—	c. 1867	Flanking the steps from the central green to the chapel are two iron lamp standards. They are in a Gothic style, and the cross arms are in the form of chameleons.	II
Oakhurst; 53.80999°N 1.76496°W	—	1860s–1870s	A large house in sandstone with a string course and a slate roof. There are two storeys, a basement and an attic, and an irregular plan. At the front are three bays, the left and middle bays projecting. The left bay has a gable with a bargeboard incorporating a carved Star of David, and contains a two-storey canted bay window. The middle bay forms a tower, and contains a doorway with a fanlight, a Gothic arched head and side lights, between which are Composite columns. At the top is a parapet with projecting carved dragons. In the right bay are two small gabled dormers. Other features include a bow window, and a semi-octagonal projection with an embattled parapet. Most of the windows are sashes.	II
Former Belle Vue Public House; 53.80323°N 1.76194°W		c. 1870–80	The public house on a corner site, later used for other purposes, is in sandstone with a slate mansard roof. There are two storeys and attics, and in the corner is a circular tower with a balustered balcony between the floors, and a conical roof. The porch has florid Composite columns, to the right is a two-storey canted bay window, and in the attic are dormers.	II
Former St Paul's School and school houses 53.80658°N 1.76991°W		c. 1870–80	The school and school houses are in sandstone with slate roofs. The school has two storeys and consists of a main range and two gabled cross-wings, the right longer. In the angle is a tower porch with steps leading up to a doorway with a pointed arch. The tower has three stages, above the doorway are lancet windows, an octagonal bell stage, and a small spire with a machicolated base. The pair of houses have two storeys and each house has two bays, the inner bays projecting, gabled, and containing a canted bay window. The left house also has a basement, and a porch in the angle.	II
Lister Memorial; 53.81027°N 1.76853°W		1875	The memorial to the industrialist Samuel Lister is in Lister Park, and is by Matthew Noble. It consists of a marble statue of Lister standing on a granite base. On the sides of the base are bronze reliefs with depictions relating to his industrial career.	II
St Mary Magdalene's Church; 53.80075°N 1.76649°W		1876–78	The church is in sandstone with a slate roof, and consists of a nave and a chancel with a clerestory, and north and south aisles. At the west end are two flanking entrances with arched doorways, buttresses, and two pairs of lancet windows over which is a circular window. On the gable apex is a bellcote with a pyramidal roof.	II
34 Bavaria Place; 53.80509°N 1.77579°W		1877	A former police station on a corner site, it is in sandstone with a green slate roof, and is in ornate Gothic style. It has two storeys, gables on both fronts, mullioned windows, and on the corner is a round tower with cornices and a conical roof.	II
Warden's House, Bradford Tradesmen's Homes; 53.80658°N 1.77745°W	—	1877	The warden's house by the east entrance to the grounds is in sandstone, with two storeys and an attic. In the ground floor is a canted bay window, and the other windows are mullioned.	II
Former St John's Church; 53.81156°N 1.77911°W		1878–79	The church is in sandstone with a slate roof, and it consists of a nave, north and south aisles, a chancel, and a southwest steeple. The steeple has a tower with shallow buttresses, a parapet with pinnacles, and flying buttresses to a tall spire with lucarnes. There is a large west window and a tall northwest pinnacle.	II
Balustrade and steps, Mount Royd; 53.80857°N 1.76622°W	—	c. 1880	The balustrade is in stone, and is on the west, then the south, side of the road, and also flanks the broad flight of steps leading into the private gardens. It is in stone with long sections, and has a cusped "V" pattern.	II
Former St Luke's Church; 53.81042°N 1.77651°W		1880–81	The church is in ironstone and sandstone, and is in Perpendicular style with Arts and Crafts features. It consists of a nave and chancel with a clerestory, north and south aisles, cross bays and transepts, and an almost detached northeast tower. The tower has an arched doorway with a crocketed pinnacle, over which is a canopied niche containing a statue of St Luke. The bell stage is octagonal and has an embattled parapet with pinnacles and lucarnes, and is surmounted by a short slated spire.	II
Former St Luke's Sunday School; 53.81013°N 1.77642°W		c. 1881	The Sunday school, later a mosque, is in sandstone with its gable end facing the road. It has broad windows containing freely-handled Perpendicular tracery.	II
Bradford Reform Synagogue; 53.80107°N 1.76243°W		1881	The synagogue is in Islam Revival style, it is built with bands of red and yellow sandstone, and has a slate roof. The synagogue has a chamfered plinth, bracketed eaves, and roof cresting with a central inscribed panel. There are six bays. In the right bay is a doorway with a lobed horseshoe arch on columns, with an inscription and carving in the spandrels. Above it is a pierced arcade, and two small ogee-arched windows. In the left bay is a smaller doorway with an ogee arch, and above it is a window with an eight-pointed star. The other bays contain two-light lancet windows with multi-lobed rosettes and ogee-shaped hood moulds.	II*
Main block, Bradford Children's Hospital; 53.80823°N 1.77090°W		1885	The hospital, which was extended in about 1900, is in sandstone with quoin pilasters, string courses, and a slate roof. The original part has two storeys, a basement, and a two-tier attic. In the centre is a recessed porch over which is a dated panel. On the front are canted bay windows with parapets, windows with carved pediments and scrolled aprons, and in the attic are dormers. The extension to the left has a wing with an ogee-domed stair tower linking to a circular ward and operating theatre.	II
Former Bradford Board School; 53.80359°N 1.76217°W		1895	The school is in sandstone and has a rusticated ground floor. There are three storeys and five bays, all gabled. The outer and middle bays project, the outer bays have larger gables, and the gable of the middle bay is shaped. Between the gables are octagonal turrets; these and the gables have ball finials. The central entrance has double columns and a broken entablature. The ground floor windows have semicircular-arched heads, most of the other windows are mullioned and transomed, and in the outer gables are lunettes.	II
Cartwright Hall; 53.81211°N 1.77163°W		1900–04	A museum and art gallery in Lister Park, it is stone, and in Neo-Baroque style. The front is symmetrical with seven bays and a rusticated base. The middle bay has two storeys, and contains a porte-cochère with engaged Roman Ionic columns, a semicircular arch over which is a Venetian aedicule balcony, a broken entablature, and an open pediment. Over this is an elaborate cupola with statues at the corners of the base. At the rear is an apse flanked by domed turrets.	II
Caretaker's cottage, Green Lane School; 53.80152°N 1.76689°W	—	1902	The cottage is in stone, and has a slate roof with coped gables and kneelers. There are two storeys and an attic, and two bays. The doorway has a chamfered surround and a fanlight, some of the windows are single-light casements, and others are mullioned with two lights.	II
Clinic, Green Lane School; 53.80235°N 1.76721°W		1902	The building, later a nursery school, is in stone on a plinth, with quoins, sill bands, chamfered eaves, and a slate roof with coped gables and kneelers. There is one storey and seven bays, the middle three bays projecting under a gable, containing a canted bay window and side lights. In the outer bays are round-arched doorways with chamfered surrounds and hood moulds.	II
Main School, Water Tower and Railings, Green Lane School; 53.80231°N 1.76654°W		1902	The school is in sandstone, and it has slate roofs with coped gables and kneelers. Facing the road are three large gabled bays, and recessed to the right is the entrance bay with a pyramidal roof. The school consists of blocks with one or two storeys, and there is a large square water tower with a projecting cornice and parapet at the top. Along the northern boundary of the grounds is a low wall with spearhead railings and five sets of gabled gate piers.	II
Manningham Baths; 53.80447°N 1.77400°W		1903	The swimming baths are in stone with slate roofs. At the entrance is a two-storey bay flanked by recessed single-storey wings. The middle bay contains a canted bay window with a parapet, and above are three single lights, and a circular window in the gable, which is semicircular with steps. In the wings, the roof sweeps down over a doorway. Behind the entrance is a reception area, a swimming pool, changing cubicles, a sauna, a boiler room, and a water tower.	II
Lodge, gates and gate piers at the Oak Lane entrance to Lister Park; 53.80944°N 1.76810°W		1903–04	The lodge is in sandstone, and has gables with bargeboards. There are five gate piers that are rusticated with bracketed cornice caps, the outer ones with ball finials, and the central one with iron cresting. There are two carriage gates and two pedestrian gates, all ornate and in wrought iron.	II
Gates and gate piers at the North Park Road entrance to Lister Park; 53.81093°N 1.77106°W		1904	The gate piers flanking the gates at the North Park Road entrance are in stone with quoins and cornices and surmounted by large urns. The carriage and pedestrian gates are ornate, and in wrought iron.	II
Kitchen, Swimming Pool and Gymnasium, Green Lane School; 53.80173°N 1.76614°W	—	1904	The buildings are in stone and have slate roofs with coped gables and kneelers. They form a group of blocks with wings, and contain a variety of windows, including sashes, mullioned windows, and casements.	II
Former Carlisle Business Centre; 53.80569°N 1.77094°W		1905	The building is in sandstone, with a rusticated plinth, long and short quoins, a bracketed cornice, a parapet, and a Welsh slate roof. There are two storeys and a symmetrical front of eleven bays, the outer bays projecting. In the centre is a portal with rusticated Ionic pilasters, and an open segmental pediment. The windows have architraves, and those in the ground floor of the outer bays have large keystones and open pediments. In the centre of the roof is a clock turret and cupola with Doric columns.	II
Manningham War Memorial; 53.81067°N 1.77642°W		c. 1921	The war memorial is on a corner near crossroads in a semicircular recess in the churchyard wall of St Luke's Church. It is in sandstone, and has a semi-octagonal three-stepped base, a chamfered square plinth, and is surmounted by a Latin cross carrying a reversed bronze sword. There are inscriptions on the plinth, and on the capstones of the surrounding wall.	II
