= Heaton, West Yorkshire =

Coordinates: 53.817°N 1.784°W

Heaton
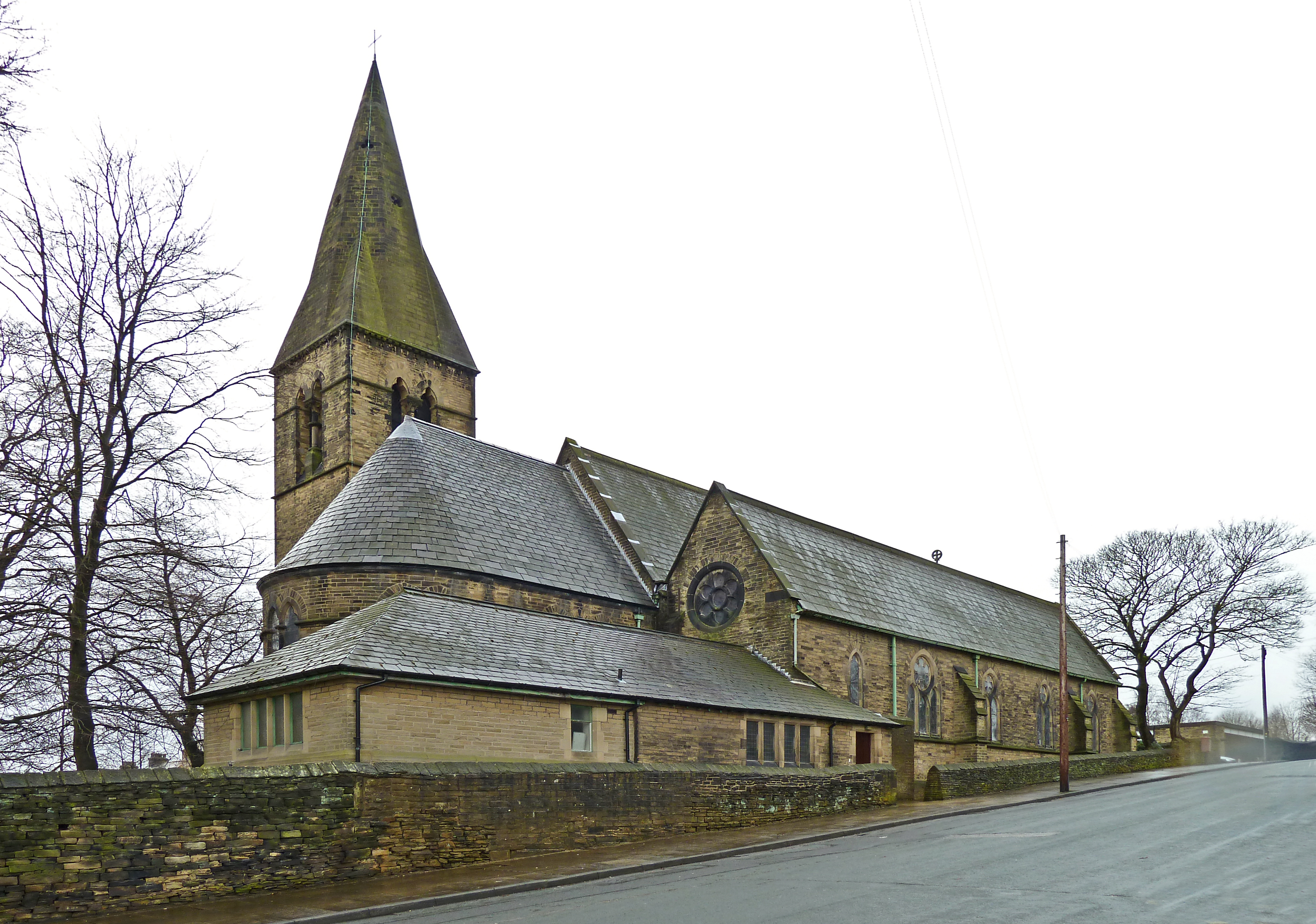
- St Barnabas Church

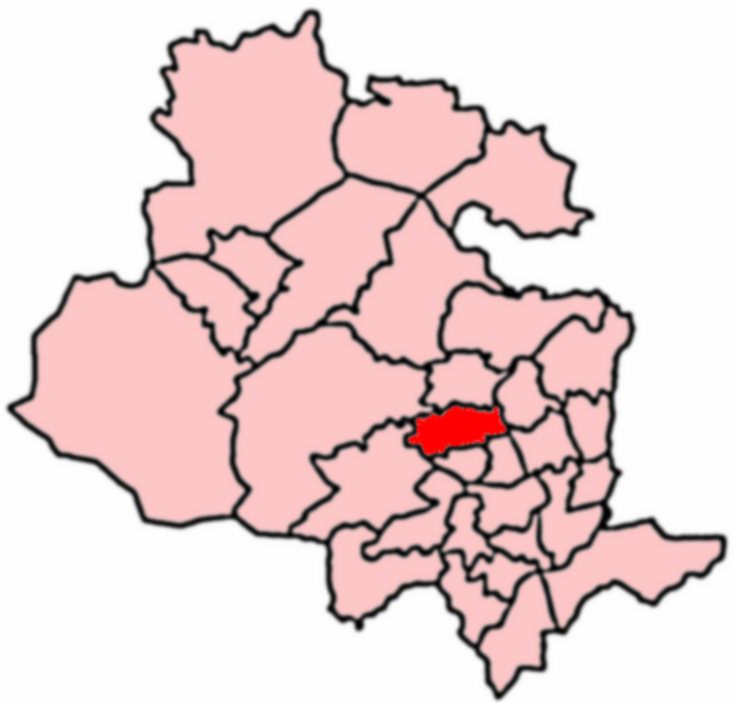
- 2004 Boundaries of Heaton Rural Ward

- Location within West Yorkshire
- Population: 17,121 (ward 2011 census)
- Metropolitan borough: City of Bradford
- Metropolitan county: West Yorkshire
- Region: Yorkshire and the Humber
- Country: England
- Sovereign state: United Kingdom
- Post town: BRADFORD
- Postcode district: BD9, BD18
- Dialling code: 01274
- Police: West Yorkshire
- Fire: West Yorkshire
- Ambulance: Yorkshire
- UK Parliament: Bradford West
- Councillors: Nusrat Mohammed (Labour); Mohammed Amran (Labour); Mohammad Shabbir (Labour)

Heaton is an area of Bradford and ward within the City of Bradford Metropolitan District Council, West Yorkshire, England. The population at the 2001 census was 16,913, which had increased to 17,121 at the 2011 Census. Historically part of the West Riding of Yorkshire, the ward includes the villages of Frizinghall, Heaton and Daisy Hill, extending to Chellow Heights Reservoir on the western edge and the Bradford-Shipley railway line on the eastern edge. Frizinghall railway station is on the edge of the ward. Located in Heaton is the former St Bede's Grammar School (now St Bede's and St Joseph's Catholic College Ardor Site) and Bradford Grammar School. The official residence of the Bishop of Bradford is also in Heaton. Heaton has a range of shops and restaurants. An ancient woodland, Heaton Woods, stretches from the village to Shipley. The ward is home to 5 golf courses.

J. B. Priestley grew up in Heaton and John Braine attended St. Bede's Grammar School. The area became infamous in 1981 when Peter Sutcliffe, the "Yorkshire Ripper", who lived at 6 Garden Lane, was arrested.

Heaton is one of the few remaining places in England to have a Lord of the manor. The title was until 2012 held by John Stanley King who purchased the title in the 1960s from the estate of the Earl of Rosse to ensure the ancient title remained live. He lived in the village all his life and was a local historian. The title is now held by his nephew, Christopher Ball.

== Councillors ==
Heaton electoral ward is represented on Bradford Council by three Labour Party councillors, Nusrat Mohammed, Mohammed Amran and Mohammad Shabbir.

Election	Councillor	Councillor	Councillor
2004	Mohammad Masood (Con)	David Michael Ford (Green)	John Stanley King (Con)
2006	Mohammad Masood (Con)	David Ford (Green)	John King (Con)
2007	Mohammad Masood (Con)	Rizwan Malik (Lab)	John King (Con)
2008	Mohammad Masood (Con)	Rizwan Malik (Lab)	Sajid Akhtar (Con)
2010	Imdad Hussain (Lab)	Rizwan Malik (Lab)	Sajid Akhtar (Con)
2011	Imdad Hussain (Lab)	Rizwan Malik (Lab)	Sajid Akhtar (Con)
2012	Imdad Hussain (Lab)	Rizwan Malik (Lab)	Mohammad Shabbir (Respect)
October 2013	Imdad Hussain (Lab)	Rizwan Malik (Lab)	Mohammad Shabbir (Ind)
2014	Nusrat Mohammed (Lab)	Rizwan Malik (Lab)	Mohammad Shabbir (Ind)
April 2015	Nusrat Mohammed (Lab)	Rizwan Malik (Lab)	Mohammad Shabbir (Lab)
May 2015	Nusrat Mohammed (Lab)	Mohammed Amran (Lab)	Mohammad Shabbir (Lab)
2016	Nusrat Mohammed (Lab)	Mohammed Amran (Lab)	Mohammad Shabbir (Lab)

indicates seat up for re-election. indicates councillor defection.

== History ==
Heaton was formerly a chapelry in the parish of Bradford, in 1866 Heaton became a separate civil parish, on 25 March 1898 the parish was abolished and merged with Bradford. In 1891 the parish had a population of 4073.

== See also ==
- Listed buildings in Bradford (Heaton Ward)
