= Frizinghall =

District of Bradford, West Yorkshire, England

Coordinates: 53.8204°N 1.7691°W

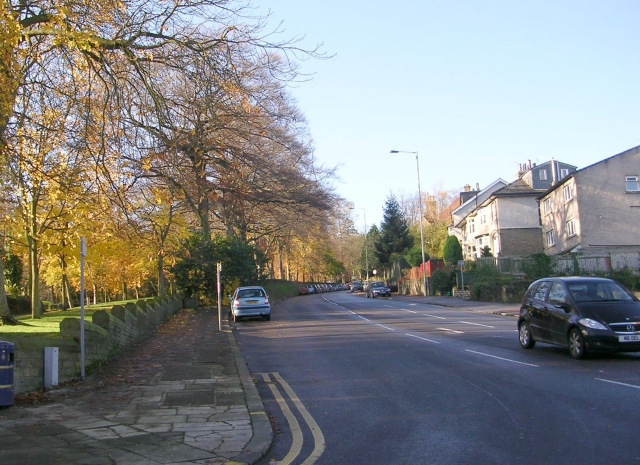
Looking west up Emm Lane from the A650 (Keighley Road)

Frizinghall is a district in the Heaton ward of the City of Bradford, West Yorkshire, lying 2 miles (3 km) north of the city centre close to the town of Shipley, itself a part of the City of Bradford Metropolitan District along with such other nearby towns as Keighley and Ilkley.

Frizinghall derives its name from a type of rough woollen cloth made in the area (frieze), and the hall was somewhere in the settlement (ing) where the frieze was made. Others believe the name comes from Old English; The Frisian's nook of land (Frisian being a personal name) or from Furze-covered Haugh (haugh being an enclosure).

Frizinghall railway station is on the Airedale line which has frequent services to Bradford Forster Square, Leeds, Shipley, Ilkley, Keighley and Skipton.

The fictitious town of Frizinghall in Wilkie Collins' book The Moonstone is near the Yorkshire coast.

== See also ==
- Listed buildings in Bradford (Heaton Ward)
