= Listed buildings in Airmyn =

Airmyn is a civil parish in the county of the East Riding of Yorkshire, England. It contains six listed buildings that are recorded in the National Heritage List for England. All the listed buildings are designated at Grade II, the lowest of the three grades, which is applied to "buildings of national importance and special interest". The parish contains the village of Airmyn and the surrounding area. All the listed buildings are in the village, and consist of a church, houses, a school and a clock tower.

== Buildings ==
Name and location	Photograph	Date	Notes
St David's Church; 53.71782°N 0.90164°W		1676	The church, which has been extended and altered, including a remodelling in 1858 by Lockwood and Mawson. It is built in red brick with stone dressings and a Westmorland slate roof. It consists of a nave with a west porch, a north vestry, and a chancel with a south organ chamber. On the west front, the porch is flanked by lancet windows, and above is a tablet with the date and a coat of arms. The gable is surmounted by a bellcote with two pointed bell openings, and a pierced quatrefoil under a coped gable with a pinnacle.
Sweet Echoes; 53.71786°N 0.90316°W		c. 1700	The house, which has been divided, is in brick on a mainly rendered plinth, with a floor band, a modillion eaves cornice, and a pantile roof with brick coped gables and shaped kneelers. There are two storeys and an L-shaped plan, with a front range of four bays, and a rear wing. The doorway has a flat arch and to its right is a small single-light window. Further to the right is an inserted bow window, and another doorway. The other windows are casements with flat arches.
Airmyn Hall; 53.72046°N 0.90257°W		Early 18th century	A small country house that has been extended and divided. It is in red brick with stone dressings and hipped pantile roofs. There are two storeys, a main block of five bays, and a right service wing of four bays. The main bock has thin pilaster strips, a floor band and moulded eaves. The doorway has a fanlight, and the windows are sashes. To the left of the main block are full-height canted bay windows, and a later three-bay extension.
Westfield House; 53.71659°N 0.90463°W		Early 18th century	The house is in colourwashed brick, with a dentilled eaves cornice and a pantile roof. There are two storeys and attics, three bays, and a continuous rear outshut. The doorway and the windows, which are horizontally sliding sashes, have cambered brick arches. Inside, there is an inglenook fireplace.
Airmyn First School; 53.72135°N 0.90267°W		1834	Originally a Sunday school, it is in brick, with sandstone dressings, and a Welsh slate roof with coped gables and shaped kneelers. There is a single storey and an L-shaped plan, with three sections. The schoolroom, with its gable end facing the street, contains three windows with pointed heads and Y-tracery, and above them is an inscribed plaque. To the right is a projecting gabled wing with a pointed window, above which is a small rectangular window. On the right return is a circular window, and on the roof is a gabled bellcote. Further to the right is a doorway with a pointed head, flanked by windows, and above it is a gable with a recessed dated circular panel.
Clock Tower; 53.72118°N 0.90283°W		1866–68	The clock tower is in banded pink and yellow sandstone with a Welsh slate roof. There are three stages and a square plan. The lowest stage has angle buttresses surmounted by kneeling angels with shields. Between them is an entrance with a pointed moulded arch under a crocketed gabled hood mould with a finial. On the south side is an inscription and a date. On the middle stage are strip windows, angle shafts with foliate capitals, and a foliate corbel table. The top stage has clock faces on the east and south sides, angle shafts with moulded capitals, and above are gables with pierced quatrefoils. The tower is surmounted by a spire with lucarnes and a wrought iron finial.
