= St David's Church, Airmyn =

Church in Airmyn, East Riding of Yorkshire, England

Coordinates: 53°43′4.177″N 0°54′5.980″W

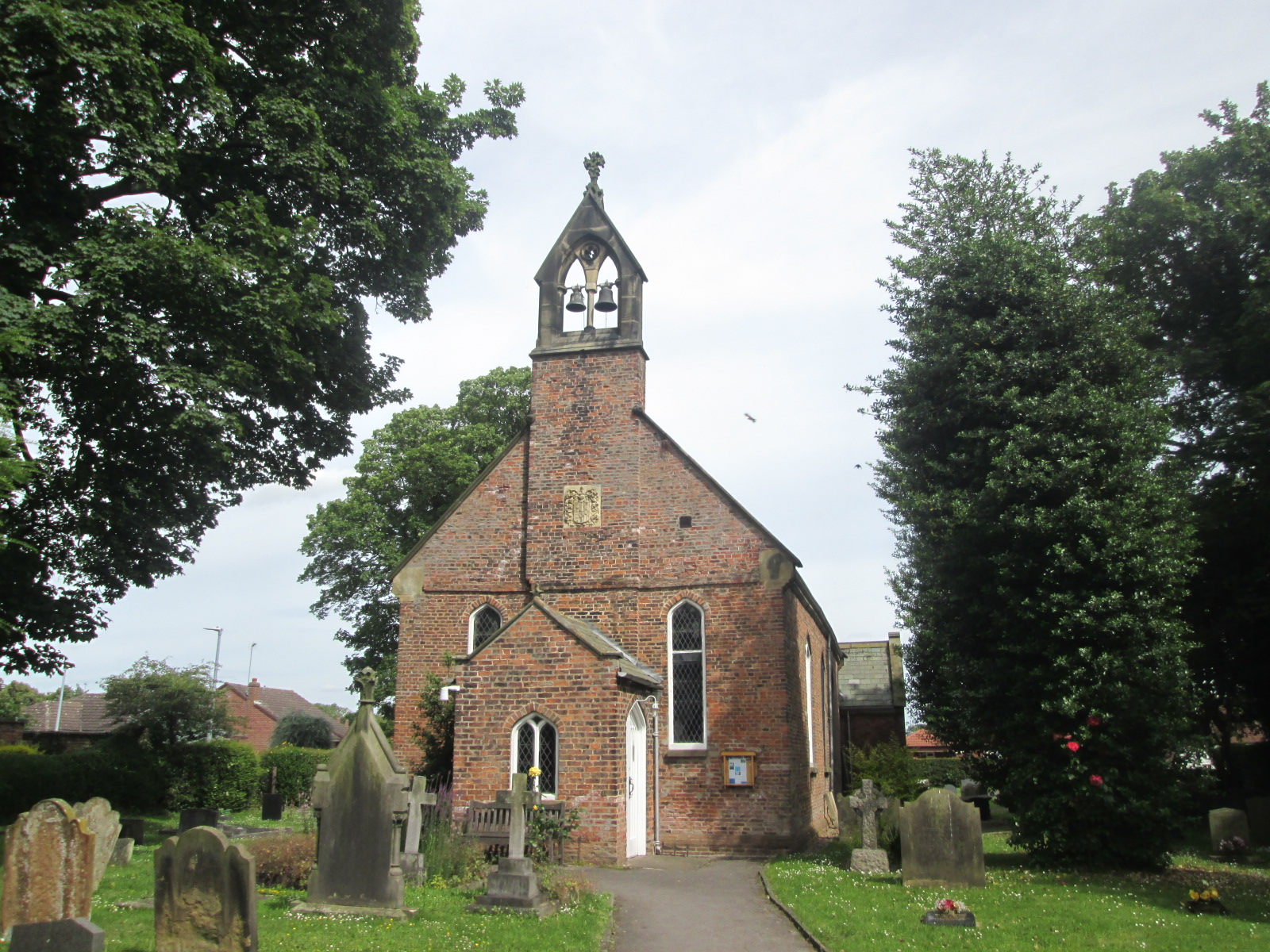
The church, in 2019

St David's Church is the parish church of Airmyn, a village in the East Riding of Yorkshire, in England.

In the Mediaeval period, Airmyn was in the parish of Snaith Priory. The villagers of Airmyn built a church in 1311, but the priory objected to this, and the Archbishop of York barred them from holding services in the new church. In 1318, it was finally dedicated, although it remained a chapel of ease to Snaith. The church was rebuilt in 1676, and then in 1858 a bellcote and porch were added to a design by Lockwood and Mawson, and the roof was replaced. In 1884, the chancel was rebuilt, and an organ chamber was added. The building was grade II listed in 1967.

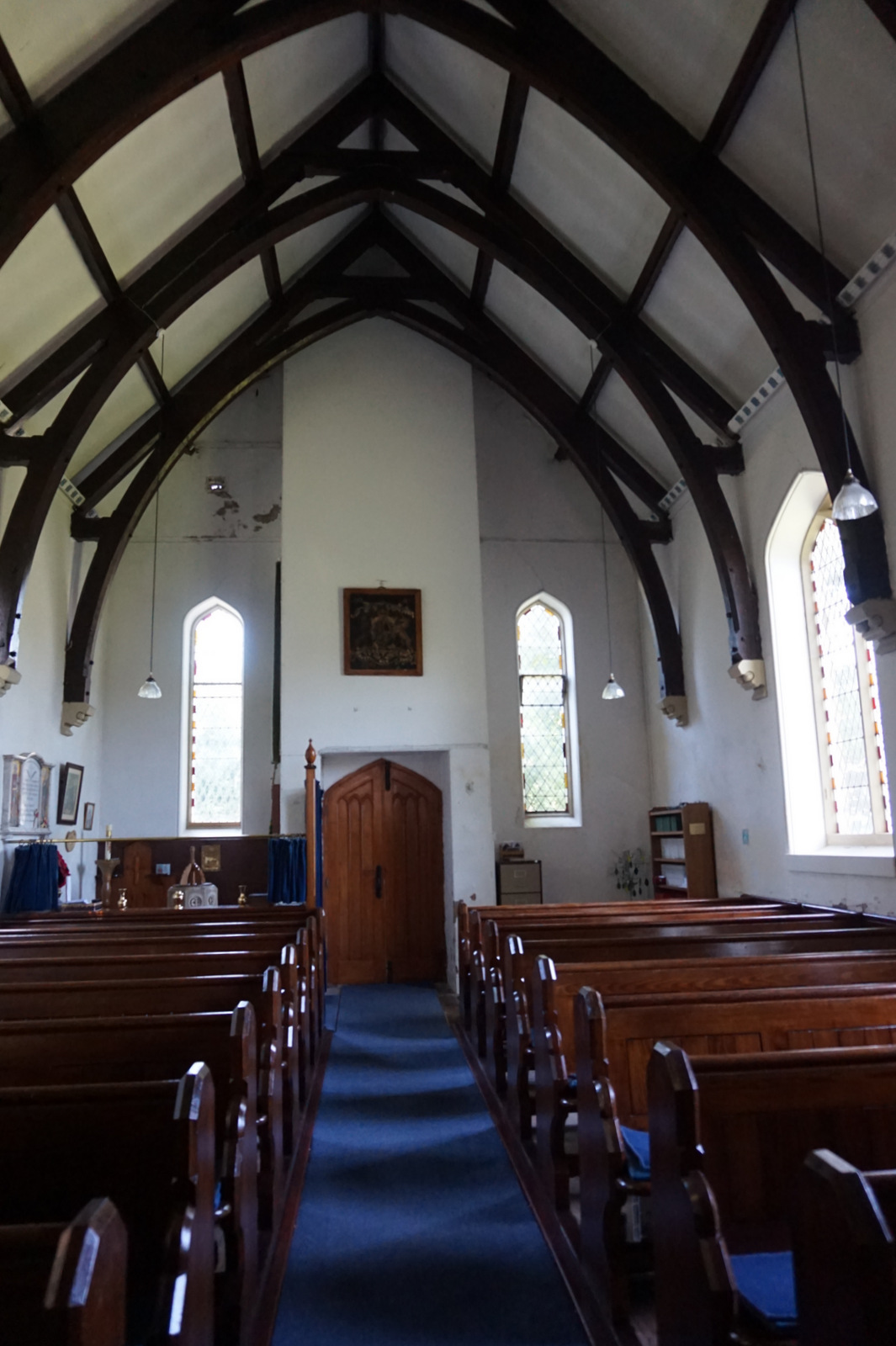
The nave

The church is built in red brick with stone dressings and a Westmorland slate roof. It consists of a nave with a west porch, a north vestry, and a chancel with a south organ chamber. On the west front, the porch is flanked by lancet windows, and above is a tablet with the date and a coat of arms. The gable is surmounted by a bellcote with two pointed bell openings, and a pierced quatrefoil under a coped gable with a pinnacle. Inside, there are numerous monuments from the 18th and 19th centuries, and stained glass designed by the Powell Brothers.

== See also ==
- Listed buildings in Airmyn
