= Airmyn Clock Tower =

Clock tower in Airmyn, East Riding of Yorkshire, England

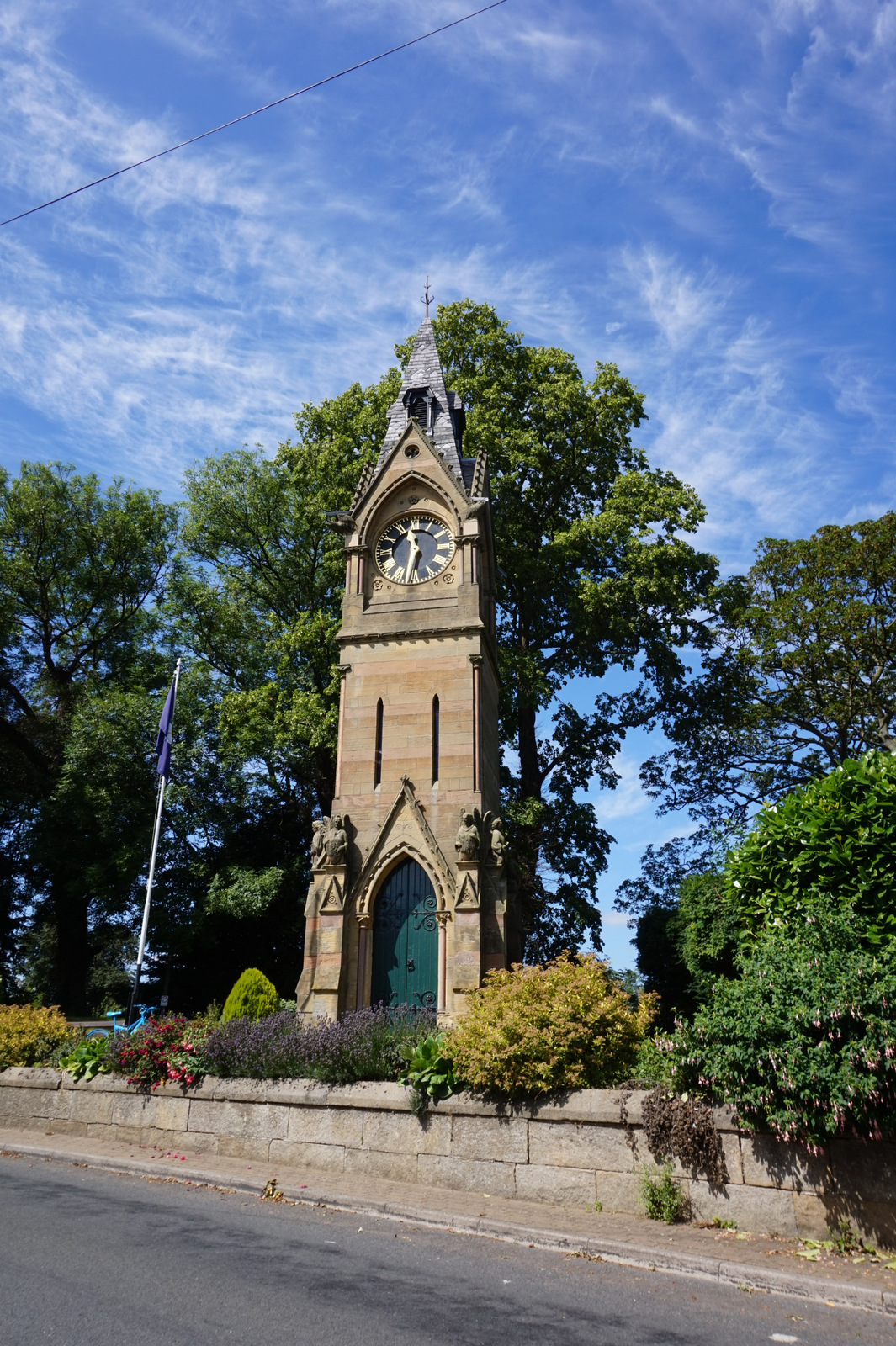
- The clock tower in 2019

- Location within East Riding of Yorkshire

General information
- Architectural style: Gothic Revival
- Location: High Street, Airmyn, East Riding of Yorkshire, England
- Coordinates: 53°43′16″N 0°54′10″W
- Year built: 1866–1868
- Client: George Percy

Design and construction
- Architect: Henry Francis Lockwood

Listed Building – Grade II
- Official name: Clock tower
- Designated: 16 December 1986
- Reference no.: 1378980

Airmyn Clock Tower is a historic building on High Street in Airmyn, a village in the East Riding of Yorkshire, England.

The clock tower was built between 1866 and 1868 for George Percy, to celebrate his becoming Duke of Northumberland. It was designed by Henry Francis Lockwood in the Gothic Revival style, at a cost of around £700. The building was Grade II listed in 1986.

The tower is built of banded pink and yellow sandstone with a Welsh slate roof. There are three stages and a square plan. The lowest stage has angle buttresses surmounted by kneeling angels with shields. Between them is an entrance with a pointed moulded arch under a crocketed gabled hood mould with a finial. On the south side is an inscription and a date. On the middle stage are strip windows, angle shafts with foliate capitals, and a foliate corbel table. The top stage has clock faces on the east and south sides, angle shafts with moulded capitals, and above are gables with pierced quatrefoils. The tower is surmounted by a spire with lucarnes and a wrought iron finial.

== See also ==
- Listed buildings in Airmyn
