= St George's Hall, Bradford =

Concert hall in Bradford, West Yorkshire, England

St George's Hall
- Interactive map of St George's Hall
- Address: Bridge Street; Bradford; England
- Coordinates: 53.7925°N 1.7511°W
- Owner: Bradford Theatres
- Capacity: 1,335 Short Stage Format
- Type: Concert Hall
- Designation: Listed Building Grade II*

Construction
- Opened: 29 August 1853
- Years active: 167
- Architects: Henry Francis Lockwood and William Mawson

St George's Hall is a strategic grade II* listed Victorian building located in the centre of Bradford, West Yorkshire, England. Originally designed with a seating capacity of 3,500, the hall seats up to 1,335 people and 1,550 for standing concerts. It is one of the oldest concert halls still in use in the United Kingdom. German Jewish wool merchants who had moved to Bradford because of its textile industry, partly financed the building of St George's Hall, and were instrumental in its construction.

== Design ==
View of the building under a rainbow

The building's design, by Henry Francis Lockwood and William Mawson, was chosen from more than twenty-two designs submitted during an 1849 competition. Built of ashlar sandstone masonry in neoclassical style, the building was opened on 29 August 1853. Its stone was obtained from Leeds, as the Bradford quarries were not able to supply the stone needed for the venture, as they were not in full production. The architectural sculpture, including all the exterior swags and keystone heads, was executed by Robert Mawer. The style of the building was based on Birmingham Town Hall and Liverpool St George's Hall, and was the first building in Bradford that was in an Italianate rather than a Greek Revival style. Despite being well received by the locals, having a classical influence and its architects being awarded other lucrative contracts for other buildings in the city centre, the building was not liked by Nikolaus Pevsner. In his book on the West Riding of Yorkshire, he said it was a "...poor relation of Liverpool St George's Hall and Birmingham Town Hall..."

The interior underwent extensive remodelling after the Second World War and again after fires in the 1980s. In March 2016 a £9 million restoration scheme was started. St George's Hall reopened in February 2019 with improved seating and sightlines, a flexible stage and newly refurbished Bars and Foyers.

== History ==
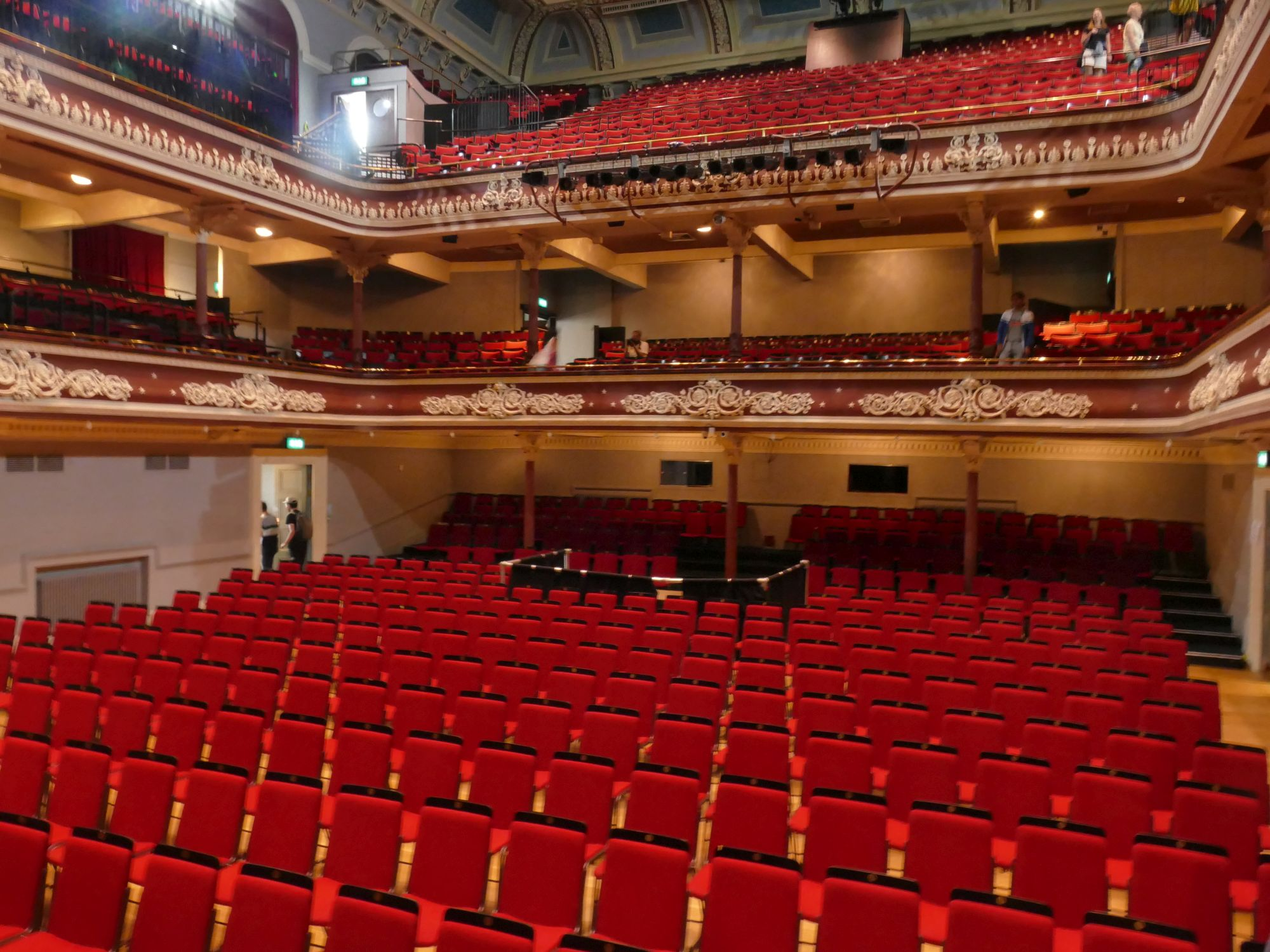
Interior of St George's Hall

In the early nineteenth century, as Bradford grew in size, it became clear there was a need in the city for a venue for public meetings and concerts. The buildings that were in use for this purpose – the Exchange Buildings and Mechanics' Institute – were proving insufficient for the city's needs. As a result, a group of shareholders was brought together by the city's mayor, Samuel Smith, in 1849 for the purpose of building a music hall. £16,000 of capital was raised, in £10 shares and a site on the corner of Bridge Street and Hall Ings was chosen as the location of the hall. Its construction was also partly funded by German wool merchants who had emigrated into Bradford in the 19th century. The foundation stone was laid in 1851 by the Earl of Zetland and the hall was completed in 1853. In a speech at the hall on its opening day, Smith, who had been a fervent campaigner for the music hall, said;

Here we may oftimes see the young men and the old, with their wives, and daughters and sisters, listening with deep and rapt attention to the soul-inspiring strains of music...

The venue is now grade II* listed and is one of the oldest concert halls still in use in the United Kingdom.

The venue has hosted many of the world's top performers over the years including Charles Dickens, Edwin Waugh, the Hallé Orchestra, Henry Irving, Dr Livingstone and Winston Churchill in 1910, whose speech was interrupted by Alfred Hawkins, husband of the suffragette Alice Hawkins, heckling on the issue of women’s rights. There is no evidence that Suffragettes interrupted the speech.

In the latter half of the twentieth century, David Bowie and rock bands such as The Rolling Stones, Led Zeppelin, Free, Genesis, INXS, Bon Jovi, and Kiss performed at the hall.

== 2016–2019 refurbishment ==
In March 2016, the hall closed its doors to undergo a £9 million refurbishment plan after securing funding from both the Heritage Lottery Fund and Bradford Council. As part of the plans, the sandstone exterior underwent a full restoration and internal improvements were made to both the front of house areas and the auditorium. As well as this, the original entrance was reinstated on Hall Ings and the colonnade was glazed to create a draught lobby. The venue reopened in February 2019.

== See also ==
- Grade II* listed buildings in Bradford
- Listed buildings in Bradford (City Ward)

== Bibliography ==
- James, John (1866). The History of Bradford and Its Parish: With Additions and Continuation to the Time. Vol. 1. Bradford: Longman, Green, Reader and Dyer.
