= Airmyn =

Village and civil parish in the East Riding of Yorkshire, England

Coordinates: 53°43′06″N 0°54′03″W

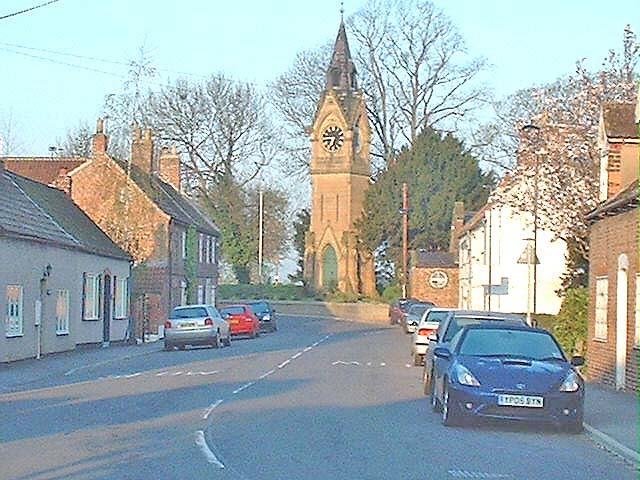
- The clock tower, Airmyn

- Location within the East Riding of Yorkshire
- Population: 768 (2011 census)
- OS grid reference: SE726253
  - London: 155 mi (249 km) S
- Civil parish: Airmyn
- Unitary authority: East Riding of Yorkshire
- Ceremonial county: East Riding of Yorkshire
- Region: Yorkshire and the Humber
- Country: England
- Sovereign state: United Kingdom
- Post town: GOOLE
- Postcode district: DN14
- Dialling code: 01405
- Police: Humberside
- Fire: Humberside
- Ambulance: Yorkshire
- UK Parliament: Goole and Pocklington

Airmyn is a village and civil parish in the East Riding of Yorkshire, England. It is situated at the mouth of the River Aire with the River Ouse, approximately 2 miles (3.2 km) north-west of Goole. It lies to the west of the M62 motorway and the A614 road. According to the 2011 UK census, Airmyn parish had a population of 768, a fall from the 2001 UK census figure of 795. The parish covers an area of 1,155.353 hectares (2,854.94 acres).

The parish was part of the Goole Rural District in the West Riding of Yorkshire from 1894 to 1974, then in Boothferry district of Humberside until 1996.

The name Airmyn derives from the river name Aire combined with the Old Norse mynni meaning 'river mouth'.

In the Middle Ages, Airmyn was a small port, and up to the 18th century its dead were taken by boat upstream to be buried at Snaith, as it was quicker to go by river than by horse and cart.

== Buildings ==
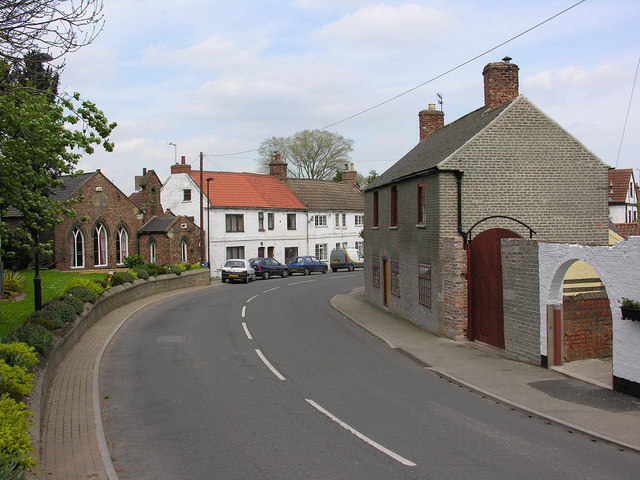
High Street, Airmyn

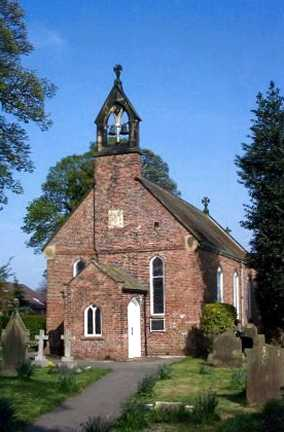
St David's Church, Airmyn

The village has its own primary school, Airmyn Park Primary School, which holds just over 100 pupils. The present building was opened in 1991, and has four classrooms, together with a hall, communal areas and offices. It was designed for 105 children. Before moving to the new building, the school was located on High Street, in a building which was erected in 1834 by George Percy, the Earl of Beverley. It was intended to be a Sunday School, but was being used as a day-school by 1840, and was able to accommodate 120 pupils. Near the old school is Airmyn Clock Tower, designed by Henry Francis Lockwood of Bradford and built in 1865, which was paid for by the village population, to honour the memory of the second Earl, who funded the building of the school.

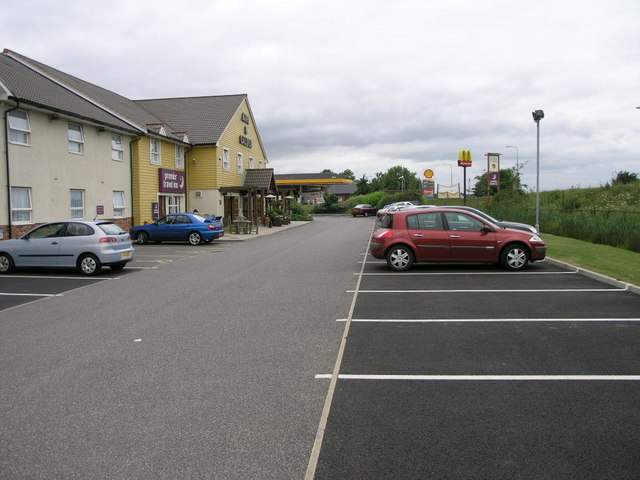
M62 Motorway Services

There is a memorial hall located next to the village field, and "Woodland Park", named by an Airmyn Park Primary School pupil. A Post Office at the Memorial Hall is open twice a week and staffed by volunteers. St David's Church, Airmyn is a Grade II listed building originally built in 1318 and extended in 1676. The roof was replaced with a new one of Westmorland slate in 1858, as part of refurbishments that also included a bellcote and a porch on the west end. It also has a graveyard.

== Port of Airmyn ==
Although the River Aire joins the Ouse at Airmyn, the main port facilities for the Aire and Calder Navigation were originally further upstream at Rawcliffe. However, in 1736 they decided to buy land at Airmyn, as the water was deeper, and larger vessels could not always reach Rawcliffe, particularly on neap tides. The land was bought in 1744, and Airmyn gradually replaced Rawcliffe, as staithes, woolsheds, a crane and various other buildings were erected by those who leased the navigation. In 1750, the Aire and Calder Company repaid those who had built the facilities, and took ownership of them. By 1774, most of the Aire and Calder staff were also based at Airmyn. It became possible to catch a ship from Airmyn to London, as a regular service began in 1758, charging the same fares as those from Hull to London.

Success was short-lived. In 1774, the Aire and Calder decided to build the Selby Canal, which would bypass the lower Aire and join the Ouse further upstream. Until then, Airmyn had acted as a transshipment point, where cargo was transferred from seagoing ships to river vessels. A new woolshed was built in 1775, and there was a coal yard, where coal was sold. Six staff were employed to manage the facility, which was also the base for the company's river boats. In one week in July 1775, 19 boats were loaded, and nine vessels, one from London and eight from Hull, had arrived within a four-day period. Once the Selby Canal opened in 1776, decline was rapid. The coalyard and the offices closed in 1779, and two years later, all buildings on the north bank of the river were demolished, while those on the south bank were sold. The boat repair yard closed soon afterwards.

Airmyn, along with nearby Rawcliffe, was the location of one of the first reliable reports of the practice of warping in agriculture in the 1730s. This was the temporary flooding of fields so as to fertilise the soil with the silt left behind.

== Gallery ==
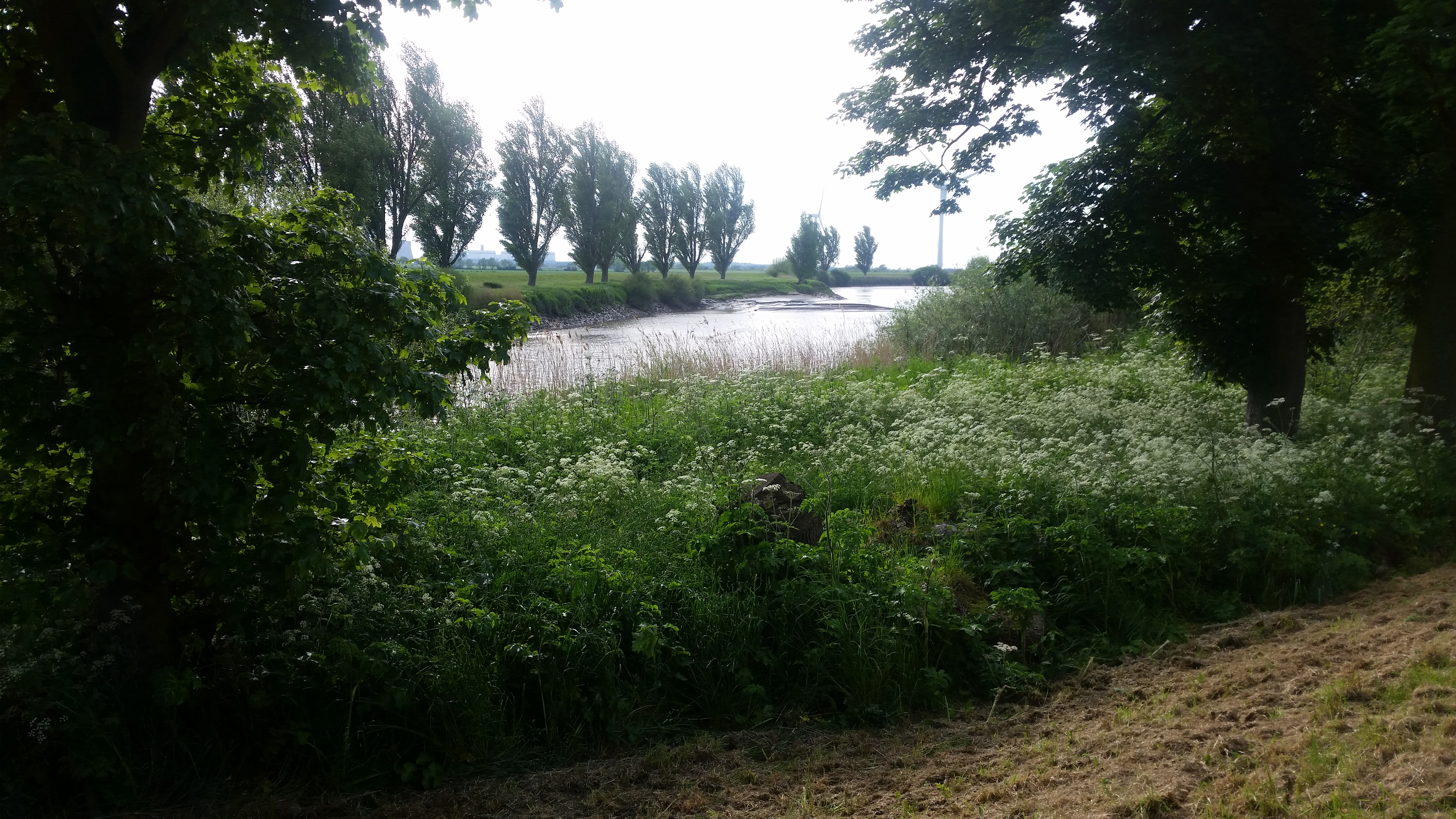
The River Aire as it approaches the River Ouse at Airmyn

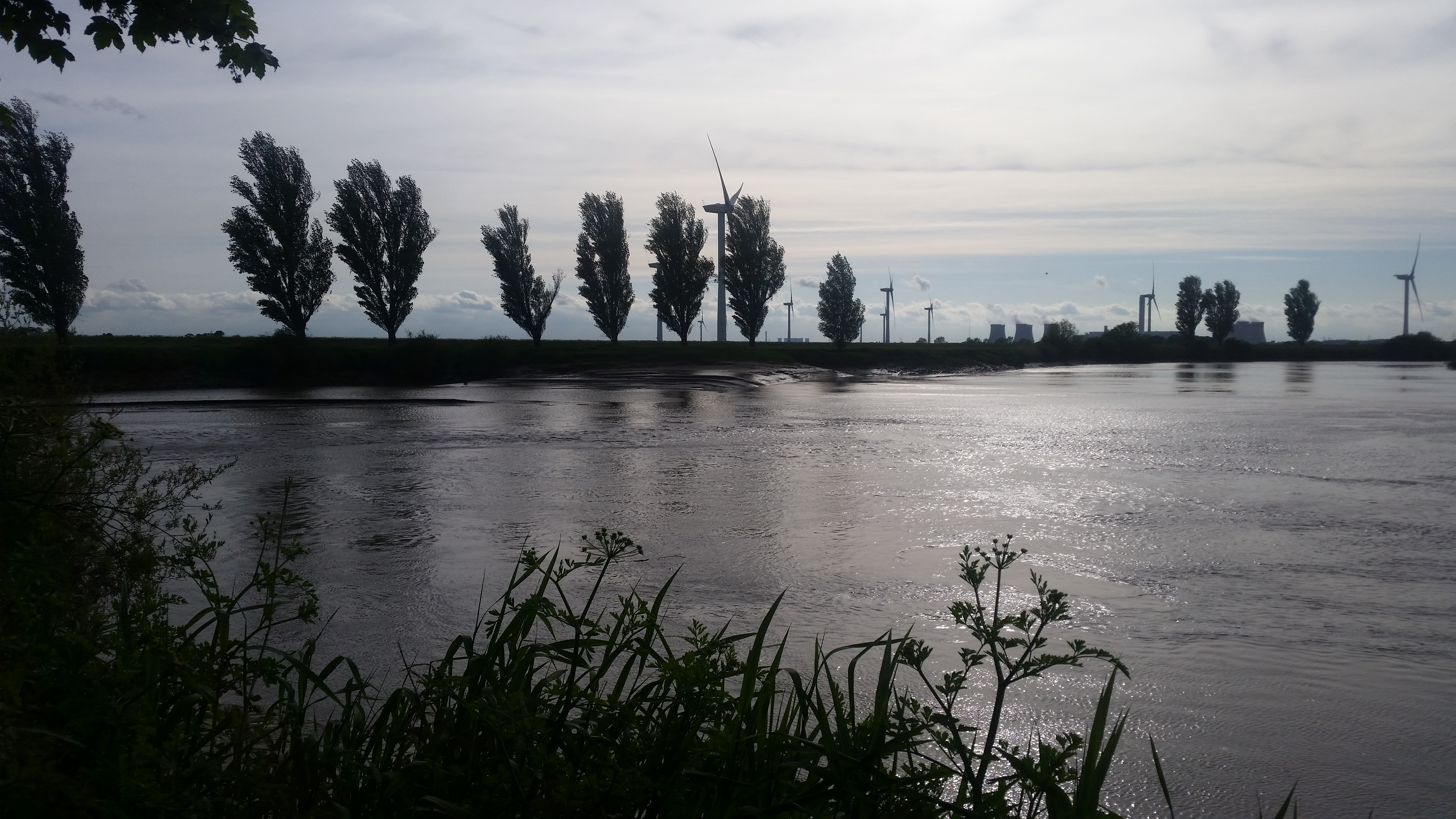
The confluence of the River Aire and River Ouse. The Aire emerges from the left.
