= Bradford City Hall =

Municipal building in Bradford, West Yorkshire, England

- Main facade of the City Hall

General information
- Architectural style: Venetian gothic
- Location: Bradford, England
- Coordinates: 53°47′32″N 1°45′12″W
- Construction started: 1870
- Completed: 1873; Extensions 1909; 1914
- Cost: £100,000 in 1873
- Client: Bradford Council

Technical details
- Structural system: Gaisby rock sandstone

Design and construction
- Architects: Lockwood and Mawson 1873; Norman Shaw 1909; William Williamson 1914

Listed Building – Grade I
- Designated: 14 June 1963
- Reference no.: 1133675

Bradford City Hall is a 19th-century town hall in Centenary Square, Bradford, West Yorkshire, England. It is a Grade I listed building which has a distinctive clock tower.

== History ==
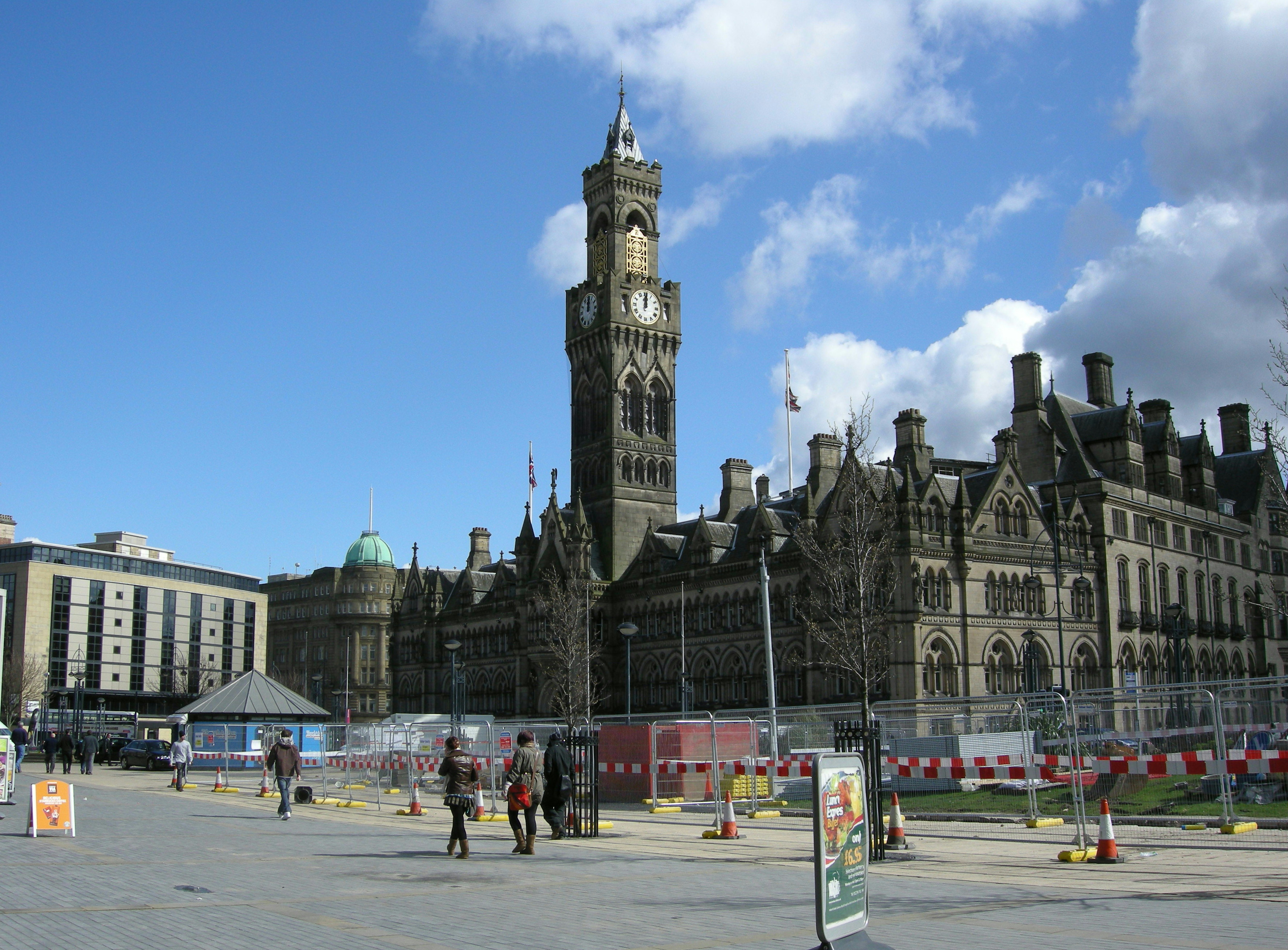
View of City Hall from Centenary Square

Before its relocation, between 1847 and 1873, the town hall had been the Fire Station House in Swain Street. In 1869, a new triangular site was purchased, and a competition held for a design to rival the town halls of Leeds and Halifax. The local firm of Lockwood and Mawson was chosen over the other 31 entries. It was built by John Ives & Son of Shipley and took three years to build at a cost of £100,000. It was opened by Matthew Thompson, the mayor, on 9 September 1873.

It was first extended in 1909 to a design by Norman Shaw and executed by architect F.E.P. Edwards, with another council chamber, more committee rooms and a banqueting hall.

On 14 March 1912 Winston Churchill gave a speech outside the hall in which he called for the people to "go forward together and put these grave matters to the proof" (referring to Irish Home Rule). It was extended again with a new entrance and staircase in baroque marble by William Williamson in 1914.

In 1965 the name was changed to City Hall to reflect Bradford's prominence, and the building was improved at a cost of £12,000.

The City Hall was the venue for crown court trials until the new Law Courts in Exchange Square opened in 1993. After the bells stopped in 1992 due to decay of the bell frame, they were repaired with National Lottery funds in 1997.

In 2000 Barbara Jane Harrison, a flight attendant who died saving her passengers, was commemorated in a memorial display in the City Hall and in October 2006, the building was illuminated for Bradford Festival by artist Patrice Warrener. In 2007 the City Hall filled in for Manchester Crown Court for the duration of the trial of the character Tracy Barlow in Coronation Street.

In December 2007 the City Hall turned the city's nine Christmas trees into woodchips as fuel for its new heating boilers. An access tunnel was dug from the roadway to install the boilers in early 2008.

Two of the statues of monarchs on the façade : Stephen and Henry II

Tower and flagpole

== Description ==
=== Exterior ===
The building was designed in the Venetian style. There are a series of statues of past monarchs on the façade; the London firm Farmer & Brindley carved them from Cliffe Wood stone, from the local quarry on Bolton Road, at a cost of £63 each. On the side facing Centenary Square, the line of monarchs includes Oliver Cromwell. There is a flush bracket on the building with a code number once used to log the height above sea level.

The 1872 clock shortly before replacement in 1947.

The bell tower was inspired by Palazzo Vecchio in Florence. The top of the tower is 200 feet (61 m) high. It contains 13 bells, installed in 1872, which weighed 13 tons 3 quarters and 6 lbs and cost £1,765. They first rang at the opening in 1873. Due to lack of space in the tower they were not hung for ringing, but were chimed using an automatic carillon machine which could play 28 different tunes. The quarter-chiming clock, installed in 1872 at a cost of £2,248 5s was in operation until 1947; in that year it was replaced by a more modern mechanism. The original clock and carillon machine were manufactured by Gillett & Bland of Croydon; the bells were by Taylor of Loughborough.

The two flagpoles carry the flag of Wales on Saint David's Day and the flag of Australia on Australia Day. Flag use in response to major world disasters is made according to Government guidelines. The flags also reflect royal events, such as coronations and weddings.

The building is set in Centenary Square, which was developed and pedestrianised in 1997, the city's centenary. Staff give tours of the building on request. Annually in September the City Hall holds a heritage weekend, when visitors can see more of the building.

=== Interior ===
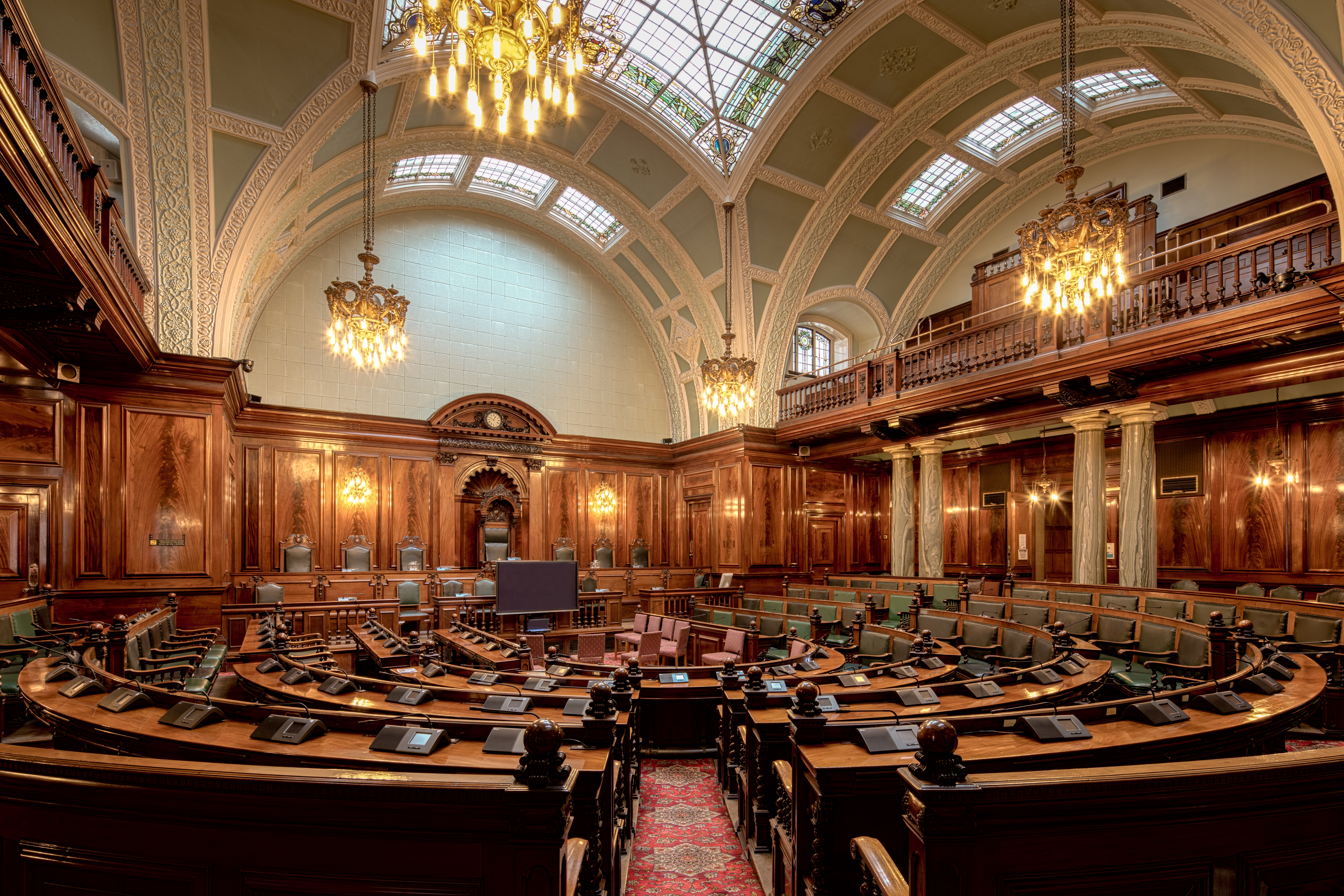
Council Chamber

In the banqueting hall is a 19th-century overmantel and frieze carved by C. R. Millar. The frieze carries the Bradford city motto: Labor omnia vincit (Hard work conquers all), reflecting the ethos of an industrial city, and the work ethic of the Evangelical movement represented by many local chapels. The figures on the frieze represent the wool trade between Bradford and the world, besides architecture and the arts.

=== Bells ===
Currently (2016) the bells ring every 15 minutes and play tunes at midday and late afternoon plus carols in December. When an eminent Bradfordian dies, the City Hall flags fly at half mast until the funeral is over, while the minute bell rings for an hour after receipt of notice, and for an hour at the time of the funeral. The bells have played "The Star-Spangled Banner" to mark the three minutes' silence for those who died due to terrorism. At the memorial in 2005 of the 1985 Bradford City stadium fire, "Dozens of people broke down in tears as the City Hall bells played You'll Never Walk Alone and Abide with Me in tribute to the victims."

However the bells normally play happier tunes, and in 2001 there was talk of replacing the old computer application which controlled the bells, so that they could play pop music. The bells can now be programmed to play any tune, subject to musical arrangement and technical limitations. The bells have played No Matter What several times in 2001, when Whistle Down the Wind was playing at the Alhambra; the operator of the bells was able to see the theatre steps from the bell tower, and timed the peals with the audience's exit. This meant that the superintendent had to undertake the long climb up the tower at 10.30 pm every day for a week, as the bell system was still under repair. In 2010, the bells played the theme tune from Coronation Street when the cast was filming in the area.

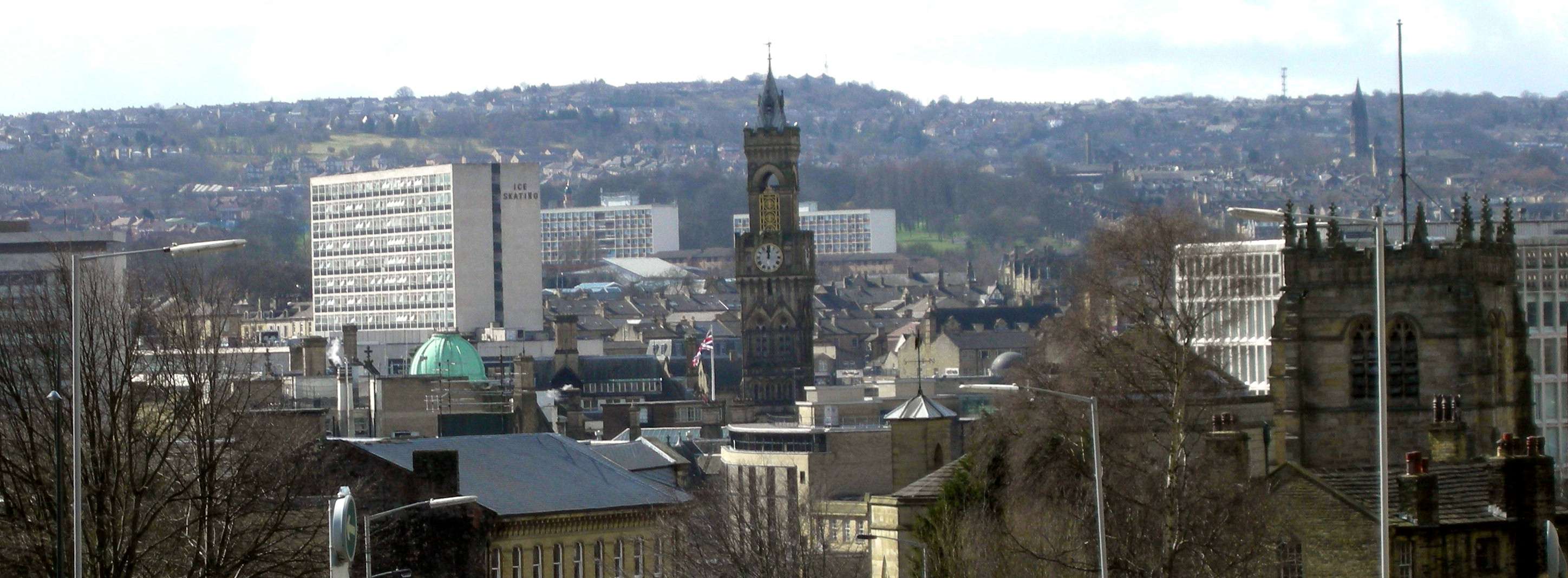
View of Bradford showing the tower of City Hall at centre

== See also ==
- Grade I listed buildings in West Yorkshire
- Listed buildings in Bradford (City Ward)
