= Swan Arcade, Bradford =

Building in Bradford, England

Coordinates: 53.793°N 1.752°W

The Swan Arcade was a four-storey building located between Market Street and Broadway, Bradford, England and stood opposite the Wool Exchange. The Bradford Beck ran beneath.

== Architecture and history ==
The Swan Arcade was designed in the Italianate style by the architects Milnes and France, and was built between 1877 and 1880 from Bolton Woods Stone by J and W Beanland, a firm instrumental in shaping Bradford’s built environment, at a cost of £160,000. The gates were made by Hodkinson and Co, and Taylor and Parsons.

It was opened in 1880 by the Mayor of Bradford and local MP Angus Holden, and named after the White Swan Inn, which had previously stood on the same site. The west wing, by John Moulson and sons was added in 1881. It covered a 2,630-square yard site.

The Arcade had six grand entrances, the main ones on Market Street incorporating graceful swans in stone and ironwork and Charles Street, and, within, four linked arcades with wrought iron glazed roofs and accommodation for offices and stock rooms. The ground floor occupants included a cigar merchant, a cabinet maker and two tailors.

At the start of the 20th century, mill owners established offices in the arcade, but after many years it reverted to its original role as a shopping centre. The names of the ground floor occupants were originally painted on the windows against a background which shut out the light. So hanging mirrors were placed in such a position that they reflected light from outside into offices and shops. In later years, there were mirrors angled downwards from the sides of the avenues.

The original lift, or chain of cages [driven by a gas engine], never stopped running in business hours but it went so slowly that it was easy to step in or out as it reached a floor level, and no attendant was needed. It was later replaced by an electric lift. In 1924, thieves raided 30 offices in the Arcade.

Author J B Priestley worked in the Swan Arcade as a junior clerk before the First World War, and the building made such an impression on him that the first part of his literary reminiscences Margin Released was titled The Swan Arcadian. He returned to the arcade in 1958 in a film made for the BBC.

== Decline of the Swan Arcade ==
In 1954 the Arndale Property Trust Ltd of Wakefield, an investment company which specialised in the development of central shopping and office sites, with extensive holdings in the North and Midlands, privately bought the Swan Arcade in for a reported sum of between £225,000–£250,000 – although the exact figure was never disclosed. The Trust waited eight years for leases to expire so that it could be demolished and replaced with a new shopping centre.

At the time Arndale bought it was bringing in rent of £15,481 a year from 112 tenants. Most of the offices were on six-month tenancies and the shops were on leases which were due to expire between 1955 and 1960. A spokesman for the Bradford company appointed to manage the block of shops and offices, S H Chippendale & Co, said that “no immediate material changes” were envisaged. He added: “It will depend on how Broadway develops. We regard it as a site in a developing area.” Work had already started on the adjoining site at the corner of Bank Street and Broadway (now occupied by the Yorkshire Building Society) and this, he said, was bound to have “an improving effect” on the Broadway frontage.

On 13 October 1960, the Arndale Property Trust declared that the arcade was to be pulled down and rebuilt “to fit in with Bradford’s central redevelopment”. Demolition would start when tenancy agreements ended in early 1962 and it was hoped that the building of what was to become Arndale House would start in May of that year.

In October 1961, the T&A reported that “Already the upper floors, until recently a hive of trade and activity, are dusty and silent. The lift no longer comes when you call.”

In the months prior to its closure, most of the 112 tenants in the Arcade shops and offices had moved out, and there were only two doing business there on the last day. One was an outfitters’ shop, still filled with racks of suits and coats which the staff were to move over the following weekend to Leeds, sometimes described as the ‘city of arcades’. The other was a confectioners’, which was carrying less than its usual Saturday stock. Former tenants and workmen removing fittings were the only other people at work.

It was estimated it would take about four months to pull down the city’s only arcade. At the time, J B Priestley declared himself displeased at the demolition plan, because it was in Swan Arcade that he used to work as a very young man.

In the interim period and beyond, several other Arndale centres were being built in other locations in northern England and Scotland. Just as Swan Arcade, when it was new, was described as being 50 years ahead of its time, so the Bradford Telegraph and Argus reported that its replacement, according to one of the architects who designed it, was "structurally the most advanced building to be constructed in the United Kingdom".

"A sale notice on the window of a men’s outfitters’ shop in Swan Arcade on the final day of business proclaimed ‘The last day’ for when the heavy iron gates were next opened after that night, the demolition men would be moving in.

== Demolition and aftermath ==
In the first days of March 1962, the last shops closed, the demolition workers moved in and Bradford’s only arcade was reduced to rubble, to be “replaced by a more efficient building to marry with the new city centre.” The Hodkinson and Co/Taylor and Parsons gates were sold off to a wealthy businessman. The following year, on the same site, building work commenced on Arndale House, an eight-storey office block with surrounding shops, which was completed in 1964. Arndale House stands to this day, having survived the ongoing Broadway re-development scheme which commenced in the early 2000s.

The demolition was a typical example of architectural purges in the 1960s, when many Victorian buildings across the UK were replaced with high-rise concrete and glass buildings. The Arndale Centres in general, built in a number of locations in northern England and Scotland were largely successful, but they also attracted a great deal of criticism as they often involved demolishing old buildings – particularly Victorian buildings – and replacing them with modern concrete constructions in a brutalist style. "There are people today amassing stupendous fortunes by systematically destroying our historic centres," raged architectural writer James Lees-Milne, in 1964. "Eventually, all the buildings of the area – good, bad and indifferent – are replaced with chain stores, supermarkets and blocks of flats devoid of all distinction, and all looking alike.”
