= Wool Exchange, Bradford =

Grade I listed building in Bradford, England

Coordinates: 53.7943°N 1.7523°W

The Wool Exchange, Bradford.

The Wool Exchange Building in Bradford, West Yorkshire, England, is a grade I-listed building built as a wool-trading centre in the 19th century. The grandeur of its Gothic Revival architecture is symbolic of the wealth and importance that wool brought to Bradford. Today it is a Waterstones bookshop as well as a cafe.

== Design history ==
Statue of King Edward III

Statue of Saint Blaise

It was built between 1864 and 1867. The commission to design the building was given great importance in Bradford and John Ruskin was invited to give his advice. He came to Bradford where he gave a lecture in which he famously declared 'I do not care about this Exchange - because you don't'. Ruskin argued that good architecture could only emerge from a pious, paternalistic society and that the Exchange represented the worst form of exploitative capitalism.

There was a competition to design the building: entries included one from Norman Shaw, but it was won by the local architects Lockwood and Mawson. The construction was entrusted to J and W Beanland, a firm instrumental in shaping Bradford’s built environment. The foundation stone was laid by the then Prime Minister, Lord Palmerston. The architectural style employed is Venetian Gothic with some Flemish influence in the tower. Ruskin praised Venetian Gothic architecture in his book The Stones of Venice, but he was dismayed by the use of a Gothic revivalist style in that it imitated the aesthetic but not the spiritual conditions of Medieval society. He had expressed similar displeasure after the construction of the Oxford University Museum of Natural History in a Gothic revivalist style in 1861. The accompanying photograph shows the architectural detail of the tower and arcading well, but the light is not strong enough for the contrasting stone colours to emerge. When the building was listed in 1963, the interior of the hall was officially described as follows:

"The main hall is still used as a Wool exchange and has finely detailed lofty hammer-beam roof with wrought iron work decoration. The hall is surrounded by tall polished granite columns with foliate capitals and there is an outer south aisle arcade with good naturalistic foliage carving. Lively wrought ironwork balcony and staircase balustrade. The Wool Exchange, perhaps more than any other building, symbolises the wealth and importance that Bradford had gained by the mid C19, on the basis of the wool trade." English Heritage Archive.

The "good, naturalistic foliage carving" and all other architectural carvings (except the figures by Tolmie at the entrance) were carved by Mawer and Ingle of Leeds.

== Trading practices ==
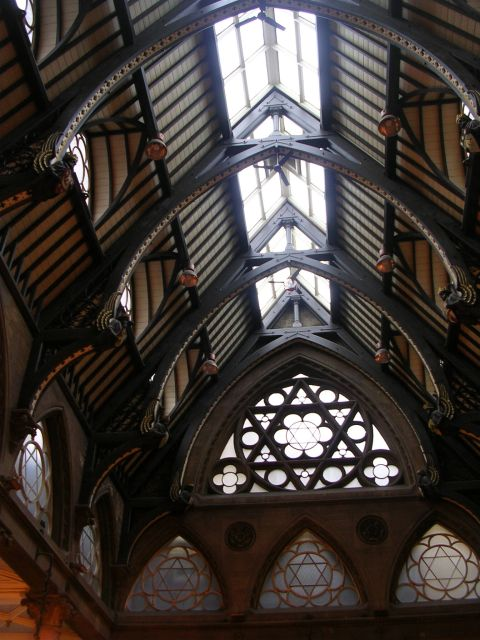
Hammerbeam roof interior; now over Waterstones.

The trading on the Exchange was by verbal contract only, each party keeping a separate note of the price, quantity and delivery date. Members only (holding tickets authorised by the Committee, usually sponsored by an employing firm) were allowed on the trading floor, but there was a walk around the floor where freelance salesmen and independent traders were allowed to wait in an attempt to catch a member's eye and close a deal "off floor". "Off floor" you took your chance on the wool delivered being up to sample; all "on floor" deals involved the wool being delivered via the conditioning house on Canal Road where the wool was checked for quality (staple length) and dry weight, since adding water was a favourite swindle. To be a member - to "have a ticket" - was a social distinction in the old wool-trading Bradford.

== Spinks' restaurant ==
Almost as socially important as the Exchange itself was Spinks' restaurant (with its trademark Egyptian sphinx embossed on all the cutlery), which was in a semi-basement below the building. There were two public rooms: the Restaurant, which served a "Plated Menu", and the Buttery, which served a full "Silver Service" menu. The menus were almost identical and came from the same kitchen, just the style of service differed. In practice, almost as much trading and networking went on in these two rooms as on the floor upstairs. Since the restaurant was open to the public, not just to members, the place was a centre for Bradford business life in general.

== The building today ==
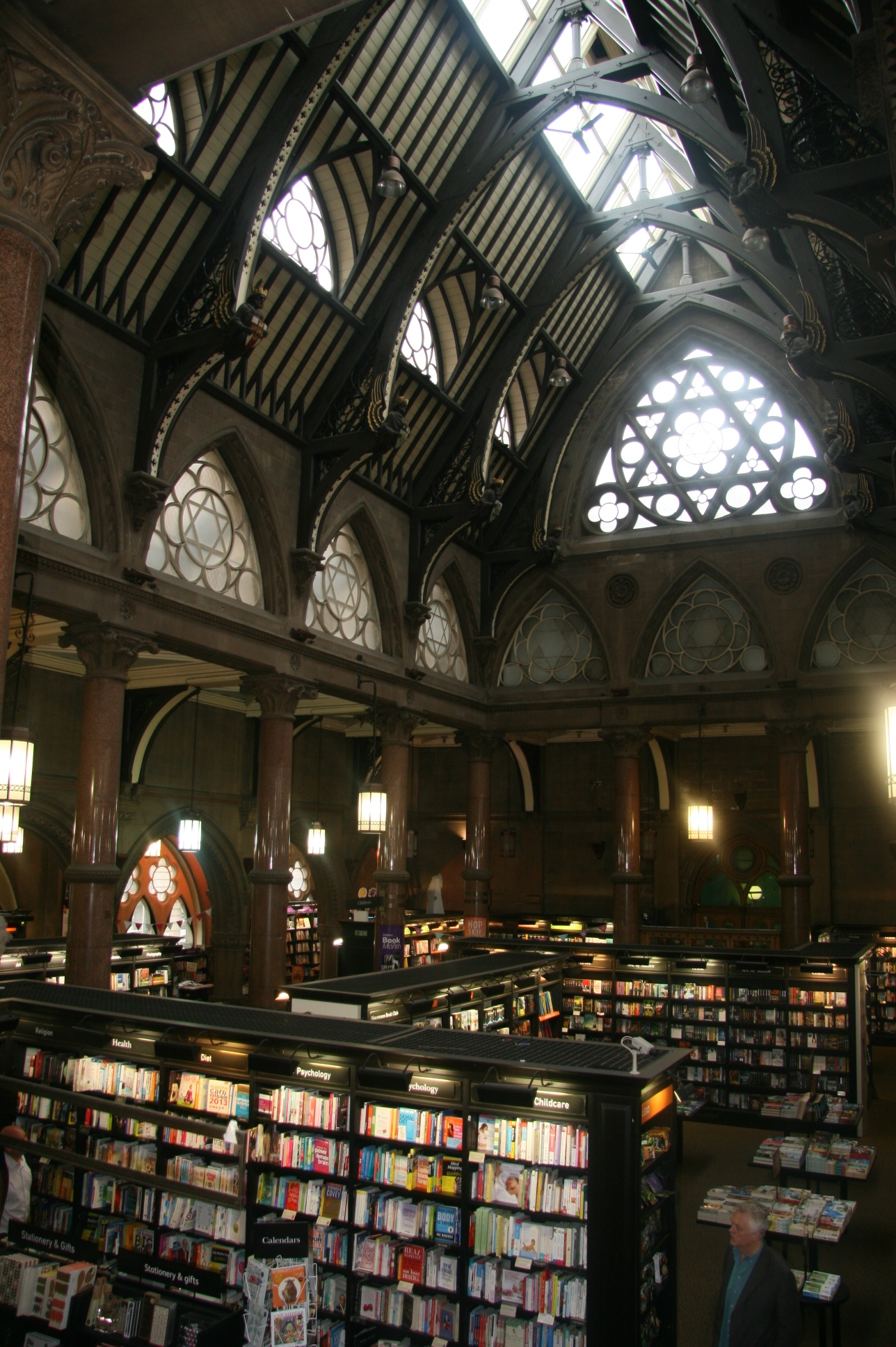
interior - Wool Exchange, Bradford, now a Waterstones

The building has not been used for trading wool since the early 1970s. Waterstones uses the ground floor area for book sales. The best views of the interior are available from the coffee shop on the mezzanine floor. Modern plate-glass windows on this side of the building let in plenty of natural light, something that was lacking in the old days of wool-trading.

For more than 15 years, coffeehouse chain Starbucks occupied the space on the mezzanine floor. However, in February 2013, they closed this branch, with Waterstones replacing it with their own 'Café W' brand which opened in March 2013.

As well as Waterstones and Café W, the building currently hosts a newsagent, pizza restaurant, panini shop, employment agency and the Exchange Ale House. The exterior has sculptures of various heroes of the textile industry such as Joseph Marie Jacquard and also explorers and politicians. In keeping with this semantic, there is a large statue of the Free Trade campaigner Richard Cobden within the building. Cobden was twice member of Parliament for The West Riding of Yorkshire and the statue was donated by a George Henry Booth, of the firm Firth Booth and Co., an American citizen who had business in Bradford.

The building stands opposite Arndale House, which was built on the site of the Victorian Swan Arcade, the former workplace of J. B. Priestley which was controversially demolished in 1962.

== See also ==
- Grade I listed buildings in West Yorkshire
- Listed buildings in Bradford (City Ward)
