= William Mawson =

English architect

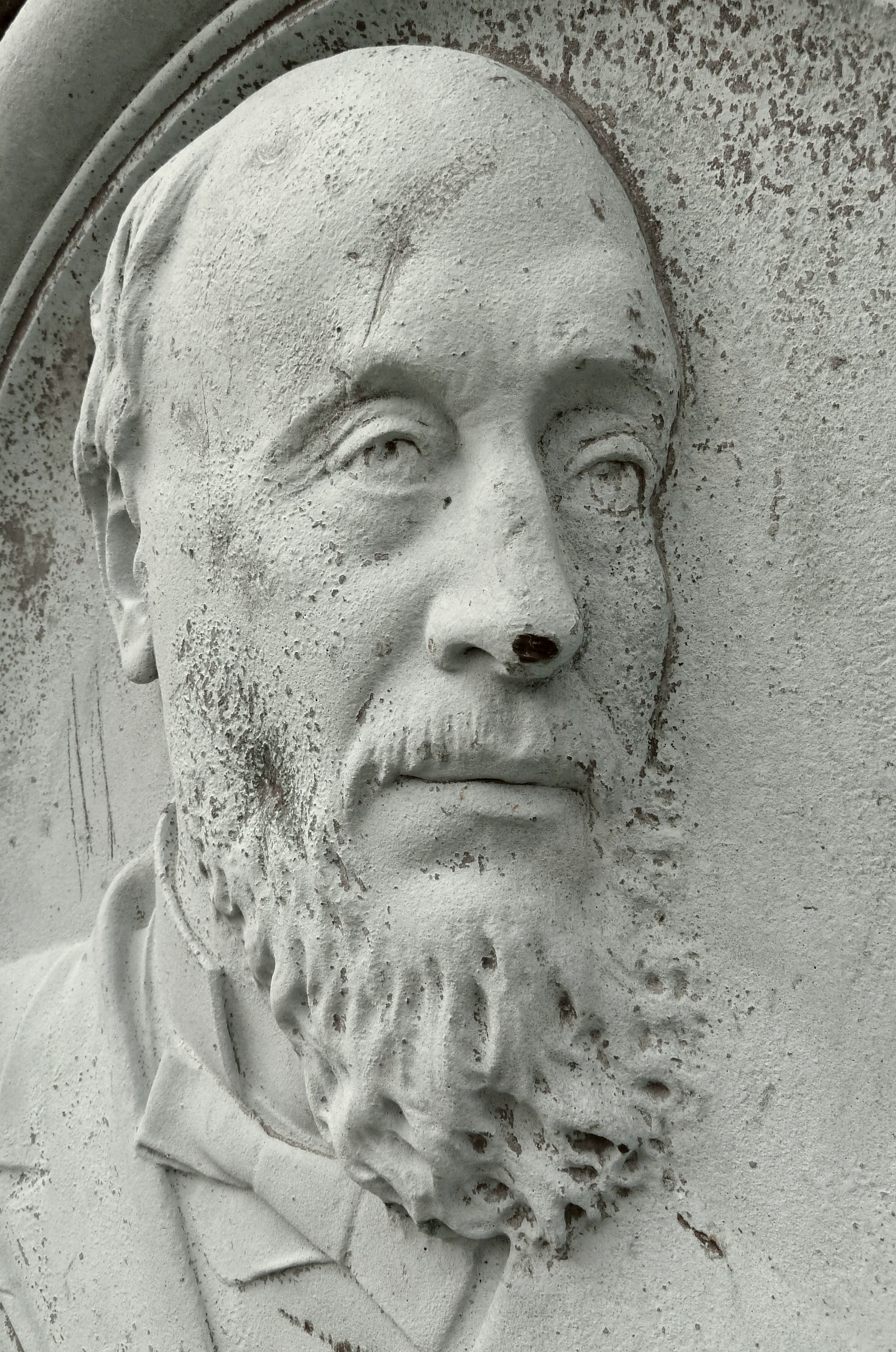
- William Mawson
- Born: 17 May 1828; Leeds, Yorkshire, England
- Died: 25 April 1889 (aged 60); Bradford, Yorkshire, England
- Occupation: Architect
- Parent(s): William Mawson, paper manufacturer Mary Mawson
- Practice: Lockwood & Mawson; W & R Mawson
- Buildings: St George's Hall, 1852; Wool Exchange, 1867; Bradford City Hall, 1873
- Projects: Layout of Saltaire, 1876

William Mawson (17 May 1828 – 25 April 1889) was an English architect best known for his work in and around Bradford.

== Background ==
Mawson was born in Leeds on 17 May 1828 to parents William and Mary Mawson. His father was a prominent paper manufacturer and councilor in Leeds.

William Mawson moved from Leeds to Bradford, after he finished his articles in late 1840s. At that time he was aged 21 and in 1849 he became a partner of the older Henry Francis Lockwood. Initially Mawson lived with his eldest brother Henry and his family at 27 Hanover Square, Bradford. Henry Mawson was a bookseller and printer with a business in Kirkgate Bradford. Also living in this house was their sister, Mary Ann Mawson, whose son Francis Mawson Rattenbury was articled to Mawson and who was to become a famous architect in Canada and who was subsequently murdered by his wife and young chauffeur in the famous case of 1935.

Mawson died in 1889 and spent the last twenty years of his life living at 3 Clifton Villas, Bradford with his mother – until she died in 1881 – and his brother Richard. William and Richard never married.

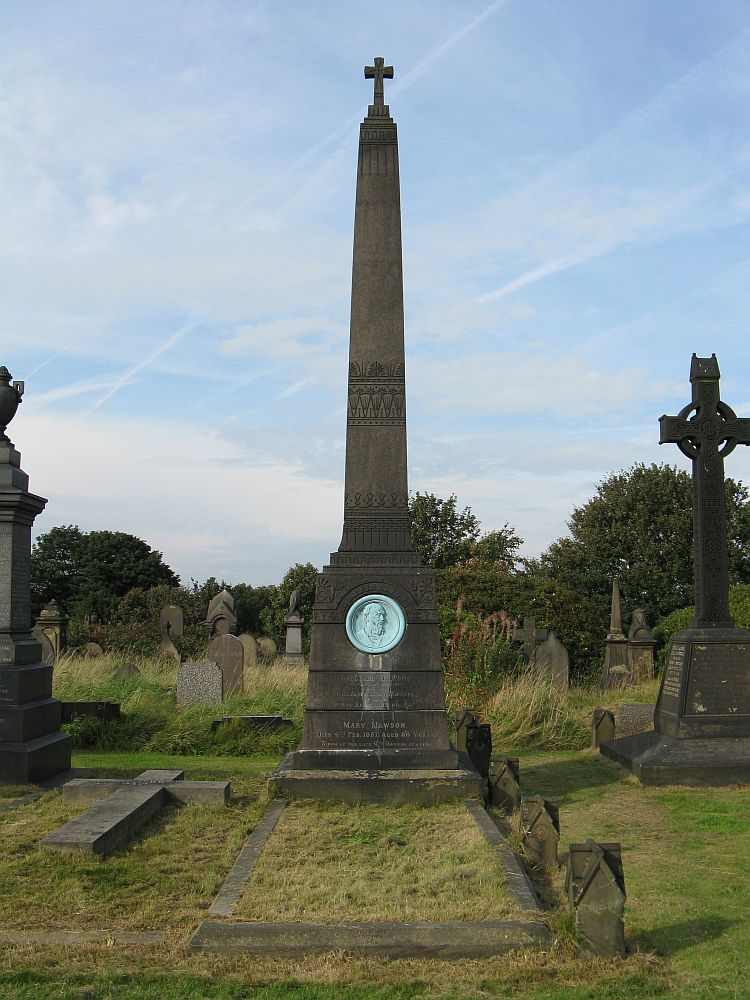
Burial Plot of William Mawson

William Mawson, along with his brother Richard and his mother Mary Mawson, is buried in Undercliffe Cemetery where the imposing Egyptian obelisk with a bronze portrait of William is situated on the main terrace. It is a Grade II listed monument.

== Lockwood and Mawson ==
The foundation of Mawson’s success as an architect was his partnership with Francis Lockwood in the firm of ‘Lockwood and Mawson’. Lockwood and Mawson transformed Bradford in period 1850 -1875 as this period saw Bradford grow at an unprecedented rate. This mercurial growth demanded new industrial, residential and civic buildings and the firm was instrumental in helping to drive this building boom in the years between 1850 and 1875.

Lockwood and Mawson's success was due to three factors. Firstly, the three main architects – Lockwood and the Mawson brothers – were all from Yorkshire which appealed to local businessmen. Secondly, they were situated in Bradford when architects were most needed as the town boomed. Thirdly, they worked well together: Lockwood was the most architecturally talented; William Mawson was known for his practical ability; Richard Mawson was a social asset and a fine sportsman who made the important friends and contacts.

With the death of Lockwood in 1878 the firm was renamed W & R Mawson with William’s brother, Richard Mawson (1834–1904), becoming the second partner. With the death of Lockwood the partnership lost its creativity. A young Francis Mawson Rattenbury joined the firm in 1886 as a student but during the six years he was with them the company made little impact or designed buildings of importance. The business address of the partnership was The Exchange Buildings, Bradford, West Yorkshire.

=== Buildings ===
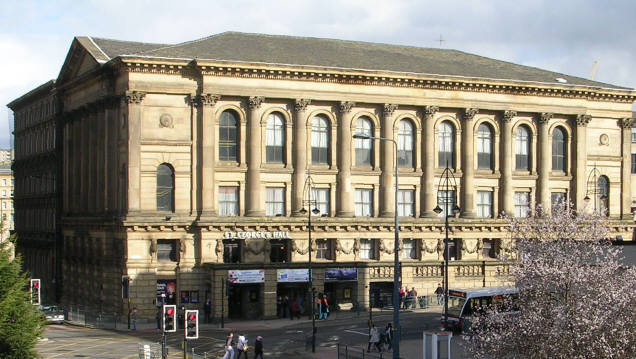
St George's Hall, Bradford

In 1849 Lockwood and Mawson won a competition against twenty-one other entrants to design St George's Hall. St George’s Hall is the oldest concert hall still in use in Britain. It was built of sandstone masonry in neoclassic style and was opened on 29 August 1853. The total cost of the building works was £35,000 and the venue initially seated 3,500 people. It is a Grade II* listed building.

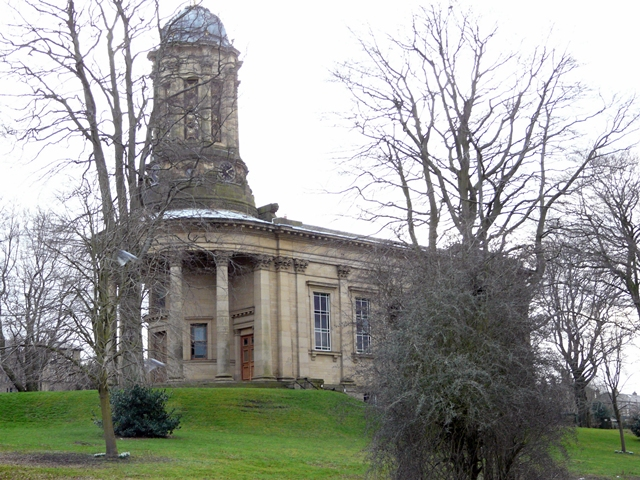
United Reformed Church Saltaire

In 1850 the enterprising and innovative mill owner Titus Salt turned to the partnership to plan and design a large mill and model village. This became Saltaire which is now a UNESCO World Heritage Site due to its international influence as it was innovative and progressive project. Lockwood and Mawson designed the entire village in a classical style that had been inspired by the Renaissance. Their outstanding individual work is the Saltaire United Reformed Church which is a Grade I listed building. They designed housing to the highest quality with every house having a water supply, gas lighting, an outdoor privy, separate living and cooking spaces. Most other workers at this time would be living in dark hovels with no such facilities. The streets in Saltaire are named after Titus Salt’s family and members of the Royal Family with the notable exception of two streets which are named after William Mawson and Francis Lockwood.

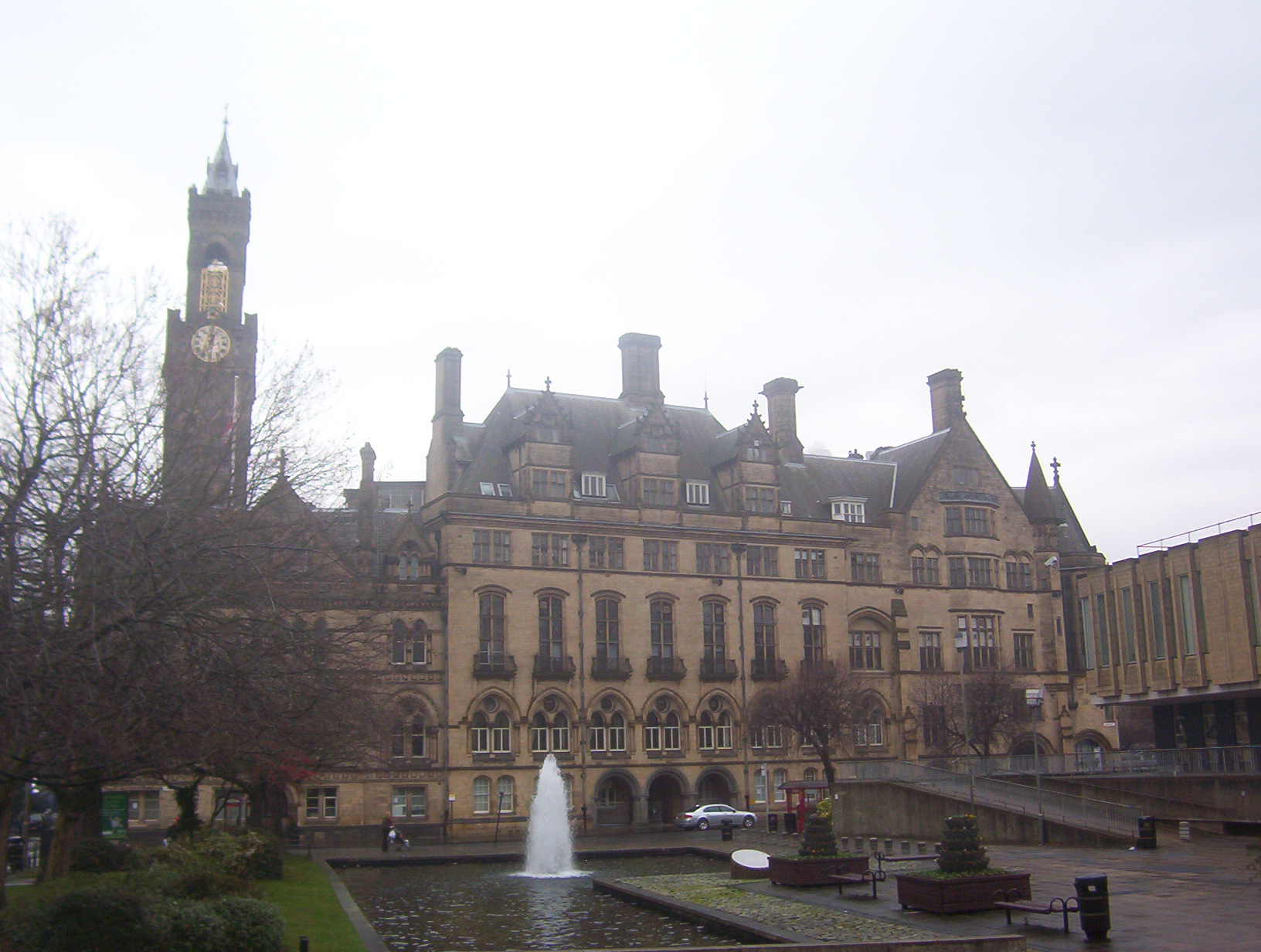
Bradford City Hall

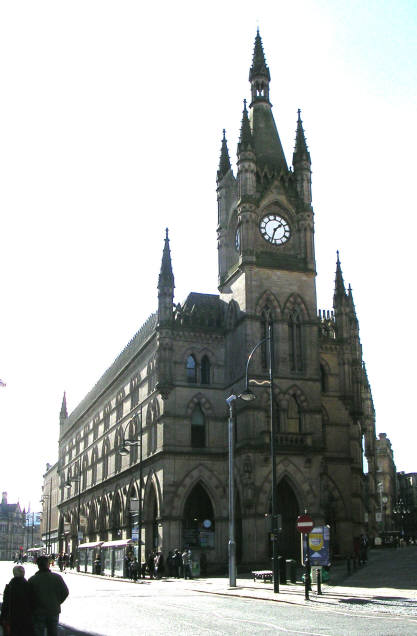
Bradford Wool Exchange

Lockwood and Mawson were very busy during this period and designed many prominent buildings in Bradford including Bradford City Hall in open competition and the Wool Exchange also in open competition. The City Hall opened in 1873. Its most notable feature is the magnificent clock tower which is Italianate inspired by the Palazzo Vecchio in Florence. The Wool Exchange was built between 1864 and 1867 with the foundation being laid by the Prime Minister of the day, Lord Palmerston. It was designed in ornate Venetian Gothic style. Both Bradford City Hall and Wool Exchange are Grade I listed buildings.

Lockwood and Mawson designed many other prominent buildings in Bradford and most of their buildings are still in use with many being listed.

Year	Buildings in Bradford	Listed	
1850	Corn Exchange, Brigg		Demolished 1980s–1990s.
1852	St George's Hall	Grade II	Foundation 27 September 1851. Built of ashlar sandstone masonry in neoclassical style. Completion 27 August 1853.
1852	St Luke's Hospital		Began as Union Workhouse, by L & W. Founded February 1850, many enlargements by L & W at least until 1858. Now demolished but won in open competition by Lockwood and Mawson
1853	Saltaire Mill	Grade II	Foundation 1851, opened 1853 with full description.
1855	47 Well Street, Little Germany, Bradford	Grade II	
1857	Marlborough Hall, Halifax	Grade II*	Opened January 1857 in Princess Street as Halifax Mechanics' Institute.
1858	White Swan Hotel, Halifax	Grade II*	Replacement of 16th century White Swan on adjacent site. Foundation 1856.
1859	Saltaire Congregational Church	Grade I	Building is constructed of fine ashlar stone with a Welsh slate roof and leaded mausoleum roof. The semicircular portico with great Corinthian columns supporting the entablature provides the grand entrance to the building. Foundation 28 September 1856.
1859	4 Currer Street, Little Germany	Grade II	
1861	Lumb Lane Mills – James Drummond	Grade II	
1862	Horton Lane Congregational Church		
1862	St Thomas Wigan Street		Consecrated 1862. It was on the corner of Wigan Street and Ashton Street, Bradford (demolished). It was built of delf stone and had a 140 foot spire.
1862	Congregational Church, Harrogate	Grade II	Built as Congregational Church, now named West Park United Reformed Church.
1865	Eye and Ear Hospital		
1865	Cragg Royd, Apperley Bridge – house for Nathaniel Briggs		
1865	Congregational Church, Scarborough		Opened July 1865. It is now St Andrews United Reformed Church.
1866	York House, 25 Manor Row	Grade II	
1867	Wool Exchange	Grade I	The three-storey building has a grand clocktower and was clearly influenced by Flemish Cloth Halls but also other elements are as clearly Venetian Gothic.
1867	Great Northern (Victoria Hotel)	Grade II	Italian Romanesque detailing to the fenestration and a French pavilion, slightly domed roof.
1868	New Mill, Saltaire	Grade II	Fine Italianate style and constructed in similar materials to Salts Mill. The ornate chimney that is situated between the two blocks of the mill is modelled on the campaniles of the church of Santa Maria Gloriosa dei Frari in Venice.
1868	Saltaire School – Shipley College	Grade II	
1868	1–10 Lockwood Street, Saltaire	Grade II	Terrace of improved workers' houses
1868	1–10 Mawson Street, Saltaire	Grade II	Improved workers' houses (terrace)
1871	Saltaire Institute – Victoria Hall	Grade II	Its central square tower with pyramidal roof soars above the terraces of adjacent streets.
1871	De Vere House, 62 Vicar Lane, Little Germany Bradford	Grade II*	
1871	Bradford Town Hall	Grade I	City Hall's most notable feature is the magnificent clock tower that soars 220 feet above the skyline. The City Hall clock tower is Italianate, inspired by the Palazzo Vecchio in Florence. It has thirteen bells which were installed at a cost of £5,000.
1873	Legrams Mill, Legrams Lane – George Hodgson	Grade II	Imposing 4½ storey spinning mill with 26 bay elevation to Legrams Lane. Italianate detail relating to the partnership's work at Saltaire. Sandstone "brick" with ashlar dressings
1871	Roberts Park, Saltaire	Grade II	Opened as People's Park/Saltaire Park
1873	Sion Baptist Church, Harris Street	Grade II	
1873	Feversham Street Board School	Grade II*	An expensive Gothic Revival style design with Early English details.
1874	Law Russell, 63 Vicar Lane, Little Germany	Grade II*	
1874	Canopy of the statue of Sir Titus Salt	Grade II	Now in Lister Park
1877	Union Club, 3 Piece Hall Yard	Grade II	Fine quality of masonry. Gothic and Romanesque details
1877	"University Management Centre", Emm Lane	Grade II	Deliberately asymmetrical, it has an impressive entrance tower and two multi-gabled wings containing tall arched windows.
1878	Kirkgate Market		Demolished in 1973
1878	Old Bradford Liberal Club		The entrance to Bank Street is flanked by imposing buildings of 1876–78, those on the left (the Talbot Hotel) designed by Andrews and Pepper and those on the right (the Old Bradford Liberal Club buildings) by Lockwood and Mawson.
	Listed Buildings in Other Towns/Cities		
1874	Church of St Stephen, Richmond on Thames	Grade II	
1874	Drighlington Primary School	Grade II	
1877	Arkwright Building, Nottingham Trent University	Grade II	
1878	Church of St Mary in the Wood (Congregational)	Grade II	
1852	Former Congregational Chapel, Leeds	Grade II	
1864	Church of St Andrew (United Reformed), Scarborough	Grade II*	
1874	Buckstone Hall, Rawdon	Grade II	

== Bibliography ==
- Jackson, N; Lintonbon, J; Staples, B: (2010): 'Saltaire: The Making of a Model Town', Spire Books, ISBN 9781-904 965213
- Brodie, A (ed), 'Directory of British Architects, 1834–1914; Vol 2 (L-Z) British Architect Library, Royal Institute of British Architects.
- Robinson, A.H., 1971, 'Lockwood and Mawson. The Story of a Great Partnership." Bradford Bystander 1971
