= Henry Francis Lockwood =

English architect (1811–1878)

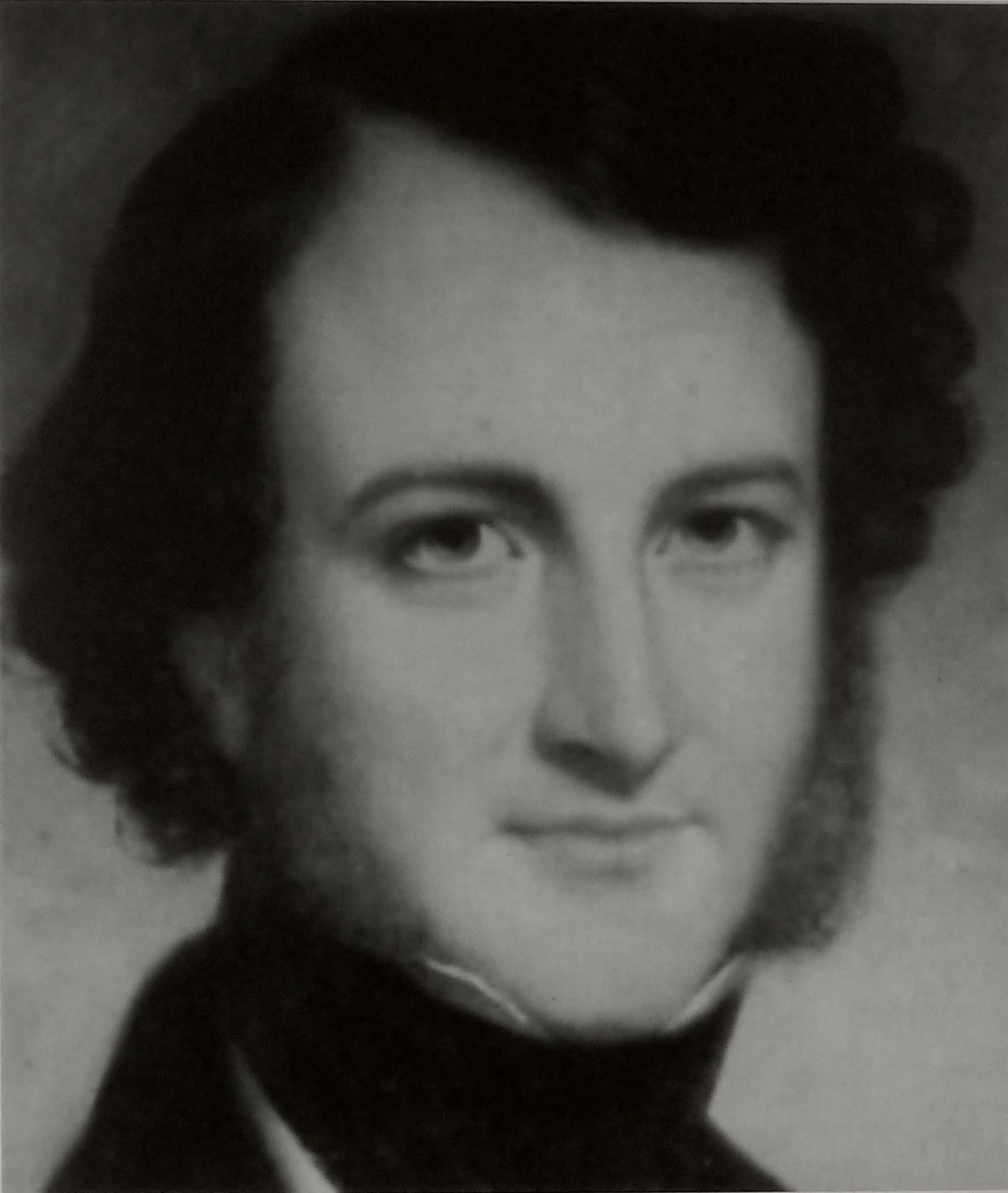
- Henry Francis Lockwood
- Born: 18 September 1811; Doncaster
- Died: 21 July 1878 (aged 66); Richmond, Surrey
- Occupation: Architect
- Spouse: Emma Dey (1810–1882)
- Practice: Lockwood & Allom; Lockwood & Mawson
- Buildings: St George's Hall, 1852; Wool Exchange, 1867; Bradford City Hall, 1873
- Projects: Layout of Saltaire, 1876

Henry Francis Lockwood (18 September 1811, Doncaster – 21 July 1878, Richmond, Surrey) was an influential English architect active in the North of England.

== Family ==
Lockwood was from a successful Doncaster family. His grandfather, Joseph Lockwood (c1758-1837) was twice mayor of Doncaster and part-owner of the limestone quarries at Levitt Hagg, as was his father, also Joseph (1785-1842), who was also a stonemason and builder.

He was the uncle of Sir Frank Lockwood QC (1846–1897), and the great grandfather of the film actress Margaret Lockwood (1916–1990). Another nephew was Louis Lockwood (1864-1907) who was a successful architect in St. Paul, Minnesota. A more distant cousin was Sir Joseph Flawith Lockwood (1904–1991) the Chairman of EMI.

Lockwood married his first cousin Emma Dey (1810–1882). Charles Day (boot blacking manufacturer), who made a colossal fortune through the Day and Martin company, was uncle to both of them (their mothers were Day's sisters), and they received various inheritances originating from his wealth. Their ten children were all named 'Day' as a middle name: Emma (1833), Charles (1834), Henry (1836), Arthur (1838), Rosa (1840), Horace (1842), Frederick (1845), Florence (1849), Francis (1851), and Blanche (1853).

Henry Lockwood and his family lived for many years at Nun Wood, Apperley Bridge, Yeadon, but after 1871 moved to Heron Court, Richmond, Surrey, where he died aged 66 on Sunday, 21 July 1878. He is buried in Kensal Green Cemetery (a few metres behind Blondin of Niagara Falls fame). Emma Lockwood died aged 72 on Christmas Day 1882

== Life and work ==
=== Training ===
Henry Francis Lockwood was articled in London to Peter Frederick Robinson, and given supervision of the extensions to York Castle for which Robinson had been appointed architect in 1826. In 1834 Lockwood published jointly with Adolphus H Cates, The History and Antiquities of the Fortifications to the City of York. The architect Cuthbert Brodrick served his articles with Lockwood in Hull, but later declined an offer of a partnership.

=== Partnership with Thomas Allom ===
In 1834 Lockwood set up a practice in Hull, where in partnership with Thomas Allom he designed a number of Neo-classical buildings, such as Hull Trinity House (1839), extensions to Hull Royal Infirmary (1840) and Great Thornton Street Church (1843); the pair also designed the expansion of the Brownlow Hill workhouse in Liverpool (1842-1843). The partnership with Allom ended by mutual consent on 30 December 1843.

=== Partnership with William Mawson ===
In 1849 Lockwood formed a partnership with William Mawson, and the following year they moved to Bradford where they were later joined by Mawson's brother, Richard. Lockwood and Mawson designed some of the most distinguished buildings in Bradford, including St George's Hall (1851-2), the Venetian Gothic Wool Exchange (1864-7), and the Continental Gothic Revival City Hall (1869–73). They also laid out and designed the mill, model town and church at Saltaire (1851–76), all in an Italianate Classical style. At the time, Saltaire was one of the most important examples of a philanthropic industrial and housing development in the world. Lockwood is mentioned in most accounts of Sir Titus Salt and Saltaire. Drummond Mill in Manningham was likewise designed by Lockwood and Mawson. They also submitted designs in many competitions, including the contest for the Law Courts in the Strand, London (1866–67).

After 1871, Lockwood moved to London where he designed the Methodist City Temple at Holborn Viaduct (originally 1874 but rebuilt after World War II), the Church of St Stephen, Cowbridge Park, East Twickenham (1874) and the Civil Service Stores, Strand (1876). Lockwood and Mawson were also appointed architects for the new buildings at Merchant Taylors' School, Crosby (1874). H F Lockwood was the first President of the Bradford Society of Architects and Surveyors (BSAS) when it was founded in 1874.

Burgess (1998) provides a thorough account of Lockwood's career, with a full catalogue of his architecture and an evaluation of its importance.

== Buildings ==
- Saltaire
- The Old Police Station, Howden
- Hull Trinity House

=== Gallery of architectural work ===
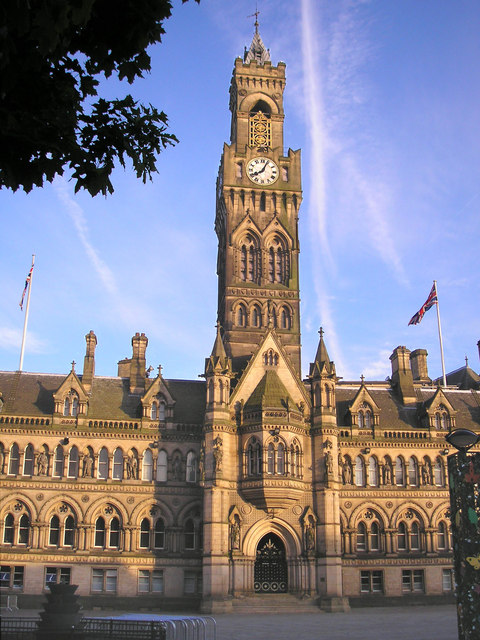
Bradford City Hall

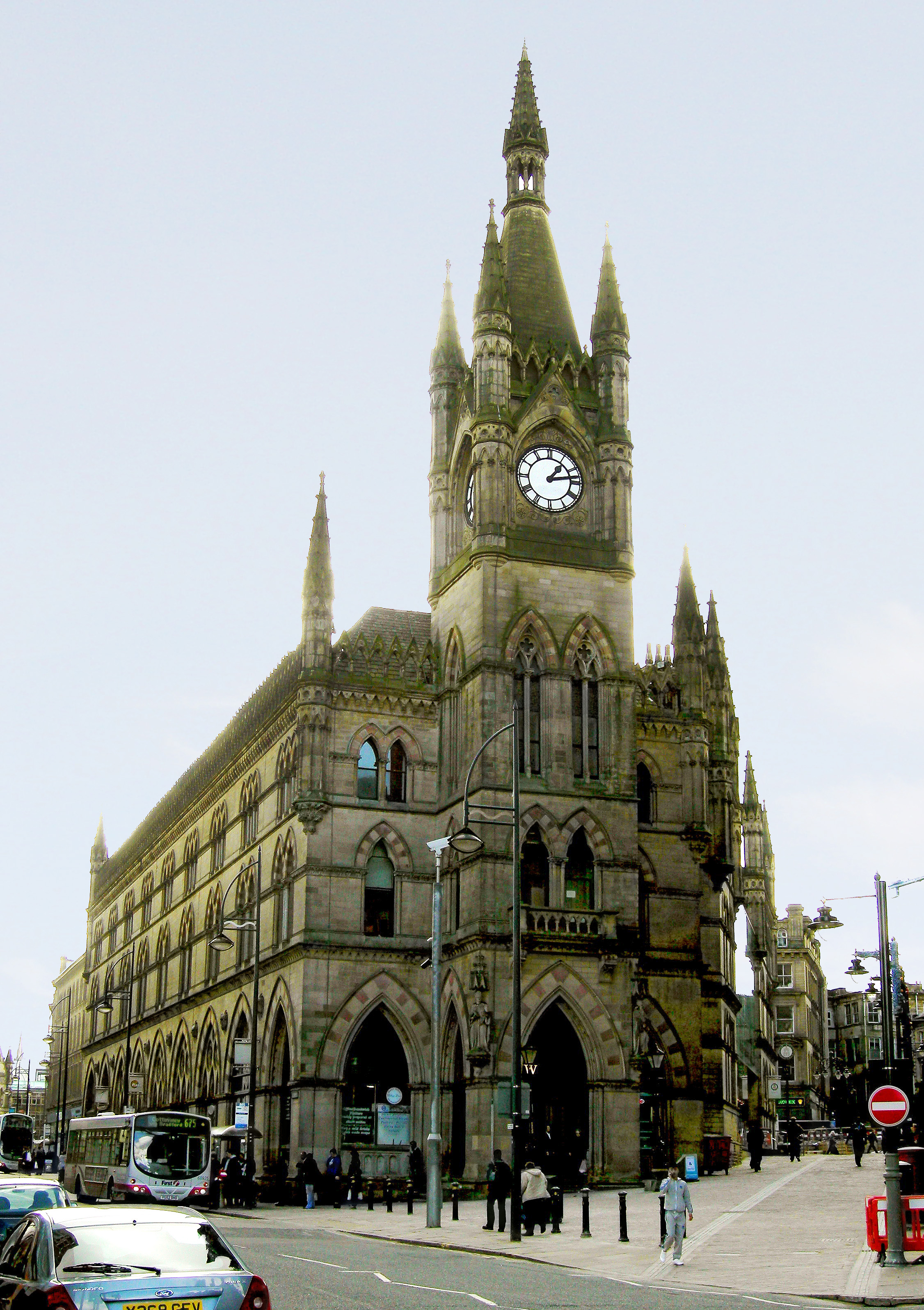
Bradford Wool Exchange

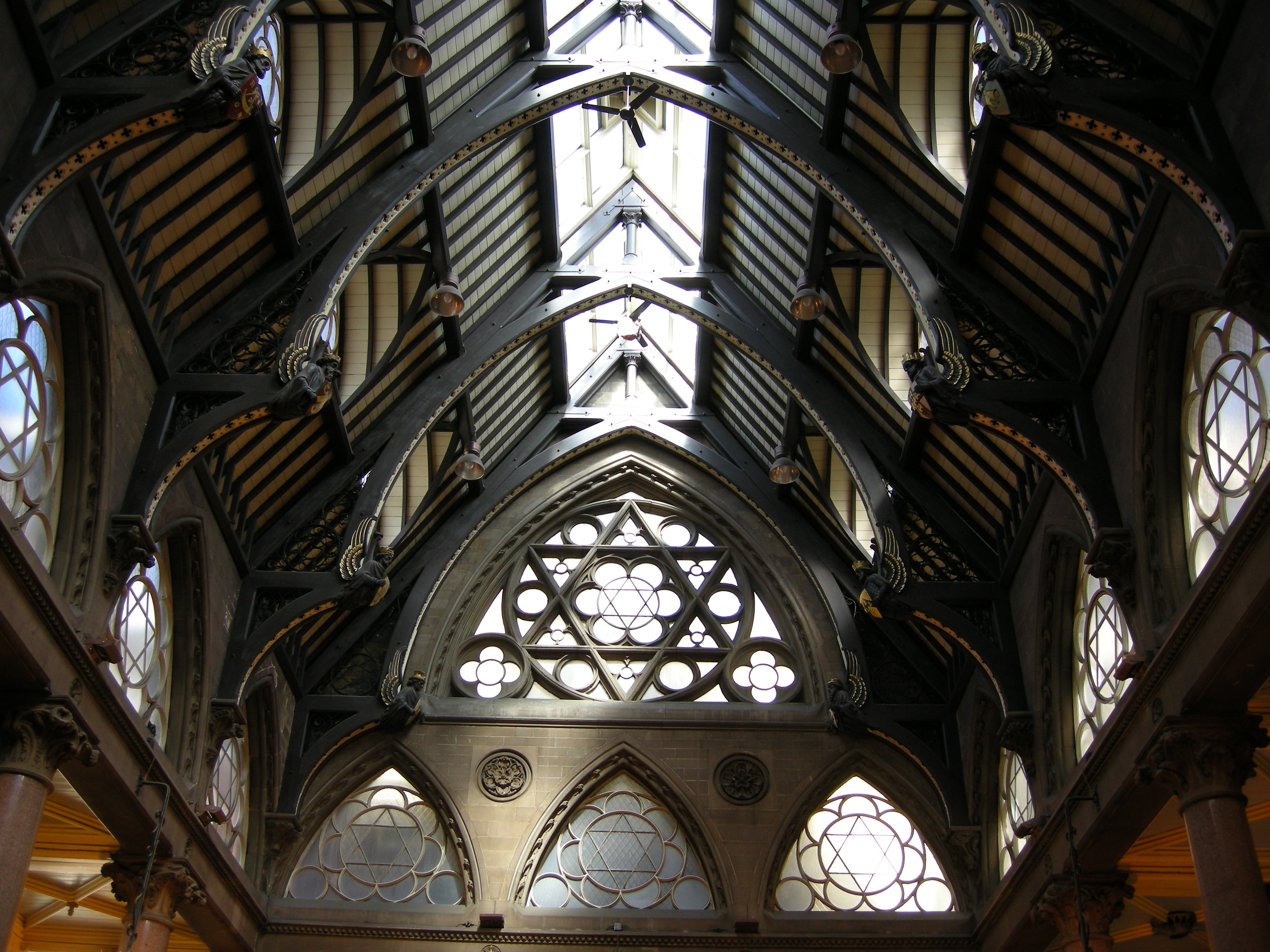
The interior, Bradford Wool Exchange

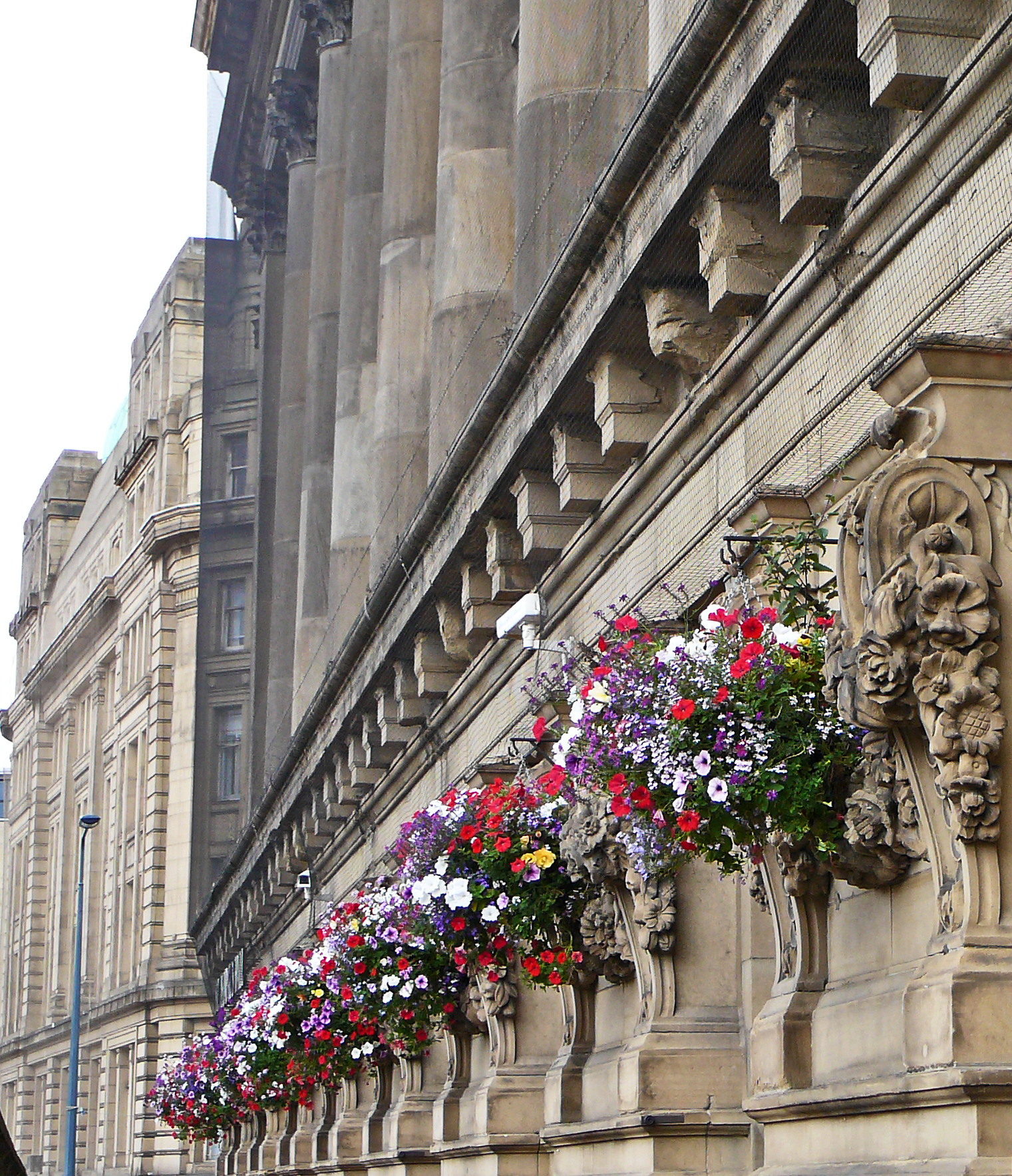
Detail St. George's Hall, Bradford

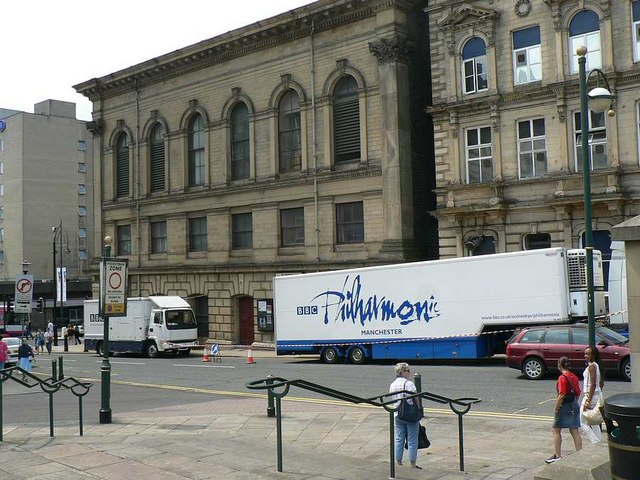
Rear, St. George's Hall, Bradford

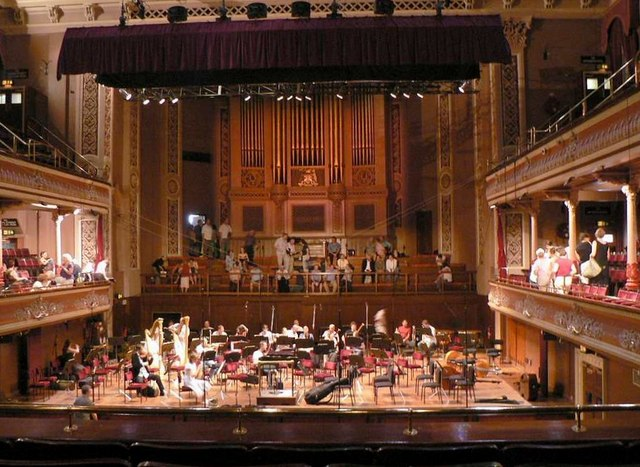
Interior, St. George's Hall, Bradford

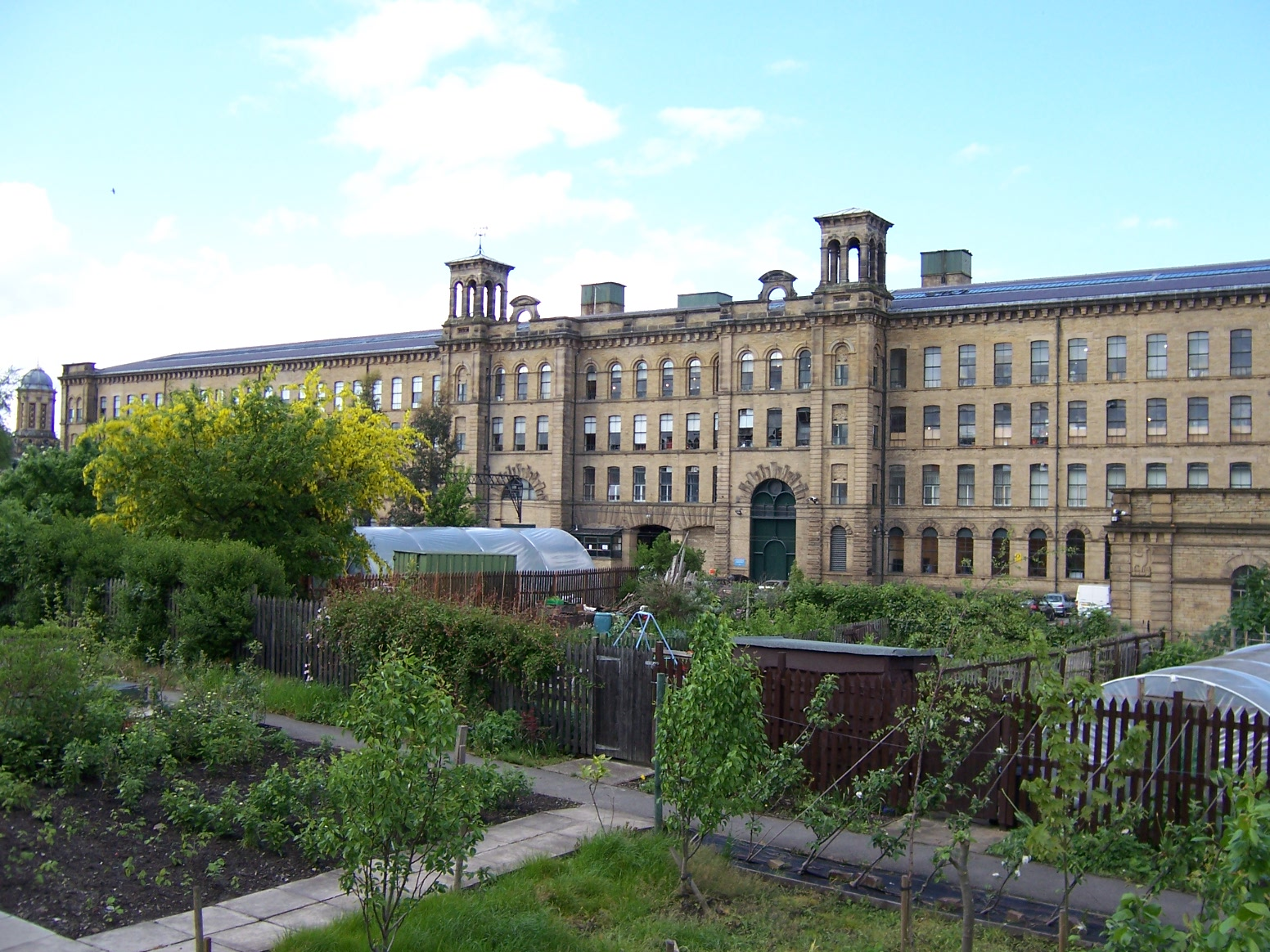
Salt's Mill, Saltaire

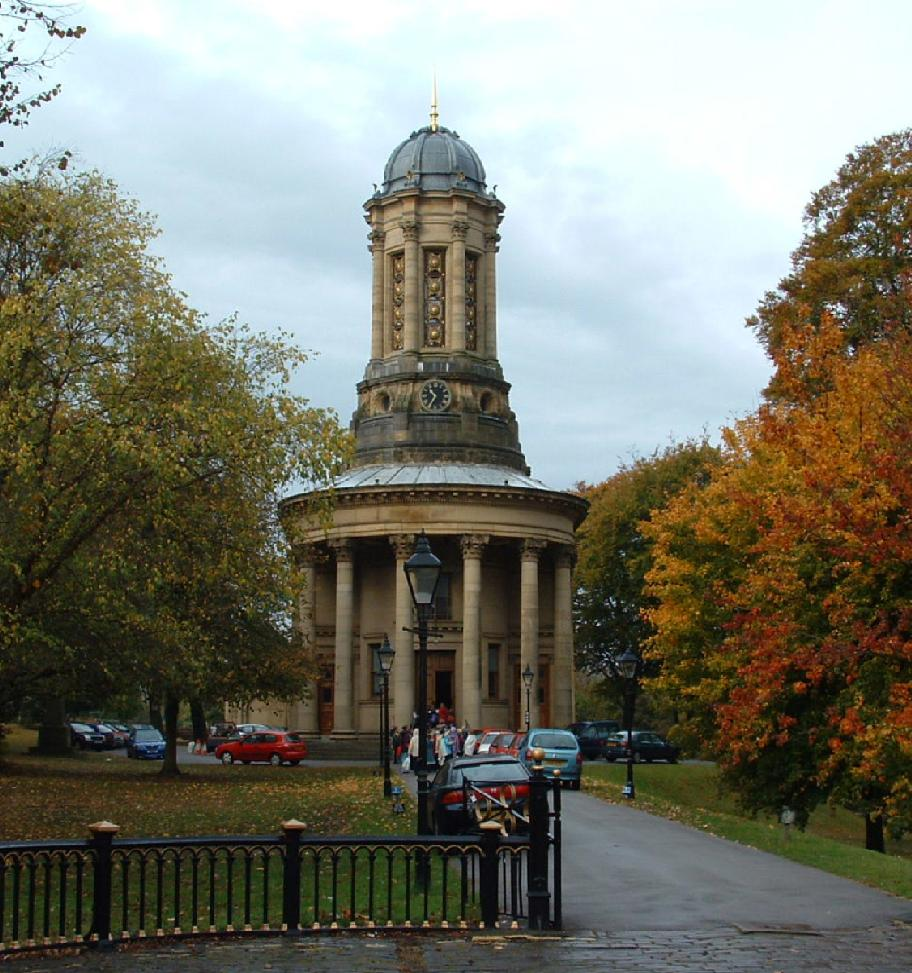
Congregational Church, Saltaire

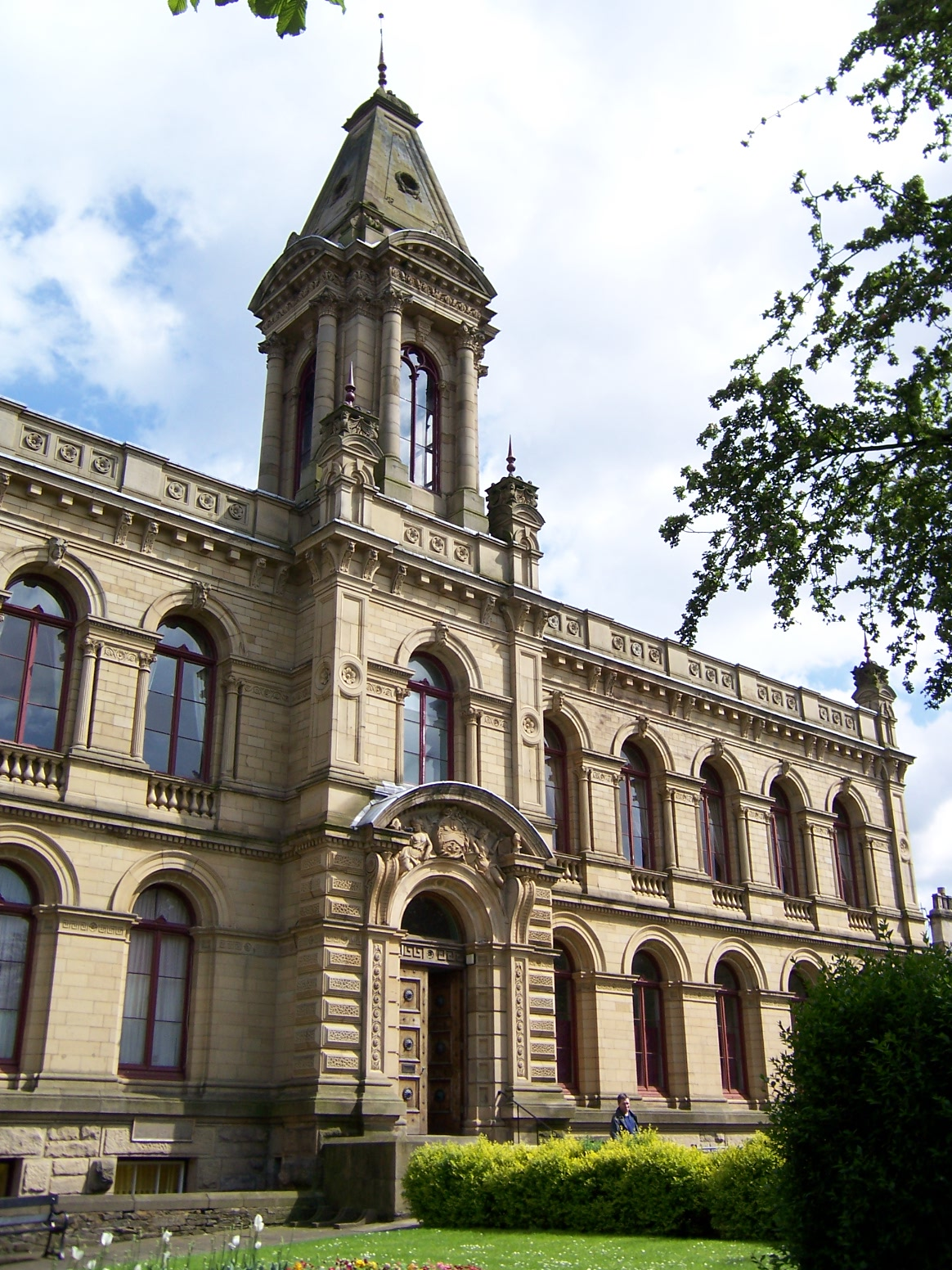
Victoria Hall, Saltaire

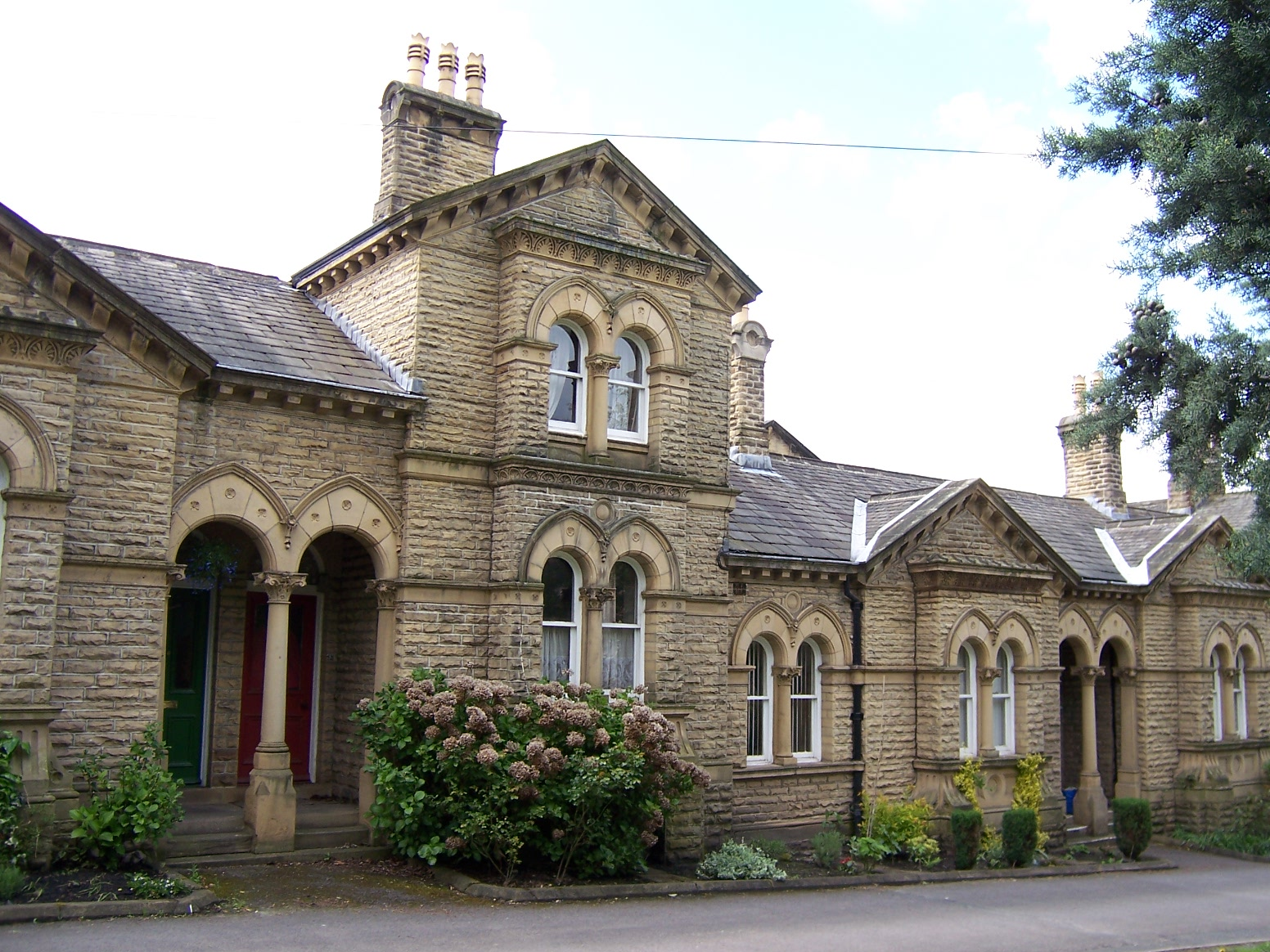
Almshouses, Saltaire

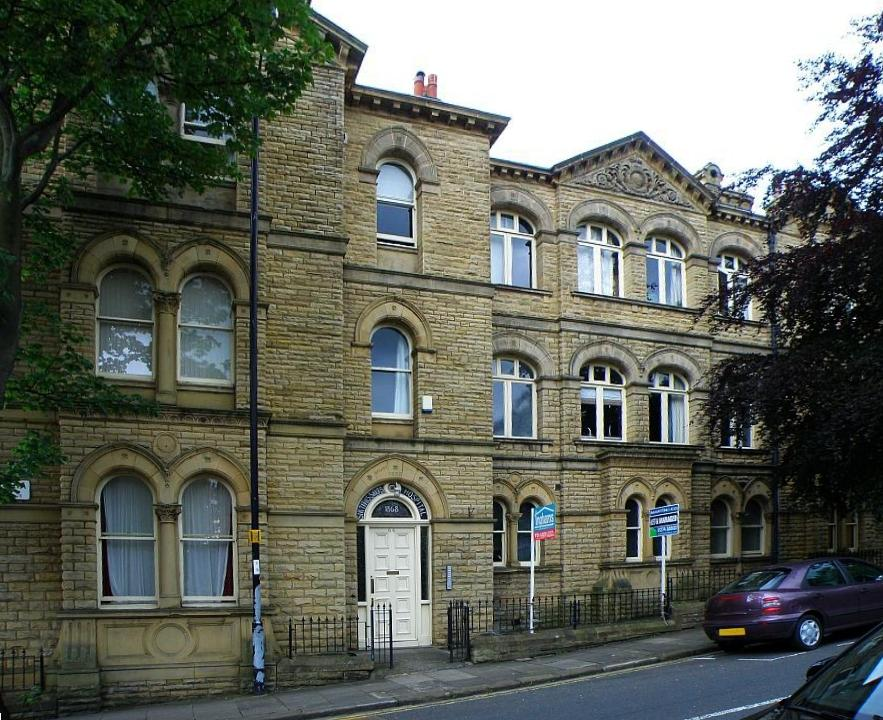
Former Hospital, Saltaire

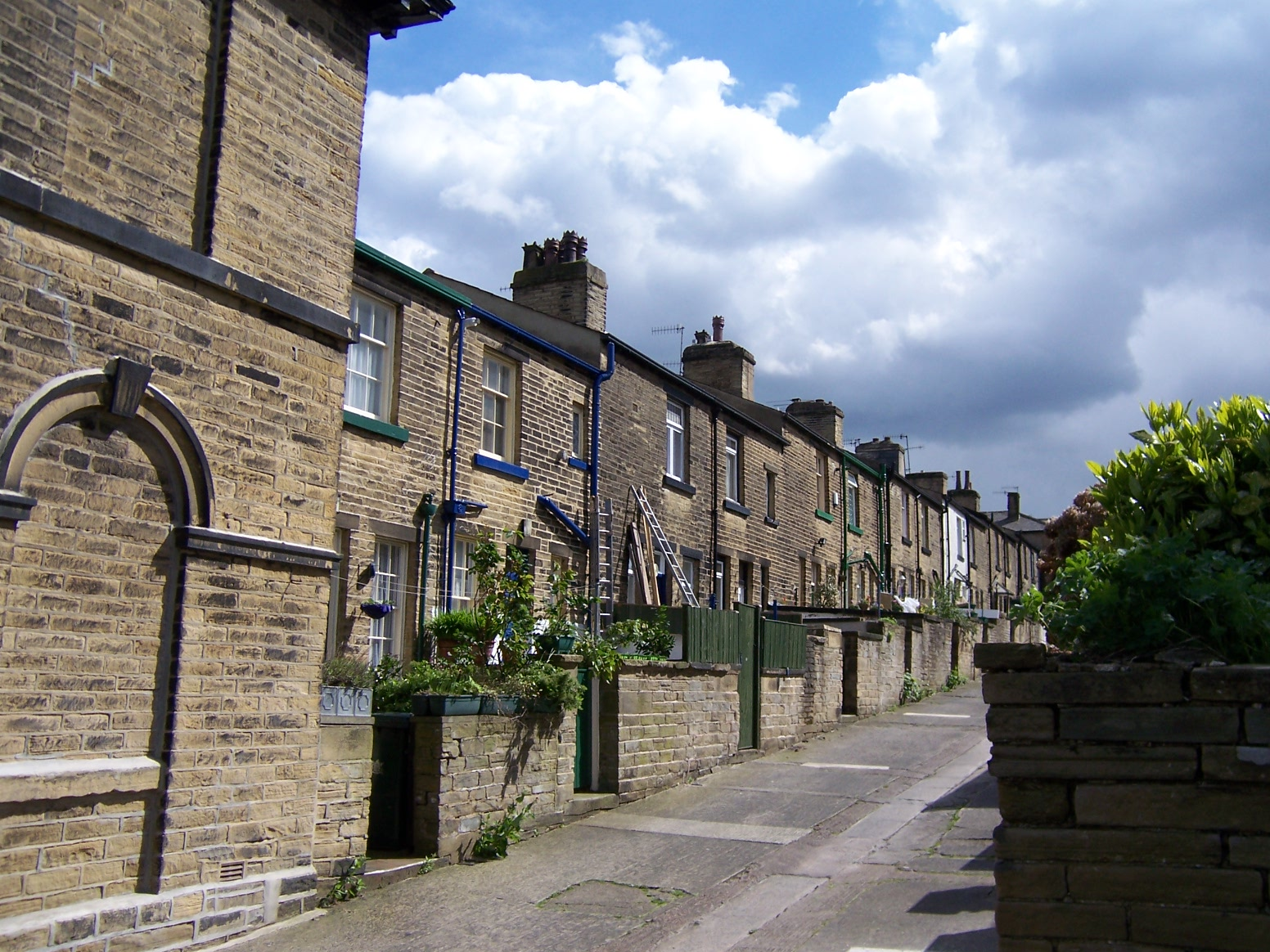
Typical housing, Saltaire

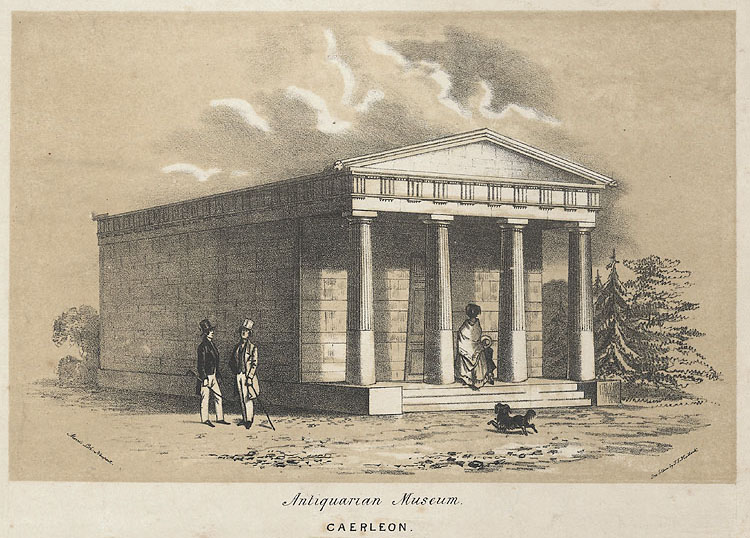
Caerleon Antiquarian Museum of 1850

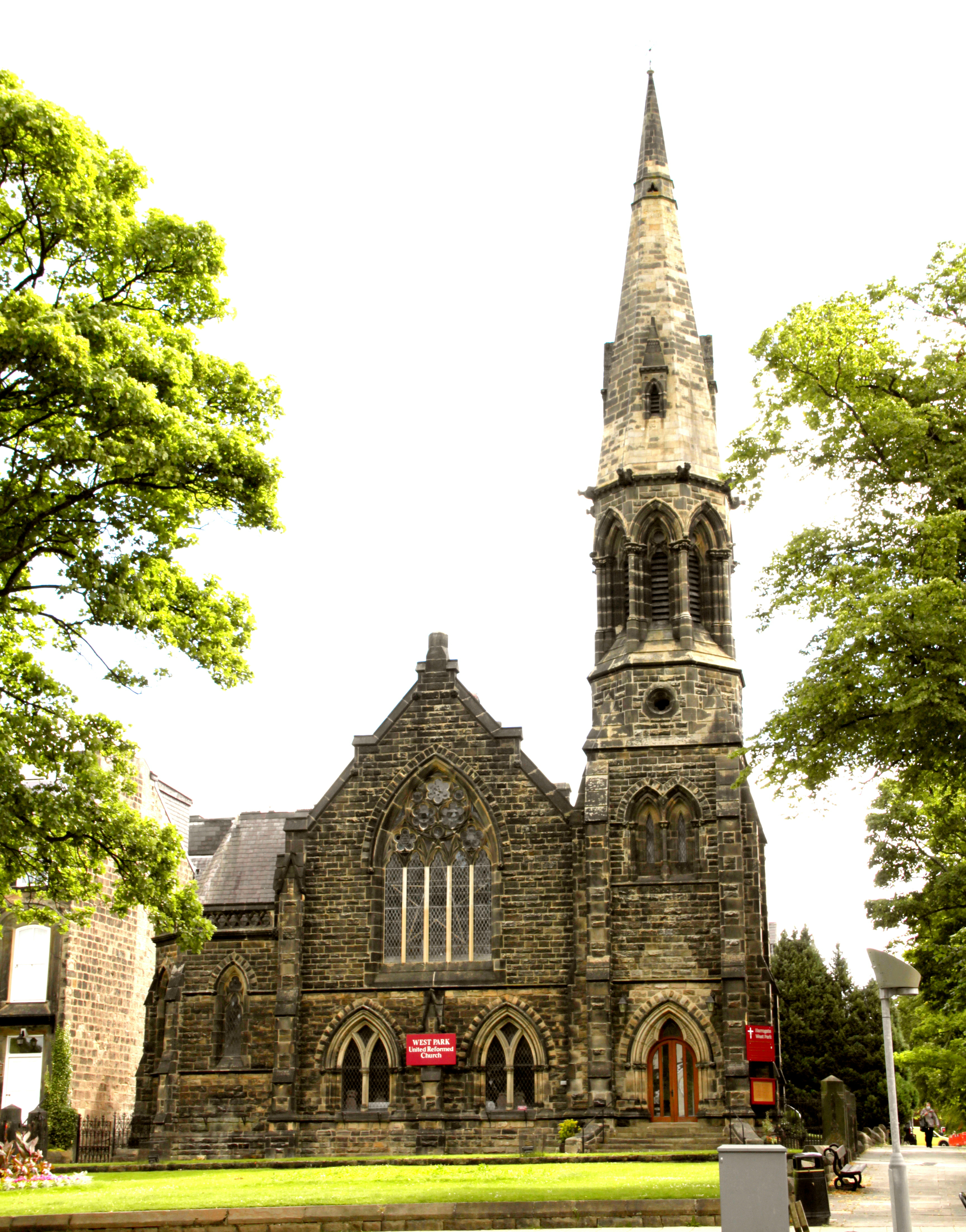
West Park United Reformed Church, Harrogate
