= Little Horton =

Coordinates: 53.785°N 1.777°W

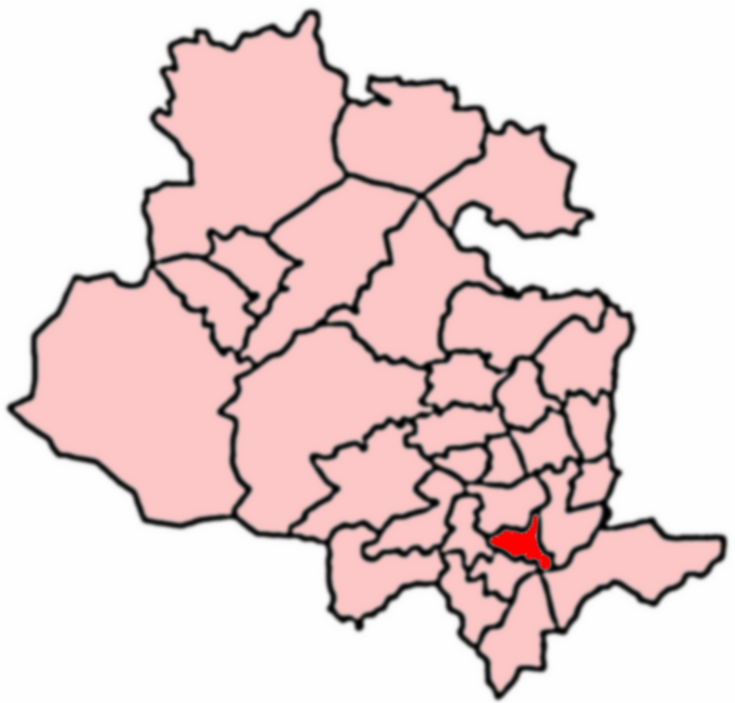
- 2004 Boundaries of Little Horton Ward
- Population: 21,547 (Ward 2011)
- UK Parliament: Bradford East
- Councillors: Fareeda Mir (Labour); Taj Salam (Labour); Talat Sajawal (Bradford Independent Group)

Little Horton (population 17,368 – 2001 UK census) is a ward in the City of Bradford Metropolitan District Council in the county of West Yorkshire, England, named after the de Horton family, who were once Lords of the Manor. The population at the 2011 Census was 21,547.

As well as the area of Little Horton, the electoral ward includes the area of West Bowling, Marshfields and the Canterbury housing estate.

== Introduction ==
Little Horton is located on gently sloping land to the southeast of Bradford. The area has an ancient history and is a pre-industrial settlement. It was originally an area of farmland, but the soil was so poor that arable crop farming was nearly impossible, making manufacturing and trade the keystone of the economy.

The place-name Horton is a common one in England. It derives from Old English horu 'dirt' and tūn 'settlement, farm, estate', presumably meaning 'farm on muddy soil'. The ‘Little’ part of the title only refers to the fact that ‘Little Horton’ covered a smaller area of land than ‘Great Horton’. The two areas together made up the Manor of Horton.

Little Horton has a multi-cultural history dating back to the 11th century. The area known as Horton has been populated in the distant past by the Angles, Norse, Danish and Norman French, as well as possibly before this by people of Celtic origin. The de Hortons became Lords of the Manor of Horton about 1294. Robert de Stapleton took the name Horton, when King Henry II granted him the land as a reward for services to the Crown. The title Lord of the manor passed to several eminent Bradford families over the years, finally returning to the Horton family in 1640. The last of the Horton family to have the title ‘Lord of the manor’ was Charles Horton Rhys in the early 19th century.

In more recent times there is evidence of German cloth merchants coming to the area. People from the rural areas of Britain and immigrants from Ireland were drawn to Bradford and the Little Horton area in the mid-19th century, during the Industrial Revolution, to work in the growing industries.

In the 20th century, people from the former Eastern Bloc countries, for example Poland, Latvia, Serbia and Russia, as well as people from India, Pakistan, Bangladesh and Caribbean countries, settled in Little Horton. Some of these, for example the Serbs, came as refugees and asylum seekers, others came solely to achieve economic advancement by working in the mills and related industries.

== Pre-industrial age ==
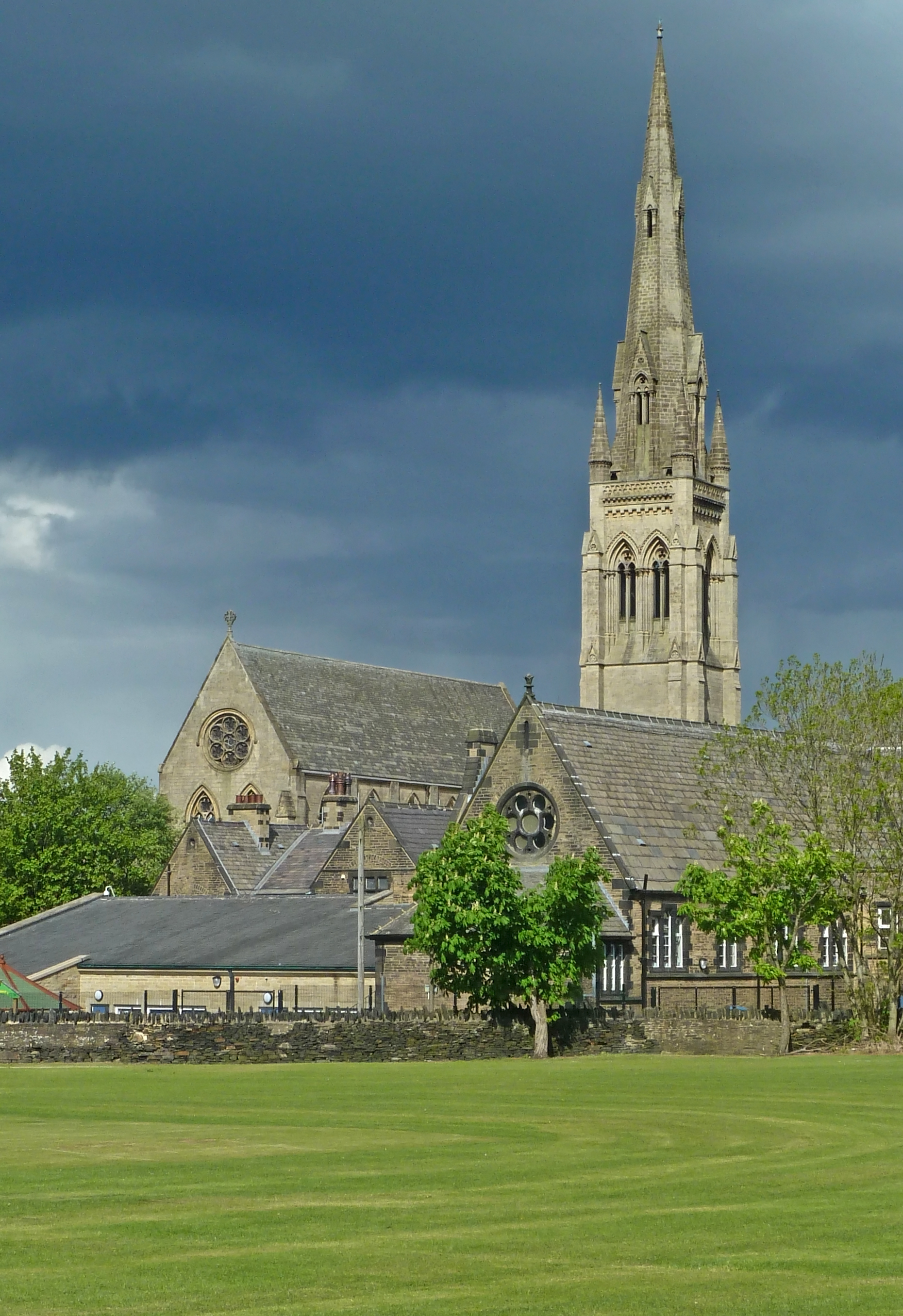
All Saints' Church

In the area known as ‘Little Horton Green’ there are still a number of farmhouses and out buildings, indicating that this was once a farming district.

Typical three-storey weavers' cottages may be seen opposite the farms. These were used initially to weave not wool, but cotton, by a man called Samuel Swaine in the 18th century. The house and barn, with the date stone 1755, were used for the manufacture and sale of cotton by a Mr Kay in the late 18th and very early 19th centuries.

In the pre-industrial age, each manor had a poorhouse where the destitute could go for poor relief. The poorhouse at Little Horton was one of the first buildings in the area and can still be seen today. It is now a house and was replaced by the much larger Bradford Workhouse (now St Luke's Hospital) in 1855.

There were two manor houses in Little Horton, Horton Old Hall and Horton Hall. The two halls existed, because the Sharp family who had ownership of Little Horton for many years, were on different sides during the English Civil War (1642–1655) and as a result erected a second major dwelling in the area, divided from the ‘Old Hall’ by a huge wall.

In the early 20th century Horton Hall was used as the residence of the Bishop of Bradford. Both halls were situated opposite All Saints' Church and were demolished amid much public outcry in the 1960s.

All Saints’ Church was built in 1864, by the local landowner and MP Sir Francis Sharp-Powell, who once lived in Horton Hall.

Prior to the 19th century, Little Horton was still a very rural area, and a place where wealthy merchants and entrepreneurs chose to live to escape the increasing industrialisation of the city centre. However, by the end of the 19th century most of the fields had disappeared and the area was surrounded by row upon row of back to back terrace housing, for the people who flocked to Bradford to work in the manufacturing industries.

== Industrial age ==
=== Population increase ===
The population of Bradford increased hugely in the 19th century. This huge increase in numbers brought with it disease, hardship and a short life expectancy for most of the population. Young children in particular had a terrible time, few survived infancy and those in the poorer families who did, were sent to work long shifts in the mills as soon as they were able to do so, which was usually around four years of age. Conditions were terrible, fifteen-hour days were common, with no food breaks and little rest. Many children suffered from deformities caused by hard labour in the mills. Education was not an option for the majority of children.

=== Working conditions ===
The mill owner John Wood was exceptional among employers in the district, in that he provided health care, basic schooling and limited the hours a child could work in his factories. Richard Oastler stayed at Horton Hall with John Wood in September 1830 and Wood made Oastler (who was also instrumental in the fight to abolish slavery) swear on a Bible, that he would campaign for better conditions for children and other employees in the mills and factories of industrial Britain. This Oastler duly did, campaigning under the banner of ‘Yorkshire Slavery’. As a result, eventually the Factories Act 1844 was passed, which limited the hours that could be worked by children in the mills.

There were many business people and land owners in the Little Horton area, who as well as employing Oastler's 'Yorkshire Slaves' also traditionally had links with the transatlantic slave trade. Mary Skelton of Little Horton left her share in a plantation, Yorkshire Hall, in Demerara, along with all its negroes and slaves, to her three sons. This was in 1823, ten years before an Act was passed that outlawed slavery in the British colonies.

=== Schools ===
Next to All Saints' Church on Little Horton Green is All Saints' School. This is an early church elementary school, which was established as a result of Forster's Elementary Education Act 1870. The act encouraged both the Church of England and local councils to provide schools for all children of elementary age (under fourteen years of age). Forster was MP for Bradford, and his efforts to make schooling compulsory for all children helped make Bradford a pioneer in education.

Bradford Council formed a school board which had the task of establishing ‘board schools’ to supplement the schools provided by the church authorities. School boards were elected by people in the local area. One of the elected members of the school board in Bradford was Margaret McMillan. Margaret McMillan was responsible for setting up a system that checked the health of children in the elementary schools, she was also instrumental in encouraging physical education to be included as part of the curriculum and in convincing the local school board to provide school meals for children in their care. Margaret McMillan was committed to promoting the benefits of nursery education and established the first nurseries in the country in Bradford. She argued that the early years of a child's life were the most important in education. The Teacher Training College, situated in Little Horton on Trinity Road, was named in memory of this pioneer of education and is known as the Margaret McMillan Building.

== Religion ==
Even in the pre-industrial age, Little Horton had a reputation for religious diversity. There were many Presbyterian and other non-conformist chapels and churches in the area, for example the Methodist Church and the Baptist Church on Little Horton Lane. An old church now houses the YMCA, and the Methodist Church has become the Serbian Orthodox Church. The Anglican church of All Saints' was built in 1894, with the money of F. S. Powell who lived at Horton Hall. This elaborate building is an example of the wealth and success of Bradford's Victorian industrialists.

Today the history of religious diversity continues. There are Muslim mosques, Hindu mandirs, a Moravian church, black Pentecostal churches, Eastern European churches, an Orthodox church, a Unitarian church, a Quaker Meeting House and a range of chapels in the Little Horton area.

== Population changes ==
The changes in the population during the late 19th and 20th century have had a major impact on the character of Little Horton. The area is home to a very diverse, multi-ethnic, multicultural, multi-faith community with a British Pakistani majority.

Distinct, close-knit communities of Poles, Ukrainians, Hungarians and Lithuanians settled in Little Horton during and after the Second World War. Some were refugees, others European Voluntary Workers, who though they came initially as temporary workers, soon made their home in Bradford.

The first migrants from South Asia also arrived after the Second World War. A group of Pakistani men who had been merchant seamen were amongst the first in 1944, and they initially lodged with Eastern European migrants in Howard Street.

Gujarati Indian, Pakistani, East African and African Caribbean migrants also settled in the Little Horton area from the mid-1950s onwards. The initial migrants tended to settle in areas in close proximity to one another, living with people who shared a common culture, heritage, language and often religion. These migrants filled the post-war labour shortages in the mills and factories in the city. Typically most were young men who expected to earn money and then return home. For many this became a ‘myth of return’ as they were joined by wives and families, and like earlier migrants made Bradford their home.

All these migrant groups established places of worship, often taking over old buildings. The Polish Catholic Church, the Serbian Orthodox Church and the Jamia Masjid for example, were all established in buildings that had once had other uses.

Food shops and restaurants in Little Horton reflect the diverse nature of the people presently resident in the area. The close proximity of the University and College, with their international student populations also has an influence on the area, for example the emergence of a student quarter at the bottom of Morley Street and Great Horton Road.

== Governance ==
Little Horton electoral ward is represented on Bradford Council by two Labour Party councillors, Fareeda Mir and Taj Salam and one Bradford Independent Group councillors, Talat Sajawal.

Election	Councillor	Councillor	Councillor
2004	Naveeda Ikram (Lab)	Choudhary Rangzeb (Lab)	Ian Greenwood (Lab)
2006	Naveeda Ikram (Lab)	Choudhary Rangzeb (Lab)	Ian Greenwood (Lab)
2007	Naveeda Ikram (Lab)	Quasim Khan (Lib Dem)	Ian Greenwood (Lab)
2008	Naveeda Ikram (Lab)	Quasim Khan (Lib Dem)	Ian Greenwood (Lab)
2010	Naveeda Ikram (Lab)	Quasim Khan (Lib Dem)	Ian Greenwood (Lab)
2011	Naveeda Ikram (Lab)	Javed Asama (Lab)	Ian Greenwood (Lab)
2012	Naveeda Ikram (Lab)	Javed Asama (Lab)	Alyas Karmani (Respect)
October 2013	Naveeda Ikram (Lab)	Javed Asama (Lab)	Alyas Karmani (Ind)
2014	Naveeda Ikram (Lab)	Javed Asama (Lab)	Alyas Karmani (Ind)
March 2015	Naveeda Ikram (Lab)	Javed Asama (Lab)	Alyas Karmani (Respect)
May 2015	Naveeda Ikram (Lab)	Taj Mubarik Salam (Lab)	Alyas Karmani (Respect)
2016	Naveeda Ikram (Lab)	Taj Salam (Lab)	Talat Sajawal (Bradford Independent Group)

indicates seat up for re-election. indicates councillor defection.

== See also ==
- Listed buildings in Bradford (Little Horton Ward)
- Listed buildings in Bradford (Trident Parish)

== Sources ==
- Bradford Metropolitan Libraries, Local Studies Department, Central Library, Bradford.
- Cudworth (1886) Rambles Round Horton Mountain Press
- Education Bradford (2006) Bradford's Religious Communities Education Bradford
- Firth. G. (1990) Bradford and the Industrial Revolution
- Firth. G (1997) A History of Bradford Philimone and Co
- Fieldhouse. J (1972) Bradford Longman
- Hanson. A. (2000) Sharp to Blunt Bradford Arts Museum and Library Service
- Wright.D.G & Jowett.J.A (Eds) (1982) Victorian Bradford Bradford City Libraries
