= Bradford smallpox outbreak of 1962 =

Smallpox outbreak in Bradford, England

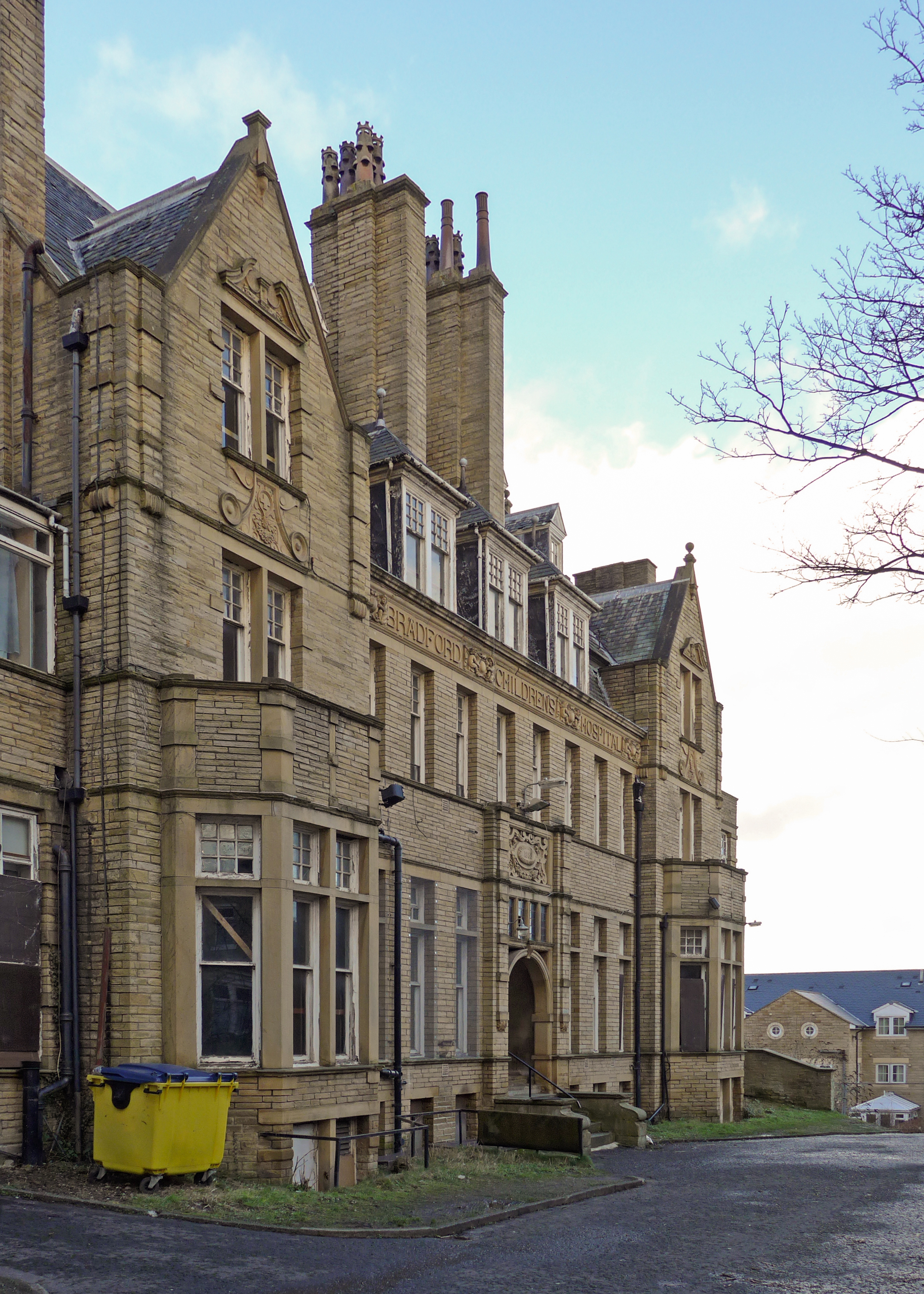
- Bradford Children's Hospital, where the index case was admitted

- Shown within West Yorkshire
- Location: Bradford, UK
- First reported: 11 January 1962
- Index case: Nine year old girl from Karachi
- Arrival date: 16 December 1961
- Date: 1961-12 February 1962
- Type: Smallpox
- Confirmed cases: 14
- Deaths: 6

An outbreak of smallpox in Bradford in 1962 first came to attention on 11 January 1962, when a cook from the children's hospital in Bradford, West Riding of Yorkshire, England, presented with an unexplained fever and was found to have changes in her blood similar to another sick person at the nearby St Luke's Hospital, both samples appearing compatible with smallpox. The index case was later discovered to be a nine-year old girl who arrived in the UK on 16 December 1961 from Karachi, Pakistan, where there was an ongoing epidemic of smallpox.

The outbreak resulted in 14 cases of smallpox and contact tracing of over 1,400 individuals. Within five days either 250,000 or 285,000 people had been vaccinated. Six deaths were directly due to the disease and the outbreak was officially declared over on 12 February 1962.

== Background ==
Between December 1961 and April 1962, authorities became aware of an ongoing epidemic of smallpox in Karachi, where people were able to depart via charter flight and arrive in the UK, where surveillance at airports was enhanced only following the first imported case. At the time, Bradford was a major destination for those seeking work in mills and factories. Of the city's 298,000 people, 1,000 were West Indian, 2,000 from India and 7,500 from Pakistan. In Roberta Bivins' account of the epidemic published in 2015, she described Bradford as having "prided itself on a reputation for tolerance and good intercommunal relations".

On 10 January 1962, a case of smallpox was confirmed in a man who had arrived at Heathrow Airport, London, on Christmas Day. Another suspected case arrived from Pakistan on 19 December 1961. On 1 January 1962, a contact of the first case arrived in Bradford and was immediately isolated. In all, of the five people with smallpox that had arrived at Heathrow from Pakistan, two travelled to Birmingham, one to Cardiff, one to Bradford and one stayed in London. In Bradford's preparedness, a local hospital was designated for further possible cases of smallpox.

== Outbreak ==
On 11 January 1962, shortly after being appointed consultant pathologist at St Luke's Hospital in Bradford, pathologist Derrick Tovey received two almost identical severely abnormal blood samples from two unrelated people who had been admitted with unexplained fevers to two different hospitals, unusually on the same day. One case was Hettie Whetlock, a 49 year old cook from Bradford Children's Hospital, who was under observation at the Leeds Road Fever Hospital. The other was Jack Crossley, a 40-year-old abattoir worker who had been admitted to Tovey's own hospital, St Luke's, and who died shortly after the blood was taken. Tovey described the samples as showing "a mild anaemia, leucopenia, thrombocytopenia and a striking blood film with nucleated red cells, myelocytes, fragmenting granulocytes and vacuolation of the protoplasm, condensed nuclear bodies and atypical plasma cells and some Türck cells". The findings were similar to a description of smallpox made by Kano Ikeda in 1925. After examining the man in the mortuary and without waiting for laboratory confirmation, the diagnosis was assumed and the regional medical officer convened a committee. One nurse and five children from A1 ward at the Bradford Children's Hospital were shortly suspected of having smallpox. One of these children had already been transferred to Wharfedale Hospital for observation. The result was that four hospitals were initially quarantined. All cases were transferred to Oakwell Hospital, the designated isolation hospital in Birstall.

The following day the index case was discovered to be a nine-year old girl who arrived in the UK on 16 December 1961 from Karachi. Her international vaccination certificates were up-to-date and when she was admitted to A1 ward at Bradford's Children's Hospital, her diagnosis and treatment of malaria masked any suspicion of smallpox. She subsequently died on 30 December 1961. During that Christmas period, both Mr Crossley, whose child Jacqueline was an inpatient at the hospital, and Whetlock, visited A1 ward. Norman Ainley, the pathologist who performed the postmortem at the Bradford Royal Infirmary on the nine-year old girl had not been vaccinated, contracted the illness and died within a few days, leaving the Royal Infirmary as the fifth hospital to be quarantined. At Oakwell, two of the five transferred children died. By mid-January, five of the 10 second generation cases died and all of Bradford's hospitals had closed to non-urgent cases.

=== Hospitals involved ===
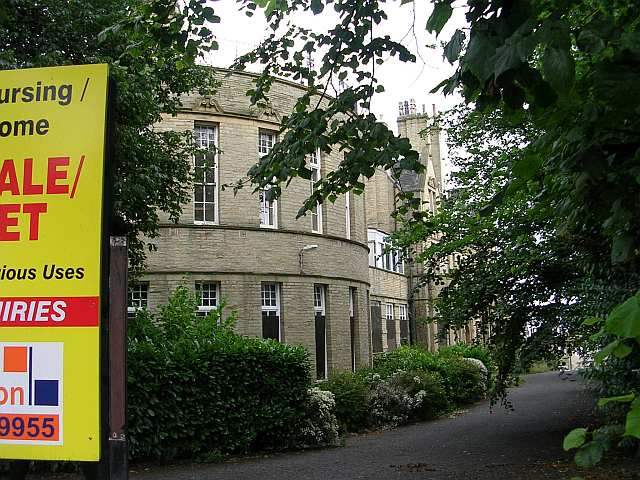
Bradford Children's Hospital

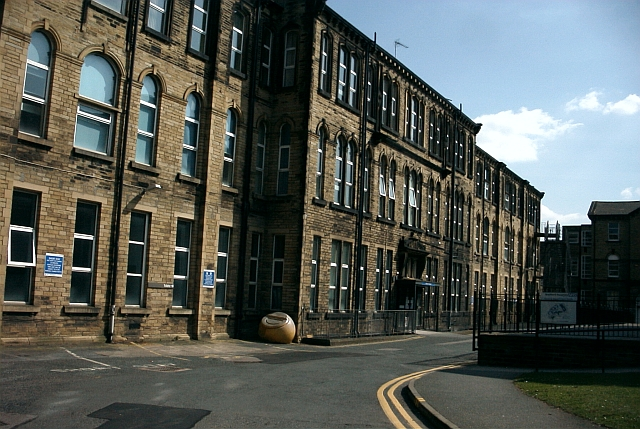
St. Luke's Hospital.

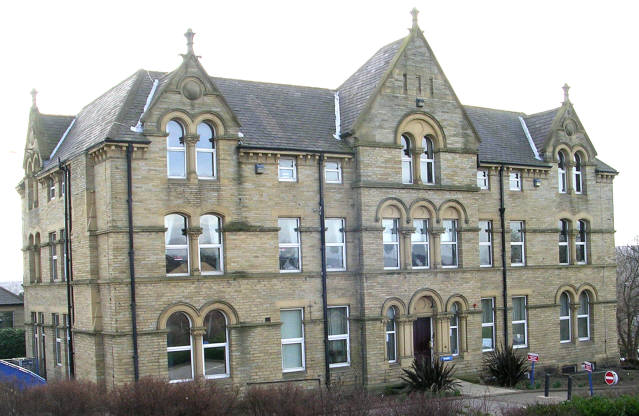
Leeds Road Fever Hospital.

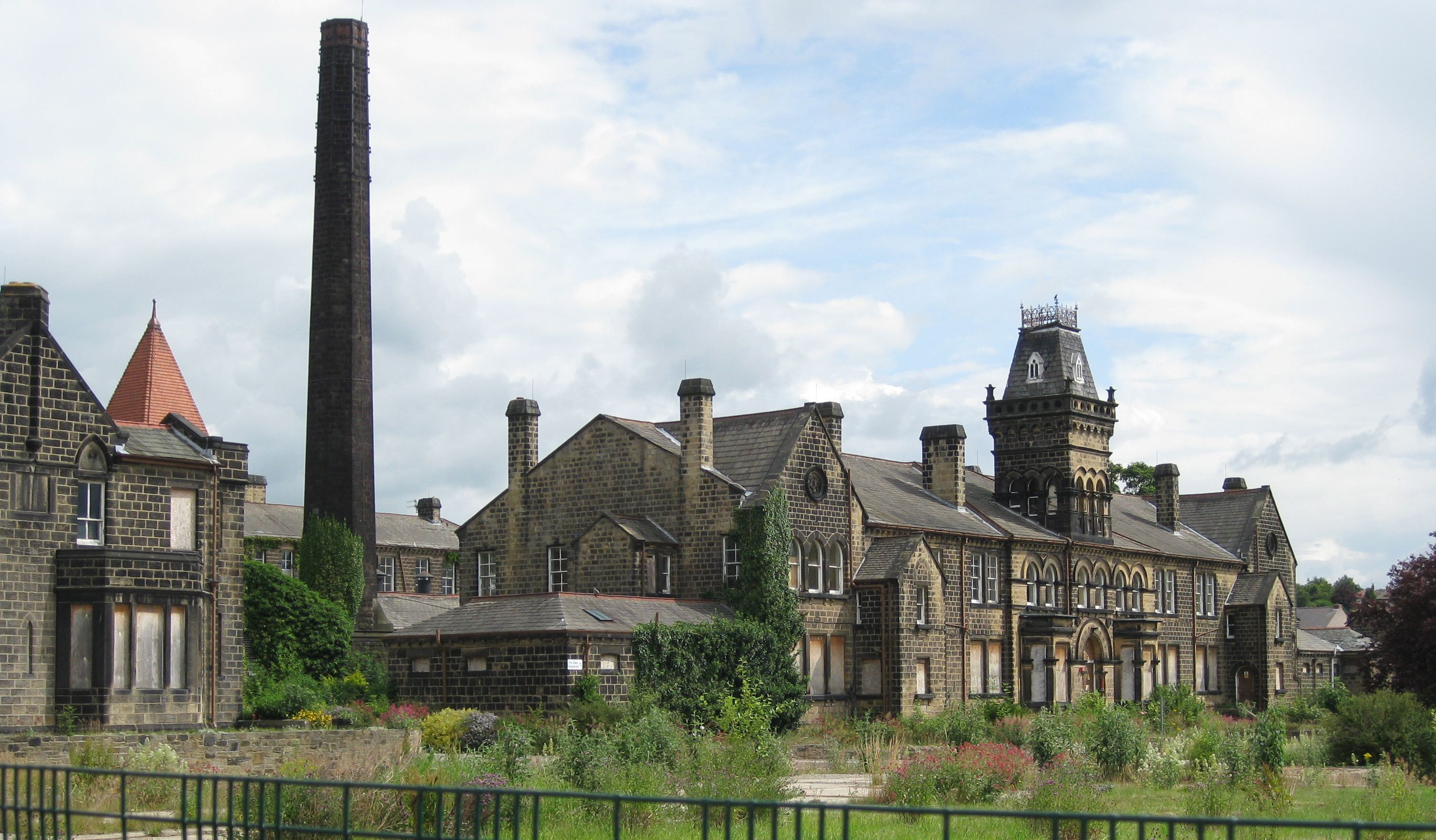
Old Wharfedale Hospital.

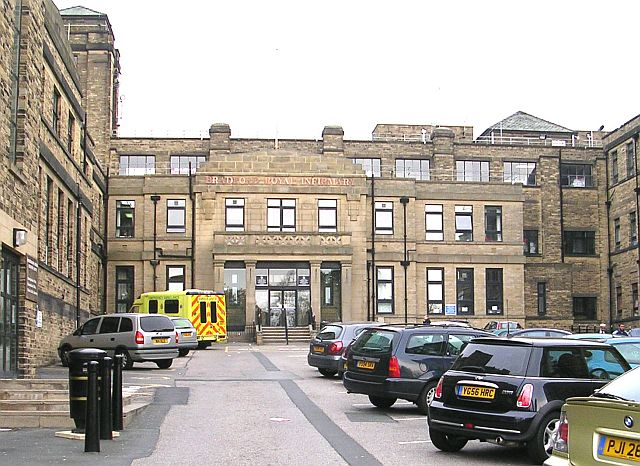
Bradford Royal Infirmary.

== Response ==
=== Contact tracing, vaccination and surveillance ===
The responsibility for tracing contacts, vaccination and surveillance of hospital staff and patients was designated to one medical officer at each hospital. Tovey became the "control of infection" for St. Luke's. Bradford's medical officer of health at the time was John Douglas. Neighbouring authorities were notified within 48 hours. Authorities carried out contact tracing of over 1,400 individuals and public demand led to the vaccination of either 250,000 or 285,000 people over five days, despite as Douglas confirmed in 1962, that "mass vaccination was at no stage recommended". A number of people experienced minor symptoms as side effects from the vaccine; at least six had severe symptoms and one man with pre-existing medical conditions died. One death occurred in a child who had not been vaccinated, but had contracted smallpox after having been in a bath with her recently vaccinated sister.

=== Business ===
The outbreak resulted in the closing of shops with a consequent drop in earnings. Cafes, cinemas and theatres closed and football was postponed.

=== Media ===
On 12 January 1962, the Telegraph & Argus, Bradford's local daily newspaper, reported "Smallpox Fear: 2 Die". The following day after a child had died from smallpox in hospital, the paper reported "Panic measures not needed". Bivins' described that the Argus was "careful not to exaggerate the role of immigration", noted the paper to frequently quote medical authorities, acknowledged that it reported that Pakistani residents were just as vulnerable and that Pakistan itself had been implementing its own vaccination measures. In contrast, papers such as The Yorkshire Post alleged that "most Bradfordians were angry", a claim the Argus denied. The epidemic was covered by Pathé newsreels. With media attention on health checks for immigrants, the outbreak became a focus of discussion in the months leading to the Commonwealth Immigrants Act 1962.

== Outcome ==
Of the 11 cases treated in hospital, one 77 year old man had been vaccinated as a child; the others were unvaccinated. In all, the outbreak resulted in 14 cases of smallpox and six deaths directly due to the disease. It was officially declared over on 12 February 1962. After including the cases in the rest of England and Wales during this time, it was reported that there were 62 local cases of smallpox, 16 in England and 46 in Wales. 40 cases were in hospitals and there were 24 deaths.

== Recollections ==
In 2014, in a letter published in The Telegraph, the person who nursed the girl from Pakistan, recalled that due to it being Christmas "contact between child patients was unusually high because they were carried around the wards to look at Christmas trees and decorations" and upon recognising the outbreak "Everyone in the hospital was immediately quarantined".
