= Kano Ikeda =

Japanese-American pathologist

Kano Ikeda (1887–1960), was a Japanese American professor of pathology who wrote several articles relating to his experience of the 1924–1925 Minnesota smallpox epidemic. Ikeda's 1925 report on laboratory findings in haemorrhage smallpox were used by Derrick Tovey to diagnose early cases of smallpox during the Bradford smallpox outbreak of 1962.

Ikeda was a native of Tokyo, Japan, and came to the United States in 1904. In 1953, he was the first person from Japan to become a U.S. citizen in Minnesota. He worked at Miller Hospital in St. Paul and at the University of Minnesota.

== Selected publications ==
- Ikeda, Kano (13 June 1925). "The Blood in Purpuric Smallpox: Clinical Review of Forty-Eight Cases". Journal of the American Medical Association. 84 (24): 1807–1813. doi:10.1001/jama.1925.02660500015010. ISSN 0002-9955.
- Ikeda, Kano (1 May 1926). "The Blood in Smallpox During A Recent Epidemic". Archives of Internal Medicine. 37 (5): 660–673. doi:10.1001/archinte.1926.00120230065004. ISSN 0730-188X.
- Ikeda, Kano; Foley, Frederic E.B.; Rosenow, John (1 May 1943). "Malignant Priapism: Report of Primary Carcinoma of the Urethra with Priapism". Journal of Urology. 49 (5): 732–744. doi:10.1016/S0022-5347(17)70608-8.
