= Derrick Tovey =

British pathologist

- Born: Lucas Alfred Derrick Tovey; 1926; Bristol, England
- Died: 16 November 2015 (aged 88–89)
- Education: University of Bristol
- Occupation: Pathologist
- Known for: Diagnosing first early cases of smallpox in the Bradford smallpox outbreak of 1962; Introducing routine use in the UK of Anti-D to prevent RhD isoimmunization in mothers who are RhD negative
- Medical career
- Profession: Physician
- Institutions: St Luke's Hospital; Seacroft Children's Hospital
- Sub-specialties: Haematology

Lucas Alfred Derrick Tovey (1926 – 16 November 2015) was a British pathologist who shortly after being appointed consultant at St Luke's Hospital in Bradford, West Yorkshire, England, recognised the first cases of smallpox in the early days of the Bradford smallpox outbreak of 1962. Over the subsequent three days a further eight cases of smallpox were detected and Tovey subsequently became in charge of infection control at St Luke's and given the responsibility of liaising with the medical officers of health and the press. He later attributed the successful containment of the outbreak to effective contact tracing, surveillance and vaccination.

From 1966 to 1988 he was director of the Yorkshire Region Transfusion Centre, and from 1980 to 1988 he was chairman of the anti-D working party Department of Health and Social Security. His contributions led to the routine use of Anti-D to prevent RhD isoimmunization in mothers who are RhD negative in the UK. His data from the Yorkshire Regional Transfusion Centre showed that by introducing anti-D prophylaxis, the number of deaths in newborns due to Rh disease dropped from 66 in 1970 to one by 1989.

== Early life and education ==
Derrick Tovey was born in 1926 in Bristol, where he lived with his parents above their grocery store. Following inspiration as a St John's Ambulance cadet when in his teens, he gained admission to the University of Bristol to study medicine and later took up an appointment as a blood transfusion officer at the Middlesex Hospital, London. His training had been in all branches of general pathology including bacteriology.

== Early career ==
In January 1962, he was a fairly new consultant at St Luke's Hospital, Bradford, having moved with his wife Kay to Yorkshire. On 11 January he received two identical blood samples from two unrelated severely ill people from two different hospitals. After consulting a colleague and looking back through historical texts, he recognised the blood samples as compatible with that seen with smallpox, as reported by Kano Ikeda in 1925. The cases became the first laboratory confirmed cases of smallpox in the 1962 outbreak of smallpox in Bradford. The index case was shortly found to be a nine-year old girl who had died earlier of suspected malaria. Over the next three days a further eight cases of smallpox were detected among four hospitals in Bradford and a convalescent hospital outside the city. Tovey was subsequently put in charge of infection control at St Luke's and given the responsibility of liaising with the medical officers of health and the press. For the next three weeks he would be confined to the hospital under quarantine, while his wife was pregnant with their second child. The outbreak ended the following month following a system of contact tracing, surveillance and vaccination. In his account of the outbreak, published in 2004, he recalled:

This 'success' was due primarily to the fact that a small group of regional and local doctors, nurses and administrators had the authority and drive to introduce immediate measures to tackle the outbreak, to set in motion exhaustive tracing of contacts, and to initiate ring local mass vaccination.

== Later career ==
From St Luke's he took up a post as consultant haematologist at Seacroft Children's Hospital in Leeds. In 1966 he was appointed director of the Yorkshire Region Transfusion Centre, where he remained until 1988, and from 1980 to 1988 he was chairman of the anti-D working party Department of Health and Social Security. It was from Seacroft that he introduced the administration of anti-D immunoglobulin to prevent RhD isoimmunization in mothers who are RhD negative, to prevent Rh haemolytic disease in their newborns. In 1970, around one in 20 pregnant women were affected with the blood disease and approximately one in 1,000 babies died from the disease in England and Wales. By introducing anti-D prophylaxis, the number of deaths dropped to one by 1989. Tovey's data from the Yorkshire Regional Transfusion Centre reported the number of newborns affected by Rh disease was 267 in 1970, 103 in 1975, 84 in 1980, 52 in 1985, and 37 in 1989. The numbers of newborn deaths or stillbirths due to the disease was 66 in 1970, 14 in 1975, 7 in 1980, 2 in 1985 and 1 in 1989.

He retired in his 60s and travelled to Adelaide, Australia, where he worked at Women's and Children's Hospital for six months.

== Death ==
Tovey died on 16 November 2015. He and his wife Kay had two sons and one daughter.

== Selected publications ==
- Tovey, L. A.; Scott, J. S. (September 1980). "Suppression of early rhesus sensitization by passive anti-D immunoglobulin: suppression of early rhesus sensitization". Vox Sanguinis. 39 (3): 149–152. doi:10.1111/j.1423-0410.1980.tb01850.x. ISSN 0042-9007. PMID 6782759. S2CID 71239311.
- Tovey, L. A. (15 October 1988). "Anti-D and miscarriages". British Medical Journal (Clinical Research Ed.). 297 (6654): 977–978. doi:10.1136/bmj.297.6654.977-a. ISSN 0959-8138. PMC 1834668. PMID 2847842.
- Tovey, L. A. (June 1992). "Oliver memorial lecture. Towards the conquest of Rh haemolytic disease: Britain's contribution and the role of serendipity". Transfusion Medicine (Oxford, England). 2 (2): 99–109. doi:10.1111/j.1365-3148.1992.tb00142.x. ISSN 0958-7578. PMID 1339195. S2CID 46351120.
