= Bradford Teaching Hospitals NHS Foundation Trust =

- Former name: Bradford Teaching Hospitals NHS Trust
- Type: NHS hospital trust
- Established: 1 April 2004
- Headquarters: Duckworth Lane, Bradford, BD9 6RJ
- Budget: £600.9m
- Hospitals: Bradford Royal Infirmary; St Luke's Hospital, Bradford
- Chair: Sarah Jones
- Chief executive: Professor Mel Pickup
- Staff: 7,000+
- Website: www.bradfordhospitals.nhs.uk

Bradford Teaching Hospitals NHS Foundation Trust runs Bradford Royal Infirmary and St Luke's Hospital in Bradford, West Yorkshire, England.

== History ==
The Bradford Hospitals NHS Trust took over the management of Bradford Royal Infirmary and St Luke's Hospital from Bradford Health Authority in April 1991.

The Trust changed its name to Bradford Teaching Hospitals in April 2003 before applying to become an NHS foundation trust. It achieved this status in April 2004.

A new ultrasound suite was opened at the Bradford Royal Infirmary in December 2013 to reduce waiting time for patients needing scans. The suite took three months to complete and has increased the number of scanning rooms from two to five.

In October 2018 it announced that GE Healthcare was building a new command centre at Bradford Royal Infirmary powered by artificial intelligence which is intended to help staff make quick and informed decisions on how to best manage patient care based on streams of real-time data. Such a thing has not been established in Europe before, though there are several in North America.

== Sites ==
Besides managing Bradford Royal Infirmary and St Luke's Hospital the Trust also manages:

- Eccleshill Community Hospital
- Westbourne Green Community Hospital
- Westwood Park Community Hospital

== Performance ==
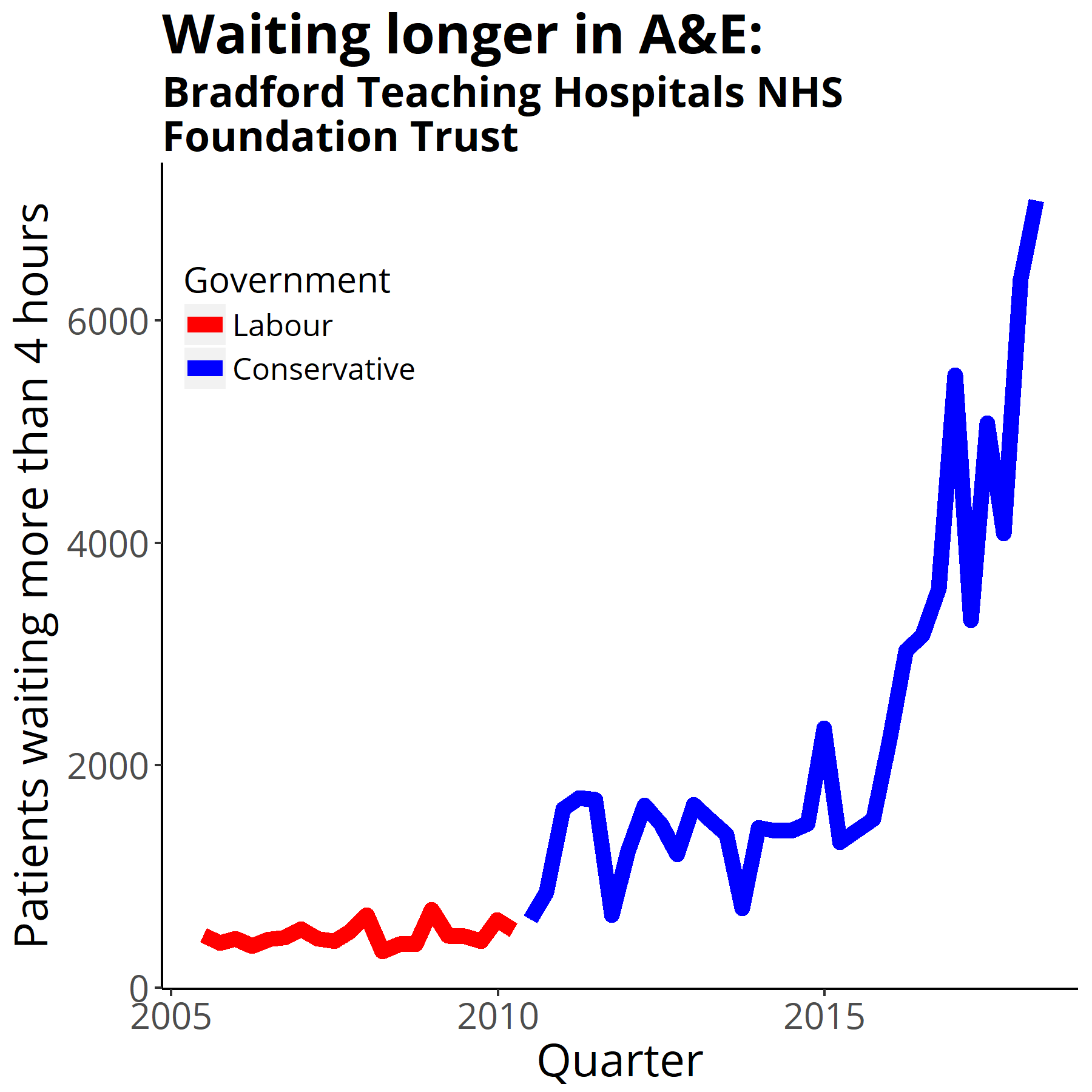
Four-hour target in the emergency department quarterly figures from NHS England Data from https://www.england.nhs.uk/statistics/statistical-work-areas/ae-waiting-times-and-activity/

In January 2014 Monitor launched an investigation into the Trust, following concerns raised by the Care Quality Commission about accident and emergency staffing levels after an unannounced inspection in September and October 2013 when they found a shortage of nursing staff and senior medical cover especially from midnight and throughout the night.

== See also ==
- List of NHS trusts
