= Listed buildings in Bradford (Little Horton Ward) =

Little Horton is a ward in the metropolitan borough of the City of Bradford, West Yorkshire, England. It contains eight listed buildings that are recorded in the National Heritage List for England. All the listed buildings are designated at Grade II, the lowest of the three grades, which is applied to "buildings of national importance and special interest". The ward is to the southwest of the centre of Bradford, and is residential. All the listed buildings are sandstone cottages dating from the first half of the 19th century.

== Buildings ==
Name and location	Photograph	Date	Notes
56, 60, 62 and 66 Quaker Lane; 53.77817°N 1.77453°W	—	c. 1800–20	Two pairs of sandstone cottages with stone slate roofs. They have one storey, the doorways have square jambs, and the windows have one light or two lights with mullions.
808–822 Little Horton Lane; 53.77687°N 1.77027°W	—	c. 1800–30	Two rows of four cottages, they are in sandstone, with block bracket eaves and stone slate roofs. There are two storeys, the doorways have square jambs, the windows are mullioned with two or three lights, and some mullions have been removed. A shop front has been inserted into No. 808.
824–830 Little Horton Lane; 53.77677°N 1.77059°W	—	c. 1800–30	A row of four sandstone cottages with stone slate roofs. There are two storeys, the doorways have square jambs, the windows are mullioned with two lights, and some mullions have been removed.
840–848 Little Horton Lane; 53.77659°N 1.77118°W		c. 1800–30	A row of four sandstone cottages with stone slate roofs stepped up a hill. They have one storey, the doorways have square jambs, and the windows are mullioned with two lights.
13–15 Farside Green; 53.77727°N 1.76957°W	—	Early 19th century	A row of three cottages in sandstone with stone slate roofs. They have one storey, each cottage has a doorway to the left with squared jambs, and the windows are mullioned, with some mullions removed.
16–24 Farside Green; 53.77724°N 1.77004°W	—	Early 19th century	A row of sandstone cottages with paired gutter brackets and stone slate roofs. They have two storeys, and are stepped in groups of three down a hill. The doorways have square jambs, and the windows are mullioned with two lights. Each cottage has a front garden with low dividing walls.
832–838 Little Horton Lane; 53.77671°N 1.77086°W	—	c. 1830–60	A row of four sandstone cottages with stone slate roofs and two storeys. Nos. 836 and 838 have mullioned windows, and doorways with square jambs and flat hoods on large shaped brackets. The other cottages have block brackets to the eaves and sash windows.
850 Little Horton Lane; 53.77652°N 1.77138°W	—	c. 1840–50	A sandstone cottage in a row, with block bracket eaves, and a stone slate roof. There are two storeys and two bays. The doorway on the left has squared jambs, above it is a single-light window, and in the right bay are two-light mullioned windows.
