= Oakwell Hospital =

Former hospital in Birstall, West Yorkshire, England

Coordinates: 53.745°N 1.650°W

Geography
- Location: Birstall, West Riding of Yorkshire, England

Organisation
- Type: Fever hospital

Services
- Beds: 90

History
- Founded: 1948

Links
- Lists: Hospitals in England

Oakwell Hospital was originally a small fever hospital built on a hilltop in Birstall in West Riding of Yorkshire, England, caring for chiefly people with diphtheria and scarlet fever. From the mid-20th century it was repurposed as a geriatric care facility until in 1962, the elderly were transferred out as a smallpox outbreak in Bradford necessitated it to be designated for the isolation of cases of smallpox.

== History ==
Oakwell Hospital was originally built as a small fever hospital located on a hilltop in Birstall in West Riding of Yorkshire, designed originally for the isolation and treatment of infectious diseases. The hospital's remote location was chosen specifically to ensure that contagious illnesses, such as diphtheria and scarlet fever, could be managed without risk of spread to nearby communities. It also included a dedicated section for smallpox patients, physically separated from the rest of the facility.

By the mid-20th century, advances in public health led to a significant decline in infectious diseases, and the hospital's wards became largely unoccupied. As a result, Oakwell Hospital was repurposed as a geriatric care facility, with The Hospital Year Book at the time listing 90 beds dedicated to elderly patients.

Since the establishment of the National Health Service in 1948, the hospital was administered by the Dewsbury, Batley and Mirfield Hospital Management Committee, under the supervision of the Leeds Regional Hospital Board.

=== 1962 smallpox outbreak ===
In early 1962, Oakwell Hospital gained national attention when it was reactivated as a quarantine and treatment center during a smallpox outbreak in Bradford, West Yorkshire. The Leeds Regional Hospital Board selected Oakwell due to its isolation, existing infectious disease infrastructure, and historical role as a fever hospital. At the time, geriatric patients were swiftly transferred to other facilities, and the hospital was quickly prepared to admit smallpox patients from Bradford.

A volunteer staff of 31 individuals, including medical, nursing, and ancillary staff, was assembled. These individuals, including a senior hospital medical officer, were required to remain confined within the hospital for weeks, to prevent the risk of transmitting the highly infectious disease. The conditions were described as demanding, with staff enduring long hours in relative isolation, and their work received high praise in Parliamentary debates.

During the outbreak, Oakwell Hospital treated a total of 18 patients, 11 of whom were confirmed smallpox cases. The hospital functioned as a self-supporting unit, with rigid security and all laundry, cleaning, and maintenance carried out internally.

It seems the source of the outbreak was a 9-year-old Pakistani girl who arrived from Karachi a month beforehand.
