= Listed buildings in Bradford (Trident Parish) =

Trident is a civil parish in the metropolitan borough of the City of Bradford, West Yorkshire, England. It contains 83 listed buildings that are recorded in the National Heritage List for England. Of these, three are listed at Grade II*, the middle of the three grades, and the others are at Grade II, the lowest grade. The parish is located to the south of the city of Bradford, and includes the areas of Little Horton and West Bowling. The parish is mainly residential, and includes some remnants of the textile industry. Most of the listed buildings are houses, cottages and associated structures, and the other listed buildings include churches and chapels, almshouses, a workhouse later converted into a hospital, and former textile mill buildings.

== Key ==
Grade	Criteria
II*	Particularly important buildings of more than special interest
II	Buildings of national importance and special interest

== Buildings ==
Name and location	Photograph	Date	Notes	Grade
3, 4–7 and 9 Little Horton Green; 53.78524°N 1.76365°W		17th century	A block of cottages in gritstone and sandstone, with quoins, block bracketed eaves, and stone slate roofs. There are two storeys and an L-shaped plan, consisting of a front range and a gabled wing on the left. The windows are mullioned, some with hood moulds.	II
18–21 Little Horton Green; 53.78493°N 1.76469°W		17th century	A group of cottages, altered in the 18th century, and at one time back to back, they are in gritstone and sandstone, with a stone slate roof and a saddlestone on the gable. There are two storeys, a front range, and a gabled wing on the right. The doorways have squared jambs, and the windows are a mix of single-light windows and mullioned windows.	II
30 Little Horton Green; 53.78498°N 1.76532°W		Mid to late 17th century	A house in gritstone, with a double-gabled front and a stone slate roof. There are saddlestones on the gables, and finials in the valleys and on the kneelers. The house has two storeys, and mullioned and transomed windows, those in the ground floor with hood moulds. The doorway has a chamfered surround and a four-centred arched lintel.	II*
33 and 36–39 Little Horton Green; 53.78504°N 1.76588°W	—	Late 17th to early 18th century	A block of cottages incorporating a barn and altered later, they are in gritstone and sandstone, with block bracketed eaves, and stone slate roofs. There are two storeys and an irregular L-shaped plan. The doorways have squared jambs, and the windows are mullioned. The barn is at the rear, and has a portal with long and short quoins.	II
149–153 Birch Lane and barn 53.77593°N 1.75090°W	—	Mid 18th century	A farmhouse, later divided, it is in sandstone, with quoins, a stone slate roof, and two storeys. The windows are mullioned, with some mullions removed. The barn has a lower roof, and contains a doorway with a chamfered surround and a large lintel.	II
41 Little Horton Green and barn 53.78511°N 1.76634°W		1755	The house and adjoining barn are in sandstone, with quoins, and a stone slate roof with coped gables and shaped kneelers. There are two storeys, a symmetrical front of three bays, and a single-storey outshut. The central doorway has squared jambs, and above it is a round-headed panel with a monogram, initials, and the date. The windows are mullioned, the window above the doorway with two lights, and the other windows with four. At the rear is a transomed stair window. To the left is the barn that contains a segmental-arched cart entry with voussoirs, a round arched-window above, and mullioned windows elsewhere.	II
43 and 44 Little Horton Green; 53.78506°N 1.76664°W	—	Late 18th century	A pair of sandstone cottages with a stone slate roof. There are two storeys, the doorways are paired in the centre and have squared jambs, and the windows are mullioned.	II
40, 42 and 44 Pullan Street; 53.78368°N 1.76421°W		Late 18th century	A row of three gritstone cottages that have stone slate roofs with saddlestones and kneelers. There are two storeys, the doorways have square jambs, some windows have single lights, and the others are mullioned.	II
Gate piers, Horton Hall site 53.78551°N 1.76009°W	—	Late 18th century	The gate piers at the entrance to the site of the former hall are in sandstone, and each pier has a plinth, shafts with chamfered rustication, and pediment capping.	II
32 Little Horton Green; 53.78508°N 1.76549°W	—	c. 1800	An outbuilding converted for residential use, it is in gritstone, with quoins and a stone slate roof. There is one storey, a doorway with square jambs, and the windows are mullioned.	II
4–10 Murray Street; 53.77648°N 1.76876°W	—	c. 1800	A row of four sandstone cottages, with block gutter brackets and a stone slate roof. There are two storeys, the doorways have squared jambs, some of the windows have single lights, and the others have two lights and mullions.	II
46–52 Pullan Street; 53.78355°N 1.76416°W	—	c. 1800–20	A row of four sandstone cottages with stone slate roofs. There are two storeys, each cottage has one bay, the doorways have squared jambs, and each cottage has a three-light mullioned window in both floors.	II
10–16 Little Horton Green; 53.78493°N 1.76431°W	—	c. 1800–30	A group of cottages, some originally back to back, forming an L-shaped plan. They are in sandstone, with paired gutter brackets, stone slate roofs, and two storeys. The doorways have squared jambs, and the windows are a mix of single-light windows, mullioned windows, and sashes.	II
49–54 Little Horton Green; 53.78479°N 1.76642°W		c. 1800–30	A block of tenements, partly back to back, they are in sandstone, with quoins, and a stone slate roof with coped gables and shaped kneelers. There are three storeys and a double-depth plan. The doorways have squared jambs and rectangular fanlights, some of the windows have single lights, and most are mullioned with three lights.	II
55 and 57 Little Horton Green; 53.78448°N 1.76602°W	—	c. 1800–40	A pair of sandstone houses at right angles with stone slate roofs. No. 55 has a single storey, and No. 57 has two. The windows in both parts are mullioned.	II
Former Sunday school 53.77706°N 1.75612°W	—	1823	The Sunday school, later used for other purposes, is in stone with a stone slate roof. There is a single storey and five bays. Above the central doorway is an inscribed datestone. At the front of the building is a wall with coved coping and central gate piers.	II
641, 643 and 645 Little Horton Lane; 53.77724°N 1.76813°W		Early 19th century	A row of three sandstone cottages, with sill bands, paired gutter brackets, and stone slate roofs. There are two storeys, and each cottage has two bays. The doorways have squared jambs, some windows have single lights, the others have two lights with mullions, and on the front is a date plaque.	II
Former Prince of Wales Public House; 53.77807°N 1.75598°W	—	Early 19th century	A house, later extended, and at one time a public house, it is in sandstone with chamfered rusticated quoins, and a stone slate roof with saddlestones and kneelers. There are two storeys, the original part has three bays, and the one-bay extension to the right is slightly lower. Steps lead up to the doorways, the windows in the original part are mullioned with three lights, and in the extension are sash windows.	II
62 and 64 Park Lane; 53.78188°N 1.76171°W	—	c. 1830	A pair of cottages in a terrace, they are in sandstone with a stone slate roof. There are two storeys, the doorways have squared jambs, and the windows are mullioned.	II
70 and 72 Park Lane; 53.78173°N 1.76195°W	—	c. 1830	A pair of cottages at the end of a terrace, they are in sandstone with a stone slate roof. There are two storeys, and each cottage has two bays. The doorways in the right bay have squared jambs, above each of them is a single-light window, and in the left bay is a two-light mullioned window in each floor.	II
2–10 Ann Place; 53.78837°N 1.75776°W	—	c. 1830–40	A terrace of sandstone houses on a plinth, with a frieze band, a moulded eaves cornice, and a slate roof. There are two storeys, and each house has two bays. The doorways have architraves and cornices on long console brackets, and the architraves of the windows continue down to the plinth. In the terrace is a segmental-arched carriage entrance with pilasters. Fronting the gardens are dwarf walls with rounded copings, and gate piers with cornices and pyramidal caps.	II
6 and 8 Edmund Street; 53.79002°N 1.75854°W	—	c. 1830–40	Originally a coach house and a cottage, they are in sandstone, with an eaves cornice and a stone slate roof. There are two storeys, and to the right is a segmental-arched coach entrance with voussoirs, and a blind octagonal panel above. The windows are sashes, and the two doorways each has an architrave, a deep frieze, and a cornice.	II
3–11 Holme Top Lane and 60 Park Lane; 53.78198°N 1.76187°W	—	c. 1830–40	A terrace of sandstone cottages with bracketed eaves and stone slate roofs. There are two storeys, and each cottage has two bays. The doorways have squared jambs, and most of the windows have two lights with mullions.	II
19–53 Holme Top Lane; 53.78234°N 1.76302°W	—	c. 1830–40	A long terrace of sandstone cottages, some stepped up a hill, with stone slate roofs. There are two storeys and each cottage has two bays. The doorways have squared jambs, and most of the windows have two lights with mullions. No. 33 projects and contains a shop window.	II
Horton Moravian Church; 53.78219°N 1.76442°W		1838	A sandstone chapel with a slate roof and a rectangular plan. The front facing the road has a crow-stepped gable and buttresses. It contains a doorway under a pointed arch, above which is a narrow window with a hood mould, and over that is a smaller slit window. Along the sides of the chapel are three lancet windows, and above them are small corbels to the eaves.	II
10, 12 and 14 Edmund Street; 53.78996°N 1.75884°W	—	c. 1840	A row of three houses at the end of a terrace, they are in sandstone, with a sill band, a deep frieze, a moulded cornice, and a blocking course. There are two storeys and each house has two bays. The windows are sashes, the windows above the doorways with an architrave. Each house has a doorway with pilasters, an egg and dart string course to the capitals, a deep frieze, a cornice and a blocking course.	II
16–28 Edmund Street; 53.79008°N 1.75941°W	—	c. 1840	A terrace of sandstone houses, with a moulded frieze, a modillioned eaves cornice, and stone slate roofs. There are two storeys, and each house has two bays. The doorways have architraves and projecting cornices on carved consoles. The middle three bays project slightly, they are flanked by chamfered quoins, and contain a segmental-arched carriageway with quoins, imposts and voussoirs, all chamfered.	II
2 and 4 Melbourne Place and coach house 53.78849°N 1.75987°W	—	c. 1840	A pair of sandstone houses on a plinth, with a shallow frieze, an eaves cornice, and a stone slate roof. There are two storeys, and each house has three bays. The central doorways have Tuscan pilasters and deep entablatures, and above each is a window with an architrave. No. 4 also has two two-storey bay windows, one rectangular and the other canted. To the left is a single-bay link to a recessed two-storey coach house. In the upper floor is an arched doorway, two windows, and a balcony with iron railings, and in the ground floor are re-set coach house doors.	II
6 and 8 Melbourne Place; 53.78860°N 1.76034°W		c. 1840	A sandstone house with quoin pilasters, a sill band, a frieze, a moulded cornice, a blocking course, and a hipped slate roof. There are two storeys and five bays, the middle three bays projecting slightly. The central doorway has Tuscan pilasters, a fanlight, and an entablature with a projecting cornice and a blocking course. The ground floor windows in the outer bays are tripartite, with Tuscan pilasters, and leaf decoration on the dividers. The other windows are sashes, and the window above the doorway is blind with an architrave.	II
Gate piers, 6 and 8 Melbourne Place; 53.78849°N 1.76042°W	—	c. 1840	The gate piers in front of the houses are in stone, panelled and tapering, and have pediment caps.	II
10 Melbourne Place; 53.78868°N 1.76075°W	—	c. 1840	A sandstone house, with a frieze, a moulded gutter eaves cornice, and a stone slate roof. There are two storeys and three bays. The central doorway has Tuscan pilasters, an entablature, and a projecting cornice. It is flanked by canted bay windows, and in the upper floor are sash windows, the middle window with an architrave.	II
Gate piers, 10 Melbourne Place; 53.78856°N 1.76070°W	—	c. 1840	There are two pairs of gate piers in front of the garden. They are in stone and tapering, and have pediment caps.	II
12 and 14 Melbourne Place; 53.78873°N 1.76103°W		c. 1840	A pair of sandstone houses on a plinth, with a moulded frieze, flat gutter eaves, and a stone slate roof with coped gables. There are two storeys, and a symmetrical front of five bays. The doorways are canted with pilasters, and each has a deep entablature, a cornice, and a blocking course stepped up to the window above. The windows are sashes.	II
49, 51 and 53 St George's Place; 53.78772°N 1.75806°W	—	c. 1840–46	A row of three houses; Nos. 49 and 53 are the earliest, with No. 51 being added in about 1846–50. They are in sandstone, with moulded eaves cornices, and stone slate roofs, hipped on the left. There are two storeys, and each house has a symmetrical front of three bays. The windows are sashes, some with aprons, and some with architraves. The doorway of No. 49 has an arched fanlight, a broken entablature, and a cornice on consoles; No. 51 has a doorway with a segmental-arched fanlight, and a cornice on fluted consoles; and the doorway of No. 53 has Doric pilasters, an entablature, and a rectangular fanlight.	II
2 and 4 Edmund Street; 53.78986°N 1.75838°W	—	c. 1840–50	A pair of sandstone houses with chamfered quoins, bracketed eaves, and a stone slate roof. There are two storeys and each house has two bays. The doorways are paired in the centre in a frame of three Doric pilasters, a deep frieze, and a cornice. The ground floor windows and those above the doorways have architraves and sills on consoles.	II
30 Edmund Street; 53.79020°N 1.75983°W	—	c. 1840–50	A sandstone house at the end of a terrace, it has quoins, a band, a moulded frieze, and a bracketed eaves cornice. There are two storeys and a front of three bays. The central doorway has a moulded cornice on ornate consoles, and the flanking windows are tripartite with pilasters and cornices.	II
8 Little Horton Green; 53.78502°N 1.76397°W	—	c. 1840–50	A detached cottage in brick, with two storeys and one bay. The windows are mullioned, with four lights in the upper floor and two in the ground floor. The doorway to the left has squared jambs, and above is a lintel carried over the doorway and the window.	II
22–25 Little Horton Green; 53.78492°N 1.76497°W	—	c. 1840–50	A row of sandstone cottages, originally back to back, with bracketed eaves, and a stone slate roof. There are two storeys, and each cottage has two bays, a doorway with squared jambs, a single-light window over the doorway, two-light mullioned windows in the other bays, and small sash windows at the rear.	II
56 Little Horton Lane; 53.78885°N 1.75876°W	—	c. 1840–50	A sandstone house on a plinth, with a sill band, a frieze, a deep cornice, and a slate roof with coped gables. There are two storeys and an attic, a symmetrical front of three bays, and a recessed bay on the right. The doorway has a porch with Doric pilasters and a deep entablature. The windows are sash windows, those in the ground floor with panelled aprons, and the middle window in the upper floor has an architrave. In the roof are two pedimented dormers, and the gable ends contain round-arched windows.	II
60 Little Horton Lane; 53.78848°N 1.75898°W		c. 1840–50	A sandstone house on a plinth, with quoin pilasters, a band, a moulded eaves cornice, a blocking course, and a slate roof. There are two storeys and a symmetrical front of three bays. The central doorway has pilasters with roundels, and a deep entablature. The windows are sash windows, the middle window in the upper floor with an architrave.	II
64 Little Horton Lane and 1 Melbourne Place; 53.78811°N 1.75939°W	—	c. 1840–50	A sandstone house on a corner site, with moulded eaves, and a hipped slate roof. There are two storeys and three symmetrical bays on each front. The central doorway on Little Horton Lane has pilasters with rosettes, an entablature, and a cornice, and the doorway on Melbourne Place has plain pilasters. The windows are sashes, those on Little Horton Lane with architraves.	II
115 Little Horton Lane; 53.78799°N 1.75851°W	—	c. 1840–50	A sandstone house on a plinth, with broad quoin pilasters, a band, a frieze, a moulded cornice, a blocking course, and a hipped slate roof. There are two storeys and three bays, the middle bay slightly projecting. Steps lead up to a central doorway with Doric columns and a full entablature. This is flanked by French windows, and in the upper floor are sash windows.	II
117 Little Horton Lane; 53.78781°N 1.75852°W	—	c. 1840–50	A sandstone house on a plinth, with a band, a shallow frieze, modillioned eaves, and a hipped slate roof. There are two storeys and three bays, the middle bay slightly recessed. Steps lead up to a central doorway with engaged Doric columns, moulded imposts, and a fanlight with a keystone on consoles. The window above the doorway has an eared architrave.	II
119 Little Horton Lane; 53.78765°N 1.75849°W		c. 1840–50	A sandstone house on a plinth, with a band, modillioned eaves, and a hipped slate roof. There are two storeys and three bays, the middle bay slightly recessed. At the top of the recess are consoles, and dentils below a frieze. Steps lead up to a central doorway that has Doric columns, an arched fanlight with spandrels in the arch, and an entablature with a pulvinated frieze. The window above the doorway has a moulded architrave.	II
123 Little Horton Lane; 53.78745°N 1.75853°W	—	c. 1840–50	A sandstone house on a plinth, with quoin pilasters, a frieze cornice a blocking course, and a hipped slate roof. There are two storeys, three bays, the middle bay projecting slightly under a pediment, and a recessed single bay to the right. The central doorway has pilasters and an entablature with a pediment. The windows are casements, those in the ground floor with cornices on consoles, and pedimented blocking courses.	II
Gate piers, 117, 119, and 123 Little Horton Lane; 53.78757°N 1.75876°W	—	c. 1840–50	The gate piers are in stone, and each has a cornice and shaped capping.	II
125 Little Horton Lane; 53.78726°N 1.75851°W	—	c. 1840–50	A sandstone house, with quoin pilasters, a deep frieze, a moulded course, a blocking course, and a hipped slate roof. There are two storeys and three bays. The central doorway has Doric columns, a large entablature, and a blocking course. This is flanked by canted bay windows, and in the upper floor are sash windows.	II
Oak Cottage; 53.78782°N 1.75757°W	—	c. 1840–50	A sandstone house with a gutter cornice and a stone slate roof. There are two storeys and a symmetrical front of three bays. The central doorway has Doric pilasters and a cornice, and the windows are sashes.	II
1–21 Sawrey Place; 53.78883°N 1.75990°W	—	c. 1845	A terrace of sandstone houses with bracketed eaves and slate roofs. There are two storeys, each house has two bays. Steps lead up to the doorways that have pilasters, and the windows are sashes.	II
Melbourne Almshouses; 53.78921°N 1.76026°W		1845	The almshouses are in sandstone with a slate roof and one storey. In the centre is a gable over an archway, and there are two smaller gables, all with saddlestones, shaped kneelers, and finials. The archway has a quoined surround, and in the gable is a crest and an inscribed and dated plaque. The outer gables contain shields. The doorways have hood moulds, and the windows are casements.	II
2–12 Sawrey Place; 53.78899°N 1.75940°W	—	c. 1845–50	A terrace of sandstone houses with bracketed eaves and slate roofs. There are two storeys, each house has two bays. The doorways have pilasters, the windows are sashes, and there is a round-headed passage entry.	II
1–39 Elizabeth Street; 53.78665°N 1.75804°W		1846	A terrace of sandstone houses with modillioned eaves and stone slate roofs. There are two storeys, and each house has two bays. The doorways have Doric pilasters, semicircular fanlights, deep friezes, bracketed cornices, and pedimental blocking courses, and the windows are sashes.	II
41–47 St George's Place; 53.78734°N 1.75806°W		c. 1846	A terrace of four sandstone houses, with quoins, shaped eaves brackets, and slate roofs. There are two storeys, No. 47, which is taller, has four bays, and the other houses have two bays each. The doorway of No. 47 has a plain surround, and the other houses have doorways with arched fanlights and keystones, broken entablatures, bracketed cornices, and consoles. The windows in all the houses are sashes.	II
1–31 Howard Street; 53.78934°N 1.75972°W		c. 1850	A terrace of sandstone houses with a bracketed eaves cornice and slate roofs. There are two storeys, and each house has two or three bays. Nos. 1–19 have single or paired doorways with architraves and cornices on consoles, and round-arched passage entries. Nos. 21 and 23 are taller with shaped eaves brackets, and round-arched doorways with architraves, rusticated surrounds, and cornices. The doorways of Nos. 25–31 have pilasters.	II
32, 34 and 36 Little Horton Lane; 53.79000°N 1.75790°W	—	c. 1850	A row of three sandstone houses with a string course, a sill band, a moulded frieze, a bracketed eaves cornice, and a slate roof. There are two storeys and basements, and each house has two bays. The doorways are in the left bay, and each has an architrave, and a semicircular fanlight with a triple keystone. The right bays contain tripartite windows; in the middle house, it is a bow window. In the upper floor are sash windows with lintels.	II
Cambridge House; 53.78778°N 1.75945°W	—	c. 1850	A sandstone house on a plinth, with quoin pilasters, bands, a deep stepped frieze, long modillion eaves brackets, and a hipped slate roof. Steps lead up to the central doorway that has Doric piers, and an entablature with a dentilled cornice. This is flanked by canted bay windows with pilasters, and in the upper floor are sash windows.	II
Conservative Club; 53.77632°N 1.75229°W		c. 1850	The building is in sandstone with rusticated quoins, a sill band, overhanging eaves, and a hipped slate roof. There are two storeys, and an entrance front of three bays. The central porch has rusticated quoins, and a doorway with a segmental arch, an architrave with a keystone, and a cornice. To its right is a canted bay window, and the other windows have architraves. The south front has two bays and contains two bay windows, one canted and the other rectangular.	II
2–14 Giles Street; 53.78606°N 1.75871°W	—	c. 1850–55	A terrace of sandstone houses stepped down a hill, with plinths, sill bands, shallow eaves and slate roofs. There are two storeys and each house has two bays. The doorways have Tuscan pilasters, rectangular fanlights, entablatures with cornices, and pedimented blocking courses, and the windows are sashes.	II
157 Little Horton Lane; 53.78610°N 1.75906°W	—	c. 1850–55	A sandstone house with rusticated quoins, a sill band, a moulded eaves cornice, and a hipped slate roof. There are two storeys, and three bays, with a single-bay extension to the right. The doorway has an architrave, a rectangular fanlight, and a dentilled cornice on decorative console brackets. The windows are sashes, the window above the doorway with an architrave.	II
3 Melbourne Place and 16 Russell Street; 53.78821°N 1.75996°W	—	c. 1850–55	A pair of houses on a corner site, they are in sandstone on a plinth, with quoins, a sill band, a frieze, modillioned eaves and a hipped slate roof. There are two storeys, and on the Russell Street front are five bays. This front contains casement windows, those in the ground floor with entablatures and architraves, and the centre window is tripartite. The south front has three bays, and contains a porch with pilasters, an entablature, and a pediment. The front on Melbourne Place also has three bays and contains a porch with pilasters and a modillioned pediment.	II
Former Friends Meeting House; 53.78830°N 1.76065°W		c. 1850–55	A pair of houses on a corner site, they are in sandstone on a plinth, with a band, a frieze, a moulded eaves cornice, and a hipped slate roof. There are two storeys, and on the Russell Street front are six bays. The doorway has pilasters, an arched fanlight, and a cornice on console brackets. To the left is a rectangular bay window, and the other windows are sashes. The front on Melbourne Place has four bays, and a similar doorway and windows.	II
54 Little Horton Lane; 53.78906°N 1.75859°W	—	c. 1850–60	A sandstone house on a plinth, with a band, modillioned eaves, and a hipped stone slate roof. There are two storeys and three bays, the left bay projecting, and to the left is a single-storey single-bay extension. The left bay of the main block contains a canted bay window, and elsewhere in the block are sash windows and a doorway, all with plain surrounds. The extension is pedimented, and contains a large Venetian window and a deep entablature. The interior of this bay is elaborately decorated.	II*
62 Little Horton Lane; 53.78837°N 1.75924°W	—	c. 1850–60	A sandstone house, later used for other purposes, it has quoin pilasters, a band, a cornice, and a blocking course. There are two storeys and a symmetrical front of three bays. The central porch has Composite columns with ornate capitals, and above it is a window with an architrave and a cornice on decorative consoles. In the outer bays are two-storey canted bay windows with decorated panels. On the left return is a cast iron trellised porch, and a round-arched window.	II
149 Little Horton Lane; 53.78649°N 1.75882°W	—	c. 1850–60	A sandstone house on a plinth, with grooved quoin pilasters, a sill course, a modillioned moulded eaves cornice, and a slate roof hipped on the right. There are two storeys and three bays. In the centre is a doorway with Tuscan columns, a semicircular fanlight with moulded imposts, a frieze, and a dentilled cornice. This is flanked by tripartite windows with architraves, friezes, and moulded cornices on console brackets. In the upper floor the central window has an architrave.	II
639 Little Horton Lane; 53.77733°N 1.76808°W	—	c. 1850–60	At one time a public house and later used for other purposes, it is in sandstone on a plinth, with an eaves cornice, and a stone slate roof. There are two storeys and a symmetrical front of three bays. The central doorway has pilasters and an entablature, and the windows are sashes.	II
1–10 Melbourne Terrace; 53.78812°N 1.75780°W	—	c. 1850–60	A terrace of ten sandstone houses stepped in pairs and three's down a hill. They have a sill band swept between the steps, a moulded eaves cornice, and slate roofs. Each house has two storeys and two bays, and a doorway with a semicircular fanlight, vermiculated voussoirs, and a keystone. The ground floor windows have two lights and a mullion, in the upper floor are sash windows, and No. 1 has a canted bay window.	II
66 and 68 Park Lane; 53.78182°N 1.76184°W	—	c. 1850–60	A pair of cottages in a terrace, they are in sandstone with bracketed eaves and a Welsh slate roof.There are two storeys, and each cottage has two bays. Both of the doorways has a cornice on consoles, a canted bay window, and sash windows.	II
68 Little Horton Lane; 53.78759°N 1.75936°W		1852	Originally a rectory, it is in Jacobethan style, and built in sandstone, on a plinth, with chamfered corners, quoins, and a slate roof that has gables with saddlestones, kneelers, and openwork finials. There are two storeys and three bays, the outer bays gabled. The central doorway has a fanlight with a four-centred arch and carving in the spandrels, and above it is a mullioned window with two four-centred arched lights. The other windows are mullioned and transomed, the upper lights with four-centred arches. Over all the windows and the doorway are hood moulds, and in the gables are carved plaques. At the rear is a later gabled hall.	II
Main Block, St Luke's Hospital; 53.78430°N 1.76150°W		1852	Built as a workhouse, it was designed by Lockwood and Mawson in Italianate style. It is in sandstone with sill bands, modillioned eaves and hipped slate roofs. There are three storeys and an H-shaped plan, consisting of a long main range and gabled cross-wings. Surmounting the centre is a belvedere with pilasters and a pyramidal roof. The windows in the middle floor have round-arched heads and linking impost bands. On the cross-wings are octagonal lanterns.	II
14–32 Howard Street; 53.78958°N 1.75961°W	—	1850s (possible)	A terrace of sandstone houses with a dentilled eaves cornice and slate roofs. There are two storeys, attics and basements, and each house has two bays. The doorways are approached by steps, they have pilasters, and two houses have more decorative surrounds. Each house has a canted bay window in the ground floor, and sash windows in the upper floor. Towards the west end is a carriageway.	II
1 and 3 Trinity Road; 53.78701°N 1.75972°W		c. 1855–60	A pair of sandstone houses in a terrace, with a band, a moulded frieze, a modillion eaves cornice and a slate roof. There are two storeys and basements, and each house has two bays. Steps lead up to doorways in the outer bays that each has pilasters, a shallow segmental fanlight, a broken entablature and a segmental pediment with paterae in the tympanum. The inner bays contain canted bay windows, and in the upper floor are sash windows.	II
Young Men's Christian Association; 53.78698°N 1.75916°W		1856–57	Originally a Baptist chapel with a minister's house behind, it is in stone with a modillioned cornice, and is in Italianate style. There are two storeys, and five bays on the front and the sides. On the front are quoin pilasters, a moulded sill course, and a modillioned pediment. The chapel is approached by steps, and the ground floor contains three round-arched doorways with keystones, and rinceaux in the soffits. In the upper floor are five round-arched windows with imposts on shell corbels. Along the sides are tall round-arched windows. The minister's house has seven bays, and contains round-arched sash windows, and a doorway with a semicircular fanlight.	II
Bowling Dyeworks Almshouses; 53.77681°N 1.74747°W		1857	The almshouses were moved to their present site and expanded in 1881. They are in sandstone, with a sill course, a small corbel table to the eaves, and a slate roof. There are two storeys, and a symmetrical plan, the outer houses projecting with gables, saddlestones and kneelers. The windows are casements, those in the end houses with hood moulds, and those in the upper floor of the other houses being gabled semi-dormers. The doorways, apart from the end houses, are paired, and have four-centred arched heads with stepped hood moulds containing carved panels. In the gables are re-set datestones.	II
St Stephen's Church; 53.77836°N 1.75796°W		1859–60	The church was designed by Mallinson and Healey, and was extended in 1886–87. It is built in sandstone and consists of a nave with gabled dormers, north and south aisles, a south porch, short north and south transepts, a chancel with a polygonal apse, and a northwest tower with gargoyles, and a helm-broach spire. Above the windows in the apse are gablets.	II
North Gatehouse, Bowling Mills; 53.78350°N 1.75567°W		c. 1860–70	The gatehouse is in stone with bracketed eaves, a stone slate roof with coped gables, and two storeys. The entrance bay projects slightly under a broken pediment with a ball finial, and it contains an archway with rusticated pilasters, above which is an oculus. On the roof is a square cupola with a pyramidal roof.	II
Shop, Bowling Mills; 53.78304°N 1.75559°W	—	c. 1860–70	The former office building is in sandstone, with sill bands and bracketed eaves. There are two storeys, seven bays on the front, and three on the left return, which has a pedimented gable. The ground floor windows have round-arched heads and are linked by an impost band.	II
B, C, D and E Blocks, St Luke's Hospital; 53.78372°N 1.76090°W		c. 1860–70	The blocks were added to the workhouse and designed by Lockwood and Mawson in Italianate style. They are in sandstone, with sill bands, impost string courses, bracketed eaves cornices, and slate roofs. The four blocks have three storeys and are set at right angles to the main building. Each block has a projecting gabled centre, and stair turrets, and the windows in the middle floor are round-headed with keystones.	II
All Saints Church; 53.78459°N 1.76320°W		1861–64	The church was designed by Mallinson and Healey, and is in Decorated style. It is built in sandstone, and consists of a nave with a clerestory, north and south aisles, north and south porches, north and south transepts, a chancel with a polygonal apse, and a southeast steeple. The steeple has a tower with four stages, inset buttresses, a trefoil panelled parapet with corner pinnacles, and a tall spire with lucarnes. In the clerestory are spherical triangle windows, in the west end is a rose window with trefoils, and the windows in the apse have crocketed gablets.	II*
Annesley Methodist Church; 53.78581°N 1.75987°W		1865–66	The Methodist church, later a Serbian Orthodox church, is in Early English style. It is built in sandstone, and consists of a nave with a clerestory, north and south aisles, a shallow chancel, and a northwest steeple. The steeple has a tower with corner buttresses, a quatrefoil panelled parapet with gargoyles, and a broach spire with lucarnes.	II
70, 72 and 74 Little Horton Lane; 53.78739°N 1.75930°W		c. 1870–80	A row of three houses in Gothic style, built in sandstone with slate roofs. There are two storeys and attics, and five bays, two of which are gabled with pierced bargeboards. On the front are three canted bay windows with hipped roofs. The other windows are sashes, some with single lights, and the others with two lights and mullions. In the attic is a gabled dormer.	II
Warehouse, Bowling Mills; 53.78267°N 1.75526°W		1880–85	The warehouse of Douglas Mill was converted for other uses in 2004–05. It is in sandstone with sill bands and modillioned eaves. There are five storeys and 24 bays, the middle three bays flanked by rusticated pilaster strips, and with a pedimented gable. At the northwest corner is a square stair tower with triple arched windows and impost string courses. The top stage contains oculi, and above is a bracketed cornice and a pyramidal roof with iron cresting.	II
St Joseph's Church; 53.78260°N 1.75867°W		1885–87	A Roman Catholic church in Gothic Revival style, it was altered in 1935–37 and extended in 1964. The church is built in stone with slate roofs, and consists of a nave and chancel with a clerestory under one roof, north and south aisles, north and south double transepts, a south porch, a lean-to west porch, and a northwest half-octagonal baptistry. Most of the windows are lancets.	II
St Oswald's Church; 53.77582°N 1.77060°W		1890–1902	The church is in sandstone, and consists of a nave, north and south aisles, a northeast porch, north and south transepts, a shallow chancel, and a northeast steeple. The steeple has a tower with shallow buttresses, an octagonal turret, and a broach spire with lucarnes. There are triple gables at the east and west ends.	II
