= Leeds Road Fever Hospital =

Hospital in Bradford, West Yorkshire, England

Coordinates: 53.794°N 1.731°W

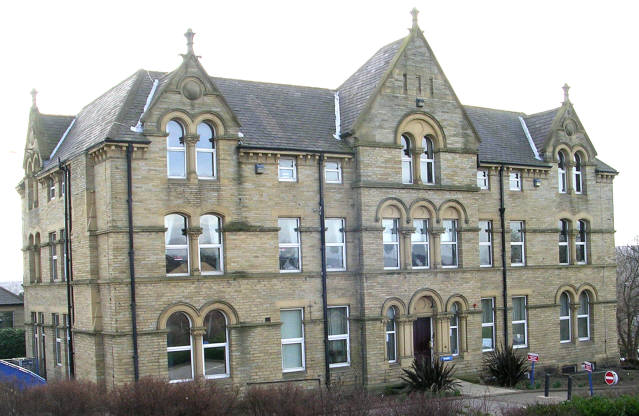
- Leeds Road Fever Hospital

Geography
- Location: England

History
- Founded: 1867
- Closed: 1972

Links
- Lists: Hospitals in England

The Leeds Road Fever Hospital in Bradford, West Yorkshire, England, was a founded in 1867. In 1962, it was one of the hospitals that were quarantined during an epidemic of smallpox in Bradford.
