= Trident, West Yorkshire =

Civil parish in Bradford, West Yorkshire, England

Coordinates: 53.779°N 1.766°W

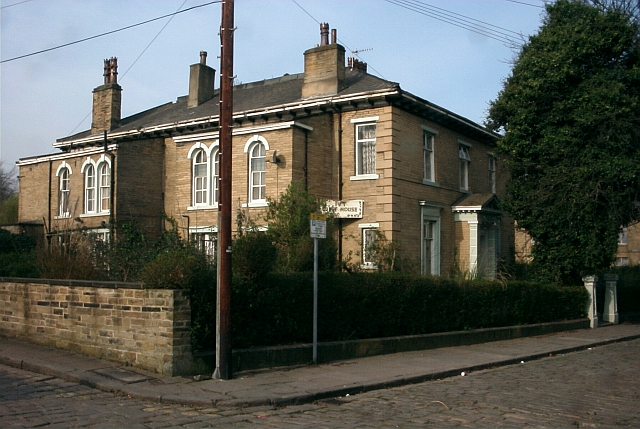
A property in Trident

Trident is a civil parish in the City of Bradford in West Yorkshire, England, created in 2009. The population of the civil parish as at the 2011 census was 20,281.

== See also ==
- Listed buildings in Bradford (Trident Parish)
