= George Whyte-Watson =

Scottish surgeon (1908–1974)

George Whyte Watson, FRCS(Ed) (1908–1974) was a surgeon, and was born on the 9 August 1908 in Lisburn Co Antrim

He graduated in medicine from Edinburgh in 1931. After an appointment as house surgeon at Edinburgh Royal Infirmary, he went to Bradford in 1932. He became a Fellow of the Royal College of Surgeons of Edinburgh in 1936 and was appointed consultant surgeon to St Luke's Hospital and Bradford Royal Infirmary in 1946. Whyte-Watson was also surgeon to Bingley Hospital and Westwood Hospital. Throughout the region he had a high reputation for his surgical skill, and was known for his kindly handling of patients.

Whyte Watson was perhaps best known for his pioneer work in collaboration with his pathologist colleague Professor Robert Lowry Turner, in the treatment of breast cancer after their researches in the use of chemotherapy, and he wrote a number of papers on the subject. Whyte Watson was instrumental in getting self-examination included as part of the procedure for detecting breast cancer.

George Whyte Watson died at his Shipley home in June 1974 and is commemorated along with Professor Robert Lowry Turner with a plaque which can be found in Bradford Cathedral.
