= Robert Lowry Turner =

British scientist

- Born: 1923
- Died: 1990 (aged 66–67)
- Medical career
- Profession: Doctor
- Field: Cancer research
- Sub-specialties: Chemotherapy

Robert Lowry Turner (1923–1990) was a British scientist known for his pioneering work in cancer research and chemotherapy. Turner came to Bradford from Belfast before being made Consultant Pathologist at Bradford Royal Infirmary in 1956.

He led a team in Bradford developing key parts of chemotherapy treatment, now a routine step for millions of people diagnosed with cancer.

Chemotherapy was made known to the rest of the medical world in 1959 after Turner, along with surgeon George Whyte-Watson, brought it into Bradford Royal Infirmary. Turner's work began on a project which looked at the effect mustard gas had on childhood Leukaemia, and developed with the help of other experts and through money raised in the city. At the time, the drugs were highly toxic, and he recognised the need for scientific input to optimise drug treatment and develop new strategies. To develop these ideas it was necessary to establish a local research base which was provided by the University of Bradford. This provided Turner with laboratory space, an office and two members of staff to help run it.

Robert Lowry Turner died in 1990. He is commemorated along with surgeon George Whyte-Watson with a plaque which can be found in Bradford Cathedral.
