= Margaret McMillan =

British educator and activist (1860–1931)

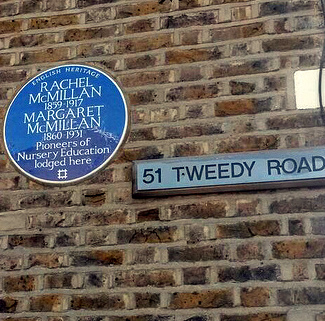
Rachel and Margaret McMillan plaque, Bromley.

Margaret McMillan CH CBE (20 July 1860 – 27 March 1931) was a nursery school pioneer and lobbied for the 1906 Provision of School Meals Act. Working in deprived districts of London, England, notably Deptford, and Bradford, she agitated for reforms to improve the health of young children, wrote several books on nursery education and pioneered a play-centred approach that has only latterly found wide acceptance.

== Biography ==
Margaret McMillan was born to James and Jean McMillan in Westchester County, New York, on 20 July 1860. Her parents were from Inverness, in the Scottish Highlands, but had emigrated to the United States in 1840. When she was four years old, an epidemic of Scarlet fever killed her father and sister and left Margaret deaf (she recovered her hearing at the age of fourteen). Thereupon Mrs. McMillan returned to Scotland with her daughters Margaret and Rachel McMillan, where both attended the Inverness High School. McMillan's mother Jean McMillan died in 1877.

McMillan went on to study Psychology and Physiology, followed by Languages and Music in Germany. In 1887, McMillan was introduced to Christian socialism and read articles by William Morris and William Thomas Stead and after July 1888 joined her sister in London. Together they attended political meetings, where they met Morris, H. M. Hyndman, Peter Kropotkin, William Stead and Ben Tillett. In 1889, McMillan and her sister helped the workers during the London Dock Strike. In 1892, they moved to Bradford. There they joined the Fabian Society, the Labour Church, the Social Democratic Federation and the Independent Labour Party (ILP).

With Bradford's school medical officer, James Kerr, McMillan carried out the first medical inspection of elementary school children in Britain. They published a report and began a campaign for local authorities to install bathrooms, improve ventilation and supply free school meals for children, after seeing the success of Bradford Cinderella Club providing a warm meal to underprivileged children.

In 1902, the sisters joined the recently formed Labour Party, working with James Keir Hardie and George Lansbury. McMillan began to write books on health and education. In 1904, she published her most important books, Education Through the Imagination and The Economic Aspects of Child Labour and Education. Through McMillan's work and joint campaigning with Katharine Glasier, the House of Commons passed the 1906 Provision of School Meals Act.

In 1908, McMillan and her sister opened England's first school clinic at Bow followed by the Deptford Clinic in 1910. A Night Camp where slum children could wash and wear clean nightclothes followed. In The Child and the State published in 1911, McMillan argued that schools should be offering a broad and humane education instead of preparing children for unskilled, monotonous jobs.

McMillan and her sister campaigned for universal suffrage. McMillan was injured while protesting the way Women's Social and Political Union members were treated in prison through the Cat and Mouse Act.

In 1914, the sisters founded the Open-Air Nursery School & Training Centre in Deptford for children from eighteen months to seven years and for adult trainees. McMillan invited personalities like Bernard Shaw and Walter de la Mare to speak to audiences in Deptford. On 25 March 1917 her sister Rachel McMillan died. McMillan continued to run the Nursery, which she named the Rachel McMillan Open Air Nursery School after her sister. Margaret McMillan's nursery in Deptford was the first to receive local education authorities (LEAs) funding in 1917.

In 1922, she was brought in touch with the work of Rudolf Steiner through Prof Millicent Mackenzie and joined the initiative Educational Union for the Realization of Spiritual Values in Education, becoming one of the organisers and presiding over the 1923 conference in Ilkley where Steiner held the lecture cycle The New Art of Education. Steiner acknowledged the work McMillan was doing, referring to her as an educational genius in his subsequent report. McMillan visited Dornach in Switzerland and saw the first Waldorf school. She remained connected with the work of Anthroposophy and assisted the growing Steiner school's movement. Later in life she became interested in the subject of nursing and established the Rachel McMillan College to train nurses and teachers in Deptford in May 1930.

McMillan died in Harrow, London in 1931.

== Legacy ==
The Rachel McMillan College, named after Margaret's sister, was founded in 1930 and merged with Goldsmiths College in the 1970s, although student accommodation still exists in Creek Road, Deptford, bearing her name.

In early May 1936, the Duke of York opened Margaret McMillan House. The first purpose-built outdoor centre created in memory of Margaret McMillan. The centre is now part of the charity, Widehorizons, which delivers a range of adventure based activities.

The Margaret McMillan College was opened in Little Horton, Bradford in 1952 and merged with Bradford College in 1975, where it continues as the McMillan School of Education.

An English Heritage blue plaque commemorates McMillan and her sister, Rachel, at 51 Tweedy Road in Bromley where they lodged.

An award-winning park named after her stands on the site of what was once one of the most deprived streets in Deptford, as shown on the poverty map published by Charles Booth.

There is a Grade II listed memorial to Margaret McMillan located within the Rachel McMillan Nursery School in Deptford.

== Published work ==
- The Life of Rachel McMillan, London: J.M. Dent and Sons (1927)
- Education Through the Imagination, BiblioBazaar (10 February 2009), ISBN 978-1103333233
- Early Childhood Education: A Series of Classic Readings. Cosmo Publications (30 November 2008), ISBN 978-8130706689
- The Nursery School, BiblioLife (10 December 2009), ISBN 978-1117660783
- Reflections on Contemporary Nursing (with Judith Townsend), Butterworth-Heinemann (17 July 1995), ISBN 978-0750689113
- Labour and Childhood, London: Swan Sonnenschein & Co., 1907, Wikidata Q107325671
- Child Labour and the Half-time System (Clarion pamphlet) (1896), "Clarion" Newspaper Co (1896), ASIN B0008BN3JG
- "The Passing of Rudolf Steiner", in Journal of Education and School World 57 (June 1925): 392–393.
- McMillan, Margaret (1907). "Woman in the Past and Future". The Case for Women's Suffrage. Wikidata Q107211889.

Party political offices
Preceded by New position	Southern Division representative on the Independent Labour Party National Administrative Council; 1906–1909	Succeeded by Robert Ensor
