= Margaret McMillan College =

Former teacher training college

Margaret McMillan College of Education
- Active: 1952–1975
- Founder: Miriam Lord
- Accreditation: University of Leeds Institute of Education; University of Bradford

Margaret McMillan College was a British teacher-training college in Bradford. It was established in 1952, and was named after the nursery school pioneer, Margaret McMillan. The founding of the college and a trust was driven by McMillan's friend and supporter Miriam Lord, who campaigned from 1945 to raise funds. The college was affiliated with the Institute of Education at the University of Leeds. It later became an associate college of the University of Bradford. In 1975 the college merged with Bradford College, and ultimately became the Margaret McMillan School of Education.
