= 1924–1925 Minnesota smallpox epidemic =

Disease outbreak in Minnesota, United States

The 1924–1925 Minnesota smallpox epidemic was the deadliest outbreak of smallpox in the U.S. state of Minnesota. 500 people died—400 of them in the Minneapolis–Saint Paul metropolitan area. Almost 90% of the Twin Cities deaths took place in Minneapolis.

The disease outbreak is thought to have started in Duluth, Minnesota during January 1924, when the first deaths of the epidemic were reported. The disease had spread to Minneapolis by the end of June. By the end of the year, 208 infected people had died in Minneapolis but there were only 12 deaths in the neighboring city of Saint Paul. At the time Minneapolis had a higher population density than Saint Paul, and it reportedly had more sickly people living in close quarters within flophouses, shelters, and boarding houses. Health workers in Saint Paul were also better trained and reportedly acted more quickly to both quarantine victims and to trace the sources of the infection. The public health officers in Minneapolis did not quarantine the victims, they placed them in public hospitals where the disease could infect new victims.

Starting in November 1924, both cities launched free vaccination campaigns. Once the deaths mounted, the frightened public jammed the vaccination centers. By mid-December 1924—according to public health officials—some 210,000 people in Saint Paul and 350,000 in Minneapolis had been vaccinated. Minneapolis recorded a few more deaths in January and February 1925, while Saint Paul recorded no deaths in the same period. The epidemic had ended by the late summer of 1925. Though occasional smallpox-related deaths were recorded in Minnesota into the early 1940s, there has been no smallpox epidemic in Minnesota since 1925.

== Background ==
Smallpox comes in two varieties, one mild and one deadly (also called black, or virulent, or hemorrhagic.) In the late 19th and early 20th centuries, the relatively mild variola minor type was common in Minnesota and killed few people. The deadly type appeared in scattered outbreaks, also killing relatively few. The worst period had been 1871–1872, when 273 people died, but since then the average had fallen to fewer than 15 deaths a year. People did not much fear it. Another outbreak took place in 1881–82, which claimed 96 lives. The average in the intervening years was 16 annual deaths from smallpox across Minnesota.

== Outbreak ==
The first 1924 deaths took place in Duluth, Minnesota, in January and were followed by more in Minneapolis in the last week of June. They raised little alarm. A few more people died over the summer. In the fall, when people began to huddle indoors, the disease spread: 27 died in October, 66 in November, and 149 in December.

At the time, about 240,000 people lived in Saint Paul and 410,000 in Minneapolis. Had the disease affected both cities' populations equally, there would have been 91 deaths in Saint Paul and 129 in Minneapolis. But at the end of 1924, 208 people had died in Minneapolis and only 12 in Saint Paul. The two cities took different tactics against the disease.

Two factors explain the difference. First, Minneapolis had a higher population density. Saint Paul and Minneapolis were about the same size in area, but Minneapolis fit 170,000 more people into an equivalent space. It had more flophouses, shelters, and boarding houses, all of which pressed sometimes sickly people into close quarters. In these conditions, the airborne smallpox virus spread quickly.

Second, Saint Paul's public health system responded more efficiently to the crisis. Its workers were better trained, and they acted more quickly to quarantine victims and trace the sources of infection. Minneapolis public health officers, perhaps overwhelmed by the scope of their problem, acted less efficiently in training hospital workers, tracing sources of the virus, and warning schools, businesses, and families of danger when infection appeared. They also put smallpox victims in the public hospital, infecting new victims. Saint Paul officials isolated as many of the ill as they could in a "pest house" far from the center of town.

Minnesota state law blocked a sound public health response. An 1883 state law had required all school-age children to be vaccinated against smallpox. But in 1903, the legislature repealed that law and made compulsory child vaccination illegal. Although smallpox vaccination is almost 100% effective, public health officers had no power to make people protect themselves. They could recommend, but not mandate, the vaccine.

Starting in November 1924, both cities launched free vaccination campaigns. Once the deaths mounted, the frightened public jammed the vaccination centers. As reported in the Minneapolis Journal, as many as 17,000 got their skin scratches in a single day. By mid-December 1924—according to public health officials—some 210,000 people in Saint Paul and 350,000 in Minneapolis had been vaccinated.

During the outbreak in the cities, Rochester had vaccinated extensively. According to Dr. D. Cameron Lochead, the city health officer at the time, 18,010 people had been vaccinated, including 10,000 by Mayo Clinic from November 2024 to January 2025. The seven deaths from smallpox in Rochester during the outbreak were attributed to lack of vaccination, or vaccinations from decades prior.

December was the worst month; 129 people died in Minneapolis alone. But by then the tide had turned. The disease had carried off the most vulnerable before mass vaccination took effect. 88 people died in January 1925 and 30 in February (all in Minneapolis). By late summer, the epidemic had passed.

== Toll ==
In the final toll, Saint Paul reported 855 smallpox cases and 38 deaths, suggesting a 4.4% death rate. Minneapolis reported many more cases, 1,430 cases and 365 deaths, indicating a death rate almost six times as high (25.5%). Another 101 people died around the state. Though occasional deaths took place into the early 1940s, smallpox as an epidemic never returned to Minnesota. Other statewide reports note that 4,041 people had smallpox and 504 died throughout Minnesota.
