= Bradford Children's Hospital =

Hospital in Bradford, West Yorkshire, England

Coordinates: 53.808°N 1.771°W

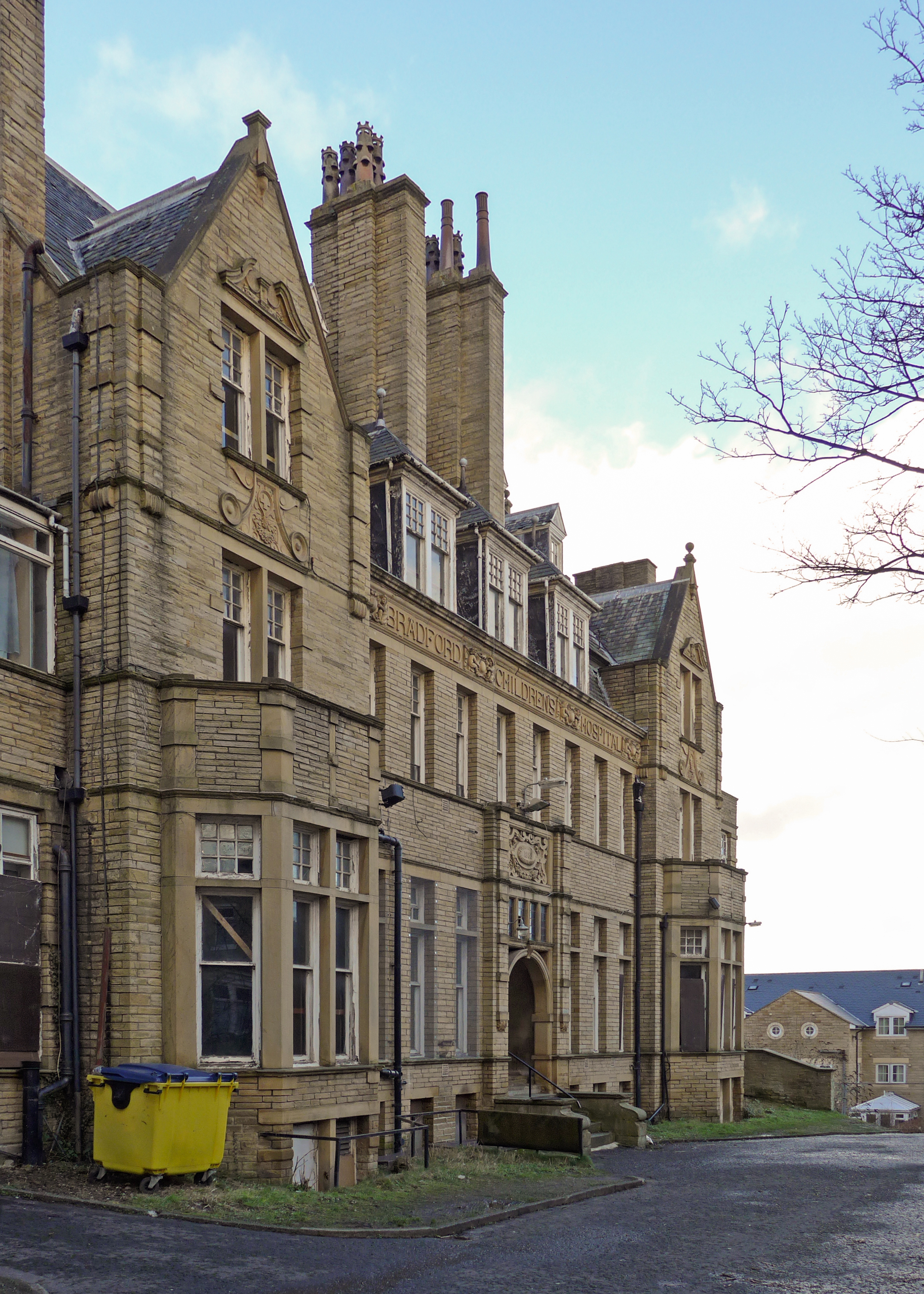
- Bradford Children's Hospital

Geography
- Location: Bradford, England

History
- Founded: 2009
- Closed: 2015

Links
- Lists: Hospitals in England

Bradford Children's Hospital in Bradford, West Yorkshire, England, was founded in 1883 and closed in 1988. Its foundation stone was laid by Samuel Cunliffe Lister in 1889. Richard Smithells was once a paediatrician at the hospital. After it closed as a children's hospital the building became Nightingale's Nursing Home which closed in 2006. Subsequently it was converted into the Anjuman-e-Haideria Mosque. It is a grade II listed building.
