= Bradford Royal Infirmary =

NHS hospital in Yorkshire, England

- Bradford Teaching Hospitals NHS Foundation Trust
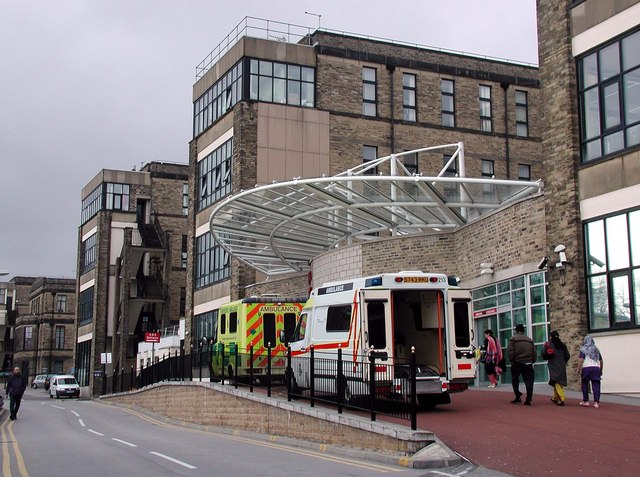
- Bradford Royal Infirmary

- Location in West Yorkshire

Geography
- Location: Bradford BD9 6DA, West Yorkshire, England
- Coordinates: 53°48′21″N 1°47′40″W

Organisation
- Care system: NHS
- Affiliated university: Leeds School of Medicine

Services
- Emergency department: Yes - Trauma Unit

History
- Founded: 1936

Links
- Website: www.bradfordhospitals.nhs.uk
- Lists: Hospitals in England

Bradford Royal Infirmary is a large teaching hospital in Bradford, West Yorkshire, England, and is operated by the Bradford Teaching Hospitals NHS Foundation Trust. The infirmary is affiliated with the Leeds School of Medicine.

== History ==
The hospital has its origins in the Bradford Public Dispensary founded in 1825. It opened at Darley Street in 1827 and moved to Westgate as the Bradford Infirmary in 1843. In December 1882 the infirmary staff responded to the Newlands Mill chimney collapse which resulted in the loss of 54 lives, mostly young girls and boys. The facility became the Bradford Royal Infirmary in 1897 in commemoration of Queen Victoria’s Diamond Jubilee

The foundation stone for the current facility in Duckworth Lane was laid by the Duke and Duchess of York in 1928 and the facility opened in 1936. It joined the National Health Service in 1948. The hospital was noted for being a pioneer in the field of chemotherapy under Professor Robert Turner and George Whyte-Watson in the 1950s.

== Services ==
Specialist services include support from the Yorkshire Cochlear Implant Service for young children and adults that have a Cochlear implants.

The hospital hosts the 'Centre for Ageing' a research group focused on applied health research on older people and funded by the Wolfson Foundation.

== See also ==
- List of hospitals in England
