= St Luke's Hospital, Bradford =

- Bradford Teaching Hospitals NHS Foundation Trust
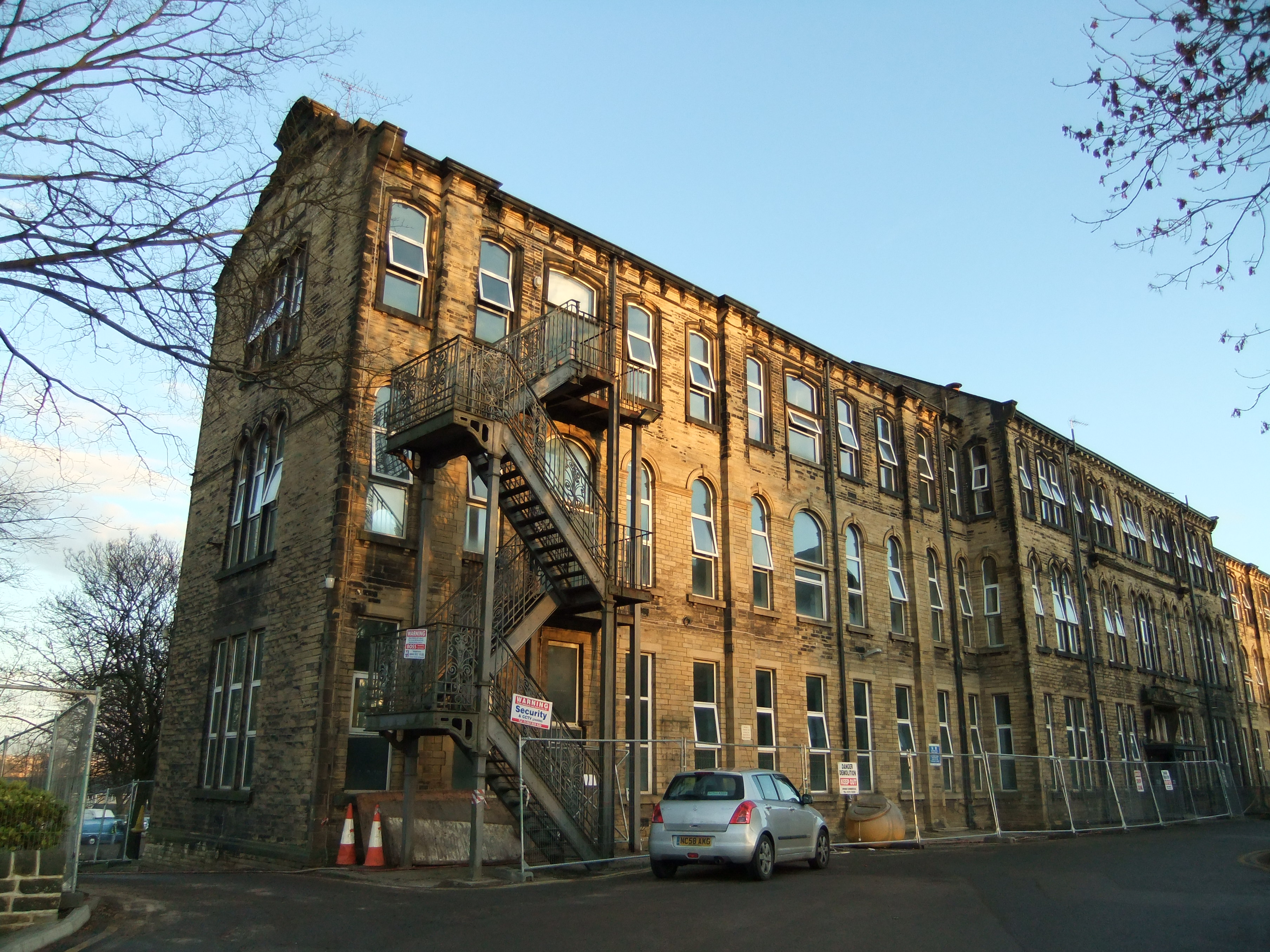
- St. Luke's Hospital, Bradford

- Shown in West Yorkshire

Geography
- Location: Bradford, West Yorkshire, England
- Coordinates: 53.784100°N 1.760800°W

Services
- Emergency department: No

History
- Founded: 1852

Links
- Website: www.bradfordhospitals.nhs.uk
- Lists: Hospitals in England

St Luke's Hospital is an NHS hospital in Bradford, West Yorkshire, England. It is situated on Little Horton Lane to the south-west of Bradford city centre. The hospital is managed by Bradford Teaching Hospitals NHS Foundation Trust. The main accommodation block is a grade II listed building.

== History ==
The hospital has its origins in the Bradford Union Workhouse Infirmary which was completed in 1852. During the First World War, the Bradford Board of Guardians ran the hospital as an auxiliary war hospital. Thereafter it became known as St Luke's Hospital. It became the City of Bradford Municipal General Hospital in 1929 and joined the National Health Service as St. Luke's Hospital in 1948.

The hospital was noted for being a pioneer in the field of chemotherapy under Professor Robert Turner and George Whyte-Watson in the 1950s.

In 2009 a disused ward on the site was used as the fictional St Aidan's Hospital in the ITV drama, The Royal with external scenes filmed around Scarborough and Whitby in North Yorkshire. One of the stars of the Royal, Natalie Anderson, was actually born at St Luke's in 1981 when the hospital had a maternity ward. This and other buildings were not being used for medical practice and in 2010, were demolished due to vandalism, dry rot and asbestos.

It was also used as a filming location in A Passionate Woman in autumn 2009.

== Hospital radio ==
St Luke's Sound is the hospital radio station serving patients and staff.

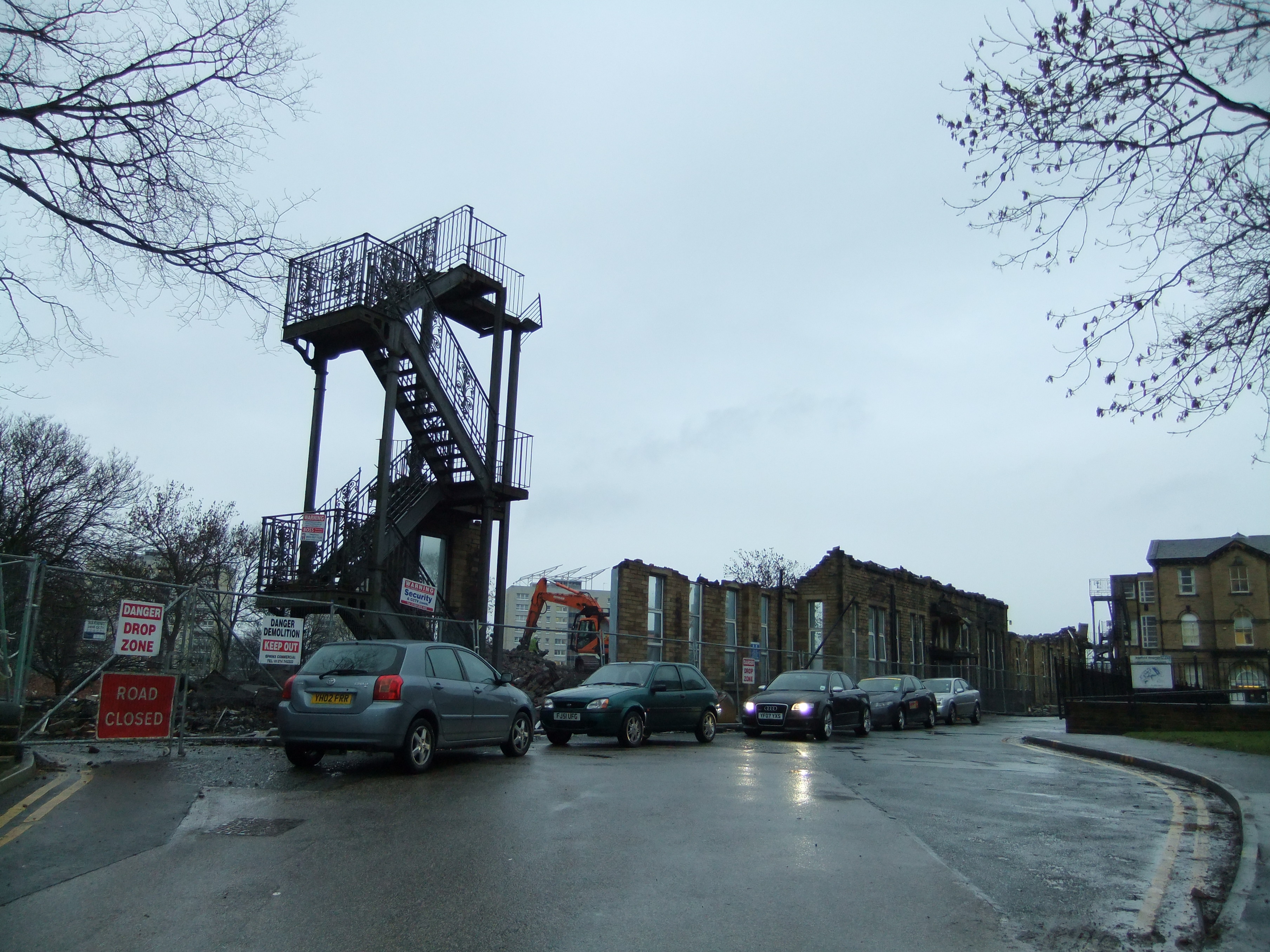
St Luke's Hospital, Bradford, after partial demolition of one building

== See also ==
- List of hospitals in England
- Listed buildings in Bradford (Trident Parish)
