= Great Northern Railway Trail =

Footpath in England

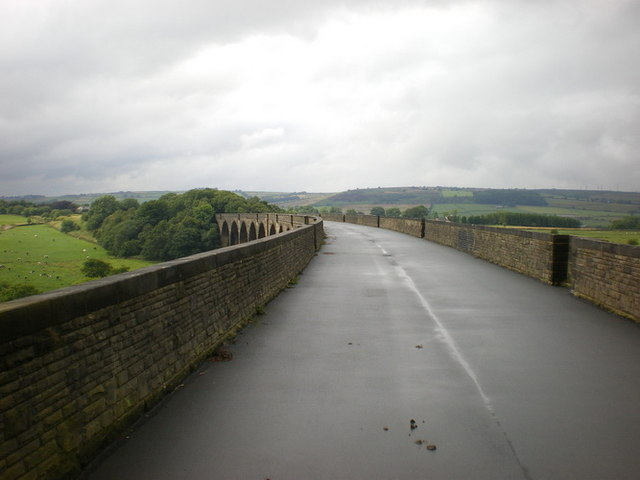
- Hewenden Viaduct looking north – the deck has been tarmacked for The Great Northern Railway Trail
- Length: 6.2 miles (10 km)
- Established: 2005
- Designation: UK National Cycle Route 69
- Trailheads: Cullingworth; Queensbury
- Use: Cycling, pedestrians, horse trail
- Surface: Tarmacked (on designated sections)

The Great Northern Railway Trail is a cycleway and footpath in the Bradford District of West Yorkshire, England, disconnected into two sections. The path follows the route of a former railway, that of the Great Northern railway line between Bradford and Keighley that went via Queensbury and Cullingworth. The path has been designated as part of the National Cycle Route number 69.

== History ==
The Great Northern Railway (GNR) opened up its lines connecting Bradford, Halifax and Keighley between 1878 and 1884. This involved a triangular junction at Queensbury railway station. As the GNR lines were built after other railways had been constructed in the valleys, many of their lines were built to traverse the high valley sides and as such, had many steep gradients and tunnels which led to them acquiring the nickname of The Alpine Lines.

Passenger traffic on these lines had ceased by 1955, with complete closure of the lines by 1972 and much of the trackbed was abandoned and the tunnels bricked up. In 2005, Sustrans and Bradford Council re-opened a section of the former track from the site of Cullingworth railway station to the former station of Wilsden as the Great Northern Railway Trail. In 2008, a smaller section through Thornton village and across the viaduct there was opened, along with a second stretch between the former Queensbury railway station and a point just south of Thornton Viaduct. The final stretch to connect the two sections from Thornton Viaduct to the former station site at Queensbury opened in October 2012.

Eventually the trail will cover 6.2 miles (10 km), but currently this is split into two sections some 2 miles (3.5 km) apart. Although the whole trail is seen as one through route, only the sections between Cullingworth and Hewenden Viaduct, and Queensbury station and the northern edge of Thornton Viaduct are designated clear of road traffic. The section between these two is accomplished on footpaths for walkers, but cycle traffic must take to local roads to connect between the two sections.

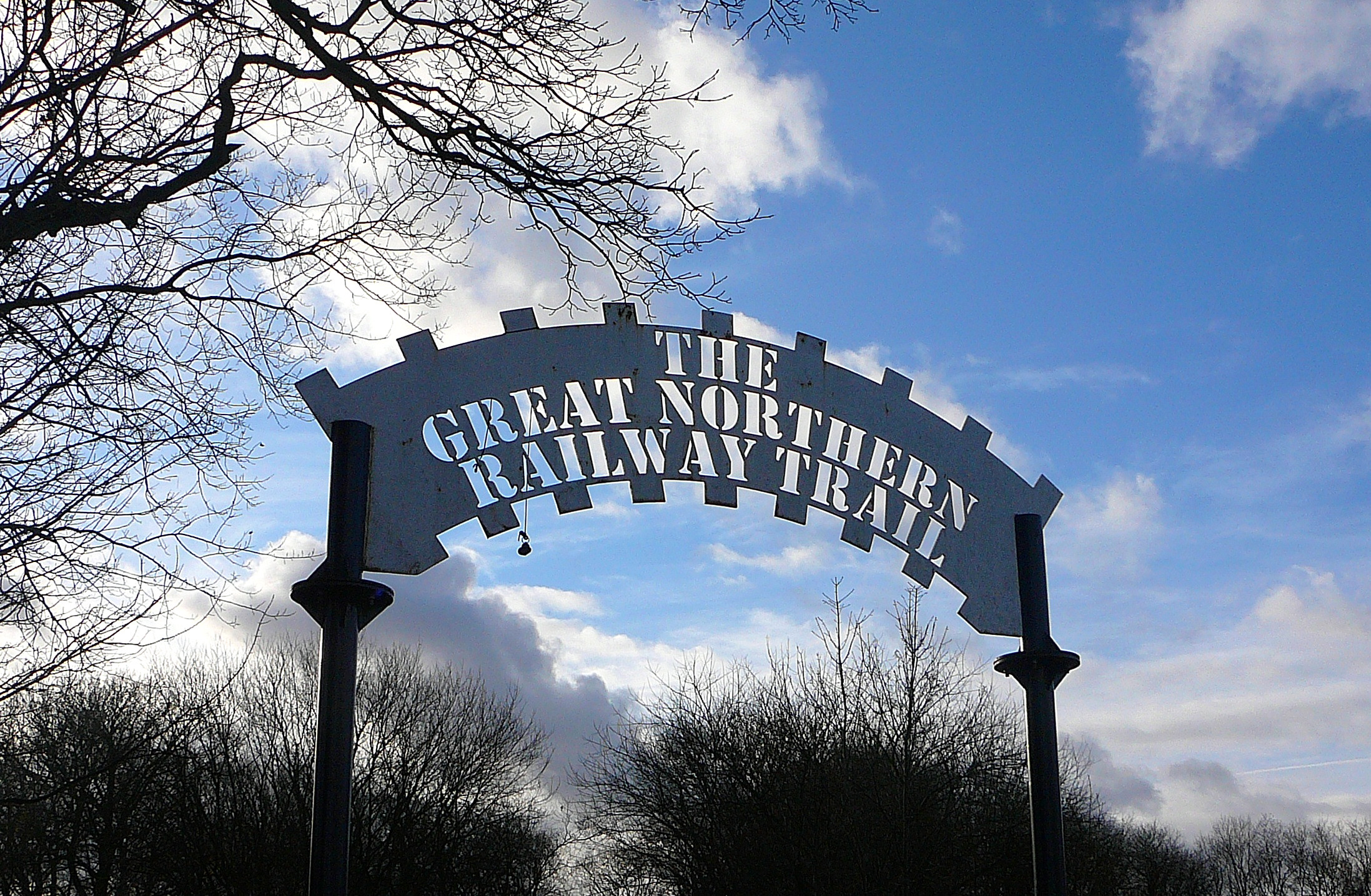
Sign at the start of the trail in Cullingworth

Since the initial re-opening in 2005, smaller sections have opened in a piecemeal fashion which add to either end of the two split sections. The route connects with two other long distance paths; the Calder/Aire Bridleway in Cullingworth and the Bronte Way at Thornton.

== Infrastructure ==
There are three viaducts on the route; Cullingworth, Hewenden and Thornton. Both Hewenden and Thornton viaducts are grade II listed structures and Thornton is particularly noted for its S-shaped curvature and its views over the Pinch Beck valley. A platform has been installed at Hewenden to allow for a greater views across the viaduct and westwards across Hewenden reservoir.

The missing section between the south end of Hewenden Viaduct and the north end of Thornton viaduct includes five disused tunnels; Well Head (662 yards (605 m)), Hamer's Hill (153 yards (140 m)), Doe Park No 1 (140 yards (130 m)), Doe Park No 2 (33 yards (30 m)) and Doe Park No 3 (112 yards (102 m)).

== Future ==
Sustrans, Bradford Council and local campaigners are all lobbying to get the route opened fully between Bradford and Keighley, with an extension through the 2,501-yard (2,287 m) long Queensbury tunnel towards Halifax. A Sustrans report into re-opening the route (and Queensbury Tunnel) revealed that the best case scenario would cost £11.6 million over 30 years, but this would yield £37.6 million in economic, health and tourism benefits over the same time period.

Because of damage inside Queensbury tunnel and the lack of maintenance, the current owners of the tunnel (National Highways Historical Railways Estate) have suggested that the tunnel be sealed off with concrete which would cost £3 million. Campaigners state that it would be more beneficial for the community to convert the tunnel into the longest underground cycleway in Europe. The southern portal of the tunnel is in a deep cutting and is prone to flooding (as deep as 40 feet (12 m) of water at times) and so would need remediation to make it safe again.

An extension south westwards from Queensbury is planned (with or without the tunnel) to Holmfield in Halifax.
