= North Bridge, Halifax =

North Bridge
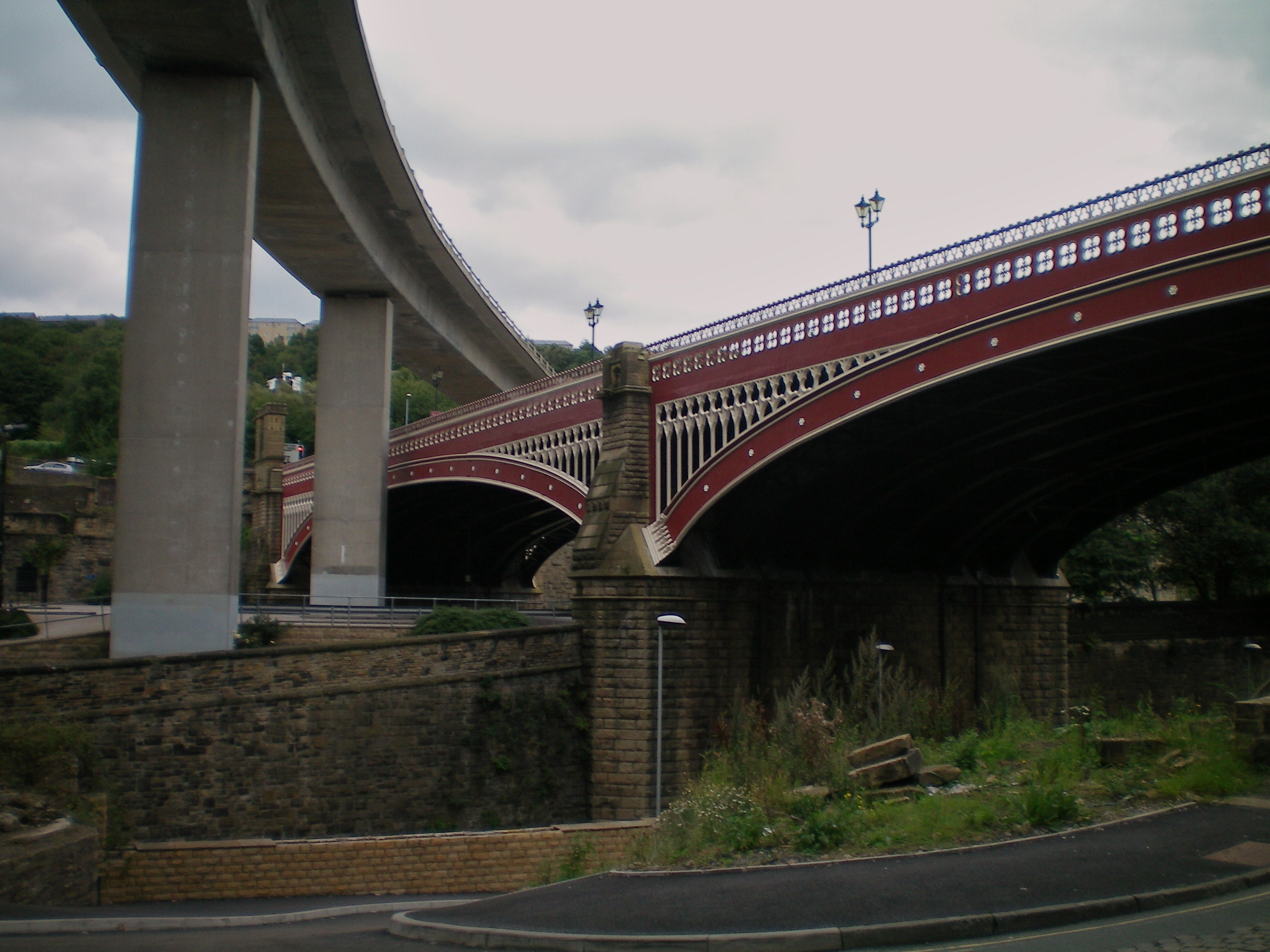
- The modern bypass curves over North Bridge
- Coordinates: 53°43′37″N 1°51′32″W
- Carries: Motor vehicles Pedestrians
- Crosses: River Hebble
- Locale: Halifax, West Yorkshire, England

Characteristics
- Design: Arch Bridge

History
- Opened: 1871

North Bridge is a Victorian iron and stone bridge at Halifax, West Yorkshire, in northern England. It crosses the valley of the River Hebble, connecting the town to roads to Bradford and Leeds. Replacing an earlier six arch stone bridge, it was raised to allow the subsequent construction of the Halifax and Ovenden Joint Railway beneath it, including North Bridge railway station. Opened in 1871 amid chaotic crowd scenes it carried increasingly heavy traffic until it was by-passed by the Burdock Way in 1973. It remains in use for local traffic. On the south end of the structure was a theatre, adjoining the bridge, called the Grand Theatre.

== Earlier bridges ==
The earliest record of a wooden bridge over the River Hebble is in 1277. A stone bridge recorded in 1719 collapsed on Rogation Day in April 1770 during a beating the bounds ceremony causing many injuries. Matthew Oates of Northowram began work on a new bridge in 1772, using stone from quarries in Crib Lane. This 400 feet (120 m) long six-arch bridge, 28.5 feet (8.7 m) wide and 56 feet (17 m) above the river, which carried the turnpike road was opened in 1774. There was a toll-booth at the north end. Iron palisades were fitted after a Mr Asquith of Hipperholme was pushed from the bridge and killed by an unknown attacker in 1819. Part of this bridge collapsed because of flash flooding on 23 July 1855. It was demolished in 1870 to make way for the new bridge.

== Design and construction ==
North Bridge was designed in Victorian Gothic style by brothers John and James Fraser of Leeds. John had considerable experience of railway bridge design. Two 160 feet (49 m) spans of semi-elliptical arch ribs are supported by stone piers with ecclesiastical style buttresses, carrying a 60 feet (18 m) wide roadway. There are lancets in the spandrels. The parapets are richly decorated with quatre-foil piercings with central Maltese crosses and tri-foil pattern railings above with a crenellated top rail. The mainly cast iron parapet ribs have a wrought iron central section of 56 feet (17 m). The central pier stands 75 feet (23 m) high and the bridge was built 11 feet (3.4 m) higher than its predecessor so that the Halifax and Ovenden Joint Railway could pass underneath the northern end. North Bridge Station was just east of the bridge, extending under it. A drinking fountain, named for James Oates who worked on the bridge, is set into the south west turret of the bridge. The cost of the bridge was £21,000 or 17 shillings and six pence per square foot of roadway, claimed to be the cheapest bridge in England at the time.

== Opening ceremony ==
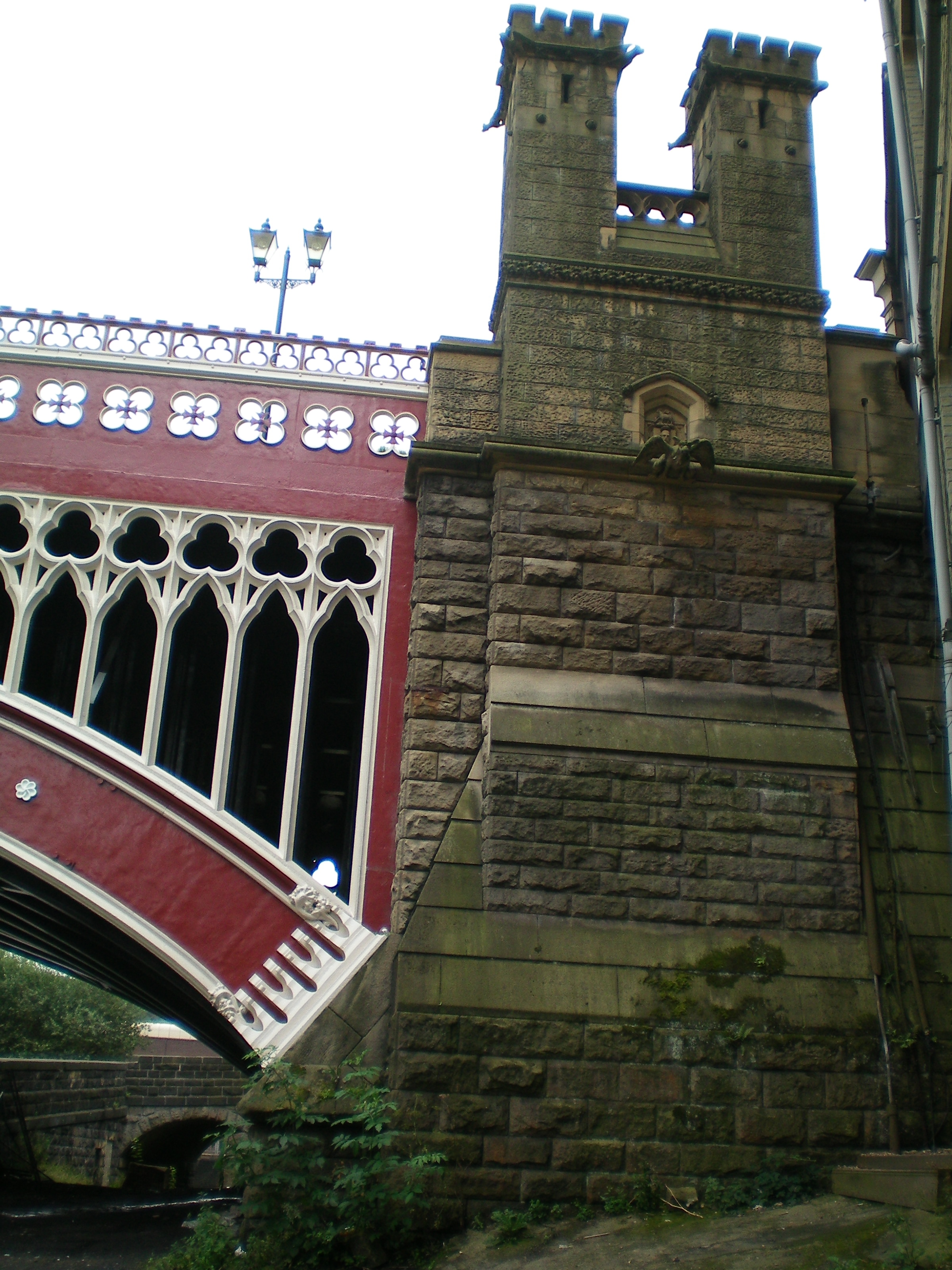
The southern bridge pier

The bridge was opened on 25 October 1871 amid scenes of confusion as local people, given a half-day holiday, swarmed over the bridge well in advance of the official opening by the mayor. The mayor and corporation and the borough's MP, together with the Halifax Artillery and Rifle Volunteers and a detachment of the 2nd West Yorkshire Yeomanry, formed a procession at the town hall at about 3 pm. The police had cleared some space at the southern end of the bridge, but by the time an advance party of yeomanry reached the bridge the crowds had reoccupied it. Twenty dragoons were drawn up across the southern entrance of the bridge to hold the crowds back. A ceremony was then held which included the town's MP Sir James Stansfeld, Lord Frederick Cavendish, Colonel Akroyd, the mayors of Bradford, Leeds and Wakefield, the Master Cutler of Sheffield, the Town Clerk of Leeds and the bridge engineers. This concluded with an artillery salute.

== Trams ==
Starting in 1898 tram lines began to be extended from Halifax along the Calder Valley including lines running over the bridge. The steep terrain of the area was not ideal for trams and there were several fatal accidents. In 1906, an eight-ton double decker tram ran out of control down New Bank, Halifax, and overturned on North Bridge, killing two people and injuring 11 others.

== Modern times ==
A weight restriction of seven tons was applied to the bridge in 1968, until strengthening work had been completed. Since Burdock Way, the modern flyover system, was opened in 1973 to take the A58 and A629 traffic over the River Hebble North Bridge remains in use for local traffic.
