= Lees Moor Tunnel =

Disused railway tunnel in West Yorkshire, England

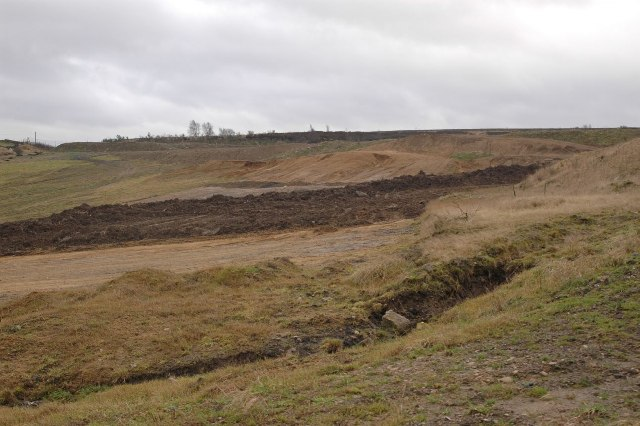
- Landfill site on top of the south end of the former Great Northern Railway's Lees Moor Tunnel, in 2006
- Interactive map of Lees Moor Tunnel

Overview
- Line: Queensbury Lines
- Location: Cullingworth, West Yorkshire, England
- Coordinates: 53°50′11.9″N 1°55′32″W

Operation
- Opened: 1884
- Closed: 1963

Technical
- Length: 1,533 yards (1,402 m)
- No. of tracks: Double track
- Track gauge: 4 ft 8 1/2 in (1,435 mm) standard gauge
- Lees Moor Tunnel (West Yorkshire)

Lees Moor Tunnel is an abandoned tunnel on the former Great Northern Railway line between Queensbury and Keighley in West Yorkshire, England. The former dual track tunnel is just north of the village of Cullingworth in West Yorkshire and when built was 1,533 yards (1,402 m) long. Due to the pitch black inside and the squealing of the wheels on the curve, drivers nicknamed it the 'Hell Hole'. After closure to passengers, the tunnel was used in experiments involving the effects of smoke inhalation and cancer.

== History ==
The line was promoted under the Halifax, Thornton & Keighley Act from 1873. Despite protestations from the Midland and the Lancashire and Yorkshire Railways (and with the Midland trying an alternative bill) the Great Northern venture was successful and the line opened to goods traffic on 1 April 1884, with full opening to Keighley on 11 November 1884.

The tunnel took almost six years to cut and line with masonry, with work starting in 1878 at Cullingworth and full opening in 1884. The ground through which the tunnel was bored was almost solid rock and had a decline of 1 in 78 towards Keighley. A train leaving Cullingworth going to Keighley actually entered the tunnel heading west and when leaving the tunnel at its northern portal it was heading north-east.

The tunnel was built without ventilation shafts and so became hazardous for crews on slower trains. Due to greasy rails on the line going up from Ingrow East railway station, a train could take almost ten minutes to clear Lees Moor Tunnel. Even experienced crews told how they used to lie flat on the cab of the steam engine to try and get more air to breathe.

In 1887, it was suggested that the northern portal would be useful as the position of a junction for a new railway over the moors to Colne. The projected railway would head westwards past Cross Roads and would use overbridges and viaducts to cross the Worth Valley Railway at a 90-degree angle before going on through Stanbury and Trawden and down into Colne. The Great Northern were favoured for this project as their railway climbed so high out of the Worth Valley as opposed to the Midland line which stayed on the valley floor.

A decapitated and horribly mutilated man's body was found in the tunnel near to the Cross Roads portal in March 1891 by a platelayer. It was estimated that his age was around 37 and that a train had caused his injuries rather than by other means as his body was still warm.

On 24 April 1942, a 50 year old platelayer was killed by a train as it exited the northern portal. Thomas B Lambert was with two other men on a maintenance schedule when the accident occurred.

== Closure ==
The entire line from Queensbury to Keighley was closed to passengers in May 1955 with closure to goods traffic in May 1956. After closure, the tunnel at Lees Moor was used by British Rail and staff from St Bartholomew's Hospital in London to test for smoke emissions from both diesel and steam locomotives. The tests were in relation to cancer and the inside of the tunnel and the lack of ventilation shafts helped to keep the smoke lingering for advanced measuring. Two BR Class 20 diesel locomotives and an A3 Pacific, 60081 'Shotover' were provided for the testing.

The lines around Cullingworth, including those through Lees Moor Tunnel, were also used for brake testing on Diesel Multiple Units that were then being deployed by British Rail. This led to speculation that the line was to be re-opened, which was unfounded. The tracks were finally removed in 1963.

After closure, the eastern portal was bricked up and the northern portal was gated so that the tunnel could be used for caravan and motorhome storage. The roof of the tunnel had to be lined with polythene sheeting as no ventilation shafts were present in the construction resulting in a heavy moisture atmosphere.

== Location ==
- Northern portal: 53°50′26.9″N 1°55′37.0″W
- Eastern portal: 53°50′00.3″N 1°54′50.6″W
