= St. Paul's railway station (Halifax) =

Disused railway station in West Yorkshire, England

St. Paul's
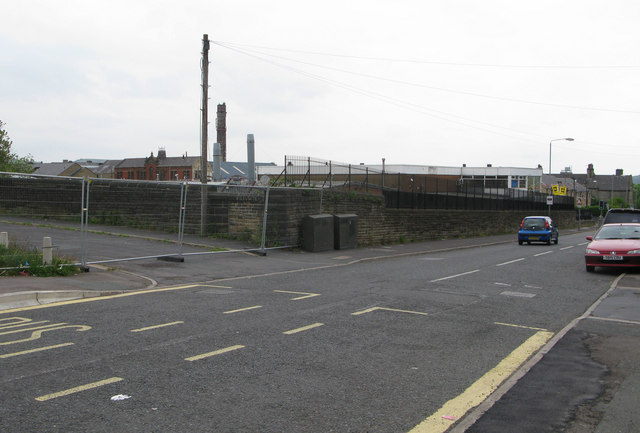
- Site of the former station in 2010

General information
- Location: Halifax, Calderdale; England
- Coordinates: 53.71829°N 1.88169°W
- Grid reference: SE079246

Other information
- Status: Disused

History
- Original company: Halifax High Level Railway
- Pre-grouping: Lancashire & Yorkshire Railway and Great Northern Railway
- Post-grouping: London, Midland and Scottish Railway and London and North Eastern Railway

Key dates
- 5 September 1890: Opened
- 1 January 1917: Closed to passengers
- 27 June 1960: Closed completely
Location

St. Paul's railway station, also known as Halifax St. Paul's, served the St. Paul's area of Halifax, West Yorkshire, England on the Halifax High Level Railway.

== History ==
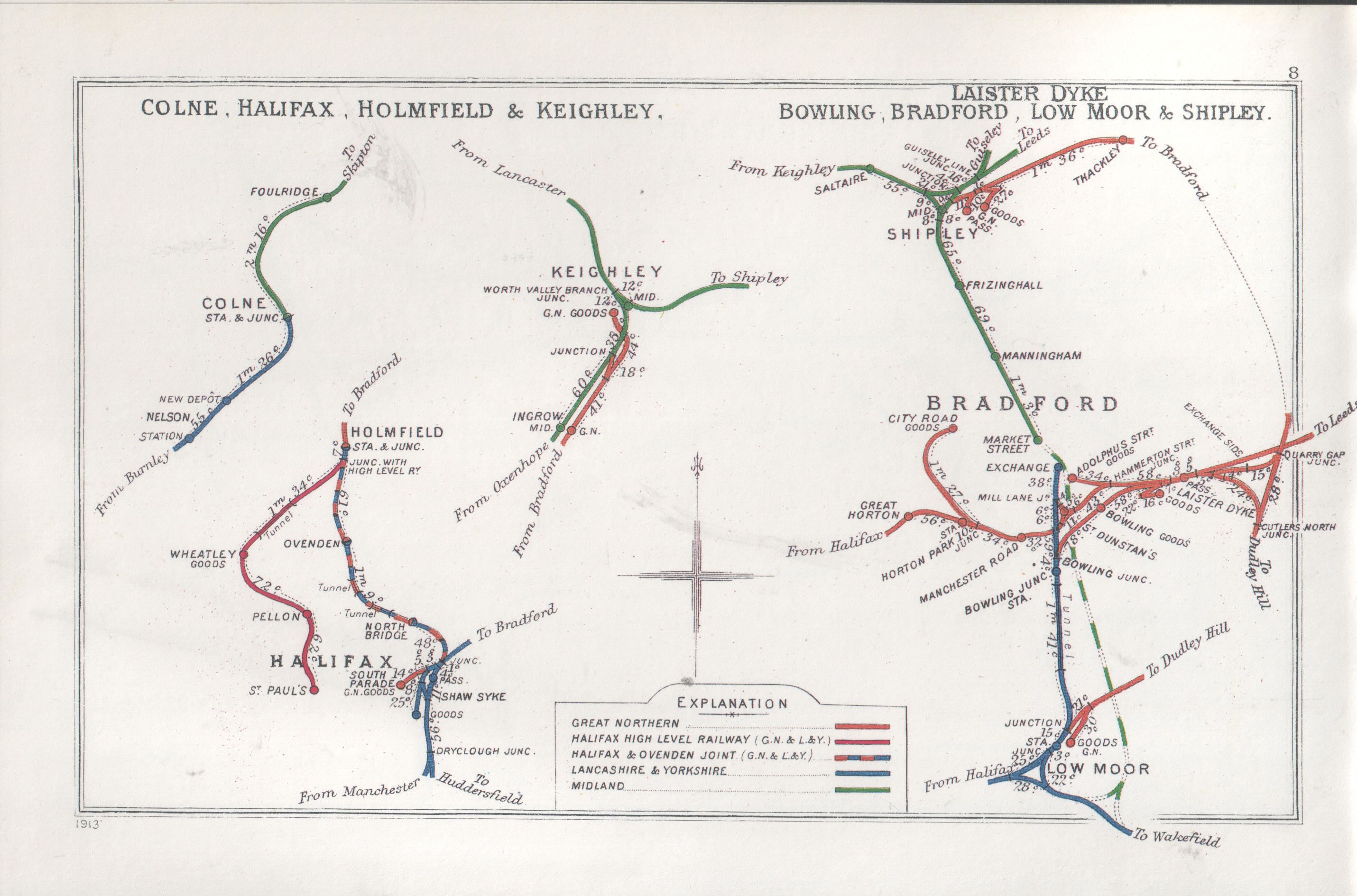
A 1913 Railway Clearing House Junction Diagram showing (lower left) the Halifax High Level Railway (red) including St. Paul's station

It was one of two stations on the short lived Halifax High Level Railway, which was built to serve the west side of Halifax. The station opened on 5 September 1890. The line had been originally been proposed to go straight through to Huddersfield however the plan was abandoned in 1887. The line did not have many passengers as those who wanted to travel to Huddersfield had a 5-mile (8 km) and an extra journey time of 30 minutes to get there. The branch and its two stations closed to passengers on 1 January 1917 as a wartime economy measure. The branch closed to goods on 27 June 1960 along with the line from Holmfield to North Bridge.

== Route ==
Preceding station	Disused railways	Following station
Terminus	L&YR and GN; Halifax High Level Railway	Pellon
