= Woodside Viaduct =

Former railway viaduct in West Yorkshire, England

Coordinates: 53.7304°N 1.8691°W

Woodside Viaduct was a railway bridge in Halifax, West Yorkshire, England. It had six arches and was situated between Woodside (Old Lane) Tunnel and Lee Bank Tunnel. The bridge carried the Queensbury to Halifax section of the Queensbury lines.

The viaduct was demolished to make room for the dual carriageway on the A629 road, the main road between Halifax and Keighley.
