= Wheatley Viaduct =

Railway viaduct in West Yorkshire, England

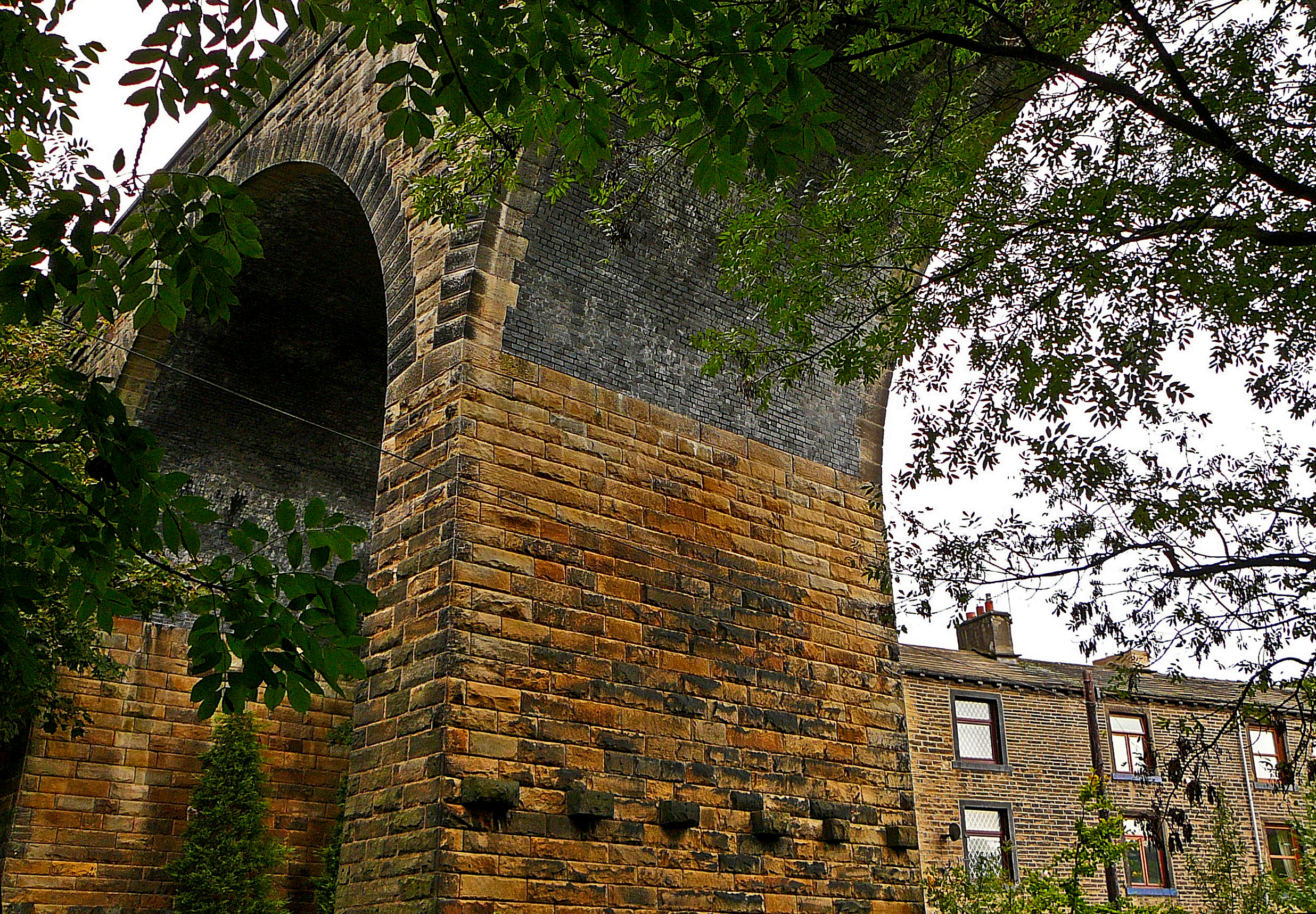
- Wheatley Viaduct showing brick layout
- Coordinates: 53.739°N 1.898°W
- OS grid reference: SE068270
- Crosses: Hebble Brook
- Locale: Wheatley, Halifax, West Yorkshire, England

Characteristics
- Total length: 200 yards (180 m)
- Height: 100 feet (30 m)
- No. of spans: 10

Rail characteristics
- No. of tracks: 2
- Track gauge: 4 ft 8 1/2 in (1,435 mm) standard gauge

History
- Opened: 1 August 1890
- Closed: 27 June 1960

Location
- Interactive map of Wheatley Viaduct

Wheatley Viaduct is a former railway bridge straddling the Hebble Brook on the northern side of Halifax, in West Yorkshire, England. The ten-arch viaduct was built as part of the Halifax High Level Railway that connected with the Queensbury lines complex of the Great Northern Railway between Halifax, Keighley and Bradford. The line was opened in 1890, and closed to all traffic in 1960.

== History ==
The Queensbury lines were opened to traffic in the late 1870s, and the Halifax High Level Railway was opened in 1890. Originally the intent had been for the line to be extended through Halifax to connect with a proposed Hull and Barnsley Railway station in the centre of Halifax, and as such, the trackbed was built to accommodate two lines. The line had two major engineering features, the viaduct, and nearby 810 yards (740 m) Wheatley Tunnel, with the cost of the 3-mile (4.8 km) branch coming in at £300,000 (equivalent to £33,330,000 in 2025). Mapping from 1905 shows the entire branch had double track, but by the late 1940s when it was a freight only branch, just one line was in use across Wheatley Viaduct and through the adjacent tunnel.

The viaduct has ten arches, each 50 feet (15 m) wide, and stretches for 200 yards (180 m) at a height of 100 feet (30 m). It has a curve of 23 chains (1,500 ft; 460 m) radius from the south to the east when viewed from above. In the original plans from 1874, the viaduct was to be 143 yards (131 m) long and 105 feet (32 m) high. The viaduct is constructed of rock-faced stone, ashlar and blue brick. The piers have springer stones facing out into each arch; it is believed that these supported the timber frame during the building phase. Just after the viaduct going east is the 810-yard (740 m) long Wheatley Tunnel. The viaduct is on the level, but has gradients on either side; 1-in-50 to the west, and 1-in-112 to the east leading up to the tunnel.

Whilst the line was closed to passenger trains in 1917, goods continued until final closure in the summer of 1960. (Note: Sources disagree about the closure date, some state 25 June 1960, others 27 July 1960.) The former trackbed is not accessible to the public.

In November 2023, the Historical Railways Estate announced that they would be carrying out over £1 million worth of renovations to the viaduct to remove vegetation, replaced water-damaged bricks and to reinforce one of the piers. The work was completed in September 2024.
