= Ingrow (West) railway station =

Railway station in West Yorkshire, England

Ingrow (West)
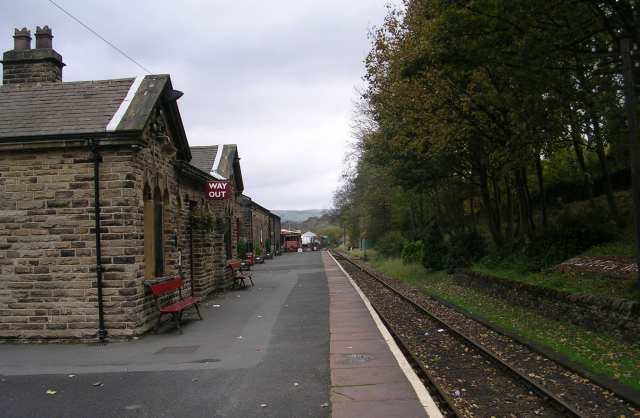

General information
- Location: Ingrow, City of Bradford; England
- Coordinates: 53°51′14″N 01°54′54″W
- Grid reference: SE057397
- System: Station on heritage railway
- Operator: Keighley and Worth Valley Railway
- Platforms: 1

Key dates
- 1867: Opened
- 1 January 1962: Closed to passengers
- 18 June 1962: Closed to goods
- 1968: Reopened
Location

Ingrow (West) railway station is a single-platform station serving the suburb of Ingrow in Keighley, West Yorkshire, England. It is served by the preserved Keighley and Worth Valley Railway. The station is 1 1/4 miles (2 km) west of Keighley station and 2 1/4 miles (3.6 km) west of Haworth railway station.

== History ==
Although work began in 1864, the Worth Valley was delayed in opening until 1867 due to some issues, not least a Methodist chapel at Ingrow, which stood right underneath where the tunnel immediately south of the station would go. This involved spending over £150,000 in resiting the chapel. The station opened in April 1867, along with the rest of the line, but was closed in January 1962 to passengers and in June 1962 to goods. After the station's closure, the existing station building was vandalised and later demolished, so, when re-opened in 1968, it was used as an unstaffed request stop. An appeal for donations raised enough money to buy the station building at Foulridge (on the Skipton-Colne line) which had closed in 1959 and had been built in a similar style to the other stations on the Worth Valley line; Ingrow West was an anomaly – its building was in a different style to Haworth, Oakworth and Oxenhope. The building at Foulridge was then demolished and rebuilt at Ingrow, opening in 1989.

On its opening, the K&WVR had six out-and-back services between Keighley and Oxenhope, which had risen to eight workings per day in the 1880s. By 1906, the branch and Ingrow were being served by sixteen services daily, which in 1946, two years before nationalisation, had been reduced to twelve.

== Stationmasters ==
- G. Johnson until 1874
- J. Urch 1874 – 1883
- H. Ellis 1883 – 1887
- Joseph Hartley 1887 – 1891
- Samuel Burnley 1891 – c. 1914
- A Gledhill from 1942 (formerly station master at Hope, also station master at Ingrow East)

== Incidents ==
The station lies at the end of a relatively straight downhill from Oakworth, some 1-mile (1.6 km) distant, and so was fitted with catch points. On 27 September 1875, some goods wagons became detached from their engine and rolled down the gradient. The signaller at Ingrow was supposed to have left the catch points set for derailing in the station there, but on hearing a whistle, he changed the points expecting the full goods train. The wagons ran into Keighley station where they crashed into a passenger train.

== The station today ==
The station (off South Street, Ingrow) is the first scheduled stop on the line from Keighley railway station. The Vintage Carriages Trust, which supplies historical carriages for film and TV programmes, has its Carriage Works museum which opened in 1990 next to the station. The station is also home to the Bahamas Locomotive Society and its collection of locomotives. The society runs the Engine Shed museum in the former goods shed, which has been extended to create workshop space for the overhaul of its collection of locomotives. The goods shed is an original feature of the 1867 station. The gates at the entrance to Ingrow West are from the former Midland Goods Yard in Keighley, which is now Sainsbury's.

Ingrow had a second station, Ingrow (East), which served the Great Northern Railway's Queensbury Lines to Bradford and Halifax.

Preceding station	Heritage railways	Following station
Damems towards Oxenhope	Keighley & Worth Valley Railway	Keighley Terminus
