= Charles Askew =

Dean of Nelson, New Zealand (died 1934)

Charles Frederick Askew was the Dean of Nelson from 1923 until 1933.

Askew was educated at Jesus College, Cambridge and ordained in 1990. His first post was a curacy at Laisterdyke. He was Vicar of St John Ingrow from 1906 to 1911, and then Saint Mark Wellington.

He died on 6 December 1934
