= Ovenden railway station =

Disused railway station in West Yorkshire, England

Ovenden
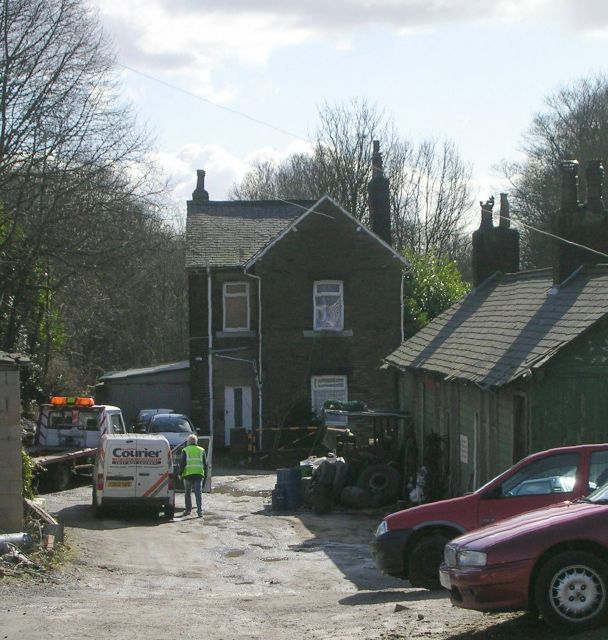
- Ovenden railway station platform building (right). The running lines were to the right of the platform building.

General information
- Location: Ovenden, Calderdale; England
- Coordinates: 53.74022°N 1.87413°W
- Grid reference: SE084271
- Platforms: 2

Other information
- Status: Disused

History
- Original company: Halifax and Ovenden Junction Railway
- Pre-grouping: Halifax and Ovenden Junction Railway
- Post-grouping: Halifax and Ovenden Junction Railway

Key dates
- 2 June 1881: Opened
- 23 May 1955: Closed to passengers
- 23 May 1955: Closed completely
Location

Ovenden railway station served the village of Ovenden in West Yorkshire, England. It was on the Halifax and Ovenden Junction Railway and closed in 1955. Because of the local area at Ovenden, the L&Y and the GN did not think it was important to have a nice station, so it was built of timber. However, it is the only station building which still exists, far outliving the stone buildings. Just along the line from Ovenden Station was Lee Bank Tunnel.

Preceding station	Disused railways	Following station
North Bridge	L&Y / GNR; Halifax and Ovenden Junction Railway	Holmfield
