= Denholme railway station =

Disused railway station in West Yorkshire, England

Denholme
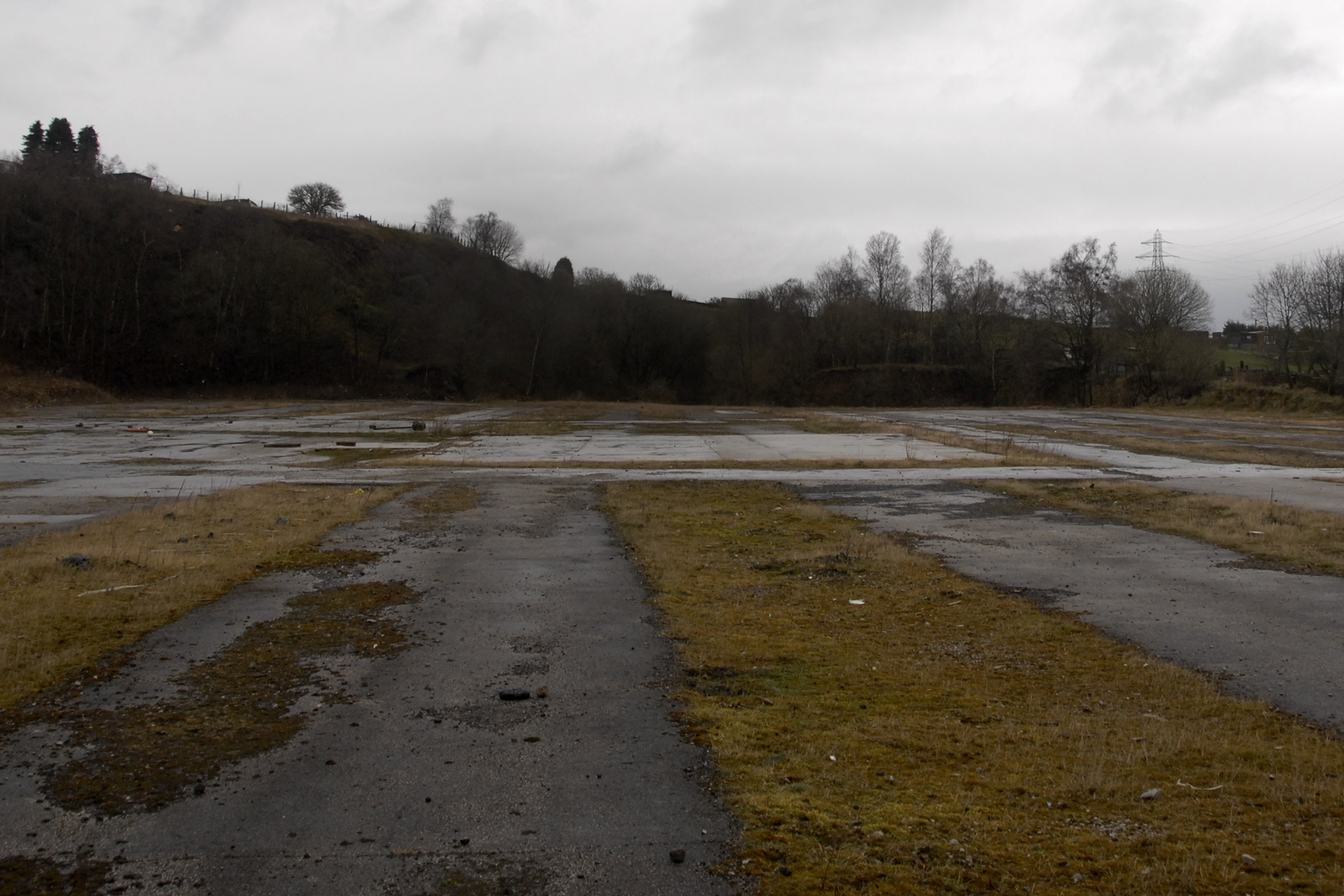
- The site of the station looking north

General information
- Location: Denholme, City of Bradford; England
- Coordinates: 53.799820°N 1.888600°W
- Grid reference: SE074337
- Platforms: 2

Other information
- Status: Disused

History
- Original company: Great Northern Railway

Key dates
- 1 Jan 1884: opened
- 23 May 1955: closed (passenger)
- 10 April 1961: closed (goods)
Location

Denholme railway station was a station on the Keighley-Queensbury section of the Queensbury Lines which ran between Keighley, Bradford and Halifax via Queensbury.

== History ==
The station was built by the Great Northern Railway in 1884, almost 1/2 mile (0.8 km) from the town of Denholme, West Yorkshire, England. By road, the station was accessed by an unlit and downhill road (Station Road) from the village. The station had an island platform which was accessed by a long iron footbridge which spanned the down tracks. The site also housed a goods yard, with stone-built shed, stables, and numerous sidings - with coal and timber being the principal traffic, as evident from photographs of the site whilst it was still in operation. The station master's house (Station House) was built adjacent to and overlooking the site. There were railway tunnels at either end of the site.

The station closed to passengers on 23 May 1955 along with the rest of the line from Keighley to Queensbury. It remained open for goods traffic - predominantly timber - until 1961. The site was then purchased by a timber merchant and converted to a large timber yard. The timber yard closed in 2012 and the site is now (2016) vacant, but with outline planning permission for a small housing estate. Station House is still standing, having been converted to a private residence.

Preceding station	Disused railways	Following station
Thornton	Great Northern Railway; Queensbury lines	Wilsden
