= Holmfield =

Area of Halifax, West Yorkshire, England

Coordinates: 53.7510°N 1.8757°W

Holmfield is an area of Halifax in West Yorkshire, England, 2 miles (3.2 km) north of the town centre.

Early maps show no village in the area. Holmfield was developed in the 19th century after a mill, known as Holme Field Mill, was built on Strines Beck in the township of Ovenden, in the ancient parish of Halifax in the West Riding of Yorkshire. The mill was a short distance south of the village of Holdsworth. In 1878 Holmfield railway station was opened to serve the area. St Andrew's Church was built in 1897.

Trinity Academy is located in Holmfield.
