= Pellon railway station =

Disused railway station in West Yorkshire, England

Pellon
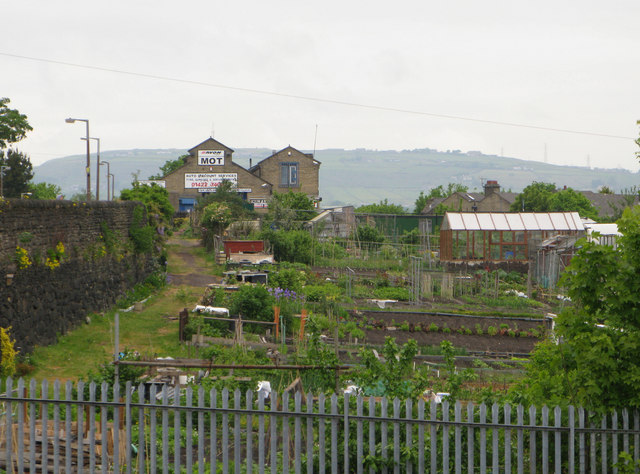
- The site of the station in 2010

General information
- Location: Halifax, Calderdale; England
- Coordinates: 53.72912°N 1.88295°W
- Grid reference: SE078258

Other information
- Status: Disused

History
- Original company: Halifax High Level Railway
- Pre-grouping: Lancashire & Yorkshire Railway and Great Northern Railway

Key dates
- 5 September 1890: Station opened
- 1 January 1917: Station closed
Location

Pellon railway station is a closed station that served the area of Pellon in Halifax, West Yorkshire, England.

== History ==
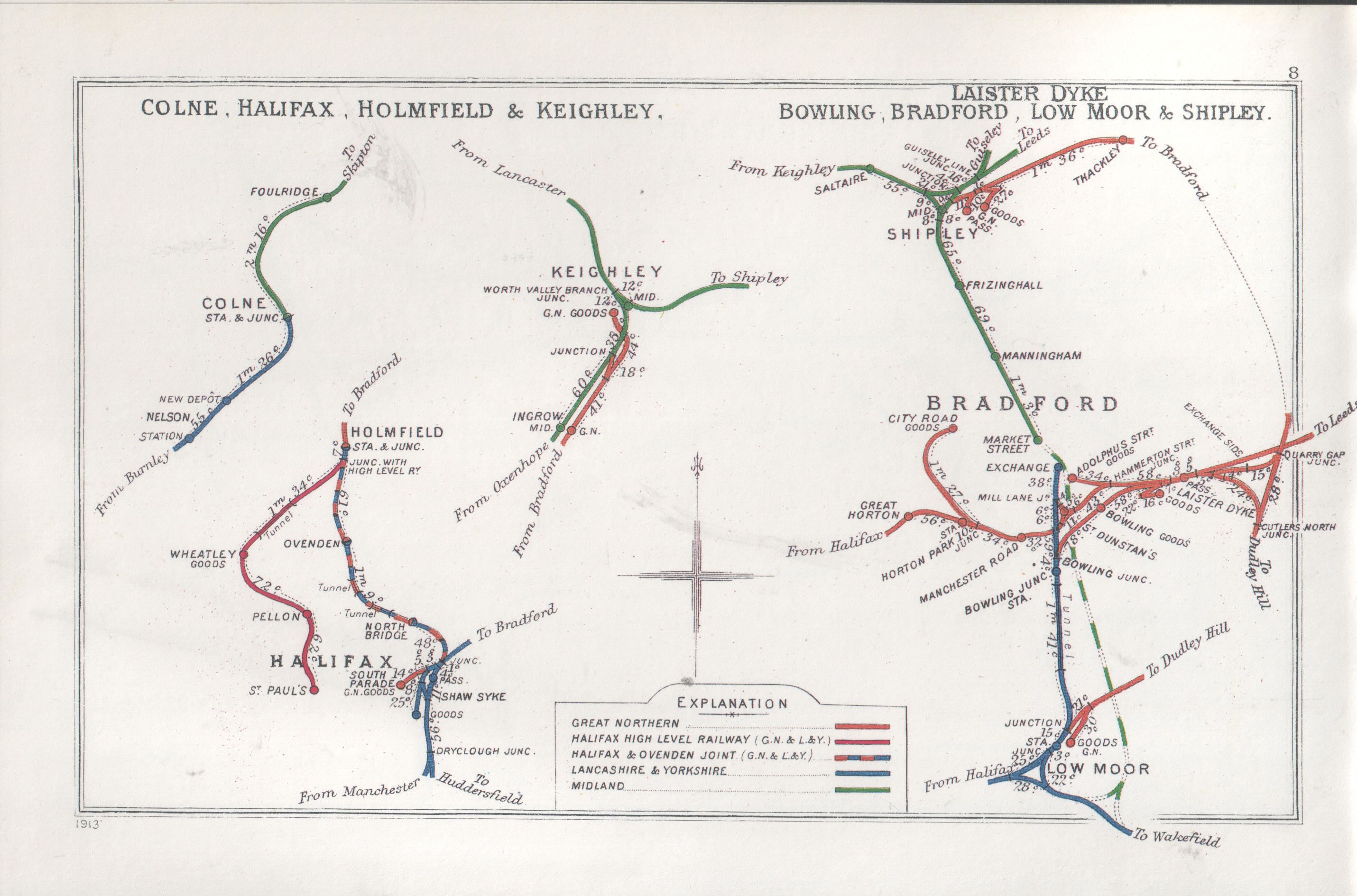
A 1913 Railway Clearing House Junction Diagram showing (lower left) the Halifax High Level Railway (red) including Pellon station

It was one of two stations on the short lived Halifax High Level Railway, which was built to serve the west side of Halifax. The station opened on 5 September 1890. The line had been originally been proposed to go straight through to Huddersfield however the plan was abolished. The line did not have many passengers as those who wanted to travel to Huddersfield had a 5-mile (8 km) and an extra journey time of 30 minutes to get there. The branch and its two stations closed to passengers on 1 January 1917 due to the introduction of Electric trams to Halifax. The branch closed to goods on 27 June 1960 along with the line around Holmfield.

Preceding station	Disused railways	Following station
St Pauls	L&YR and GN; Halifax High Level Railway	Holmfield
