= Thornton Viaduct =

Disused railway viaduct in West Yorkshire, England

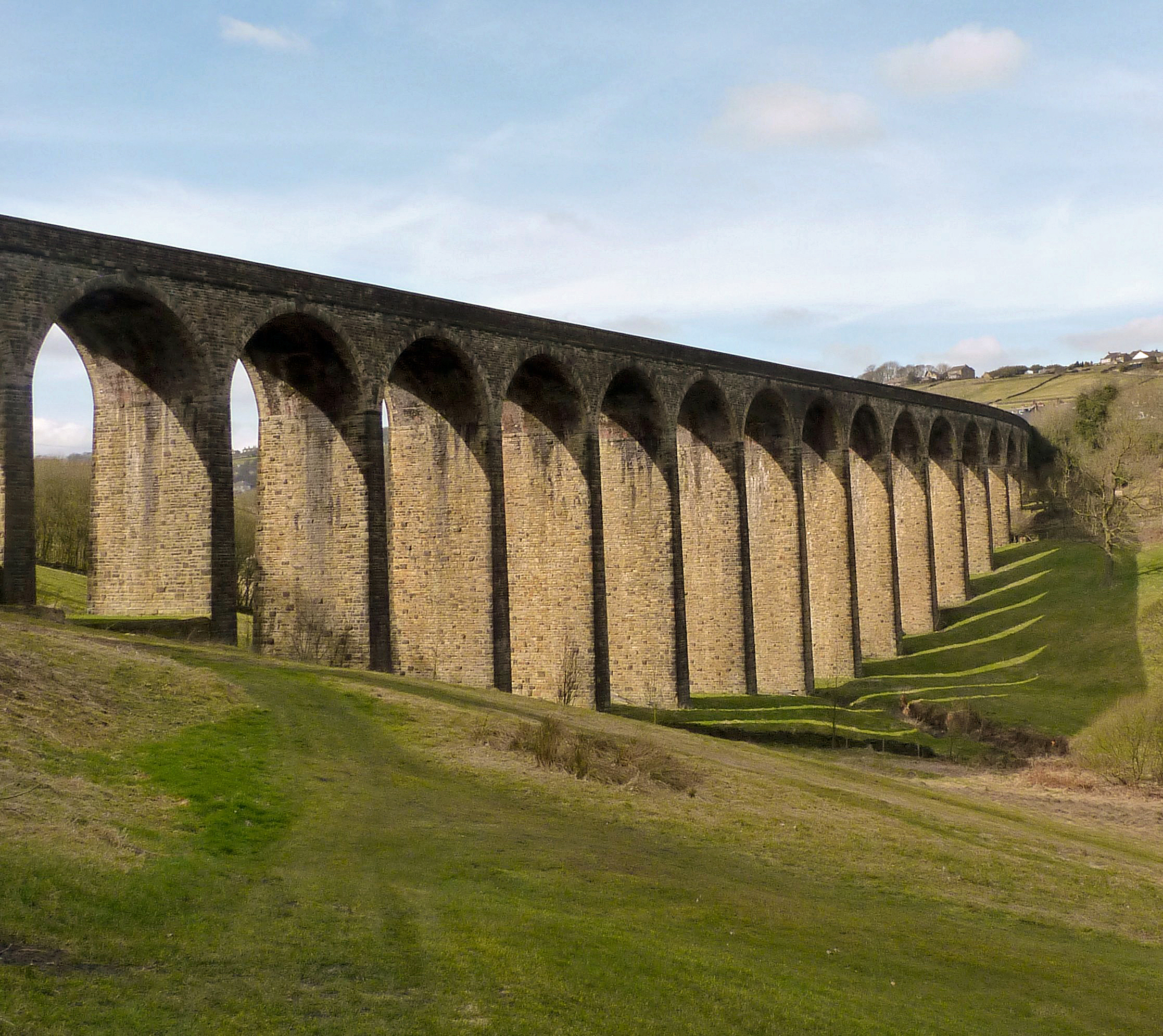
- Thornton Viaduct
- Coordinates: 53.7894°N 1.8564°W
- Crosses: Pinch Beck
- Locale: Bradford, West Yorkshire
- Maintained by: Sustrans

Characteristics
- Design: arch bridge
- Material: Stone
- Total length: 310 yards (280 m)
- Height: 100 feet (30 m)
- Longest span: 40 feet (12 m)

History
- Opened: 1878
- Closed: 1966

Location
- Interactive map of Thornton Viaduct

Thornton Viaduct is a disused railway bridge in Thornton, in the City of Bradford, West Yorkshire, in northern England. It opened in 1878, having been built for the Great Northern Railway, closed in 1966, and re-opened as part of a cycling route in 2008. It is a Grade II listed building.

== Design ==
The viaduct crosses Pinch Beck in a deep valley below the town. It is one of a series of viaducts on the Great Northern Railway's route from Bradford to Keighley (one of the Queensbury lines). The line was built at enormous expense and over difficult terrain, requiring significant civil engineering works, including Thornton Viaduct and the nearby Hewenden Viaduct. It was designed by John Fraser and built by the contractors Benton and Woodiwiss of Derby. Work began in 1876 and the viaduct opened in 1878 and closed with the line in 1966.

The viaduct is 310 yards (280 metres) long and consists of 20 semi-circular arches, each with a span of 40 feet (12 metres), and reaching a maximum height of almost 100 feet (30 metres). The arches are supported on upward-tapering piers. It carried a single track. It has sharp reverse curves at each end, giving it an S-shape, to reach Thornton station. It was built from locally quarried sandstone, faced with rock, with standtone bricks to the soffits. It is decorated with thin capping piers at the imposts and a string course which forms a flat band below the parapet.

== History ==
The line closed to passengers in 1955 but continued to handle freight trains until 1966.

The viaduct is a Grade II listed building, a status which provides it legal protection, first designated on 8 January 1982. The listing authority, Historic England, calls it "one of a spectacular series" of viaducts and a "a finely proportioned structure" which "makes a most important contribution to the landscape". It reopened in 2008 as part of the Great Northern Railway Trail, a walking and cycling route between Cullingworth and Queensbury which re-uses the former track bed. The nearby Hewenden Viaduct is also listed and part of the same cycling route.

== See also ==
- List of railway bridges and viaducts in the United Kingdom
