= Thornton railway station =

Disused railway station in West Yorkshire, England

Thornton
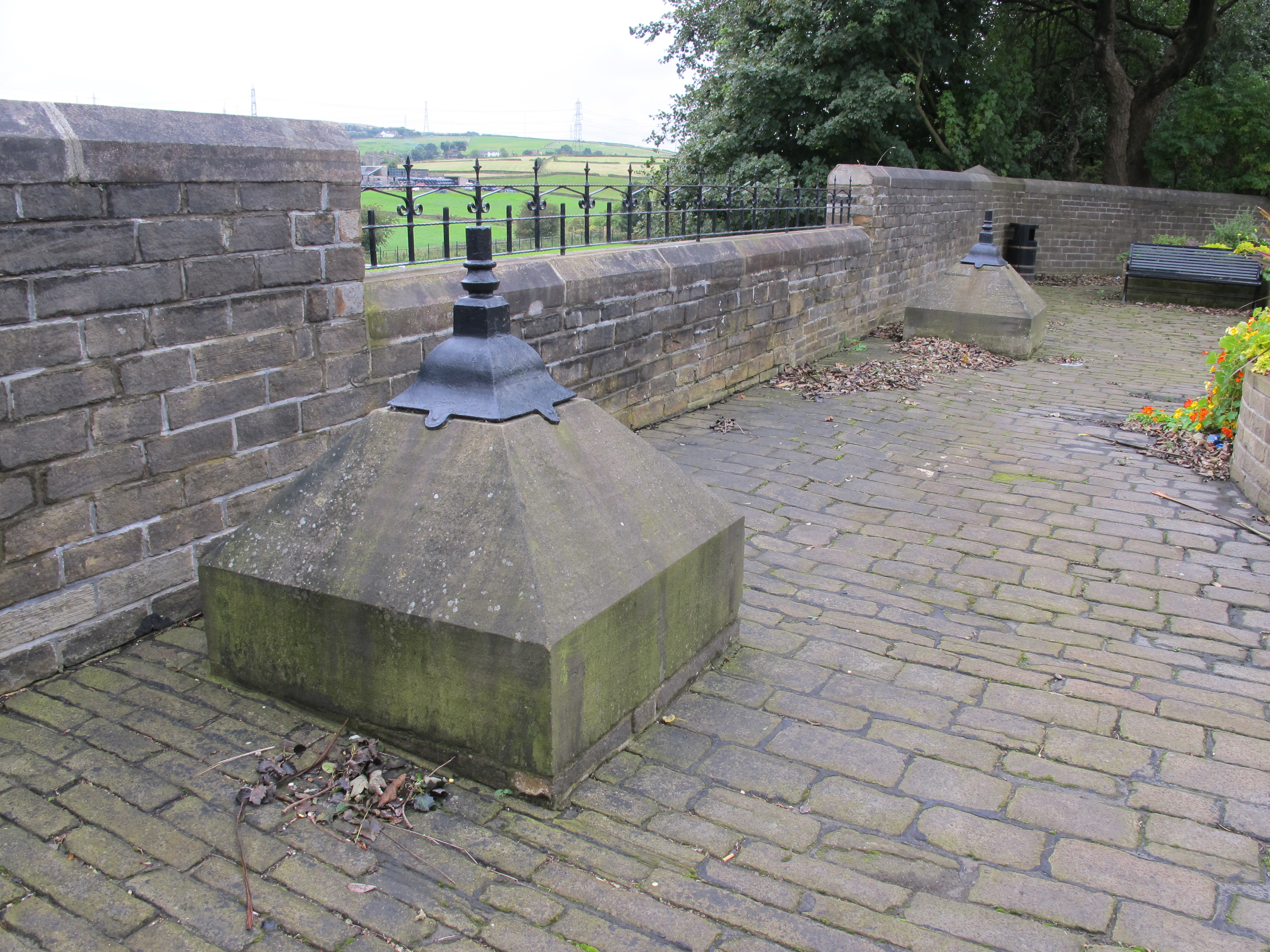

General information
- Location: Thornton, City of Bradford; England
- Coordinates: 53.790760°N 1.863580°W
- Grid reference: SE090327
- Platforms: 2

Other information
- Status: Disused

History
- Original company: Bradford and Thornton Railway
- Pre-grouping: Great Northern Railway
- Post-grouping: London and North Eastern Railway

Key dates
- 14 October 1878: Station opened
- 23 May 1955: Station closed for passengers
- 28 June 1955: closed for goods
Location

Thornton railway station was a station on the Keighley-Queensbury section of the Queensbury Lines which ran between Keighley, Bradford and Halifax via Queensbury. The station served the village of Thornton, West Yorkshire, England from 1878 to 1955.

The station had an island platform and was very close to the 300-yard (270 m) 20 arch Thornton viaduct which spans the Pinch Beck valley. It opened for passengers in 1878 and closed in 1955. The viaduct, closed off for many years, was reopened in 2008 as part of the Great Northern Walking Trail after it had been safety checked and the former railway bed was sealed. No other parts of the former large station building remain. The site has been occupied by Thornton Primary School (previously Royd Mount Middle School) since 1977. The original goods platform and a large retaining wall are still visible and have been incorporated into the school's grounds design. The viaduct is a grade II listed building, and is unusual in that it has an 'S' shape to accommodate the natural contours of the valley. It is in a picturesque location that has remained unchanged since its construction. The final trip by train over the viaduct was in 1966, by a goods train.

The original 'Thornton' platform sign was a large concrete affair, some 16 feet (5 m) long. This is on display at the Industrial Museum at Eccleshill on the outskirts of the city of Bradford.

Preceding station	Disused railways	Following station
Queensbury	Great Northern Railway; Queensbury lines	Denholme

== Photographs ==
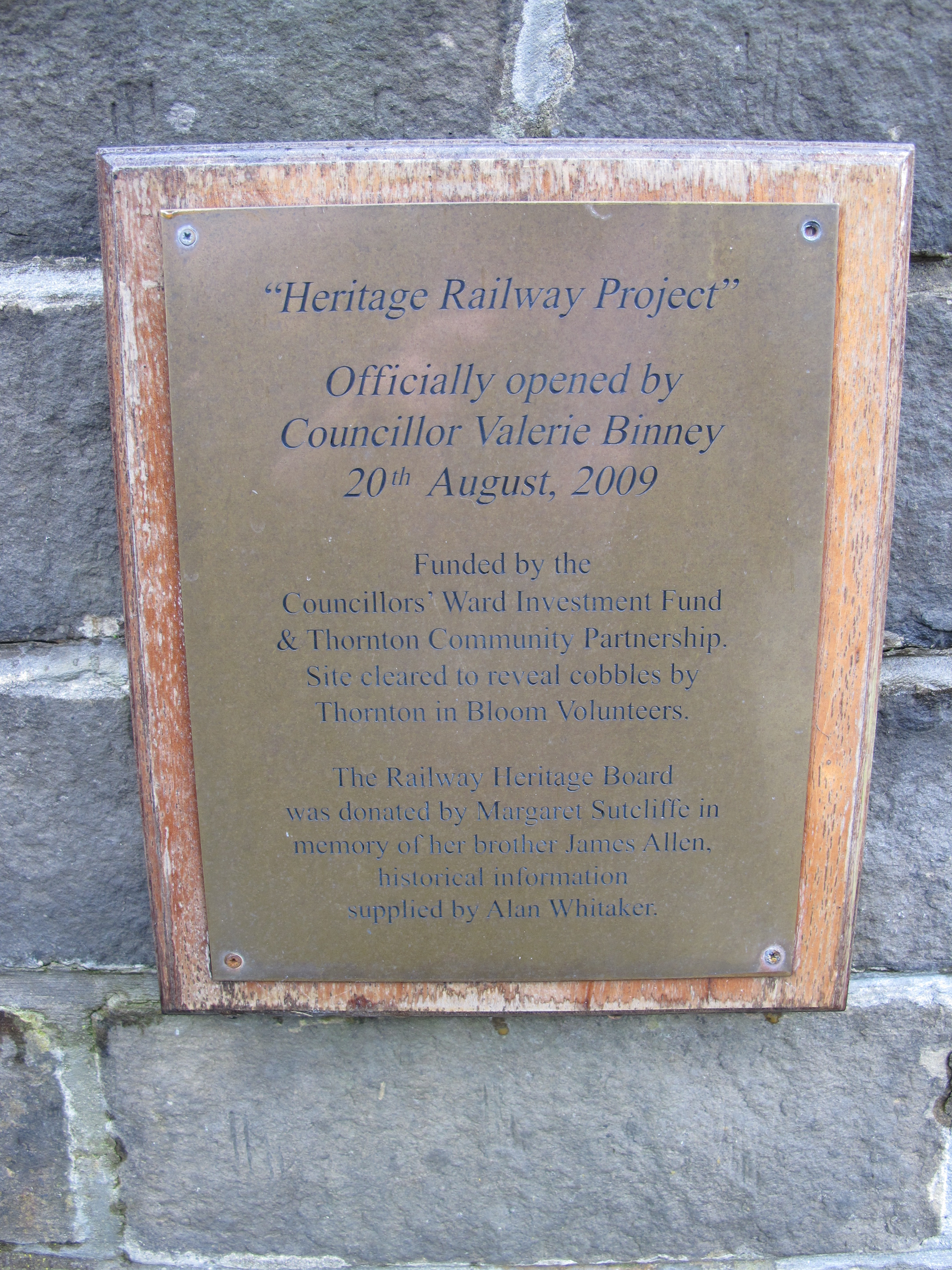

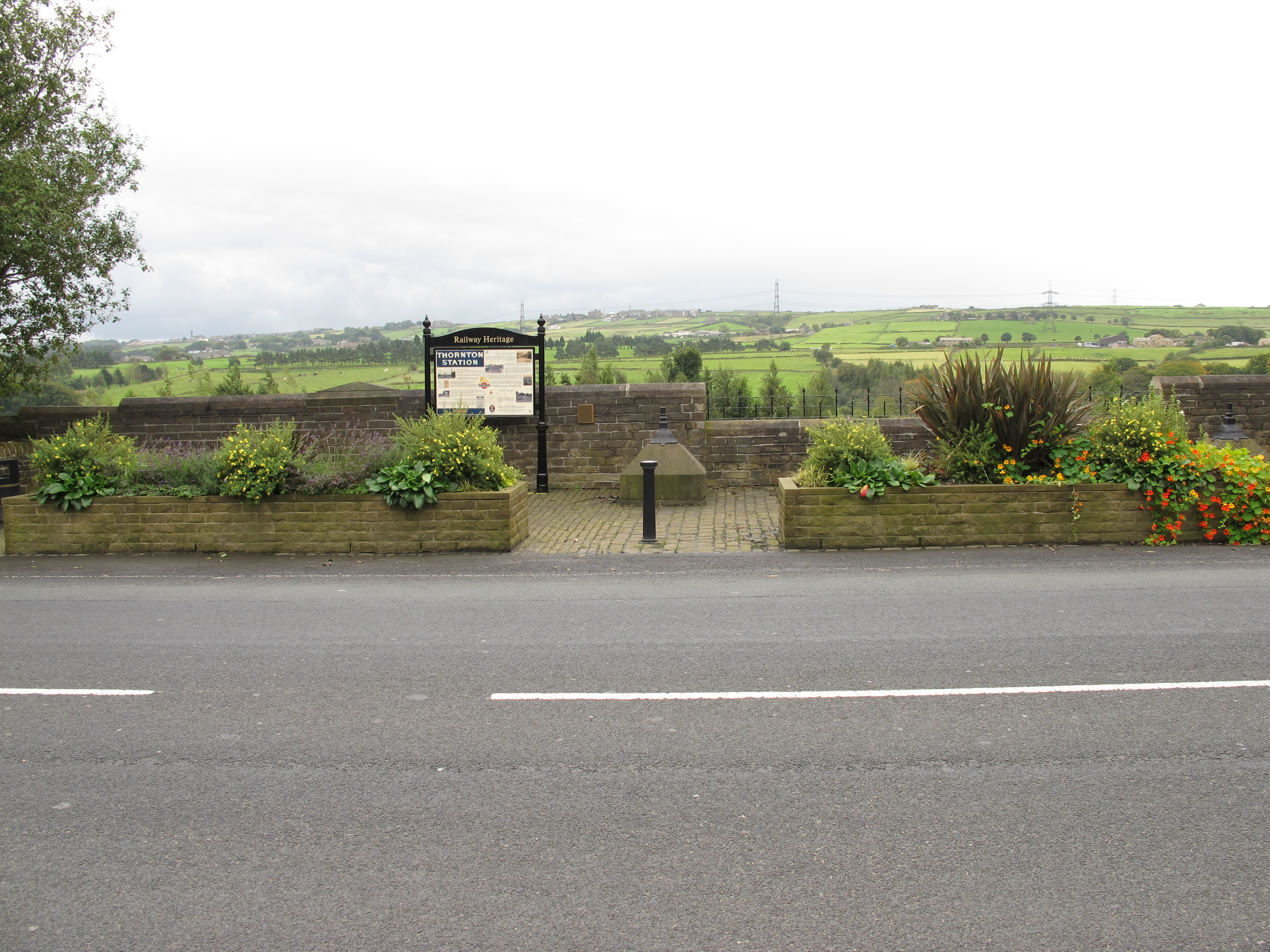
