= Wilsden railway station =

Disused railway station in West Yorkshire, England

Wilsden
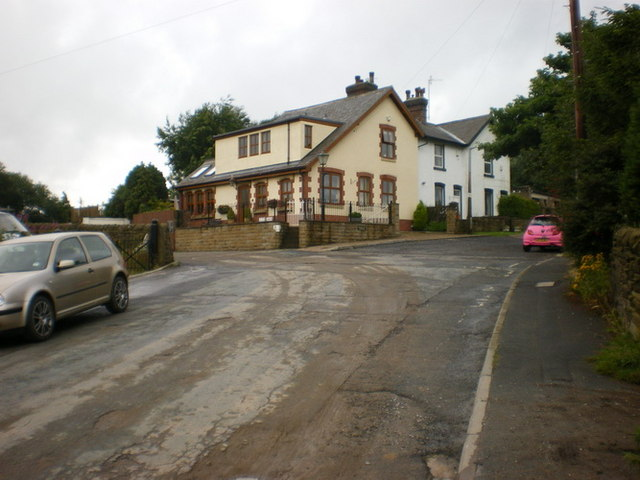
- Wilsden station-master's house in 2009. The station was in a cutting behind the house.

General information
- Location: Wilsden, City of Bradford; England
- Coordinates: 53.81519°N 1.88575°W
- Grid reference: SE076354
- Platforms: 2

Other information
- Status: Disused

History
- Original company: Great Northern Railway

Key dates
- 1 July 1886: opened
- 23 May 1955: closed (passenger)
- 11 November 1963: closed (goods)
Location

Wilsden railway station was a station on the Queensbury Lines which ran between Keighley, Bradford and Halifax.

== History ==
The station was built by the Great Northern Railway in 1886, 2 miles (3.2 km) away from the village of Wilsden. It was closer to the small hamlet of Harecroft, West Yorkshire, England.

The station had two platforms and a large goods shed. It was the last station to open on the Queensbury-Keighley section of the line. Just along the line was the 300-yard (270 m) long 17 arch Hewenden Viaduct.

Preceding station	Disused railways	Following station
Denholme	Great Northern Railway; Queensbury lines	Cullingworth
