= Ingrow (East) railway station =

Disused railway station in West Yorkshire, England

Ingrow (East)
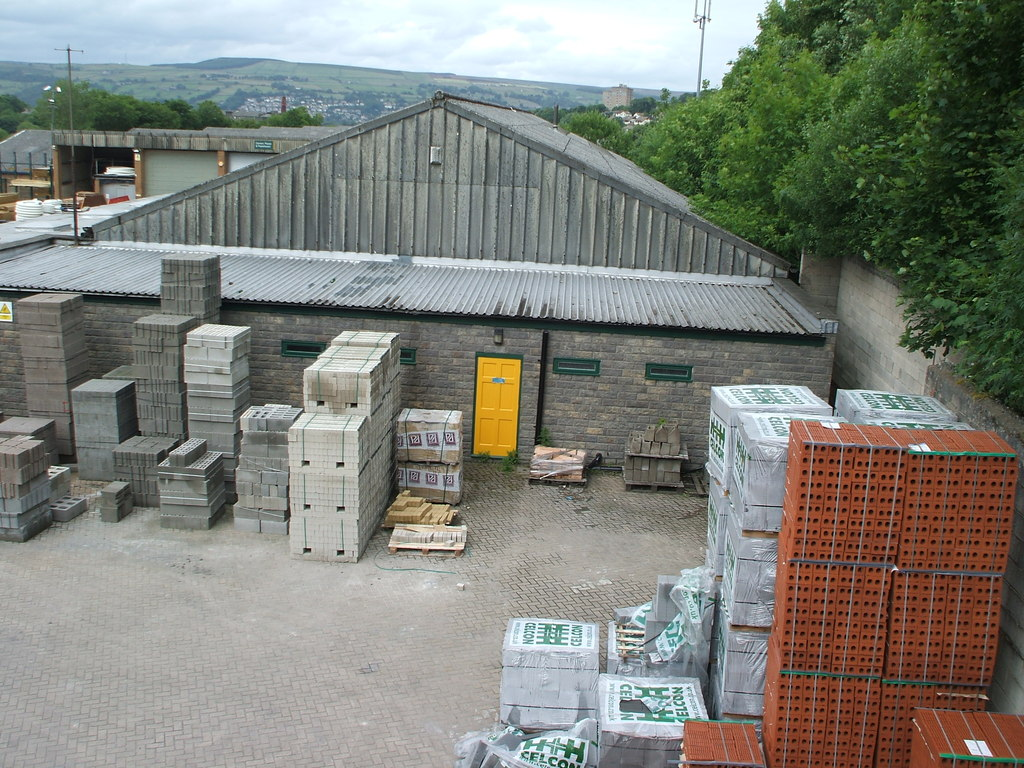
- The site of the station in 2008

General information
- Location: Ingrow, City of Bradford; England
- Coordinates: 53.853000°N 1.913690°W
- Grid reference: SE057396
- Platforms: 2

Other information
- Status: Disused

History
- Original company: Great Northern Railway
- Pre-grouping: Great Northern Railway
- Post-grouping: London and North Eastern Railway

Key dates
- 7 April 1884: Opened as Ingrow
- 2 March 1951: Renamed Ingrow (East)
- 23 May 1955: Closed for passengers
- 28 June 1965: closed for freight
Location

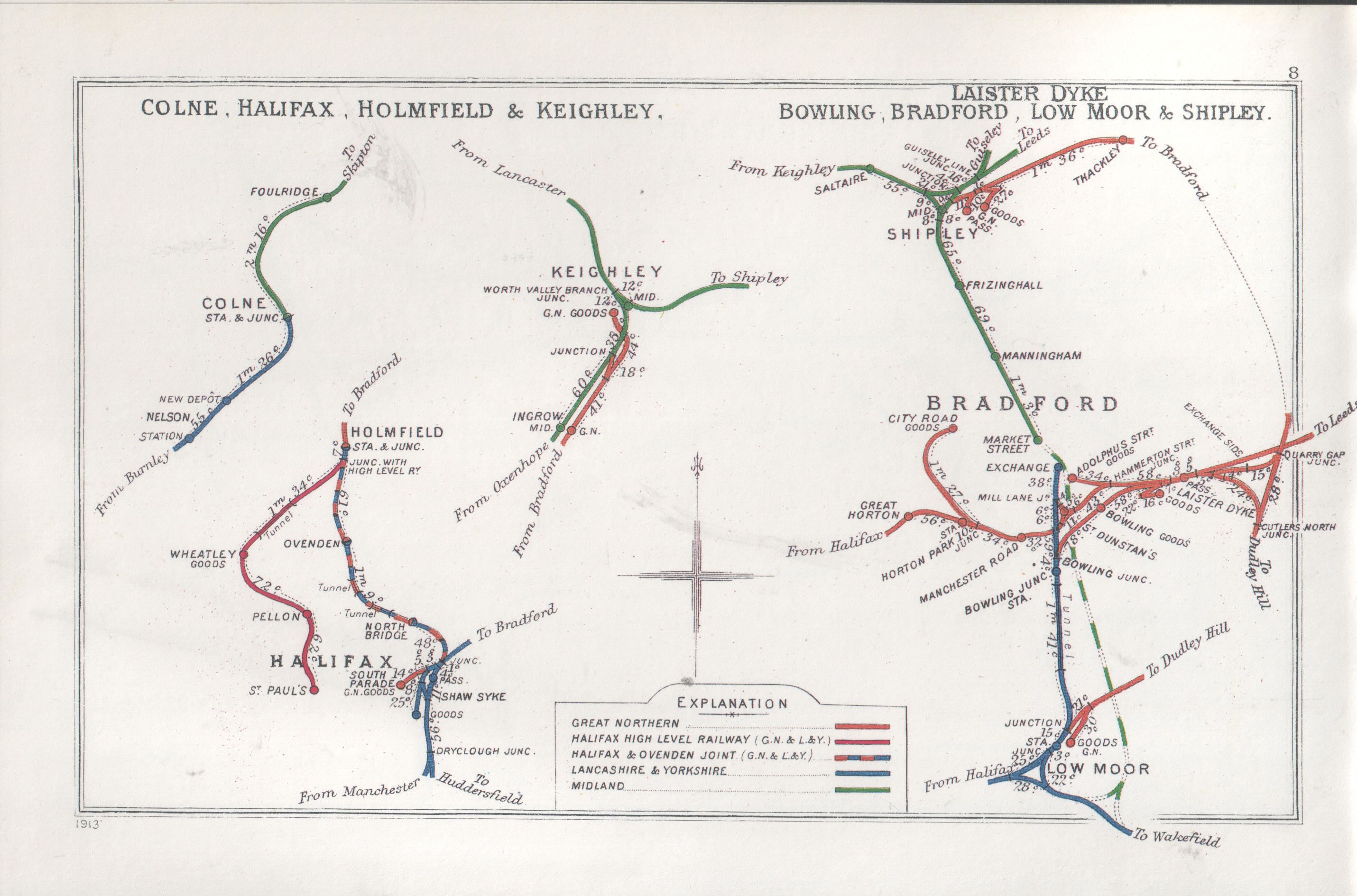
Railway clearing house map showing lines south of Keighley in 1913

Ingrow (East) railway station was a small English railway station on the Keighley-Queensbury section of the Queensbury Lines which ran between Bradford, Halifax and Keighley via Queensbury. The station served the prosperous industrial district of Keighley and was only a short distance away from the Ingrow (West) railway station on the Midland Railway Oxenhope Branch, which is now the preserved Keighley and Worth Valley Railway.

To cope with the production from the mills the station had a vast goods yard. The whole station and goods yard site has now been incorporated into the Travis Perkins builders merchants which occupies the site. Just beyond the station was the GN Goods Junction where the GN trains linked with the Oxenhope branch for the last mile into Keighley. Beyond the junction the line continued alongside the Oxenhope Branch before diverging beneath it into the GN goods yard, where, unlike the MR goods yard, all the buildings are intact.

In 1957, two years after closure to passengers, the station area was used in a test on a new type of railway sleeper. British Railways deliberately derailed a driverless locomotive for the test. Press and public alike were not allowed to witness or photograph the event.

Preceding station	Disused railways	Following station
Cullingworth	Great Northern Railway; Queensbury lines	Keighley
