= Cullingworth railway station =

Disused railway station in West Yorkshire, England

Cullingworth
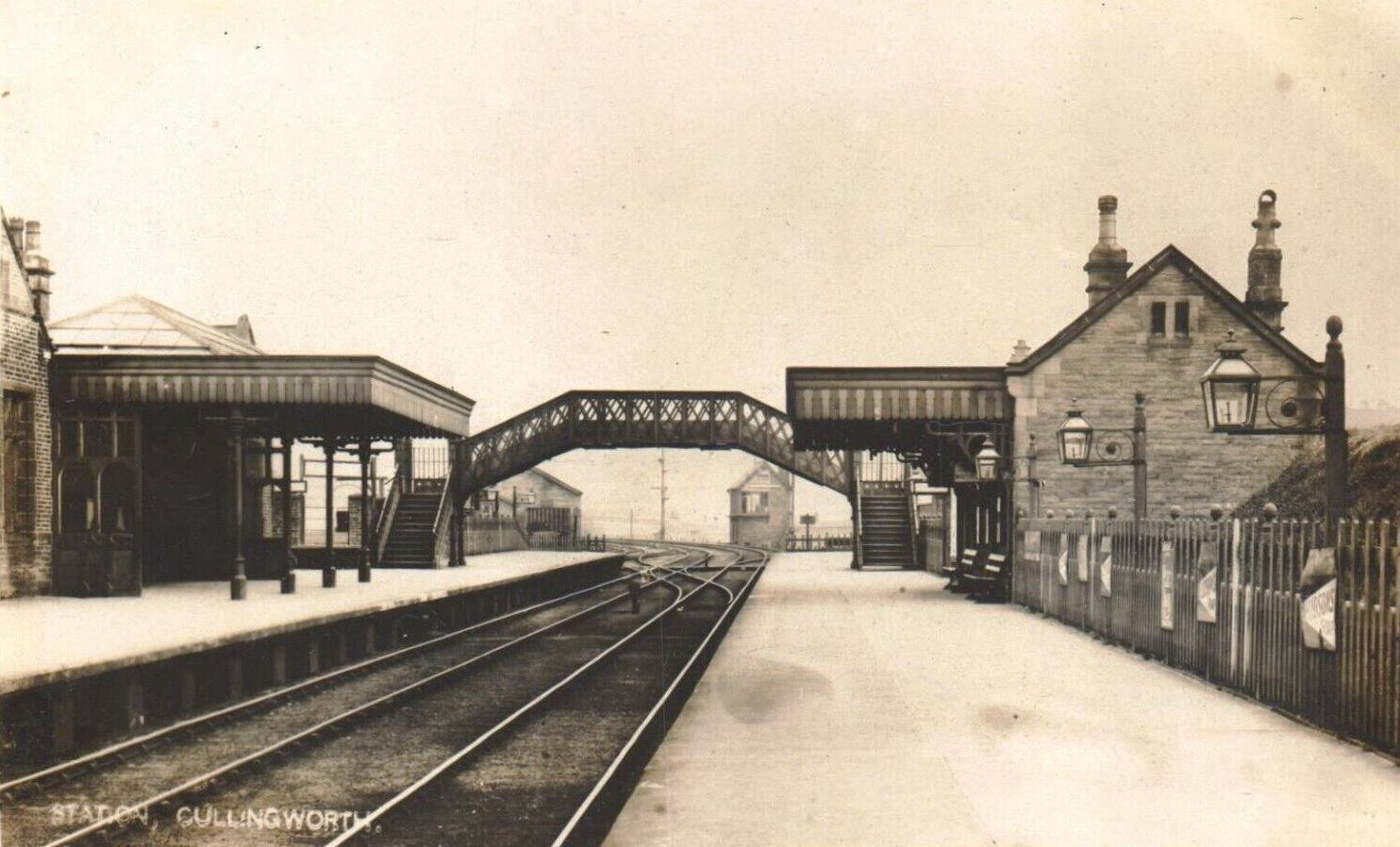

General information
- Location: Cullingworth, City of Bradford; England
- Coordinates: 53.826260°N 1.903420°W
- Grid reference: SE064366
- Platforms: 2

Other information
- Status: Disused

History
- Original company: Great Northern Railway
- Pre-grouping: Great Northern Railway
- Post-grouping: London and North Eastern Railway

Key dates
- 7 April 1884: Station opened
- 23 May 1955: Station closed for passengers
- 11 November 1963: closed for freight
Location

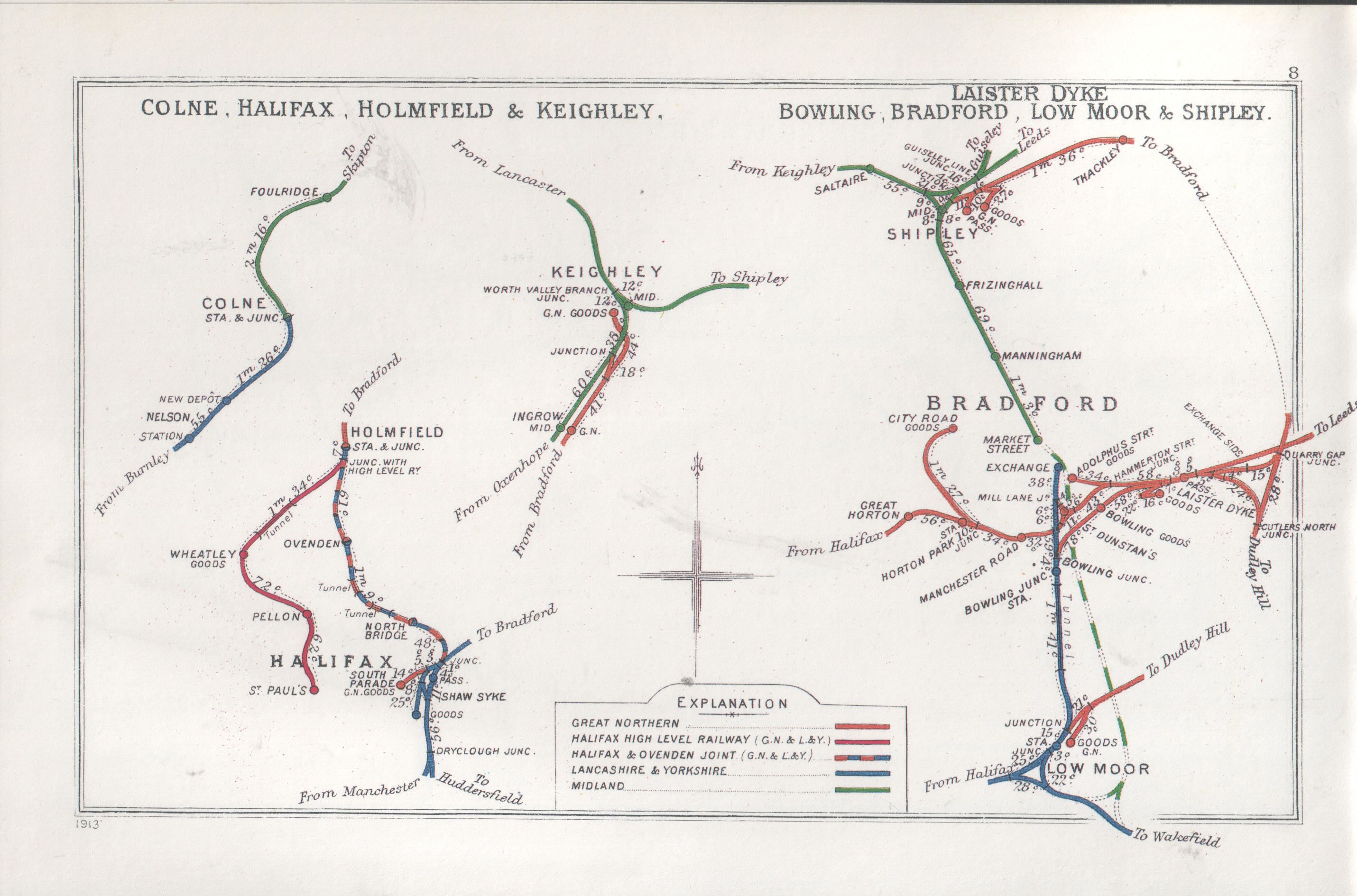
Railway clearing house map showing lines south of Keighley in 1913

Cullingworth railway station was a station on the Queensbury Lines which ran between Keighley, Bradford and Halifax. The station served the village of Cullingworth, West Yorkshire, England. It opened for passengers in 1884 and closed in May 1955. Goods traffic continued until 1963, when the surviving line closed completely.

The station was about 1 1/2 miles (2.4 km) from Wilsden railway station and was near to the 150-yard-long (140 m) 9 arch Cullingworth Viaduct, which exists to this day.

Preceding station	Disused railways	Following station
Wilsden	Great Northern Railway; Queensbury lines	Ingrow (East)
