= Ingrow =

Suburb of Keighley, West Yorkshire, England

Coordinates: 53°51′N 1°55′W

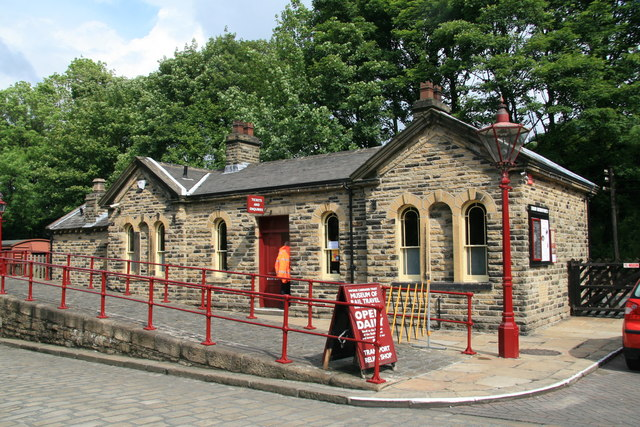
Ingrow Station

Ingrow is a suburb of Keighley, West Yorkshire, England that lies on the River Worth. The name Ingrow comes from Old Scandinavian which means 'corner of land in the meadow.' The suburb is located on the A629 road and is 0.93 miles (1.5 km) south west of Keighley town centre.

The Ingrow Railway Centre has two railway museums: the Museum of Rail Travel owned by Vintage Carriages Trust, and Ingrow Loco, owned by the Bahamas Locomotive Society. The museums (off South Street A629) are adjacent to Ingrow Station on the Keighley and Worth Valley Railway, a 5-mile (8 km) long heritage railway that serves Keighley, Ingrow, Damems, Oakworth, Haworth and Oxenhope.

Between 1884 and 1955 Ingrow had a second railway station (Ingrow East), adjacent to, but 40 feet (12 m) higher than the current railway station. This station was on the Great Northern route between Keighley, Halifax and Bradford Exchange.

The area is served by the grade II listed parish church of St John the Evangelist, which was built in 1843 to serve the parish of Ingrow with Hainworth.

Ingrow Cricket Club, based in the nearby Hainworth village, was formed in the 1800s. They relocated to their current Hainworth home in 1926, with construction of a new pavilion completed in 1986. They have two teams competing in the Craven and District cricket league.

== See also ==
- Listed buildings in Keighley
- John Taylor, Baron Ingrow
