= Holmfield railway station =

Disused railway station in West Yorkshire, England

Holmfield

General information
- Location: Holmfield, Calderdale; England
- Coordinates: 53.75190°N 1.87409°W
- Grid reference: SE084283
- Platforms: 3

Other information
- Status: Disused

History
- Original company: Halifax and Ovenden Junction Railway
- Pre-grouping: Lancashire & Yorkshire Railway and Great Northern Railway
- Post-grouping: London, Midland and Scottish Railway and London and North Eastern Railway

Key dates
- 14 October 1878: Opened
- 23 May 1955: Closed to passengers
- 27 June 1960: Closed completely
Location

Holmfield railway station is a closed railway station that served the village of Holmfield in Halifax, West Yorkshire, England.

== History ==
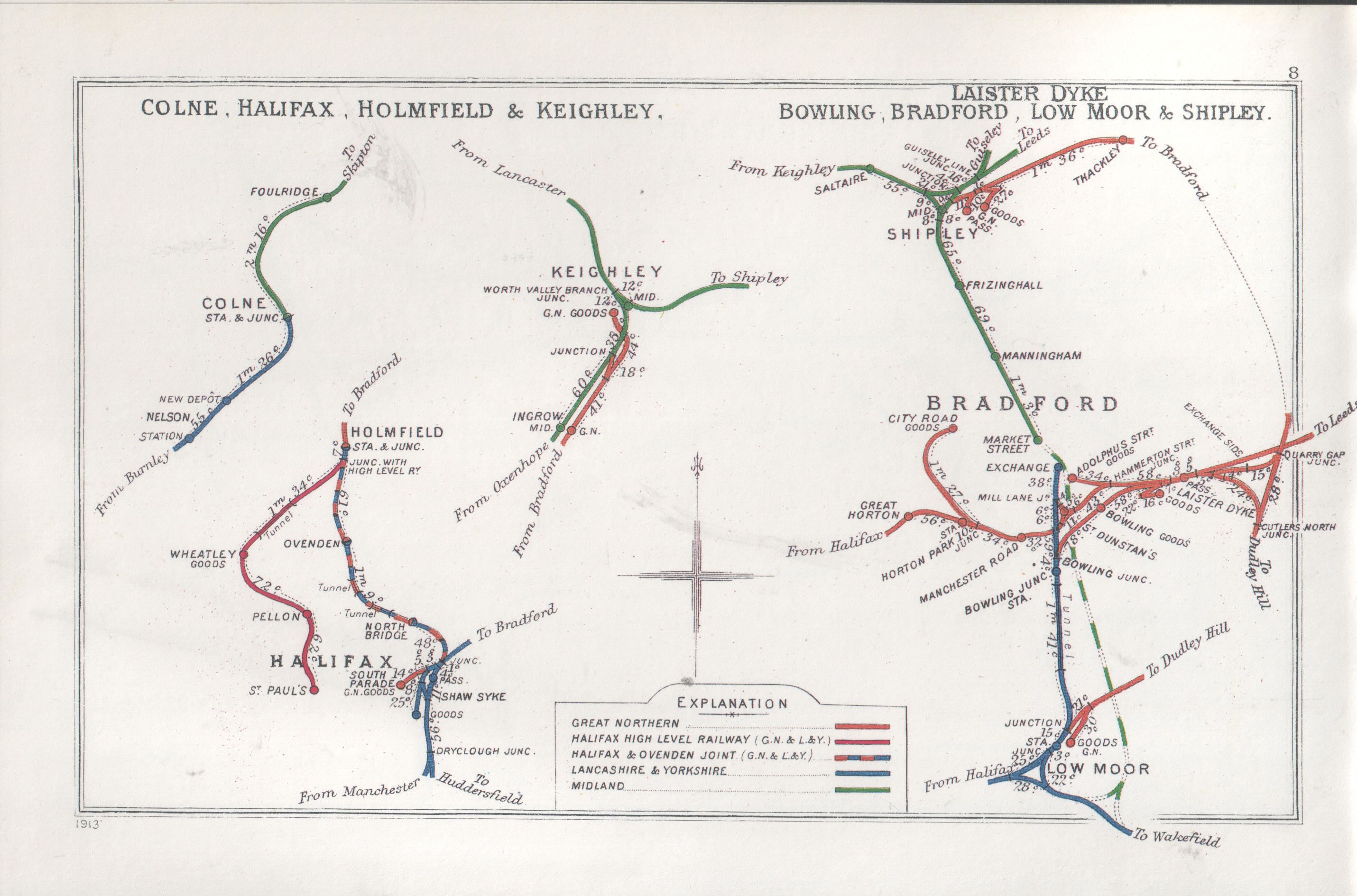
A 1913 Railway Clearing House Junction Diagram showing (lower left) lines in the vicinity of Holmfield station, including the Halifax & Ovenden Joint Railway (blue & orange) and the Halifax High Level Railway (red)

The station was opened by the Great Northern Railway on 14 October 1878 as the terminus of the line from Queensbury, following delays to the Halifax and Ovenden Junction Railway due to land slips in the Halifax area. It became a through station with the opening of the line to Halifax on 1 September 1879 (goods) with passenger services not starting along the entire route until 1 December 1879. It became a junction with the opening of the Halifax High Level railway to St. Paul's (Halifax) on 5 September 1890. The station closed to passengers 23 May 1955 with goods facilities remaining via Queensbury until 28 May 1956 and via Halifax until 27 June 1960.

Very little now remains to show that this was once a busy country junction. The overbridge carrying Holdsworth Road at the northern end of the station still exists, with a flooded cutting stretching north from the bridge. The bridge walls show where the station access steps were.

In March 2008 a planning application was submitted to redevelop the existing disused industrial buildings on the remaining unused railway land to build mixed use industrial units.

== Route ==
Preceding station	Disused railways	Following station
Pellon	L&YR and GN; Halifax High Level Railway	Terminus
Ovenden	L&YR and GN; Queensbury Lines; Halifax and Ovenden Junction Railway	Queensbury
