= North Bridge railway station =

Disused railway station in West Yorkshire, England

Halifax North Bridge
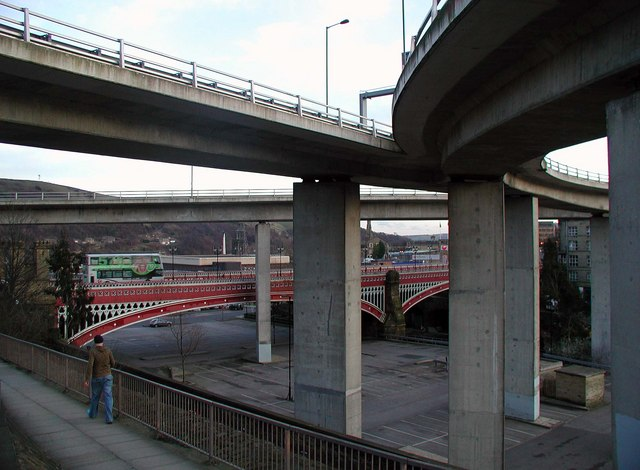
- The site of Halifax North Bridge railway station, now a car park.

General information
- Location: Halifax, Calderdale; England
- Coordinates: 53.72762°N 1.86052°W
- Grid reference: SE093257
- Platforms: 2

Other information
- Status: Disused

History
- Original company: Halifax and Ovenden Junction Railway
- Pre-grouping: Lancashire and Yorkshire Railway and Great Northern Railway
- Post-grouping: London, Midland and Scottish Railway and London and North Eastern Railway

Key dates
- 25 Mar 1880: Opened
- 23 May 1955: Closed to passengers
- 1974: Closed completely
Location

North Bridge railway station, also known as Halifax North Bridge, served on the Halifax and Ovenden Junction Railway in West Yorkshire, England. The North bridge itself had to be rebuilt 11 feet (3.4 m) higher by the L&YR and the GNR to clear the tracks. The station closed in 1955 and has been since demolished, with a leisure centre built on the site. The only remaining remnant of the station is the station footbridge and the nearby Old Lane Tunnel.

Preceding station	Disused railways	Following station
Halifax	L&YR and GN; Halifax and Ovenden Junction Railway	Ovenden
