= Queensbury lines =

Railway lines in Yorkshire, England

The Queensbury lines was the name given to a number of railway lines in West Yorkshire, England, that linked Bradford, Halifax and Keighley via Queensbury. All the lines were either solely owned by the Great Northern Railway (GNR) or jointly by the GNR and the Lancashire and Yorkshire Railway (L&YR). The terrain was extremely challenging for railway construction, and the lines were very expensive to build. The lines were

- the Halifax and Ovenden Junction Railway, (Note: There were other variations on the name.) opened from 1874;
- the Bradford and Thornton Railway, opened in stages from 1876;
- the Halifax, Thornton and Keighley Railway from Holmfield to Queensbury and from Thornton to Keighley, opened in stages from 1878;
- the Halifax High Level Railway, opened from 1890, but closed to passengers in 1917.

For some time the network was busy, both for passengers and goods, but carryings declined steeply, and passenger services were discontinued in 1955. Goods traffic ceased in 1974.

The lines were marked with a number of major civil engineering works including several viaducts and tunnels. A feature of the line was the unusual station at Queensbury, which was on a triangular track layout, with two platforms on each of the three chords.

== Background ==
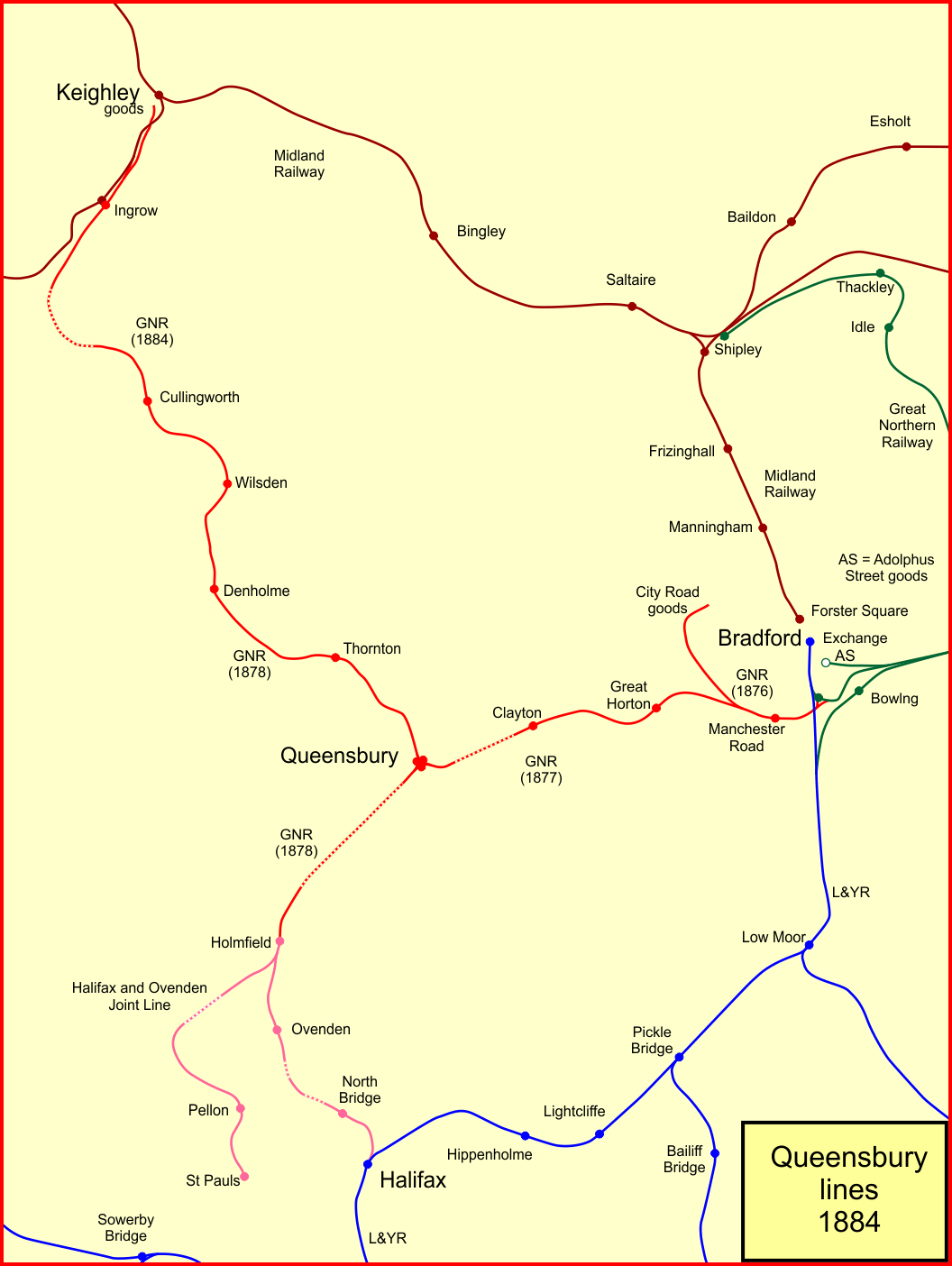
The Queensbury lines in 1884

West of Bradford, the Pennine terrain rises steeply to a plateau around 1,000 feet (300 m) above sea level, with numerous steep-sided valleys: an area of exceptional difficulty for railways. Nevertheless, it included a large area of Yorkshire with active industries, not well served by road transport.

== Halifax and Ovenden Junction Railway ==
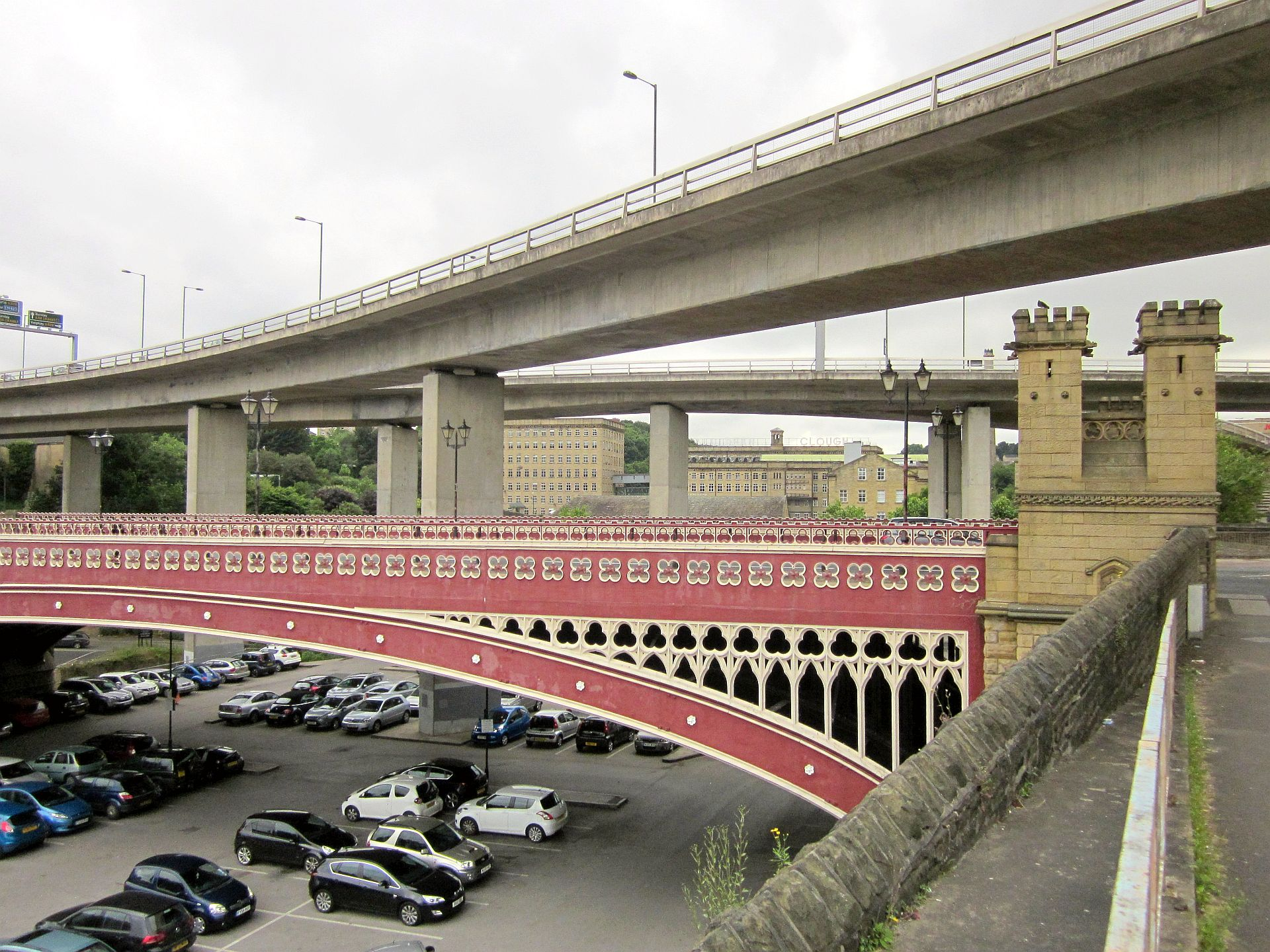
North Bridge, Halifax carrying the road over the former line

The first Halifax station on the Lancashire and Yorkshire Railway was opened in 1844. The main station, opened later, is approached from the north-east by a tunnel: it is located at the bottom of the town, which is hilly. From 1854 the Great Northern Railway had running powers to Halifax over the Leeds, Bradford and Halifax Junction Railway. Both the L&YR and the GNR were concerned about the difficulty of carting goods to and from the higher-lying districts, as well as congestion at the station itself. The Ovenden valley, north-west of the town, was a significant source of traffic, and a branch line there would potentially assist.

Halifax and Ovenden Junction Railway Act 1864
- Act of Parliament
- Parliament of the United Kingdom
- Long title: An Act for authorizing the Construction of a Railway, to be called "The Halifax and Ovenden Junction Railway;" and for other Purposes.
- Citation: 27 & 28 Vict. c. cxliii

Dates
- Royal assent: 30 June 1864

Text of statute as originally enacted

A company was formed in 1863 to build a railway along the Thornton valley, to connect Halifax with Keighley. At the time this was considered to be a very ambitious project, and during its time in Parliament, the scheme was much reduced in scope, to connect Halifax and Holmfield through the Ovenden Valley. It was to be titled the Halifax and Ovenden Junction Railway, and it was incorporated on 30 June 1864 by the Halifax and Ovenden Junction Railway Act 1864 (27 & 28 Vict. c. cxliii), with capital of £90,000. The GNR and L&YR each subscribed £30,000 towards the capital, and were to work the line jointly.

Halifax and Ovenden Railway Act 1867
- Act of Parliament
- Parliament of the United Kingdom
- Long title: An Act to enable the Halifax and Ovenden Junction Railway Company to vary the Line of their Railway; to increase their Capital; and for other Purposes.
- Citation: 30 & 31 Vict. c. clxxviii

Dates
- Royal assent: 12 August 1867

Text of statute as originally enacted

Halifax and Ovenden Junction Railway Act 1870
- Act of Parliament
- Parliament of the United Kingdom
- Long title: An Act to extend the time for the purchase of lands and for the construction of the Halifax and Ovenden Junction Railway, and to vest the said railway in the Lancashire and Yorkshire and the Great Northern Railway Companies.
- Citation: 33 & 34 Vict. c. cxli

Dates
- Royal assent: 1 August 1870

Text of statute as originally enacted

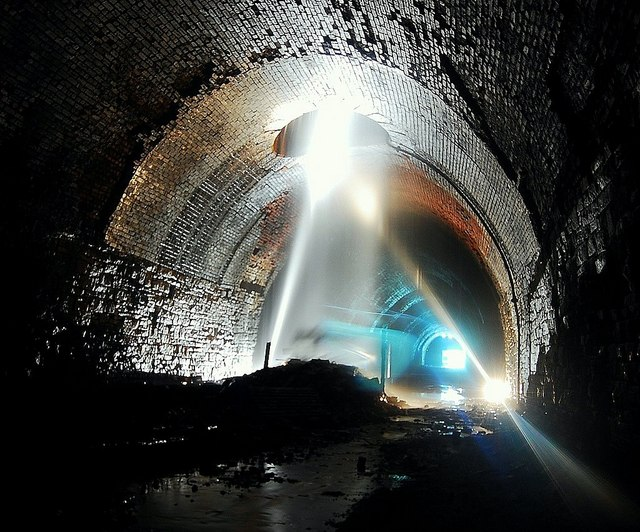
Queensbury tunnel

Construction of the line was much delayed; there was an act of Parliament of 12 August 1867, the Halifax and Ovenden Railway Act 1867 (30 & 31 Vict. c. clxxviii), permitting a doubling of the authorised capital, some deviations of the route, and an extension of time. Nevertheless, the depressed state of the money market meant that the scheme lay dormant until a further act of Parliament, the Halifax and Ovenden Junction Railway Act 1870 (33 & 34 Vict. c. cxli) was obtained on 1 August 1870, sanctioning a second extension of time, and vesting the undertaking jointly in the GNR and L&YR. The concern was then renamed the Halifax and Ovenden Joint Railway. Soon afterwards, construction began from a junction with the L&YR at the north end of Halifax station, for 2 miles 48 chains (4.18 km) to Holmfield. The steepest gradient was 1 in 45 and the sharpest curve was 11 chains (220 m) radius. A masonry viaduct carried the line through Halifax, with 35 spans which varied from 35 to 44 feet (11 to 13 m). A short distance beyond that, the line crossed another viaduct of 11 spans which varied from 20 to 35 feet (6 to 11 m). There were two tunnels, North Bridge (403 yards, 369 m) and Lee Bank (267 yards, 244 m). Earthworks were heavy, with high retaining walls. Goods depots were opened at North Bridge and Holmfield. The line opened for goods between Halifax and North Bridge on 17 August 1874, to Holmfield on 1 September 1874, and was opened to passengers throughout on 1 December 1879.

Lee Bank Tunnel was a railway tunnel on the Halifax to Queensbury section of the Queensbury lines south of Ovenden in Halifax, West Yorkshire, England. It was 267 yards (244 m) long and was very close to Woodside Viaduct and Woodside (Old Lane) Tunnel. The southern portal of Lee Bank tunnel was infilled when the main Keighley road was doubled to a dual carriageway, the northern portal was bricked up.

== Bradford and Thornton Railway ==
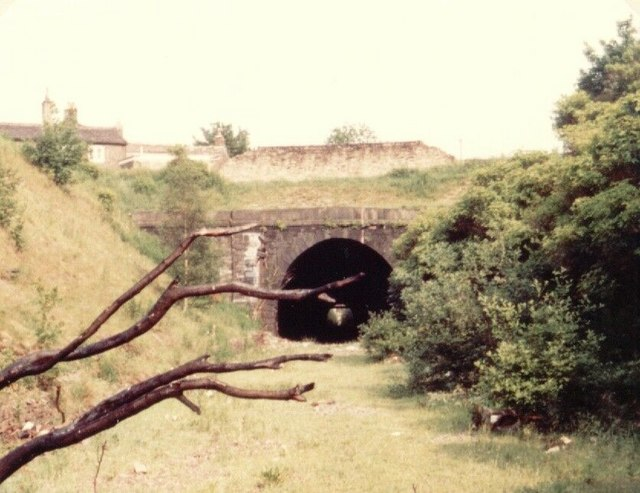
Disused tunnel on the City Road branch

Thornton, West Yorkshire was an important industrial centre, and in 1865 separate proposals were advanced by the L&YR and the GNR for lines to Thornton, but they were rejected by Parliament. During 1870 local businessmen put forward a scheme for a railway from Bradford to Thornton via Clayton and Queensbury; this would connect industrial locations hitherto not served by railways. The project had already been cut back in scope from an earlier project to reach Keighley, on the grounds that such a line would be unaffordable, due to the difficult terrain.

Bradford and Thornton Railways Act 1871
- Act of Parliament
- Parliament of the United Kingdom
- Long title: An Act to authorise the Construction of Railways in the neighbourhood of Bradford in Yorkshire, to be called "The Bradford and Thornton Railways."
- Citation: 34 & 35 Vict. c. clxix

Dates
- Royal assent: 24 July 1871

Text of statute as originally enacted

The GNR agreed to sponsor the reduced scheme and subscribe half the capital; the GNR was partly motivated by the belief that the rival Midland Railway would step in, getting access to Halifax, if the GNR held back. Accordingly, the Bradford and Thornton Railways Act 1871 (34 & 35 Vict. c. clxix) was passed on 24 July 1871, (Note: Grant refers to the company as the Bradford and Thornton Railways.) sponsored by the GNR, and the undertaking was transferred to and vested in the GNR by the Great Northern Railway (Various Powers) Act 1872 (35 & 36 Vict. c. cxxviii) of 18 July 1872. The authorised construction was 5 miles 49 chains (9.03 km) of line between St Dunstan's, Bradford, and Thornton. The junction at St Dunstan's was to be a triangle joining the existing GNR connecting line between Hammerton Street Junction and the Mill Lane Junction, approaching the L&YR Exchange station: this would allow direct running towards the L&YR station and also towards Laisterdyke and Leeds. (There were to be no platforms on this west-to-east side of the triangle.) In addition there was to be a short branch to Brick Lane, on the west side of Bradford, where a goods station was to be established, named City Road.

An important object of the Bradford and Thornton Railway was to provide railway facilities for Queensbury, home of the important Black Dyke Mills, run by John Foster. The town is at an altitude of 1,150 feet (351 m) above sea level. The weaving industry had flourished in this inhospitable location because of coal supplies in the immediate area; these were originally plentiful but there were now fears that the deposits were nearing the end of their life.

== Construction and opening: Bradford to Thornton ==
Work started in the Bradford to Thornton line on 21 March 1874. The earthworks were heavy, and construction was slow. The first section to be opened was from the St Dunstan's junctions at Bradford as far as Great Horton on 4 December 1876. The short branch line to City Road goods depot opened on the same day; both openings were for goods traffic only. The short extension to Clayton followed on 9 July 1877 or on 9 August 1877. The next stage was dependent on completion of Clayton Tunnel and Thornton Viaduct; opening for goods from Clayton to Thornton was on 1 May 1878. The line was opened throughout from Bradford to Thornton to all traffic on 14 October 1878.

Thornton Viaduct crossed the Pinch Beck valley. The viaduct is 300 yards (270 m) long and rises 120 feet (37 m) from the valley floor. It was built of brick and stone quarried locally and the central piers were sunk 25 feet (8 m) underground to the foundations. Each of its 20 arches are of 40 feet (12 m) span. It is still (2019) standing.

The initial passenger service was five trains each weekday from Bradford Exchange to Thornton and two from Laisterdyke, giving Leeds connections (and avoiding the use of the L&YR station). The opening of St Dunstan's station in January 1879 meant that Leeds connections were available there, and the Laisterdyke trains were soon taken off, while the Bradford service was increased.

Although the line passed through Queensbury, there was no station there at first; a temporary structure was built, to the east of the later East Junction on 14 April 1879. It had no goods facilities, and was reached only by a primitive and unmade footpath. The improved station, with platforms on all three curves of the triangular layout, opened later, on 1 January 1890.

== Halifax, Thornton and Keighley Railway ==
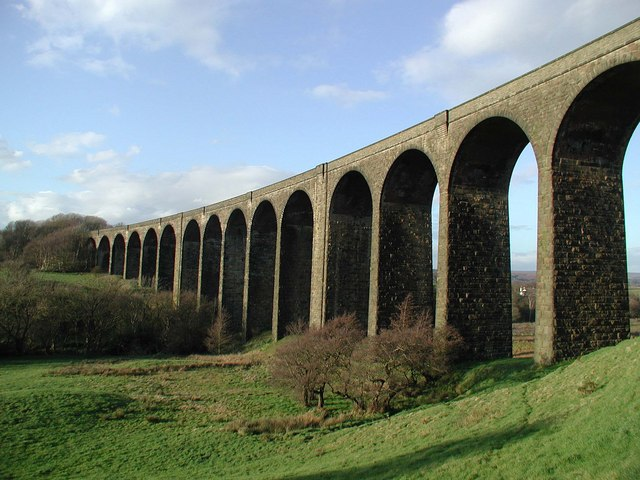
Hewenden Viaduct

In 1864 and again in 1867 moves were made independently (seeking Midland Railway support) for a rail link between Huddersfield, Halifax and Keighley, but these were unsuccessful. In 1872 another attempt was made, but the Midland Railway was implacable in refusing to assist. The GNR also rebuffed the promoters at first, and they decided to go it alone; however on 23 December 1872 agreement was reached. The GNR would not support a line from Halifax to Huddersfield, (which was now finally dead), but undertook to adopt the proposal as between Halifax and Keighley, if the independent supporters would find half the cost. The GNR's financial commitment was £640,000.

Great Northern (Halifax, Thornton, and Keighley Railways) Act 1873
- Act of Parliament
- Parliament of the United Kingdom
- Long title: An Act to authorise the construction by the Great Northern Railway Company of Railways in the West Riding of Yorkshire for connecting Keighley with Bradford and Halifax.
- Citation: 36 & 37 Vict. c. ccxx

Dates
- Royal assent: 5 August 1873

Text of statute as originally enacted

The Great Northern (Halifax, Thornton, and Keighley Railways) Act 1873 (36 & 37 Vict. c. ccxx) was passed on 5 August 1873. The route was to start from the almost-completed Halifax and Ovenden line at Holmfield, and join the Bradford and Thornton Railway at Queensbury, making a triangular junction there. It would then extend that line from Thornton on to Keighley. There was to be a separate terminus at Keighley near the Midland station, but this was later changed.

Between Queensbury and Holmfield the 1,033-yard-long (945 m) and 59-foot-deep (18 m) Strines cutting caused even greater difficulties with water-bearing strata than had the tunnel, and held up opening of this section to passengers until 1 December 1879.

== Construction and opening: Holmfield to Queensbury ==
Between Holmfield and Queensbury the 2 1/4-mile (3.6 km) line was almost entirely within Queensbury Tunnel or the massive Strines Cutting. Considerable trouble was encountered with water-bearing strata during construction. Goods trains started running on 14 October 1878, the same day that Thornton station opened to passengers.

In 1878 the GNR was in serious financial difficulty on capital account, and invited the Midland Railway to join in the Keighley line works, but the Midland refused.

Passenger trains began to run from Bradford to Halifax on 1 December 1879. Initially they ran nonstop after Queensbury but a temporary station was provided at Holmfield within a fortnight. North Bridge station opened on 25 March 1880, and Ovenden station in June 1881. The Halifax to Holmfield section remained in joint ownership with the Lancashire and Yorkshire Railway. Both companies ran goods trains but the GNR alone provided the passenger service.

Queensbury was not reached from Ovenden until late 1879, the line opening for goods traffic on 1 December and to passenger services two weeks later when temporary platforms at Holmfield were brought into use. Two temporary platforms at Queensbury had been in use for several months for Bradford-Thornton trains and completion of the long-awaited Halifax route gave the station a great deal of importance on account of its junction status. Initially, a daily service of six trains each way was provided between Bradford and Halifax.

Contractors started boring the 1 mi 741 yd (2,287 m) Queensbury Tunnel on 21 May 1874; this was to be the longest tunnel on the GNR until the opening of Ponsbourne Tunnel near Hertford in 1910. Four streets of temporary houses were built in Queensbury for the construction workers; although supposedly temporary, the buildings were not condemned until 1957. The tunnel work was completed on 31 July 1878.

== Construction and opening: Thornton to Keighley ==
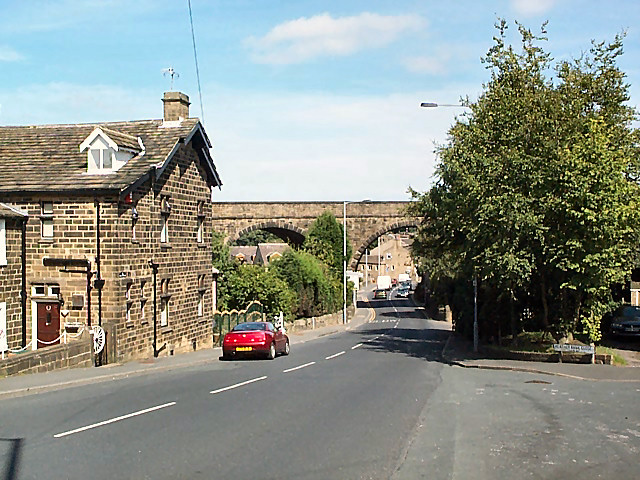
Cullingworth Viaduct

Work on the £282,000 Thornton to Keighley section was proving exceptionally difficult and progress was slow. The most serious problems were encountered on the stretch between Denholme and Wilsden where repeated landslips frustrated progress with construction. The intention had been for the line to pass through a series of cuttings, but the persistence of these earth slips forced the GNR to substitute two short tunnels.

Goods trains began running from Thornton to Denholme on a single track alignment from 1 September 1882, or 3 September. Passenger operation to Denholme started on 1 January 1884. The line was opened to Keighley goods depot on 1 April 1884, but the joint passenger station at Keighley was not ready. From 7 April 1884 GNR passenger trains were extended to Ingrow; the train service was eight trains a day. Finally, on 1 November 1884 passenger trains began running from Bradford and Halifax to Keighley Joint station. There were 18 GNR trains each weekday and four on Sundays. The station had cost £80,000, and in fact was not completed until the following spring.

== Keighley station ==
In 1880, the GNR applied for approval from Parliament to reduce its financial liability for the Thornton to Keighley line on which work was about to begin. It approached the Midland Railway with a proposal to make a joint station at Keighley, to be used by the Midland Railway main line trains, the Worth Valley line trains, and the GNR. The Midland Railway were amenable to this, and by an agreement of 1 June 1881, the Midland granted the GNR the necessary running powers, and agreed to make a new junction station. The agreement was in exchange for the Midland getting running powers to Halifax. The northernmost part of the Worth Valley branch was relaid and doubled; the agreement marked the start of a more amicable relationship between the GNR and the Midland. Powers for the new Keighley station and for the widening of the last part of the Worth Valley line were granted by the Midland Railway (Additional Powers) Act 1882 (45 & 46 Vict. c. cxxx). Although agreement had been reached about a shared station, goods facilities at Keighley were kept entirely separate: the GNR built a spur line off the Worth Valley route just outside Keighley station; the spur crossed under and entered its own goods yard.

== Queensbury station ==
The town of Queensbury was the most important on the route. However the high altitude of the town made it difficult for the railway to get close to it; the distance from the town to the station was one mile (1.6 km) downhill along an unsurfaced and unlit footpath; the difference in altitude was about 400 feet (120 m). When the line opened in 1878 there was no station at Queensbury until a temporary structure was hastily made ready for Easter 1879; it was located east of the East Junction. It had no goods facilities, no access for vehicles and the only footpath was unmade and unlit. There was repeated pressure from the Queensbury Local Board to improve the access, but the GNR delayed.

In 1885 a report was considered, which showed that it would be possible to construct a new station with platforms on all three sides of the triangular junction. Remarkably a railway connection to the town was considered: either a rope-worked incline at a gradient of 1 in 6, or a slightly more conventional locomotive-worked line, following a roundabout route. The latter would cost twice as much: it would be two miles (3.2 km) in length with a maximum gradient of 1 in 30. Work started on the new station in 1889 and a road to the town was included in the plans. The station opened on 1 January 1890 and the road came into use soon afterwards. The railway connection schemes were quietly forgotten.

== Train services ==
Queensbury station operated as an interchange point, making useful local connections. At certain times of the day trains stood on all three sides of the triangle allowing connections to be made in all directions. In 1910 there were 22 weekday departures from Bradford Exchange to Halifax or Keighley. In most cases the destination not served by a direct train could be reached by changing at Queensbury. There were 21 trains from Halifax for the Queensbury line and 16 starting from Keighley. On Sundays nine trains left Bradford Exchange for Halifax or Keighley. The journey from Bradford to Halifax by this route took between 35 and 40 minutes depending on the number of stops and the duration of the wait at Queensbury. This was slower than by the alternative Lancashire and Yorkshire Railway service, which was more frequent. A Great Northern train from Bradford to Keighley took 45 minutes, twice as long as the faster trains by the Midland Railway from Forster Square. Some traffic was lost to the electric tramways after the turn of the century. The Bradford trams began to eat into the traffic at stations as far as Thornton, whilst Ovenden, Holmfield and Queensbury became prey to the Halifax tramways. Because of the breaks of gauge, trams were not a threat on longer journeys in the West Riding, but when motor buses were operating in later years, the threat was considerable.

== Halifax High Level Railway ==
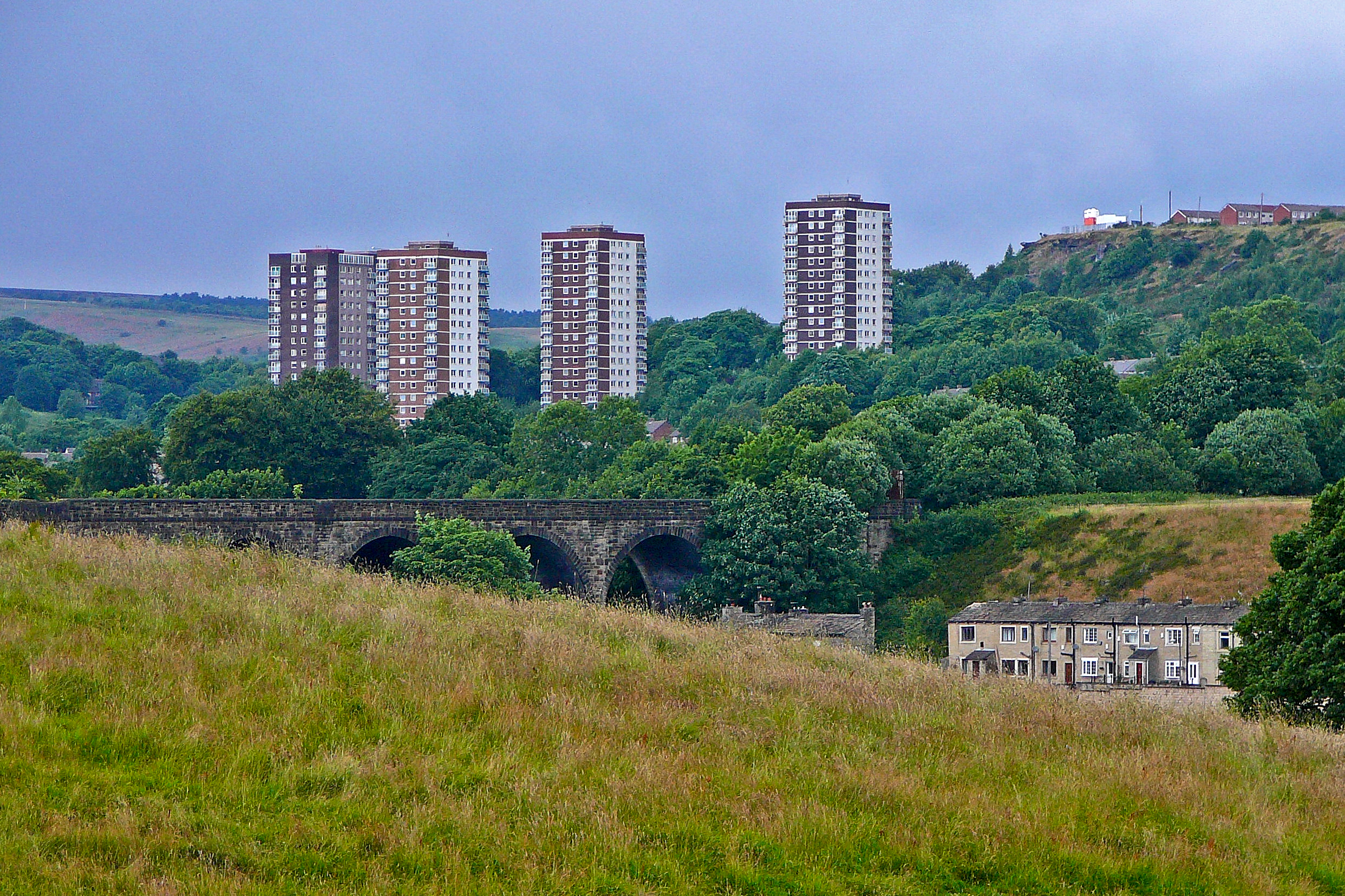
Tower blocks and the Wheatley viaduct

Halifax High Level and North and South Junction Railway Act 1884
- Act of Parliament
- Parliament of the United Kingdom
- Long title: An Act for incorporating the Halifax High Level and North and South Junction Railway Company and authorising them to make and maintain the Halifax High Level and North and South Junction Railway and for other purposes.
- Citation: 47 & 48 Vict. c. ccxlii

Dates
- Royal assent: 7 August 1884

Text of statute as originally enacted

Halifax High Level and North and South Junction Railway Act 1886
- Act of Parliament
- Parliament of the United Kingdom
- Long title: An Act for conferring further powers on the Halifax High Level and North and South Junction Railway Company in relation to their undertaking and for other purposes.
- Citation: 50 Vict. c. xliv

Dates
- Royal assent: 25 September 1886

Text of statute as originally enacted

Halifax High Level Railway Act 1892
- Act of Parliament
- Parliament of the United Kingdom
- Long title: An Act for conferring further powers on the Halifax High Level Railway Company in relation to their Undertaking and for other purposes.
- Citation: 55 & 56 Vict. c. ci

Dates
- Royal assent: 20 June 1892

In 1884 an ambitious plan was authorised, to make a north to south railway through Halifax connecting Holmfield to the planned Hull and Barnsley Railway at a Central Station in George Square, Halifax. In addition there would be a local branch to St Paul's, also in the high level part of Halifax. The Huddersfield part of the project was abandoned as too expensive, and the railway was authorised as the Halifax High Level and North and South Junction Railway by the Halifax High Level and North and South Junction Railway Act 1884 (47 & 48 Vict. c. ccxlii) on 7 August 1884. The Hull and Barnsley Railway was unable to complete its planned lines and by the Halifax High Level and North and South Junction Railway Act 1886 (50 Vict. c. xliv), the Halifax High Level Railway was reduced to the Holmfield to St Paul's section. Authorised capital was £360,000. The line would be worked jointly by the Lancashire and Yorkshire Railway and the Great Northern Railway, although the L&YR only ran goods trains on the route. The company was renamed the Halifax High Level Railway Company by the Halifax High Level Railway Act 1892 (55 & 56 Vict. c. ci).

The line opened for goods as far as Pellon on 1 August 1890 and to all traffic throughout on 5 September 1890. The timetable was generally arranged so that the High Level train arrived at Holmfield to change there for Bradford. In 1910 there were 11 departures from St Paul's Mondays to Fridays, 12 on Saturdays and five on Sundays. A steam railmotor was given a trial on the branch about 1906 but did not find favour, possibly because of the gradients.

The Halifax High Level Railway Company was absorbed jointly by the L&YR and GNR by the Great Northern Railway Act 1894 (57 & 58 Vict. c. lxxv) of 3 July 1894; a clause in the act obliged them to build a goods station at Wheatley. The branch was steeply graded and heavily engineered with an 810-yard (740 m) tunnel at Wheatley, approached at both ends by deep cuttings. There was a ten-arch viaduct across the Hebble Valley. St Paul's and Pellon Stations served a well-populated area of Halifax but the train service was of little value to anybody travelling south or west from Halifax. By 1898 electric trams had been introduced serving both St Paul's and Pellon. The High Level passenger service was temporarily closed at the end of 1916 because of the demand for manpower in the war effort. In fact the passenger service never resumed, though there were occasional excursions during the 1920s and 1930s. The track was singled and most of the signalling removed. The main value of the High Level line was for freight. St Paul's was at an altitude about 325 feet (99 m) higher than the Old Station, and the slow and roundabout route was not significant to goods traffic; there were numerous mills and factories in the upper part of Halifax, and goods traffic continued until 27 June 1960.

== Queensbury tunnel problem ==
Defects were discovered in the sidewalls of Queensbury tunnel, and urgent repairs were carried out from January to September 1883. Single-line working through the tunnel was instituted to enable the work to proceed. Normal working was able to resume on 9 September 1883 and no further problems were encountered.

== Decline and closure ==
Sunday trains were withdrawn in December 1938, but otherwise the timetable showed a continuing good service. In 1950 the timetable was recast to give a better peak-hour service to and from Bradford but with fewer off-peak trains and a reduction in direct trains between Halifax and Keighley. St Dunstan's and Horton Park stations closed in September 1952, and less than three years later, the entire passenger service was withdrawn. In May 1956 the sections between Queensbury and Holmfield and between Cullingworth and Ingrow were closed to all traffic. This saved the cost of maintaining Queensbury and Lees Moor Tunnels and divided the route into three separate branch lines which were then operated with reduced signalling. The remaining operation was progressively cut back over the next 18 years. Holmfield and the High Level closed in 1960, Cullingworth in 1963, Thornton and Ingrow in 1965. The last remnants were from St Dunstan's to Horton Park and City Road which survived until 1972. City Road had been reduced to a coal depot on 5 June 1967. Halifax to North Bridge coal yard closed in 1974. The Hewenden and Cullingworth Viaducts survive.

Close to £1 million had been spent on building the Queensbury lines, and it is doubtful if the expenditure was ever really justified. Advantages of the Bradford–Halifax section were to a considerable extent nullified by the 1882 GNR–L&YR agreement, while the Bradford–Keighley route was too steeply graded to compete with the Midland's low-lying line along the Aire Valley. At first the GNR provided the fastest service from Keighley to London in 4 hours 55 minutes by a Keighley–Bradford train, stopping only at St Dunstan's to connect with a King's Cross express. A service from Halifax avoided St Dunstan's by using the Leeds curve to connect with London trains at Laisterdyke. After a brief heyday the routes settled down to concentrate on purely local traffic, and even this diminished when trams started running from both Bradford and Halifax to Queensbury in 1901. Buses caused a further reduction in traffic in the late 1920s and Sunday trains were withdrawn in December 1938, but by 1946 the service was still surprisingly lavish with one through coach working to King's Cross, running from Halifax to Bradford in 22 minutes. It was only after a survey showed the line was losing £48,000 a year that regular passenger trains were withdrawn on 23 May 1955. All lines west of Horton Park were completely closed by 1965, and those east of this point followed suit in 1972. Queensbury and Lees Moor tunnels were abandoned in 1956 owing to their poor state of repair.

The line was cut back to Thornton on 11 November 1963 and the entire section west of Horton Junction closed from 28 June 1965. Horton Park Yard and the City Road branch survived until August 1972.

The short section between Halifax and North Bridge closed on 1 April 1974 and the long viaduct linking the two was controversially demolished in 1980.

== Since closure ==
The line between St Dunstan's and Queensbury has been all but obliterated by infilling and permitted development but that can hardly be said of the routes between Halifax and Queensbury and (particularly) between Queensbury and Keighley, on which a number of structures and the basic integrity of the route remain and are maintained. The viaducts at Thornton and Hewenden are now listed structures and sections of the Queensbury to Keighley line are already back in use for walking and cycling. A campaign to rescue Queensbury tunnel and extend the new network to Halifax through the tunnel has gathered support such that the tunnel's precise fate now remains to be seen. A route bypassing Clayton tunnel to link the walking and cycling facility with a route into Bradford has been identified and much of the remaining route to Keighley has also been studied so that plans can be developed. A development blocking the High Level route between Holmfield and Wheatley tunnel would seem to have ended any prospect of using that former railway at the present time.

== Stations ==
=== Bradford to Keighley ===
- St Dunstan's; opened 21 November 1878; closed 15 September 1952;
- Manchester Road; opened 14 October 1878; closed 1 January 1916;
- Horton Park; opened 23 October 1880; closed 15 September 1952; later cricket and football specials;
- Great Horton; opened 14 October 1878; closed 23 May 1955;
- Clayton; opened 14 October 1878; closed 23 May 1955;
- Clayton Tunnel;
- Queensbury; opened 14 April 1879; improved station opened 1 January 1890; closed 23 May 1955;
- Thornton Viaduct;
- Thornton; opened 14 October 1878; closed 23 May 1955;
- Well Head Tunnel;
- Denholme; opened 1 January 1884; closed 23 May 1955;
- Wilsden; opened 1 July 1886; closed 23 May 1955;
- Hewenden Viaduct;
- Cullingworth Viaduct;
- Cullingworth; opened 7 April 1884; closed 23 May 1955;
- Lees Moor Tunnel;
- Ingrow; opened 7 April 1884; renamed Ingrow East 1951; closed 23 May 1955;
- Keighley; joint station opened 6 May 1883, replacing earlier Midland Railway station; still open.

=== Halifax to Queensbury ===
- Halifax; opened 1 July 1844; 7 August 1850 and 24 June 1855; still open;
- North Bridge; opened 25 March 1880; closed 23 May 1955;
- Old Lane Tunnel;
- Lee Bank Tunnel;
- Ovenden; opened 2 June 1881; closed 23 May 1955;
- Holmfield; opened 15 December 1879; closed 23 May 1955;
- Queensbury Tunnel;
- Queensbury; (above).

=== St Paul's Branch ===
- St Paul's; opened 5 September 1890; closed 1 January 1917;
- Pellon; opened 5 September 1890; closed 1 January 1917;
- Wheatley goods;
- Wheatley Viaduct;
- Wheatley Tunnel;
- Holmfield; above.

== Sources ==
- Awdry, Christopher, Encyclopedia of British Railway Companies, Patrick Stephens Limited, Wellingborough, 1990, ISBN 1-85260-049-7
- Bairstow, Martin, The Queensbury Lines, published by Martin Bairstow, Leeds, 2015, ISBN 978 1 871944 44 0
- Carter, Ernest F, An Historical Geography of the Railways of the British Isles, Cassell, London, 1959
- Grant, Donald J, Directory of the Railway Companies of Great Britain, Matador Publishers, Kibworth Beauchamp, 2017, ISBN 978 1785893 537
- Joy, David (1984) [1975]. South and West Yorkshire. A Regional History of the Railways of Great Britain. Vol. 8 (2nd ed.). Newton Abbot: David & Charles. ISBN 0-946537-11-9.
- Marshall, John, The Lancashire & Yorkshire Railway, volume 1, David & Charles, Newton Abbot, 1969, ISBN 0-7153-4352-1
- Quick, Michael, Railway Passenger Stations in England, Scotland and Wales: A Chronology, the Railway and Canal Historical Society, Richmond, Surrey, 2002
- Whitaker, Alan & Cryer, Bob (1984). The Queensbury Lines. Dalesman Books. ISBN 0-85206-807-7.
- Wrottesley, John, The Great Northern Railway: volume I: Origins and Development, B T Batsford Limited, London, 1979, ISBN 0 7134 1590 8
- Wrottesley, John, The Great Northern Railway: volume II: Expansion and Competition, B T Batsford Limited, London, 1979, ISBN 0 7134 1592 4
