= Hebble Brook =

River in West Yorkshire, England

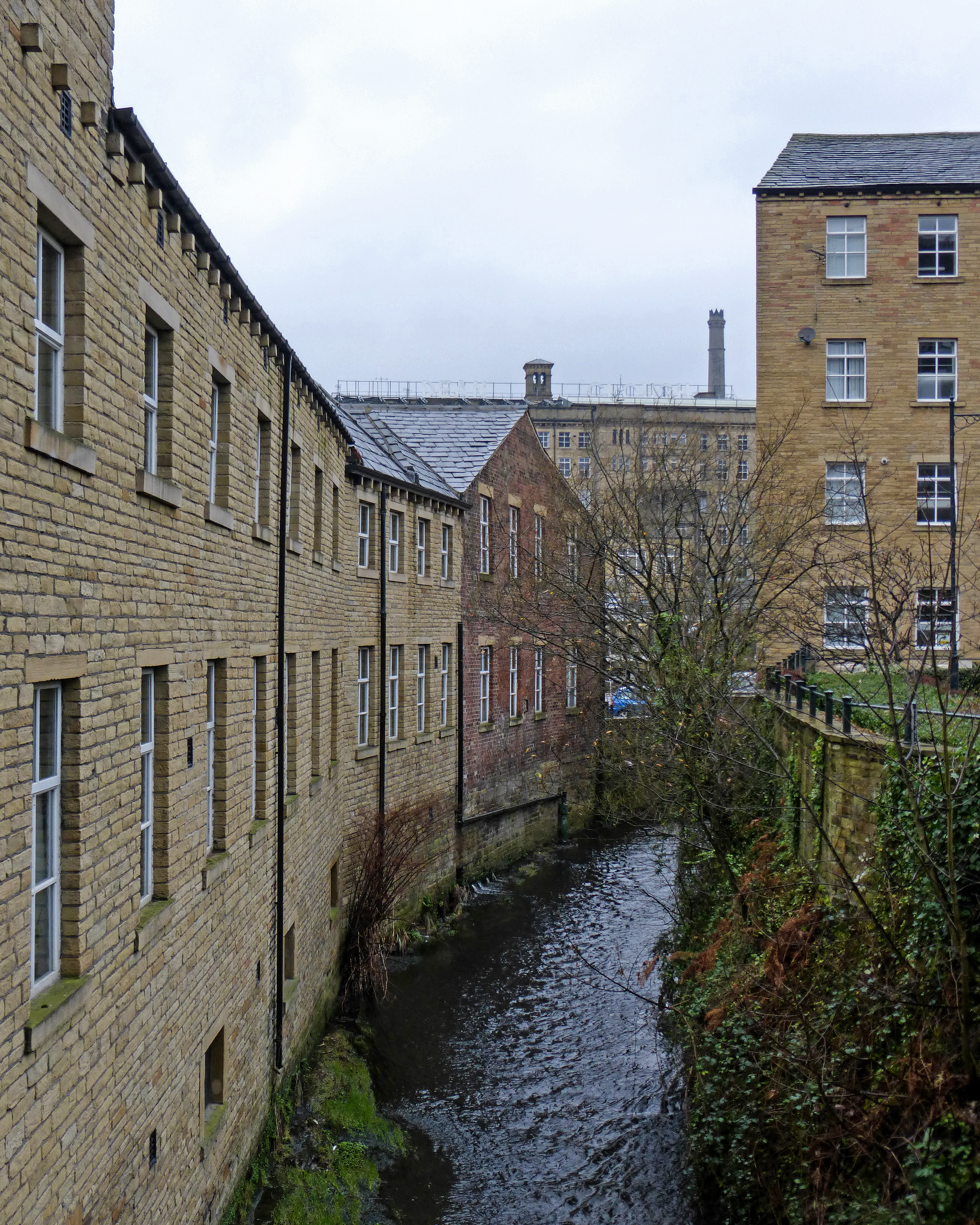
- Hebble Brook at Dean Clough, Halifax

Location
- Country: England
- State: West Yorkshire
- Region: Calderdale

Physical characteristics
- Source: Ogden Water
  - coordinates: 53°46′19.7″N 1°54′06.6″W
  - elevation: 250 m (820 ft)
- Mouth
  - location: Salterhebble
  - coordinates: 53°41′47.2″N 1°51′24.5″W
  - elevation: 60 m (200 ft)
- Basin size: 34.76 km^{2} (13.42 sq mi)

Basin features
- River system: River Calder, West Yorkshire

Hebble Brook is a river passing south from Ogden Reservoir, at Ogden, through Halifax and empties into the River Calder at Salterhebble.

== Toponymy ==
The name Hebble is a back formation from the local dialect word for a narrow, short planked bridge.

== Ogden Water ==
The reservoir itself (known as Ogden Water) is sourced from water draining off Skirden Edge, through Skirden Clough, to the west and from the north the reservoir takes in water from Deep Gulf and Spa Flat, above the now disused Fly Delph Quarry, through the Great Scar and Ogden Clough. The reservoir is 62 feet (19 m) deep, holds 35,000,000 cubic feet (1,000,000 m^{3}) of water and was completed in 1858 to supply fresh water to Halifax. The water is surrounded by 24 hectares (60 acres) of mixed conifer and broad leafed nature reserve that attracts 300,000 visitors a year. The construction of the reservoir was started in 1854. The scheme employed 500 men. It was finished in 1858. It can supply Halifax with water by gravity alone.

== Course ==
The Middle Grain Beck and Carrs Beck flow into Hebble Brook, from the land around Halifax golf course, at Brookhouse, just south of Ogden Reservoir; it then continues south past Mixenden, where various small springs and old quarry workings add to the water volume. The brook heads south past Ovenden and Wheatley and flows underground in Brackenbed Sports Park. Thereafter it flows under and above ground intermittently (picking up Ovenden Brook in the Lee Bridge area) until it reaches Sedburgh Road in Halifax. It then flows in the open parallel to the Halifax Branch of the Calder and Hebble Navigation before flowing into the River Calder.

The Hebble gives its name to nearby village Salterhebble, where the river flows through. There was a pub located in Salterhebble named the Calder and Hebble, after the two local rivers.

== Geology ==
Mapping indicates that the watercourse starts at the outflow point of Ogden Water. The Environment Agency list the brook as starting at the Ogden wind farm on Nab Hill some 2.5 kilometres (1.6 mi) west of Ogden Water. The water is shown as flowing through Ogden Clough, a narrow valley of mudstones and sandstones with many small waterfalls as it easily erodes the mudstone, but not the sandstone.

== See also ==
- Rivers of the United Kingdom
