= Harden Moor =

Moorland in West Yorkshire, England

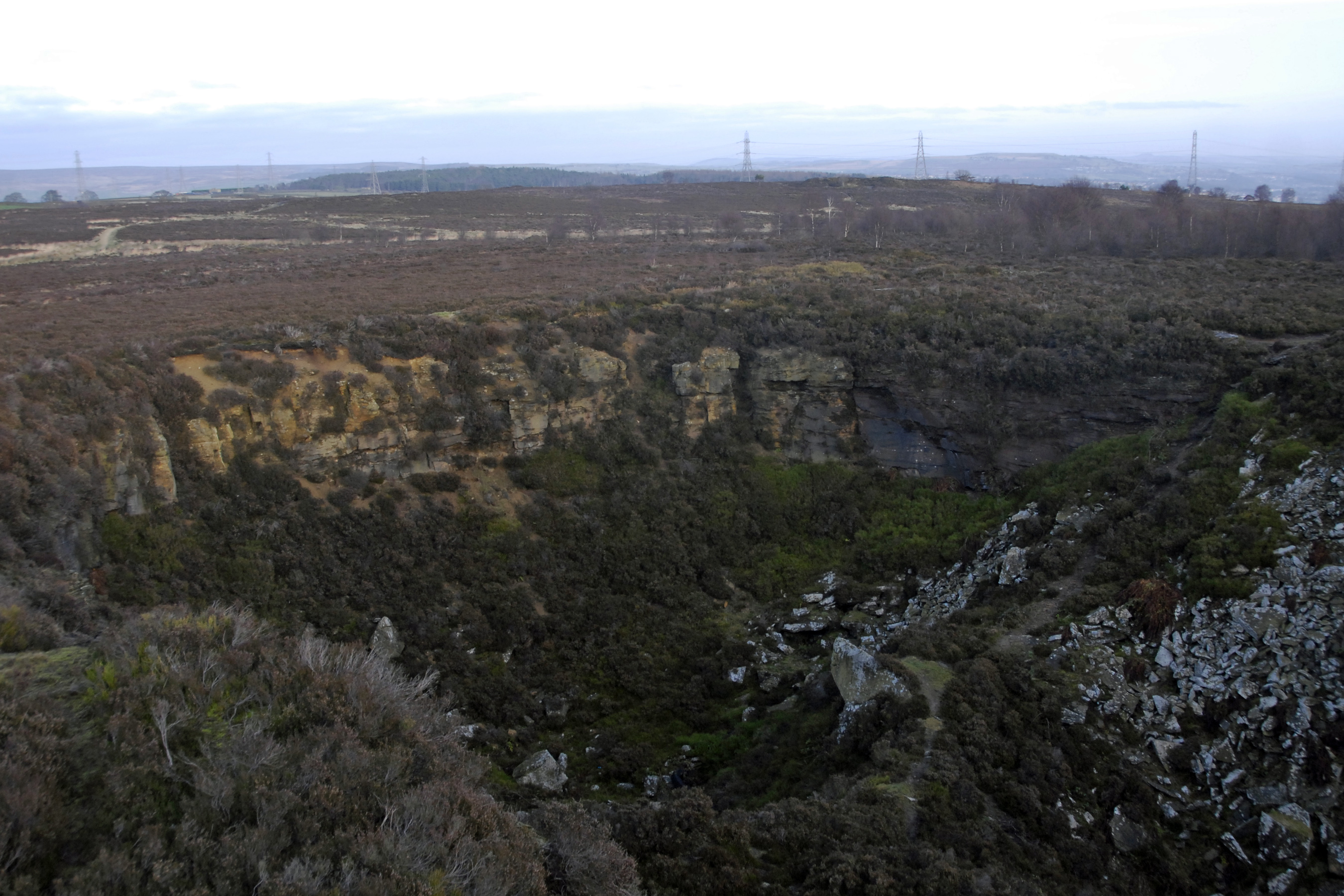
- Harden Moor looking eastwards towards Airedale with a former quarry in the foreground

Highest point
- Elevation: 285 m (935 ft)

Dimensions
- Area: 228 acres (92 ha)

Geography
- Location: West Yorkshire, United Kingdom
- OS grid: SE075390
- Topo map: OS Landranger 104

Harden Moor is an expanse of moorland that lies north of the village of Harden in West Yorkshire, England. The moor encompasses stretches of heather, woodland and former quarry workings and is bordered by Airedale to the east, the Worth Valley to the north and Catstones Moor and the village of Cullingworth to the west. Historically, Harden Moor occupied the high ground between Bingley, Keighley, Cullingworth and Harden. Altar Lane, an unmade road which runs from the Brown Cow Inn in Bingley to Keighley Road on Harden Moor is an unofficial border between the estate of St Ives and Harden Moor, but when the St Ives Estate was created, a large swathe of Harden Moor was taken over.

The moorland has a varied history, with a Roman Road, industrial workings and modern day leisure activities.

== History ==
Before the St Ives estate was formed, Harden Moor stretched from Bingley in the east to Cullingworth in the west. In 13th century deeds, Ellar Carr Beck (which drains down from Lees Moor and skirts the northern edge of Cullingworth) was defined as the western edge of Harden. This area included Catstones Moor and north up to Hainworth Shaw. Opinions vary as to what the boundaries of Harden Moor are; 18th and 19th century texts describe Harden Moor as including Altar Rock (Druid's Altar) and the land surrounding. In modern archaeological data, Adrian Chadwick describes Catstones Ring on Catstones Moor as being on the southwestern edge of Harden Moor.

The history of Harden Moor goes back to the Bronze Age and this is evidenced by the cairns on the moor that have been listed with Historic England. The cairns, which can date from anywhere between 2000-700BC, are examples of Bronze Age burial mounds. These cairns and the ring on Catstones Moor were listed by English Heritage in 2010 as being at risk of falling into decay.

The Brigantes, who occupied the territory before the Roman invasion, used a gritstone outcrop that overlooks Bingley as an altar in what is believed to be a form of Druidism. Cup and ringlet marks have been found carved in Altar Rock (also popularly known as Druid's Altar). There is a Roman Road which crosses Harden Moor on a south west/north east axis. This road originated in Manchester (Mamucium) and continued north to Ilkley going through Riddlesden, Morton Banks and Rombalds Moor to what was the Roman encampment known as Olicana. A second Roman road passed through Harden village and crossed Harden Beck by the Malt Shovel inn. It then went in a north westerly direction passing near to the hamlet of Ryecroft and crossing the moor near to Ryecroft Road. Remains of this road can still be seen on the stretch of moorland that is near to the Guide Inn public house. The Malt Shovel Inn in Harden village was also the place where travelling judges would pass sentences on criminals. Those who received the death penalty were hung on Harden Moor.

Fairfax Entrenchment, a curved trench believed to have been the site of a skirmish between the two warring sides in the English Civil War, was on Harden Moor. Although there is no known documentary evidence of a fight, it is known that Thomas Fairfax stayed at Harden Grange and most likely he ordered a trench to be dug as a defensive measure. The site is now part of the St Ives estate which has also been converted partly into a golf course. At the time of the supposed skirmish, the site was part of Harden Moor and the area was left undeveloped by the Ferrand family (the local landowners) in deference to the rumour that bodies of fallen civil war soldiers were buried there. Large scale mapping indicates the shape and curve of the trench with the soldiers graves being behind the northern curve of the trench and just south of Altar Lane.

Due to finds of coins and other artifacts, it is believed that the Jacobite army of 1745 passed over Harden Moor in November of that year en route to Preston. The moorland was enclosed in stages from 1816 with full enclosure being completed in 1855. In the maps of the Enclosure Act in Airedale, Harden Moor is listed as the section between Bingley and Hainworth Shaw (a hamlet just to the north of present-day Harden Moor).

As with other neighbouring moorlands, Harden Moor was used for military training during the Second World War. Empty shell casings and tail fins from mortar rounds have been found scattered across these moors. On the St Ives Estate is an old hut where the Home Guard used to meet up and were called out to search for enemy parachutists dropping down onto Harden Moor (though there is no documentary evidence that anyone did actually parachute onto Harden Moor). In 1945, four Keighley teenagers were walking across the moor when one of them found a mortar and without realising it was live, threw the mortar against a wall. An explosion followed and all suffered injuries (three of them seriously) and they were taken to Bradford Royal Infirmary for treatment. A further three explosions of unattended ordnance followed during the summer of 1945, and one of which resulted in the death of 13 year old Frank Charles Smith (of Keighley). This prompted Bingley Urban District Council, who owned the moor at the time, to initiate a burn policy across parts of the moor to allow mine detectors to be used in the search for unexploded ordnance.

Quarrying has been prominent on the western edge of what is now Harden Moor adjacent to Ryecroft Road for over 300 years, with many of the quarrymen residing in the nearby hamlet of Ryecroft. The sandstone from these quarries (Yeadonian, which is rough rock and rough rock flags) was used to construct the iconic buildings in Saltaire and other local towns and villages. The last operational quarry was Midgeham Cliff End Quarry which was satisfying a demand for a type of sandstone (known as blockstone) that is used in locally constructed housing. The quarry had ceased activity by 2012, but was granted a licence to recycle construction and demolition waste. However, the site must be safe and fully restored by 2022.

=== Altar Rock ===
Altar Rock (also known as Druid's Altar) is a sandstone outcrop that juts out above the western edge of Airedale and overlooks Morton, Crossflatts, Bingley and Keighley with wide panoramic views up and down the Aire Valley. The rock is mentioned in Disraeli's novel Sybil. Disraeli had visited the rock in 1844 when he was staying with his friend William Ferrand, who was the then owner of the St Ives Estate which borders Altar Lane to the south. Disraeli had been greatly influenced by Altar Rock and in Sybil, he had a meeting of Chartists at a rocky outcrop in his fictional setting. This may have had some basis in fact as Chartist rallies were being held around this time in the Aire Valley, with one meeting being reported on Harden Moor. A body of men was organised to go onto the moor and disperse the meeting only to find that it was a meeting of Methodists.

Traditionally, the site of Altar Rock has been on Harden Moor, although it is now part of the St Ives Estate despite Altar Lane, which stretches between Ireland Bridge in Bingley and Aire View Farm on the Harden to Keighley Road, being a natural boundary to the northern edge of the St Ives Estate. Older sources describe Altar Rock as being part of Harden Moor, and even as recently as 1995, when a murdered 15-year-old girl was found at Altar Rock, it was described as being on Harden Moor. The 15-year-old girl in question was Nobantu Zani (also known as Mandy) who had emigrated to Bradford from South Africa with her mother and two brothers after her father was killed. Zani's mother believed her to be staying with friends and she may have been missing for up to three weeks before her body was found strangled with her own chiffon scarf.

It was later revealed that she had been living a double life and had not attended school for some time, and when she had attended, the time spent there was sporadic. A school truancy councillor was due to call at her mother's house but on the day of the appointment had called in sick. Zani's mother was unaware of this meeting as due to the nature of truancy, it was intended as a surprise. A December 2015 Freedom of Information request showed that Zani's death was classified as undetected by West Yorkshire Police. An inquest into her death in 1999 returned an Open Verdict as decomposition prevented an established cause of death.

== Ecology ==
The site is typical of a South Pennine Moorland with gritstone and sandstone (Millstone Grit Yeadonian sandstone outcrops) underlying the soil. The moor has several springs and marshes and in its central section is drained by two streams (Deep Cliff Hole and Midgram Beck) which both flow through Harden (meeting up under the houses built on the former mill site in the village) and flowing through Harden park to meet up with Harden Beck in the Woodbanks area at the eastern end of the village. Deepcliffe Wood is a small valley that is bordered on its northern, western and eastern edges by heather moorland. The wood, through which Deep Cliff Hole drains, is a remnant of an ancient woodland which sits on a fault extending southwards towards Wilsden and is noted for its oak trees, badgers, woodpeckers, bats and cuckoos.

The heather on Harden Moor is noted to be free of disease and parasites and so has been used to re-seed other moorland habitats in Yorkshire when they have been at risk. Ilkley Moor was re-seeded by cuttings and seedlings from Harden Moor in 2006 after a significant moorland fire. The heather ling and brambles on Harden Moor are also a haven for the tormentil mining bee. The bee's population has decreased rapidly and the Yorkshire and Humber area is noted as having an 'important population' of the bees that excavate burrows to live in.

== Leisure activities ==
The whole of Harden Moor is designated as common land and besides being used for walking and horse riding, the moorland is also used by motorbikers and push-bikers for trials and competitions. The former quarry workings provide a good backdrop for testing courses for the riders. The moor is also a popular location to go orienteering, with events held regularly by local orienteering clubs. When the Ferrand family still owned the St Ives Estate, they used Harden Moor for hunting with dogs and invited along friends and aristocracy.

Motorised model aircraft flying is also permitted on the northern edge of the moor, where a strip of grassed land is provided to enable modellers to safely take off and land their aircraft. Flying of model aircraft on the moor has been in existence since at least 1935.

There are panoramic views from Harden Moor northwards and eastwards over Airedale, westwards towards the moors above Cullingworth and Denholme and southwards towards the hills above Wilsden. A Trig Point was located at the highest point on the moor just west of the moor across Ryecroft Road on Catstones Moor. This stands at 292 metres (959 ft) high.

== Access ==
Being an open country parkland, Harden Moor is accessible all year round. It has a bridleway that runs along the northern edge of the moor, which also crosses Keighley Road at the eastern end of the moor and runs into Altar Lane. This then goes past Druid's Altar and takes the walker or mountain biker down to Bingley along the northern edge of St Ives Estate. Part of the bridleway crosses into St Ives further south as part of the Keighley leg of the Calder/Aire footpath. Harden Moor is bounded on the west and east by local unclassified roads which have car parks or parking available. The moor is accessible on foot via Hainworth Shaw from the north, St Ives Estate in the east and on pathways from the south through Ryecroft and Harden. The moor is part of the Bradford Pennine Gateway national nature reserve, which was created in 2025.

== Gallery ==
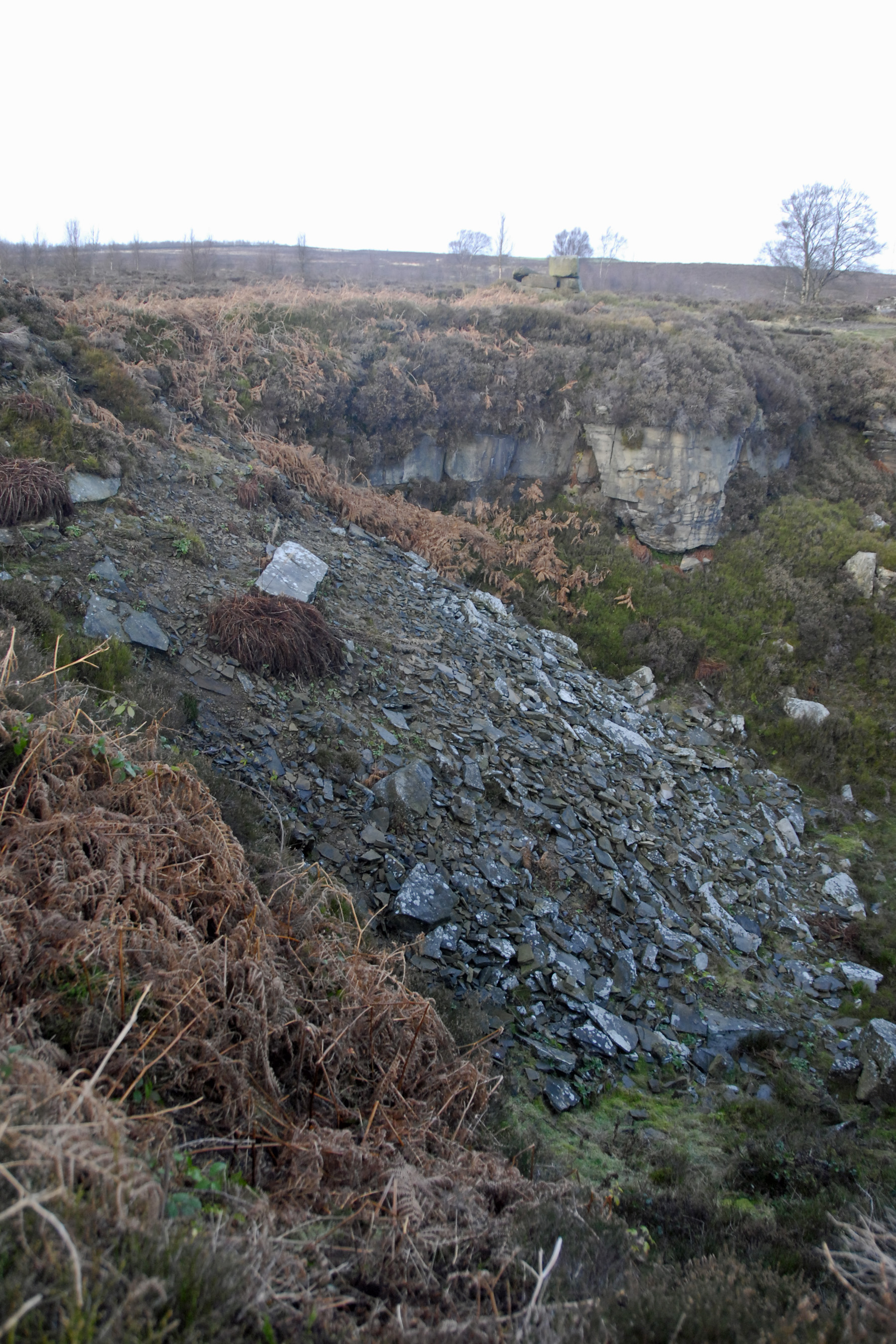
Former quarry workings on Harden Moor near Keighley in West Yorkshire

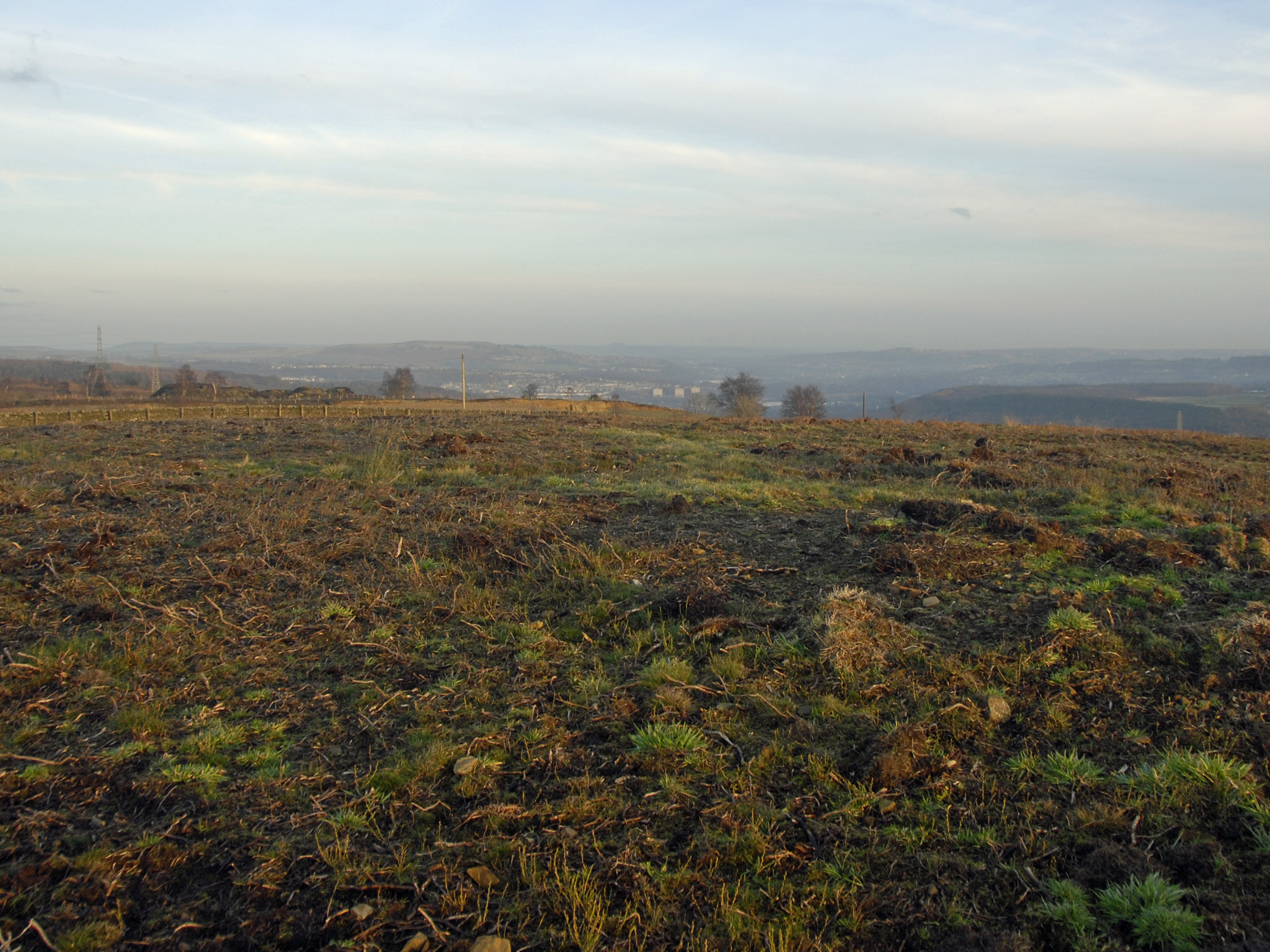
Former Trig Point site on Catstones Moor near to Keighley in West Yorkshire

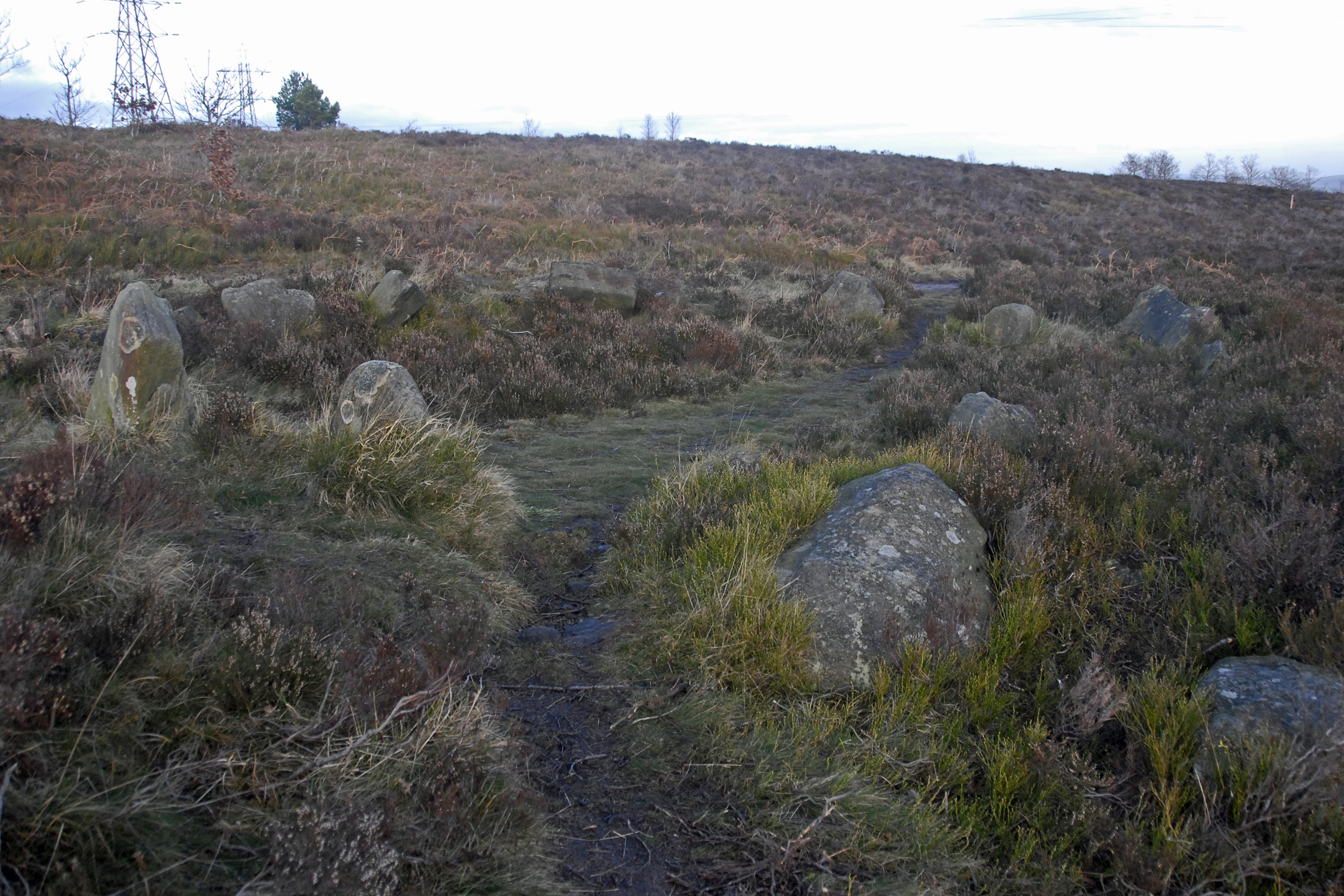
Bronze Age Cairn on Harden Moor near to Keighley in West Yorkshire

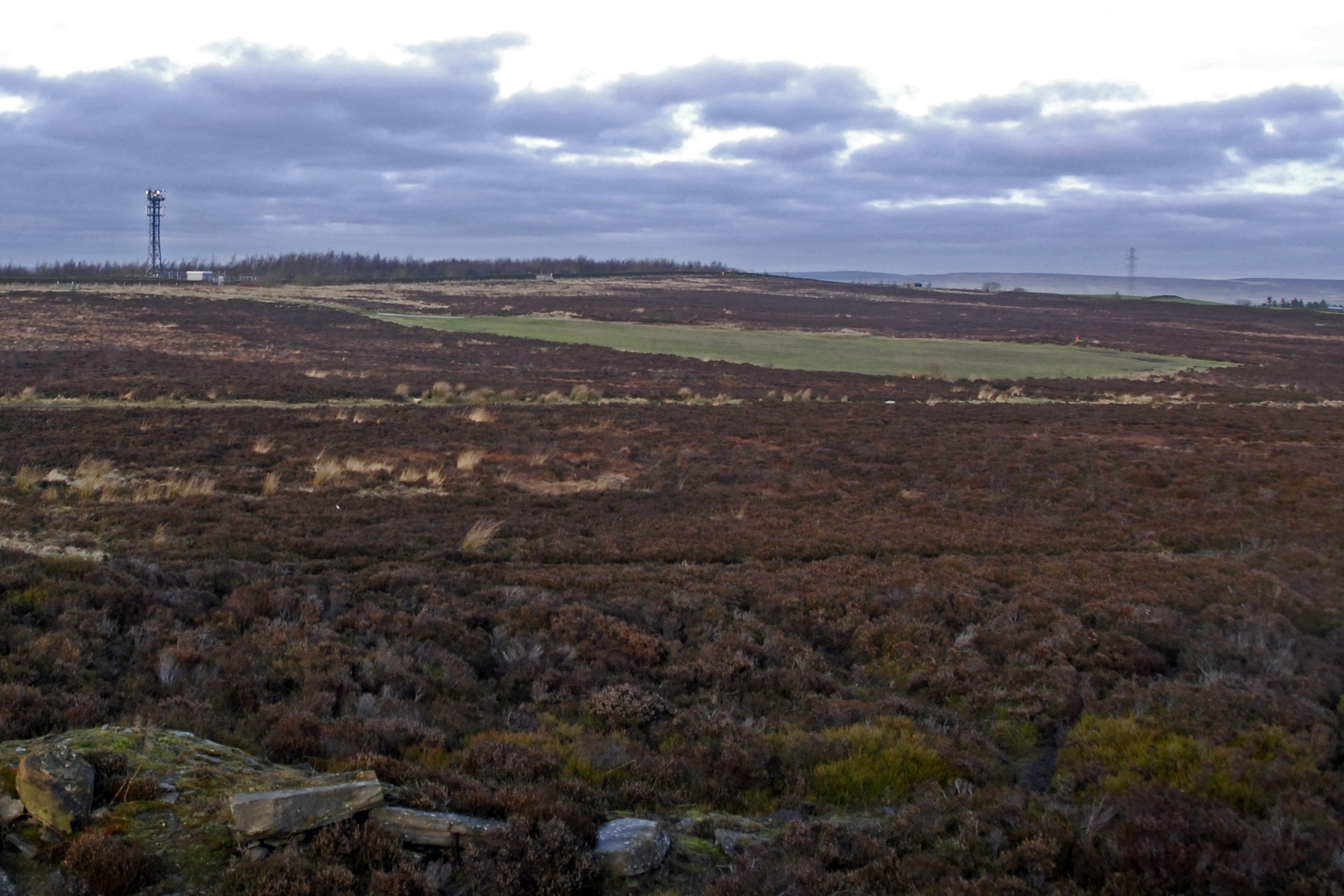
Take off and landing area for motorised model aircraft on Harden Moor near to Keighley in West Yorkshire

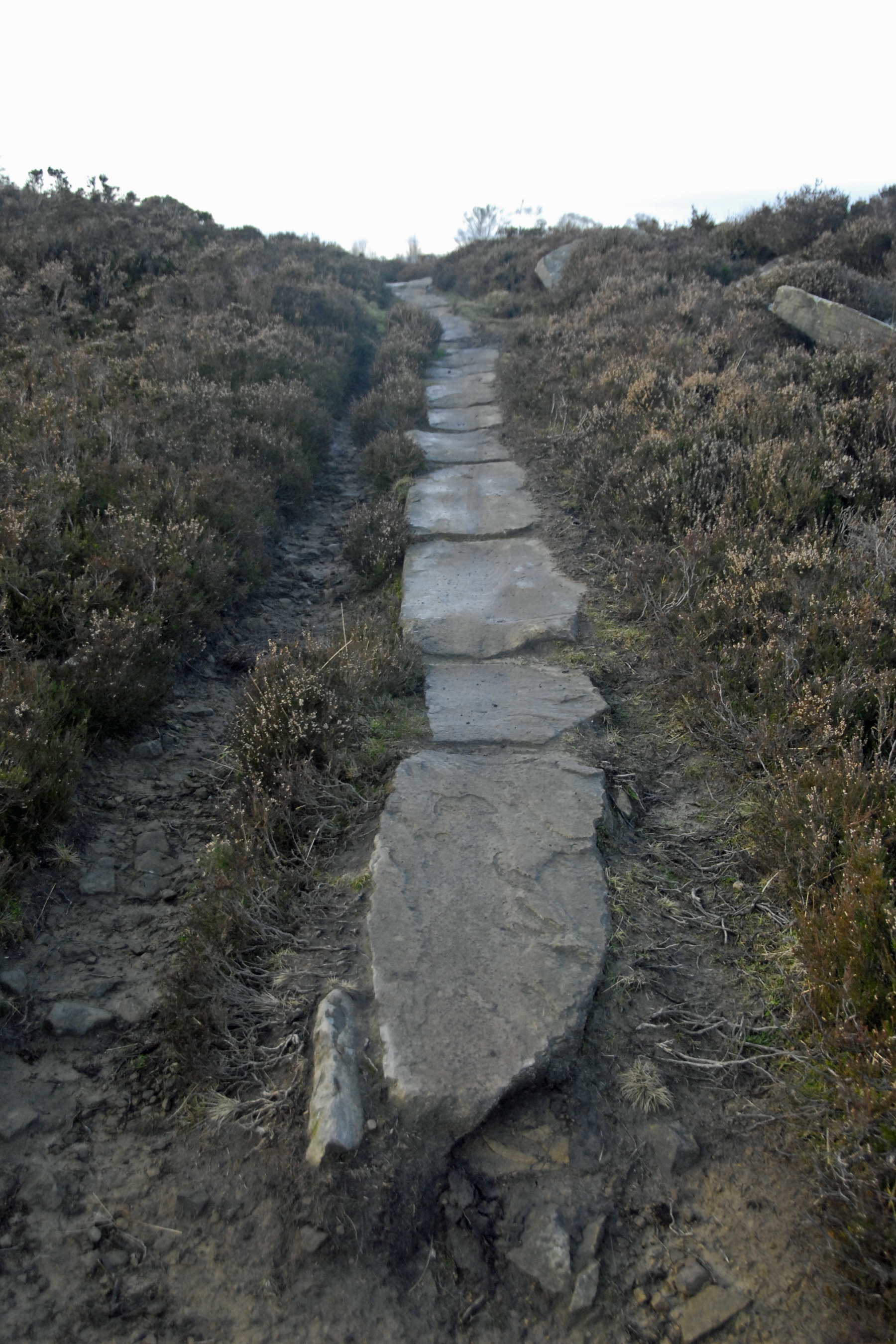
Roman road on Harden Moor in Keighley, West Yorkshire
