= Hainworth =

Hamlet in West Yorkshire, England

Coordinates: 53.8483°N 1.9105°W

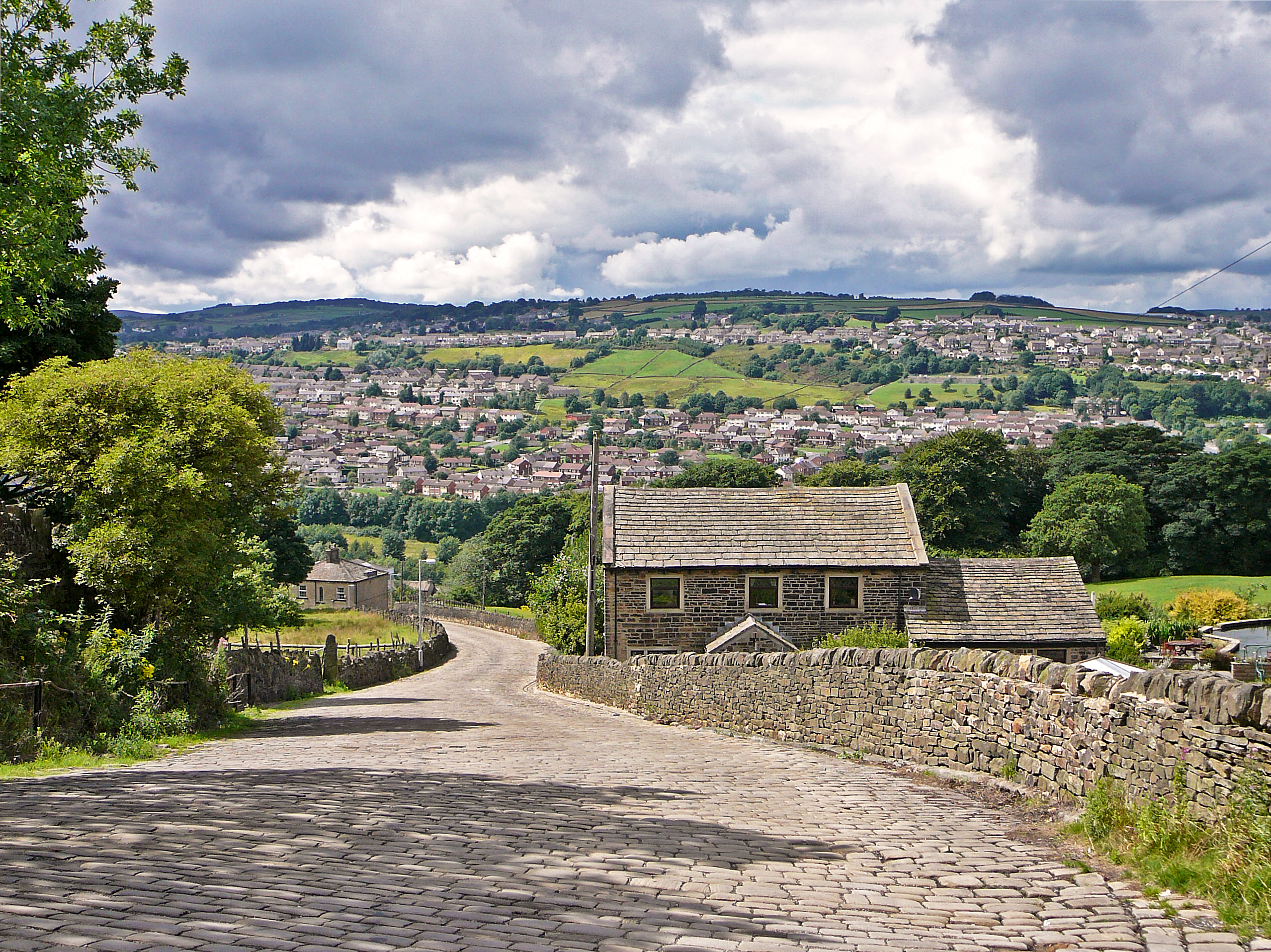
- Hainworth Lane, looking westwards across the Worth Valley

- Location within West Yorkshire
- OS grid reference: SE051391
- Civil parish: Keighley
- Metropolitan borough: City of Bradford
- Metropolitan county: West Yorkshire
- Region: Yorkshire and the Humber
- Country: England
- Sovereign state: United Kingdom
- Post town: KEIGHLEY
- Postcode district: BD21
- Dialling code: 01535
- Police: West Yorkshire
- Fire: West Yorkshire
- Ambulance: Yorkshire
- UK Parliament: Keighley and Ilkley

Hainworth is a hamlet 1 mile (2 km) south of Keighley in West Yorkshire, England. The hamlet faces north across the lower end of the Worth Valley with a steep wooded incline towards Keighley.

== History ==
Hainworth is mentioned in the Domesday Book as Hageneuuorde which derives from Old English, meaning the place of Hagena's people. There is a belief that native Britons lived there before the Ango-Saxon invasion, and inhabited it afterwards when the Anglo-Saxon presence pushed the natives into the hills around the Aire Valley, just as at Wilsden and Cullingworth. Even further back, it was close to a Roman road on its eastern side, which linked Manchester with Ilkley (Olicana).

The road just past Hainworth became the main thoroughfare that was used between Keighley and Halifax (via Cullingworth), and allowed for the growth of the cloth and wool industries in the hamlet, as it connected to the Piece Hall in Halifax. Those who lived in Hainworth were employed mostly in agriculture and the worsted industries until the Industrial Revolution prompted many mills to be built in the Worth Valley as Hainworth did not have access to fast flowing water for power. The proximity of mills to the River Worth led to the Keighley to Halifax Turnpike being built in 1752, away from Hainworth on the floor of the Worth Valley. However, much of the cloth made in the valley was still woven in Hainworth, which necessitated the construction of Hainworth Lane down to Ingrow. As Hainworth Lane is built on a steep gradient, it needed to be wide and have a good surface, so it was setted. The road still has patches of stone setts (cobbles) in between tarmac to this day. The steep road and the cobbles are seen as a challenge to push bikers, and the road is part of the Calder/Aire Bridleway link.

Hainworth is 975 feet (297 m) above sea level and sits high on the watershed for the River Worth to the north. It lies 1 mile (2 km) south of Keighley, 2 miles (3 km) east of Haworth and 1 mile (2 km) north of Cullingworth. The hamlet is adjoined to the east by Harden Moor and Hainworth Shaw, the site of Shaw Quarry which quarries for sandstone. This provided a third vocation for the population as some diversified from agriculture to being quarrymen.

Hainworth does not have any shopping facilities of its own, although the Guide Inn, on the crossroads of the Harden, Cullingworth, Keighley and Haworth roads, is listed as being in Hainworth. The hamlet used to have a Co-operative Society, reputedly the smallest in the United Kingdom with just 23 members, and a Wesleyan Chapel which opened in 1847, was rebuilt in 1884 and was closed in 1977. There is a cricket pitch with a local team named Ingrow. The pitch is also used to host the annual fun day.

The hamlet used to be in the ecclesiastical parish of Bingley, but in 1843 it was moved into Ingrow with Hainworth (instituted in 1843 as Ingrow-cum-Hainworth), with St John's, Ingrow, as the parish church. It retains the ecclesiastical parish of Ingrow with Hainworth, but is registered with the civil parish of Keighley for censuses.

== Transport ==
The hamlet is served by a circular bus service to and from Keighley twice a day. The 11-mile (18 km) circular walk, The Worth Way, which starts and ends in Keighley, passes through the centre of the village. The village is also on the Keighley leg of the Calder/Aire Bridleway Link which connects Keighley and Bingley with the Pennine Bridleway at Widdop Moor Reservoir.

== See also ==
- Listed buildings in Keighley
