= Hewenden Reservoir =

Reservoir in West Yorkshire, England

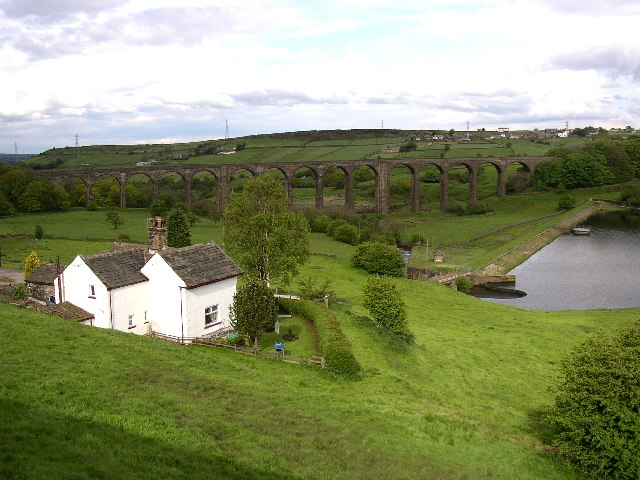
- Dam head showing Hewenden Viaduct

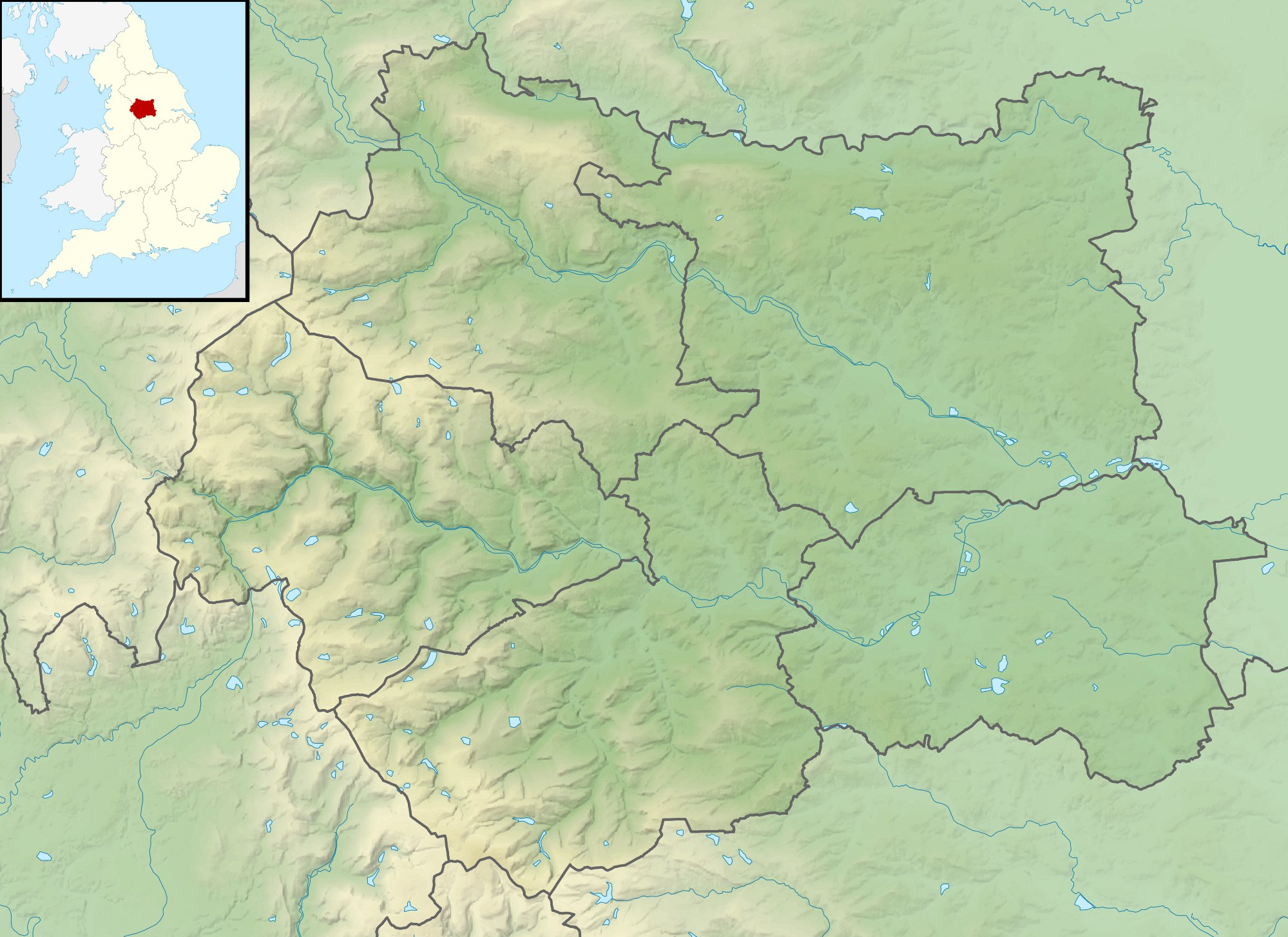
- Location within West Yorkshire
- Location: Cullingworth, West Yorkshire, England
- Coordinates: 53.816°N 1.889°W
- Type: Reservoir
- Primary outflows: Harden Beck
- Catchment area: 2,960 acres (1,196 ha)
- Managing agency: Yorkshire Water
- First flooded: 1845
- Surface area: 15 acres (6 ha)
- Average depth: 141 feet (43 m)
- Water volume: 8,915,400 cubic feet (252,457 m^{3})
- Surface elevation: 672 feet (204.8 m)

Hewenden Reservoir is a fresh-water reservoir near to Cullingworth in West Yorkshire, England. The Bradford Corporation built the reservoir, which was flooded in 1845, and is now part of the Yorkshire Water portfolio.

== History ==
Hewenden Reservoir was built as a result of the Bradford (Yorkshire) Water Act 1842 (5 & 6 Vict. c. vi). The act allowed the Bradford Corporation to abstract large volumes of water from Many Wells Spring, which supplied Hewenden Beck (Harden Beck). This concerned mill owners further downstream on Harden Beck. As a condition of the act, the reservoir at Hewenden was constructed as a compensation reservoir, which would guarantee a steady flow of water in Harden Beck.

During construction, "three large vertical cracks" appeared in one of the culverts that had just been built, and so remedial action was necessary to the dam walls. By January 1845, the remediation works were completed and the dam wall was complete. Minor works were finalised in the same year and flooding commenced in late spring, though by June, when the reservoir was about 66% full, the dam wall was observed as having collapsed in places. The final cost of the reservoir was £4,856 (equivalent to £510,000 in 2025).

The reservoir now feeds water into Harden Beck, with Hewenden itself being fed by Milking Hole Beck and Denholme Beck, the latter of which flows out from Doe Park Reservoir in Denholme, which has been culverted. Hewenden Reservoir is now owned and operated by Yorkshire Water.

The reservoir is noted for being one of the top ten recorded wettest places in Britain; in June 1956, 6.1 inches (155 mm) of rain fell in 120 minutes, at that time, the largest amount of rainfall ever recorded in Yorkshire. After a long period where the veracity of this claim was doubted in some meteorological circles, a review of the data and weather systems on the day, determined that 6 inches (152.4 mm) fell in 105 minutes. (Note: Data is different between sources. Some state 6.1 inches (150 mm), others state 6 inches (150 mm) in 105 minutes. However, studies have shown that a "convective instability over England caused severe thunderstorms and assessments of the storm efficiency gave results commensurate with the observation".) In 2008, the peak flow exiting the reservoir was noted at 2,800 cubic feet per second (79 m^{3}/s).
