= Bradford Pennine Gateway =

Nature reserve in West Yorkshire, England

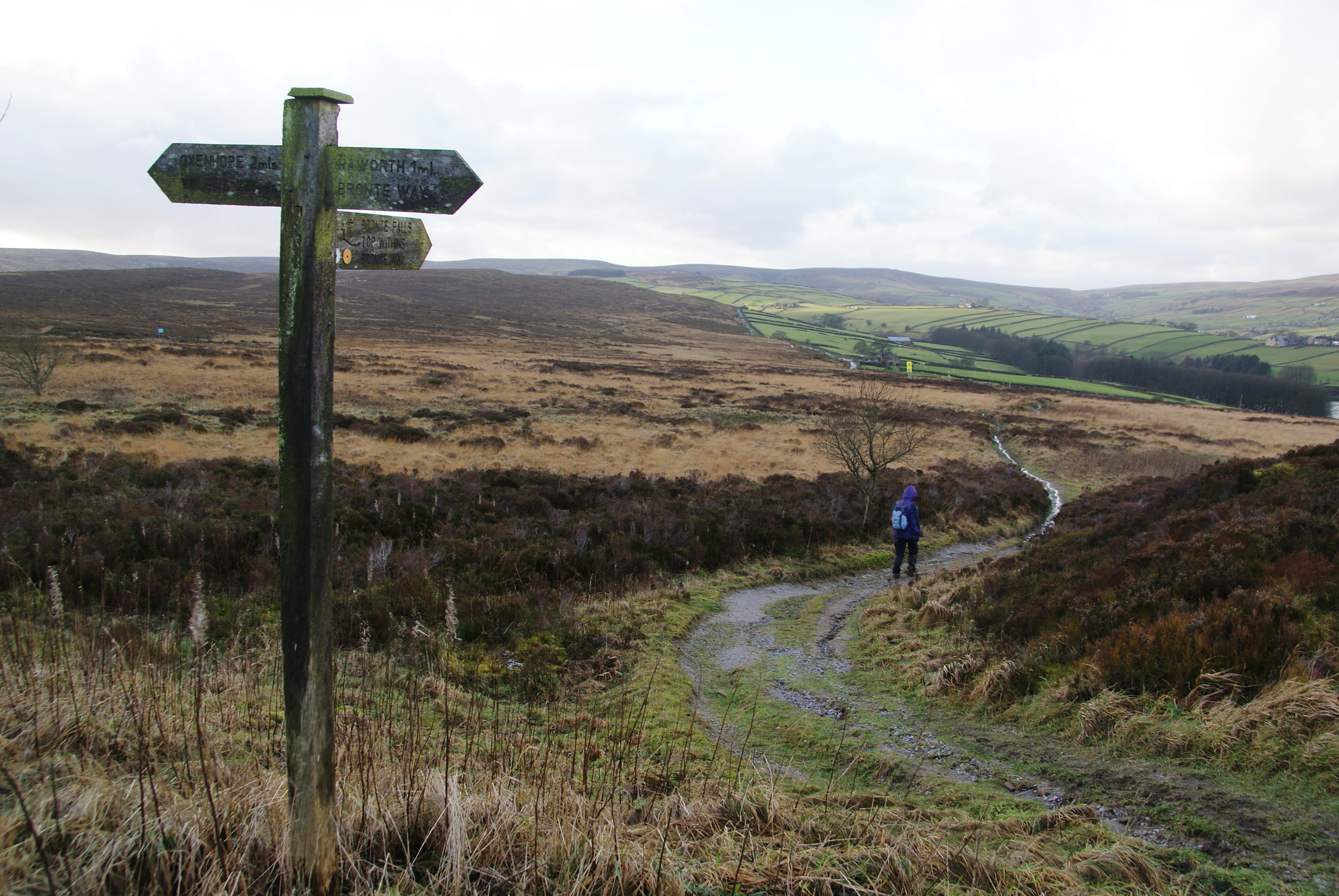
- Signpost on Penistone Hill
- Interactive map of Bradford Pennine Gateway
- Type: National nature reserve
- Nearest city: Bradford
- Coordinates: 53.846°N 1.843°W
- Area: 1,274 hectares (3,150 acres)
- Created: 2025
- Manager: Bradford City Council

Bradford Pennine Gateway is a national nature reserve (NNR) around Bradford in West Yorkshire, England. The site covers an area of 1,274 hectares (3,150 acres) around northern Bradford, in Haworth, Harden, Bingley, Baildon, Shipley, and Ilkley. It is the first national nature reserve in West Yorkshire, and one promoted as part of King Charles' "King's Series" of national nature reserves.

== Background ==
King Charles III has "..expressed a deep love and concern for England's wildlife, natural and rural places, frequently reflecting on his love of walking and its role in promoting a healthy mind and body." The King's Series project will designate five new NNRs every year between 2023 and 2027, making 25 new reserves in total. Natural England noted that Bradford has a population of 500,000, but is considered one of the most nature deprived cities in England.

== Designation and areas ==
The Bradford Pennine Gateway was created in May 2025 and consists of eight sites across north and western Bradford, covering an area of 1,274 hectares (3,150 acres), which is twice the size of Ilkley Moor. The designation allows for greater protection of certain habitats such as wetlands, heathlands and peat bogs, which are home to adders, short-eared owls, golden plovers and curlews. Just over 40% of the designated NNR will be newly protected, with 738 hectares (1,820 acres) being designated as a site of special scientific interest (SSSI). The reserve covers areas in and around Baildon, Bingley, Burley, the St Ives Estate, Harden Moor, Haworth, Shipley, Stanbury and Ilkley. One part of the NNR around Bingley is that of Bingley North Bog, created over 10,000 years ago by a retreating glacier which left sediment behind making a wetland area. Work began on Bingley North Bog in August 2025 to clear paths restore the site and remove invasive species. Bingley North Bog is home to curlews herons, bats kingfishers and dragonflies.

All of the sites contained within the reserve are managed by Bradford City Council, and it is hoped that the reserve will be the subject of field studies and research by local colleges and universities.

The reserve is the first NNR in West Yorkshire, and is the seventh reserve to be developed in the King's Series. It was included in the Conde Nast Traveller as one of the seven wonders of the world for 2026.
