= Temple Golf Club =

Golf club in Berkshire, England

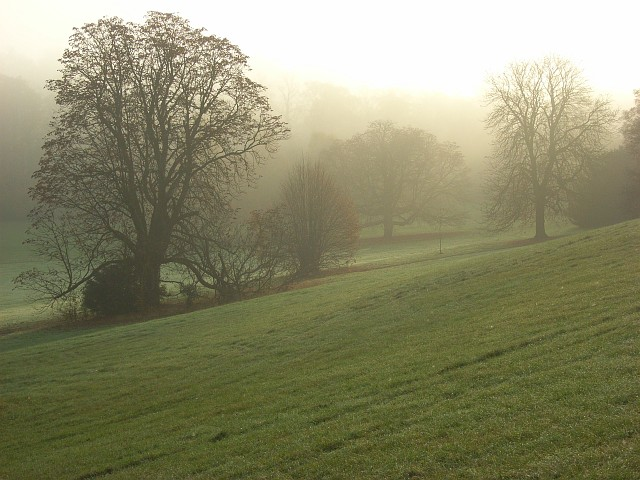

- Location within Berkshire
- 51°32′10″N 0°47′20″W

Club information
- Location: Hurley, Berkshire, England
- Established: 4 May 1910
- Tota holes: 18
- Website: www.templegolfclub.co.uk
- Designed by: Willie Park Jr.
- Par: 70
- Length: 6,210 yards (5,680 m)

Temple Golf Club is a golf club located in Hurley, Berkshire, England. It is about 2 miles northwest of Maidenhead. It was opened in 1910. The course was designed by Willie Park Jr.

== Location ==
The Temple golf course is on the right bank of the River Thames near Hurley, Berkshire, and not far from Maidenhead. It is on the edge of the Chiltern Hills, and is surrounded by beech woods. In the 19th century the land occupied by the golf course was part of Temple Park, (Note: Temple Park is named for the Knights Templar, who had a preceptory there.) in which many specimen trees had been planted. These were incorporated into the golf course layout. The course covered about 400 acres (160 ha) of the park. The terrain consists of a series of ridges, which were exploited by the designers.

== Course ==
A reviewer in 1920 wrote, "It may fairly be asserted that very few English golf links possess the beauties of Temple as regards the surroundings. From the terrace of the Club House the eye takes in a green expanse of English pastoral scenery which is bounded on the horizon by the bold, bluff outlines of the Chiltern Hills, and also takes in one of the most beautiful pieces of the Thames Valley by Marlow and Bisham."

The course is 6,210 yards (5,680 m) long, with par of 70. According to Henry Cotton, "Temple is tricky to score on, simply because no green is set up for the golf shot, so the ball goes forward off the pitch if incorrectly flighted and over hit. The turf is superb at Temple and the fairway lies almost too good to be true." Donald Steel said the course is "challenging enough to keep good players at full stretch without diminishing the enjoyment of the rank and file."

In 1999 Temple was the national winner of the British and International Golf Greenkeepers Association (BIGGA) Golf Environment Competition. According to BIGGA Judge Dr. Keith Duff, chief scientist at English Nature, "Temple provides the elusive feel good factor (often intangibly) when you play a course which both challenges the skills of the golfer, and at the same time, inspires you with its setting. In 2017 the club was a finalist for the BIGGA Greenkeeping Achievement of the Year award.

== History ==
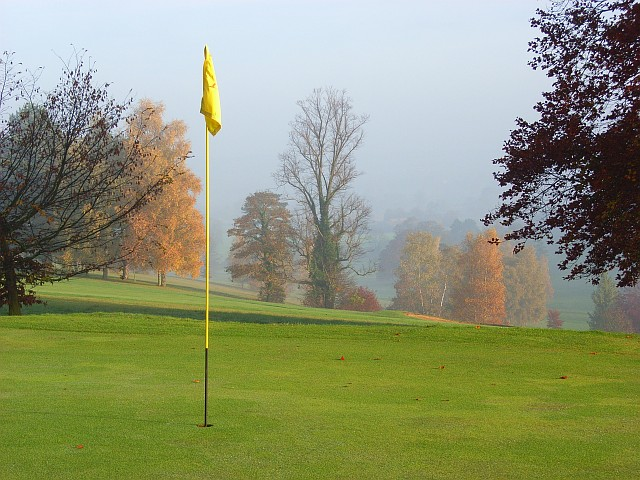
18th hole, just south of the 19th

The Temple Golf Club was founded in 1909 by some local landowners and army officers, including Colonel F. C. Ricardo, said to be the inspiration for Mr. Toad in Kenneth Grahame's The Wind in the Willows. The course, originally called Temple Links, was designed by Willie Park and James Hepburn. It opened on 4 May 1910. Maintenance in the early days was labour-intensive. The grass was cut using sickles, scythes and horse drawn mowing machines. The hillside was maintained by grazing sheep, and the hay was cut and baled by a local farmer. The course was home to wildlife such as geese and ducks in the marsh areas, partridge and pheasant, hare and deer.

In the early days there were relatively few members, and the course was not used much in winter. The fairways were very narrow, and there were many more bunkers than at present. The golfing enthusiast Raymond Oppenheimer was active in management of the course, which was owned by his family. At the age of 16 he was a scratch golfer at Temple. Players included Sam Snead, Lawson Little, Cyril Tolley, Bobby Locke, Peter Thomson, Joe Carr, Michael Bonallack and Henry Cotton. Cotton later became the club's professional. Raymond Oppenheimer withdrew from management of the course in 1969. Since then the course has been managed by a Committee of the Green and a chairman.

== Environment ==
The subsoil is chalky, which makes the course drier than most. It does not suffer from mud and puddles during wet weather. However, a dry summer did not burn the natural bent and fescue grasses that dominated the turf when the course opened. In the early 1970s the club installed a pop-up irrigation system. The combination of lack of aeration, excessive watering and fertilization and intensive mowing made the greens lush and soft, but damaged the grass quality, with the original bent and fescue grasses pushed out by annual meadow grass. The traditional hay meadows were destroyed, reducing the numbers of insects, butterflies, moths, birds and small mammals.

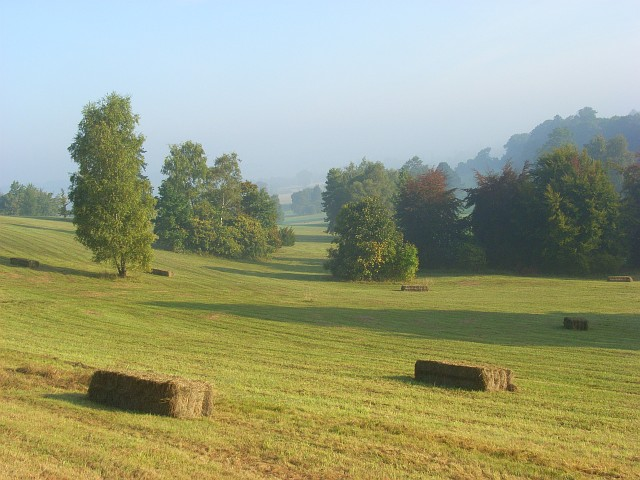
Bales of hay on the mown rough between fairways

There was still significant ecological value in the original grasslands, but the cutting regime was suppressing its development. In 1990 the club implemented changes in response to an ecological appraisal. These included changes to cutting regimes in the grassland roughs, and thinning, restocking and understory regeneration in the woodlands. Under the new regime, the roughs were cut twice each year, in spring and late summer. Cuttings were removed to avoid build-up of nutrients and thus to encourage growth of wild flowers rather than weed grasses. Semi-roughs were cut between once a week and once every three weeks. Between 1990 and 2007 the cost of fertilizer was cut in half and the cost of pesticides by almost three quarters. Water usage went down by two thirds.

The course as of 2011 consisted mainly of high-quality grassland but had large areas of mature semi-natural woodland, and long hedgerows. All were managed to maintain their ecological quality. The hay meadows cover about 20 hectares (49 acres) and support wildflowers, butterflies and birds. They are lightly cut in spring and harvested in autumn. The cut material is composted on site with other green waste, and the finished compost is applied to areas that have little or no topsoil.

The roughs and semi-roughs were studied in a report for the Berkshire, Buckinghamshire and Oxfordshire Naturalist Trust and the Windsor and Maidenhead Wildlife Group. It found more than 200 flowering plant species, including a colony of more than 200 green winged orchid plants which could justify scheduling as a Site of Special Scientific Interest. The woodland margins contain helleborines, spurge laurel and wood spurge. There was evidence that badgers had been foraging in the semi-roughs, and the woodland margins contained badger tracks and setts.

== Sources ==
- "An environmental temple" (PDF), Greenkeeper International, BIGGA, December 1999
- Cotton, Henry (1 May 1969), Guide to Golf in the British Isles, Manchester: World Distributors (Cliveden Press), p. 128, ISBN 0723505349
- Duff, Keith (27 November 2011), "Attracting birds to grassland and downland courses", Golf Business, Union Press
- "Finalists of the BIGGA Awards 2017 have been revealed", LADU Landscape & Amenity Product Update, 3 January 2017
- Paper-Maker and British Paper Trade Journal, London, 1920
- Peake, Malcolm (2001), Confessions of a Chairman of Green, Sports Turf Research Institute, ISBN 978-1-873431-45-0
- Raymond Oppenheimer, Royal Air Force Golfing Society
- Smith, Lorne (2009), "Temple", Fine Golf
- Taylor, Robert Stephen (1995), A Practical Guide to Ecological Management of the Golf Course, Sports Turf Research Institute, ISBN 978-1-873431-04-7
- Temple Ho, Temple Fm, Temple Lock, Temple Park, English Place-Name Society
