= Raymond Oppenheimer =

English businessman, golfer and Bull Terrier enthusiast

Raymond Harry Oppenheimer
- Born: 13 November 1905; England
- Died: 12 August 1984 (aged 78); Berkshire, England
- Occupations: Golfer, dog breeder

Raymond Harry Oppenheimer CBE (13 November 1905 – 12 August 1984) was an English businessman, golfer and Bull Terrier enthusiast. His family was wealthy from its interests in South African diamond mining. During World War II he became a wing commander in the Royal Air Force. In 1951 he was captain of the British team in the Walker Cup.

== Life ==
Raymond Harry Oppenheimer was born in England on 13 November 1905, son of Louis Oppenheimer and Charlotte Emily Oppenheimer. Oppenheimer's family operated the De Beers diamond mines in South Africa. His uncle was Sir Ernest Oppenheimer, co-founder of the Anglo American Corporation. He attended Harrow, an independent boys' school, then went on to the University of Oxford. He graduated in 1928 and joined the London office of his family's business. He became an executive just before World War II (1939–1945).

During the war Oppenheimer served in the Royal Air Force as a pilot officer, rising to the rank of wing commander. In 1957 he was still a bachelor at the age of 51, and lived in White Waltham Place, a mid-sized Georgian manor house in Maidenhead, Berkshire, set in a 300 acres (120 ha) estate. He had inherited the property from his father. He was a director of Anglo American, but had considerable free time to devote to sports and dog breeding. Oppenheimer died on 12 August 1984 in Berkshire, England.

== Golfer ==
At the age of 16 Oppenheimer was a scratch golfer at Temple Golf Club. In 1928 he was captain of the Oxford University golf team. He often won medals at St Andrews, and was a winning partner of Joyce Wethered at Worplesdon Golf Club. In 1930 he played for England in the annual England–Scotland Amateur Match.

Oppenheimer became active in management of the Temple course, which was owned by his family. From the late 1940s to the mid 1950s he was a strong international golf player with a +2 handicap. He was captain of the English golf team in 1947, 1948, 1950 and 1951. In 1951 he was also captain of the British team in the Walker Cup. Since 1952 the winning team in the Men's Home Internationals has received the Raymond Trophy, which Oppenheimer presented in 1952. The event is a competition for amateur golf teams representing England, Scotland, Wales and Ireland.

In 1952 Oppenheimer set up the Golf Foundation, a charity that gives children and young people the chance to play golf. He ensured that Henry Cotton was appointed as a Professional at Temple Golf Club in 1954. He was elected President of Temple Golf Club in 1956, holding office until his death. His golfing friends, many of whom played at Temple, included Sam Snead, Peter Thomson, Bobby Locke, Roger Wethered, Joyce Wethered, Bobby Jones and Molly Gourlay. Oppenheimer withdrew from active management of Temple in 1969.

== Dog breeder ==
Raymond Oppenheimer was judging Bull Terriers as early as 1939 at the Morris and Essex Show. By 1957 he had become the leading expert on Bull Terriers, and spent much of his time supervising his kennels and judging in Britain, Europe and the United States. In 1969 he and his partner Eva Weatherill were breeding dogs at their Ormandy-Souperlative kennel. These were the leading Bull Terrier kennels in England. In 1970 he donated 50 acres (20 ha) from his White Waltham estate for use as a British Dog Centre, which had been registered as a club and planned to hold a licensed dog show.

== Sources ==
- Banbury Bedrock - Our History, Banbury-Bedrock Bull Terriers
- Club History, Temple Golf Club
- Cohen, Jeffrey Edwards, "Wing Cmdr. Raymond Harry Oppenheimer, RAF", geni.com
- Eley, Mark (16 September 2019), "Men's Home Internationals", Golf Bible
- "England Wins Again – Defeat of Scottish Golf Team at St Andrews", The Glasgow Herald, p. 11, 26 May 1930
- Fletcher, Walter R. (1 March 1970), "Rich Briton Donates 50 Acres For a Shangri-La of Dogdom", The New York Times
- Peake, Malcolm (2001), Confessions of a Chairman of Green, Sports Turf Research Institute, ISBN 978-1-873431-45-0
- Raymond Oppenheimer, Royal Air Force Golfing Society (RAFGS), 5 November 20181
