= Ryecroft, West Yorkshire =

Hamlet in West Yorkshire, England

Coordinates: 53.8394°N 1.8854°W

Ryecroft
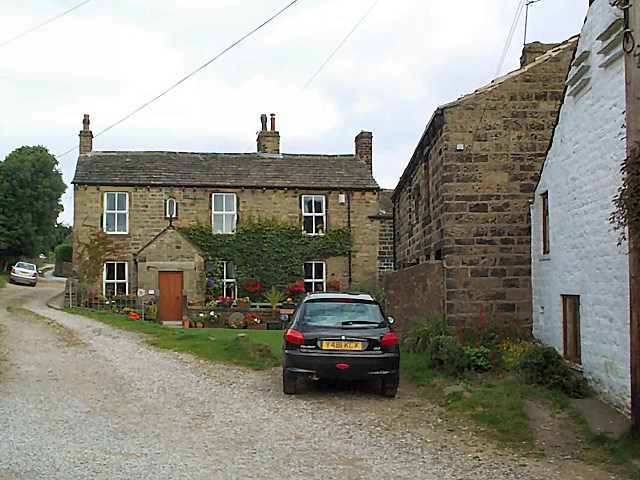
- Ryecroft hamlet

- Location within West Yorkshire
- OS grid reference: SE076381
- Civil parish: Harden
- Metropolitan borough: City of Bradford
- Metropolitan county: West Yorkshire
- Region: Yorkshire and the Humber
- Country: England
- Sovereign state: United Kingdom
- Post town: BINGLEY
- Postcode district: BD16
- Dialling code: 01535
- Police: West Yorkshire
- Fire: West Yorkshire
- Ambulance: Yorkshire

Ryecroft is a hamlet near to the village of Harden in West Yorkshire, England. The hamlet is on the road between Harden and Haworth, 1.9 miles (3 km) south of Keighley, 1.9 miles (3 km) west of Bingley and 0.6 miles (1 km) west of the centre of Harden.

== History ==
The name of the hamlet literally derives from Rye and Croft, a field where malting took place. The last building on the road through the village was marked on a 1908 Ordnance Survey map as being a malthouse. The hamlet wasn't mentioned in the Domesday Book, but was believed to have been settled around the 14th century when lands in and around Ryecroft were given to the monks of Rievaulx Abbey. However, the area was used by the Brigantes and the Romans long before it was settled, and a Roman Road either went past the settlement (on what is now the road to Haworth) or went through the village and across Harden Moor.

Although there is documentary evidence that the settlement had buildings in the 14th century, the oldest surviving buildings in the hamlet are from the 17th century. Ryecroft was traditionally referred to as being part of Harden, or the Harden Grange itself, as opposed to its own entity.

One of the earliest Primitive Methodist chapels in the Bradford area was built in the hamlet in the early 18th century. In November 1853, a Primitive Methodist chapel was opened up on the main road, just to the south of the settlement. The chapel was built on land given to the Methodist community by William Ferrand. The chapel on the main road had its own burial ground, but services ceased in 1945 and the chapel later became a private dwelling. The original chapel in the hamlet was used occasionally as a school room.

The hamlet is not connected to a mains water supply, and in 2006, the natural water spring used by the residents dried up. It had been in use since the 1700s. The residents formed a company and added a supplementary borehole to their water supply.

In the 2011 census, the hamlet was included in the details for Harden parish, although an estimate in 2005 stated that 40 people were living in the settlement.

== See also ==
- Listed buildings in Harden, West Yorkshire
