= Listed buildings in Harden, West Yorkshire =

Harden is a civil parish in the metropolitan borough of the City of Bradford, West Yorkshire, England. It contains 36 listed buildings that are recorded in the National Heritage List for England. Of these, one is listed at Grade II*, the middle of the three grades, and the others are at Grade II, the lowest grade. The parish contains the village of Harden, the smaller settlement of Ryecroft, and the surrounding area. In the area is the St Ives Estate, which contains a number of listed buildings. The other listed buildings include houses and associated structures, cottages, farmhouses and farm buildings, a boundary stone or guide post, a road bridge and a footbridge, two churches, and a war memorial.

== Key ==
Grade	Criteria
II*	Particularly important buildings of more than special interest
II	Buildings of national importance and special interest

== Buildings ==
Name and location	Photograph	Date	Notes	Grade
Barn east of Harden Hall; 53.83692°N 1.86950°W		1630	A stone barn with quoins, a stone slate roof, five bays and a single aisle. In the portal of the aisle is a square-headed cart entry, and in the angle are doorways with chamfered surrounds and composite jambs. Elsewhere are more doorways, including a blocked doorway with a dated lintel, and arrow slit vents. At the rear is a cart entry, and a single-light window with an arched lintel and sunken spandrels.	II
Wood Bank; 53.84057°N 1.86153°W	—	1635	A house to which a cottage was added in the 18th century. The buildings are in stone, with stone slate roofs and two storeys. The house is on a plinth, with a moulded string course, and a double-depth plan. At the rear are two wings with coped gables and kneelers, and between them is a later lean-to. Most of the windows are mullioned and transomed. In the right return is a doorway with a moulded surround, composite jambs, and an arched lintel carved with the date and an inscription in high relief. Above the doorway is a hood mould on consoles decorated with lunettes and arrow heads.	II
Harden Hall; 53.83683°N 1.86988°W		Early to mid 17th century	A large house that was extended in 1691, and again in about 1700. It is in stone and has a stone slate roof with coped gables and lantern finials. There are two storeys, and the house consists of a hall and cross-wing, a gabled extension at the rear, and a kitchen wing at right angles. There are two sash windows in the gabled wing, and the other windows are mullioned. In the kitchen wing is a date plaque and an upright oval window.	II*
Old Harden Grange; 53.84674°N 1.86046°W	—	Early to mid 17th century	The house is in gritstone, and has a stone slate roof with coped gables and kneelers. There are two storeys and an L-shaped plan, with a main range and a two-bay rear block. The windows are mullioned, some have been altered, and there are hood moulds over the ground floor windows. The doorway has Doric columns, an entablature, an inscribed Tudor arched lintel, and a cornice, above which is heraldic shield. Attached to the left of the house is a short wall containing a doorway with a moulded surround and a dated lintel.	II
Garden wall and mounting block, Harden Hall; 53.83674°N 1.86983°W	—	1658	The garden wall attached to the south front of the hall is in stone, with moulded coping and a ball finial. It contains a doorway with a chamfered surround and a Tudor arched and dated lintel. To the left is a mounting block consisting of five steps, and to the right is a moulded recess used as a seat.	II
Hill End Farmhouse; 53.83853°N 1.88066°W	—	Mid to late 17th century	The house was extended to the right in the 18th century. It is in gritstone, and has stone slate roofs with a coped gable on the left. There are two storeys and a cellar, the later house is taller, and there is a rear wing. In the earlier part is a doorway with monolithic jambs, and an inserted doorway with tie-stone jambs. The windows are mullioned, and there is a continuous hood mould over the ground floor openings. The later part has a Classical doorway in the left bay with pilasters, an entablature with triglyphs, and a triangular pediment. Above it is a sash window, and to the right is a nine-light mullioned window in each floor. At the rear are quoins, a doorway with tie-stone jambs and a Tudor arched lintel, mullioned windows, and a stair window with an arched lintel, a keystone and impost blocks.	II
Outbuilding northeast of 3 Cuckoo Nest; 53.84506°N 1.86250°W	—	Late 17th century	A small stone building with quoins, a stone slate roof with coped gables and kneelers, and one storey. The doorway has composite jambs and a quoined lintel. In the right return is a window lacking mullions, and in the apex of the gable is an arched window.	II
13 Ryecroft; 53.83933°N 1.88582°W	—	Late 17th century	A stone farmhouse that was rebuilt in the 18th century, it has quoins at the rear, and a stone slate roof with coped gables and kneelers. There are two storeys, three bays, and a rear outshut. On the front is a gabled porch with pointed side lights, and most of the windows are mullioned, with some blocked lights. Above the ground floor windows is a continuous hood mould. To the left of the house is a wall containing a segmental-arched gateway.	II
Gate piers, wall and balcony, Harden Hall; 53.83683°N 1.86959°W	—	Late 17th century	The gate piers are in stone, and have composite jambs, an entablature, a cornice, and ball finials. To the left is a balcony carried on columns with a moulded cornice and an entablature. This is approached by a flight of steps flanked by ramped walls with moulded coping.	II
Ivy House Farmhouse, Ryecroft; 53.83945°N 1.88535°W	—	Late 17th century	The farmhouse, which was rebuilt in the 18th century, is in stone with quoins, and a stone slate roof with a coped gable on the right. There are two storeys and a symmetrical front of three bays. In the centre is a gabled porch with kneelers, and above it is a round-headed niche. In the ground floor are inserted bow windows, and the upper floor contains three-light mullioned windows. At the rear is a two-light mullioned window and a small round-headed window.	II
Ivy House Farmhouse, Harden; 53.83596°N 1.87430°W	—	1676	A stone farmhouse on a plinth, that has a stone slate roof with coped gables and kneelers. There are two storeys, a double-depth plan, and two bays, and the windows are mullioned. In the right return is a 20th-century porch and a doorway with a square head, a chamfered surround, composite jambs, and a lintel with the date in high relief.	II
Cottage, Old Harden Grange; 53.84671°N 1.86076°W		1680	The building, which was extended to the left in the early 18th century, is in stone with a stone slate roof and two storeys. The original doorway, now blocked, is arched, with voussoirs, a dated keystone and a moulded hood mould. To the right is an inserted doorway with a moulded surround and monolithic jambs. The windows are mullioned, with a hood mould over the ground floor windows, and in the upper floor is a window with an architrave and a cornice carved with a chalice and paten. The later part has rusticated quoins, and four bays with gables. The gables are coped, they have ball finials, and contain oval windows. The other windows have architraves and false keystones. On the right gable is a bellcote with a pyramidal roof and finial, and at the rear is a doorway with a pointed arch in the upper floor, approached by external steps.	II
Cuckoo Nest; 53.84500°N 1.86281°W	—	1693	A house later extended to the right and divided, it is in stone, with a stone slate roof and a coped gable to the left with kneelers. There are two storeys, and a double-depth plan. The main doorway has an architrave, jambs treated as rusticated quoins, and a dated lintel, and above it is an oculus. At the rear is a doorway with a chamfered surround and segmental lintel. Most of the windows are mullioned, with a hood mould over the ground floor windows. There is a single-light window on the front and a cross window at the rear.	II
Steps, gate piers and walls, Cuckoo Nest; 53.84489°N 1.86281°W	—	1693 (probable)	A flight of nine semicircular steps, with low gate piers at the top flanked by walls. They are all in stone, and the piers and walls have moulded coping.	II
2 and 3 Crowther Fold; 53.84228°N 1.87093°W	—	1700	A row of three cottages, later combined into two, the later ones dated 1776. They are in stone with quoins and stone slate roofs. There are two storeys, each cottage has one bay, and at the rear, the earlier cottage has a single storey. The cottages on the front have doorways with chamfered surrounds and tie-stone jambs, and mullioned windows. The doorway in the rear cottage has a chamfered surround, monolithic jambs, and a dated lintel.	II
Ferrands Stone; 53.84156°N 1.86558°W		1713	The stone, set into a stone wall, marks the boundary of the St Ives Estate. It is a vertical stone slab with arched head, the head carved with various motifs, and below is an inscription.	II
Barn southeast of Harden Hall; 53.83678°N 1.86930°W	—	Early 18th century (probable)	The barn has a timber framed core and is encased in stone. It has quoins, and a stone slate roof with coped gables and kneelers. There are four bays and a single two-bay aisle. The barn contains a segmental-arched cart entry with a chamfered surround and a quoined lintel. Elsewhere, there are doorways with chamfered surrounds and quoined lintels, rectangular vents, and a wide pitching hole, and on the gable is a weathervane.	II
Walls to the south of the Cottage, Old Harden Grange; 53.84663°N 1.86062°W	—	Early 18th century	Two stone walls enclose a courtyard to the south of the cottage, one is attached to it, and the other is at right angles to the first. The attached wall is coped, and contains a semicircular-arched doorway with a moulded surround, and to the side is an inscribed datestone. The other wall consists of an open arcade with four pointed arches, and smaller arches in the spandrels, each arch surmounted by a cross.	II
Wall to the rear of the Cottage, Old Harden Grange; 53.84678°N 1.86088°W	—	Early 18th century (possible)	The wall extending from the rear of the cottage, partly enclosing the kitchen garden, is in stone with quoins and coping. It is tall and stepped, and has paired ball finials on each side of a gateway with composite jambs.	II
Barn north of 13 Ryecroft; 53.83947°N 1.88573°W	—	1743	The barn is in stone with a stone slate roof and two storeys. It contains a segmental-arched cart entry, and a door with a dated lintel. At the rear is a doorway with quoined jambs and a large stone lintel, and in the upper floor is a doorway with a plain surround.	II
Hostel Stone; 53.83860°N 1.87944°W		18th century (probable)	The stone, which stands at a road junction, is thought to be a boundary stone or a guide post. It is rectangular with an arched head, and has an inscription which is indecipherable.	II
Ryecroft Farmhouse; 53.84034°N 1.88550°W	—	18th century (probable)	Probably originally a chapel and later a farmhouse, it is in stone with a stone slate roof, two storeys and an attic. The front is gabled, with bands and three bays. The middle bay contains an arched recess, with three-light mullioned windows in the lower floors, in the attic is a Venetian window with a keystone and impost blocks, and in the outer bays are single-light windows. The left return has quoins, and contains two doorways and windows.	II
Stable block, Harden Grange Farm; 53.84079°N 1.85578°W	—	c. 1760	The stable block is in stone, with a hipped stone slate roof, two storeys and a U-shaped plan. The main range has a symmetrical front of five bays, a band, and an impost eaves band. The central bay has a pedimented gable and a semicircular arched entry with voussoirs. The north range contains an upper floor doorway approached by 13 external steps, and in the west range is a segmental-arched cart entry.	II
Harden Beck Bridge; 53.83647°N 1.86728°W		Late 18th century (probable)	The bridge carries Harden Lane over Harden Beck. It is in stone, and consists of two segmental arches. The bridge has a band and a coped parapet, and a central pier with a cutwater.	II
Footbridge, St Ives Estate; 53.84625°N 1.86354°W		Late 18th century (probable)	The footbridge is in stone, and consists of a single segmental arch. It has a parapet with a keystone and two voussoirs, and is open beneath.	II
St. Ives Mansion House; 53.84646°N 1.85999°W		c. 1830	A large house that was extended in about 1854, and later divided and used for other purposes. It is in stone with blue slate roofs. There are two storeys, and a U-shaped plan, with a front of eleven bays, and rear wings. At the rear is a Doric porte-cochère. On the front are two projecting three-storey towers and an oriel window, and the other windows are sashes. In the right return are canted bay windows.	II
Goit Stock Cottages; 53.83368°N 1.87948°W	—	Late 18th or early 19th century	A terrace of six stone cottages that has been extended at the ends. There are two storeys and six bays. The windows are mullioned, and some doorways have been converted into windows.	II
Entrance gate piers, St Ives Estate; 53.84576°N 1.85002°W	—	Late 18th or early 19th century	The gate piers at the entrance to the drive are in stone with a square plan. They have bands of vermiculated rustication and are surmounted by ball finials.	II
Barn Low Park; 53.84523°N 1.85726°W	—	Early to mid 19th century	The barn, designed as an eyecatcher, is in sandstone on a plinth, with string course and a stone slate roof. It has a rectangular plan, and contains various doorways and windows.	II
Betty's Lodge; 53.84737°N 1.85130°W		Early to mid 19th century	The lodge at the entrance to St Ives Estate, it is in stone with a hipped stone slate roof. There is a single storey, and a T-shaped plan, with a semi-octagonal projection at the front. In three of the faces of the projection are windows with pointed heads and Y-tracery. Elsewhere are doorways and more windows with pointed heads. The roof of the projection is oversailing and is carried on wooden posts.	II
Harden Wesleyan Methodist Church; 53.84065°N 1.87024°W		1853	The church, later converted for residential use, is in stone, with a roof of Welsh blue slate, and it has two storeys. The front is symmetrical with three bays, and a pedimented gable with a date and name plaque in the tympanum. There are two doorways, each with pilasters, an entablature, a fanlight, and a cornice, and the windows are round-arched with voussoirs.	II
Harden Congregational Church; 53.84113°N 1.87043°W		1865	The church is in stone with a roof of Welsh blue slate, and two storeys. The front is symmetrical, with three bays, and a pedimented gable with a scrolled cartouche in the tympanum. There are corner pilasters, and a string course, and in the centre steps lead up to a doorway with pilasters, an arched fanlight with panelled spandrels, and a cornice. The windows have round-arched heads with archivolts and keystones. In the upper storey the central windows are paired with a Tuscan column between them, and an impost band, and above is a frieze and a modillioned cornice. Along the sides are five bays containing round-arched windows.	II
Dutch barn, Home Farm; 53.84714°N 1.86150°W	—	Late 19th century (probable)	The Dutch barn is at the rear of the buildings on Home Farm on the St Ives Estate. It is in timber with a felted roof. There are circular corner posts carrying a hipped roof.	II
Stable block, St Ives Estate; 53.84751°N 1.85782°W		1900	The stable block, later used for other purposes, is in stone with a slate roof, and a V-shaped plan. The central block has two storeys, and is symmetrical with five bays, there are pilasters between the bays, and large semicircular arches in the middle three bays. The middle bay contains a recessed entrance, and each window in the upper floor has a segmental lintel, false ogee lintels to the lights, and domed caps. The wings have coped gables, kneelers and finials. The left wing has one storey, the right wing has two storeys, and it contains a datestone over a mullioned window. In the apex of the gable is a cross of the Knights Templar, probably re-set.	II
Harden War Memorial; 53.84123°N 1.87098°W		1920	The war memorial stands near a road junction, it is in sandstone, and consists of a cross on a Tuscan column on a shaped hexagonal base, standing on a plinth of two hexagonal steps. On the base are inscriptions, and on the plinth are the names of those lost in the two World Wars. The memorial is set on a stone-flagged platform approached by steps flanked by piers with pyramidal caps and ramped walls. At the rear is a stepped millstone grit wall.	II
