= Harden Beck =

Beck in West Yorkshire, England

Coordinates: 53°49′02.6″N 1°53′25.7″W

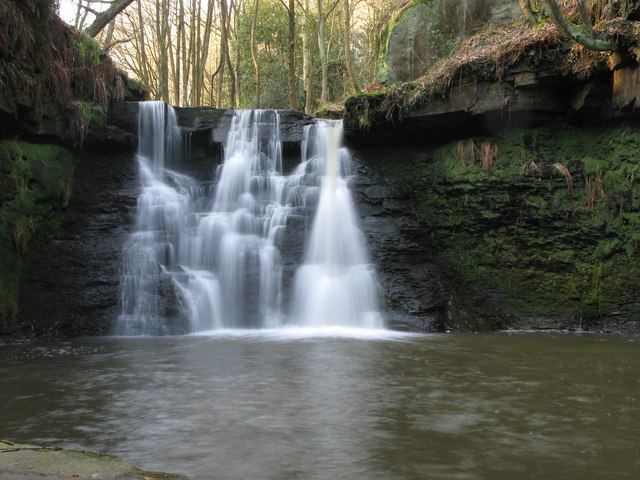
- Goit Stock Waterfall in Goit Stock Wood

Location
- Country: England
- Counties: West Yorkshire
- District: Bradford

Physical characteristics
- Source
  - location: Hewenden Reservoir, West Yorkshire
- Mouth
  - location: Beckfoot, Bingley, West Yorkshire
- Length: 14.55 km (9.04 mi)
- Basin size: 33.228 km^{2} (12.829 sq mi)
- Discharge
  - location: River Aire

Basin features
- Tributaries
  - left: Cow House Beck, Midgram Beck
  - right: Mytholmes Beck

Harden Beck is a stream that flows from Hewenden Reservoir, over Goit Stock Waterfall to the River Aire in Bingley, West Yorkshire. The route starts out further up the valley as Denholme Beck, Hewenden Beck and Hallas Beck. Its waters are fed by Thornton Moor Reservoir, Stubden Reservoir, Doe Park Reservoir and Hewenden Reservoir.

Harden Beck is an overflow channel of Glacial Erosion which was carved out during the last ice age. The section after the waterfall down to the bridge under the road to Wilsden, is locally referred to as 'The Hidden Valley.'

Mapping lists Harden Beck as starting where Hallas Beck and Cow House Beck meet, but documents from Bradford Council and the Yorkshire Invasive Species Forum list the beck as starting at the dam head from Hewenden reservoir

In his book, Chronicles of Old Bingley, Harry Speight says that the Beck does start at the confluence of Hallas and Cow House Becks and that Harden Beck was a dividing line in the parishes, deaneries and the Wapentakes.

== History ==
In a book on the place names of West Yorkshire, Harden and Harden Beck are listed as Heredene, Heredenbroc and Hardenbrok which translates as either Rock Valley or Hare Valley Beck. In the Topographical Dictionary of England, Lewis describes the Beck as "powerful Harden Beck, which abounds with trout, runs through a hamlet, and propels the machinery of three worsted mills in which the greater part of the population is employed."

There were actually six mills on the beck; (from upstream down) Hewenden Mill, Bents Mill, Hallas Bridge Mill, Goit Stock Mill, Harden Bridge Mill and Beckfoot Mill. Hewenden, Bents and Beckfoot mills have all since been converted into private accommodation buildings. Hallas Bridge Mill was destroyed by fire. Goit Stock Mill was later utilised as a café and ballroom. It too burnt down (in 1927) with no reports of casualties. Its chimney and flue are still extant, with the chimney being built on the northern ridge to aid the dispersal of smoke from the narrow valley. Harden Bridge Mill is still in private use as a printers.

Hewenden Reservoir was built as a compensation reservoir for the mill owners on Harden Beck who demanded a structure of its type when the Bradford Corporation started abstracting water from Manywells Spring to their reservoirs, 7 miles (11 km) away at Chellow Dean.

== Description of route ==
The watercourse starts at the eastern edge of the A629 Keighley to Halifax road in Denholme. Here, several springs feed Denholme beck which flows into Doe Park Reservoir. Doe Park is also fed by Stubden and Thornton Moor reservoirs via Stubden Beck. The outflow from the reservoir flows northwards into Hewenden Reservoir, where it in turns flows north eastwards as Hewenden Beck as far as Hallas Bridge where it becomes Hallas Beck. On entering Goit Stock Wood, the course becomes Harden Beck at the confluence of Cow House Beck and Hallas Beck.

Form here it flows mostly eastwards with Midgram Beck and Mytholmes Beck joining the course adjacent to Ruin Bank Wood. The Beck skirts the northern edge of Shipley Golf Course, through the ford and then under the bridge at Beckfoot before joining the River Aire in Bingley.

== Bridges ==
Hewenden Viaduct is to the immediate north east of the dam head of Hewenden Reservoir and was built by the Great Northern Railway in 1884 and after the railway closed became part of the Great Northern Trail. Hallas and Goit Stock have footbridges. There is a bridge over the beck by The Malt Shovel Public House in Harden which links Harden village with Wilsden. This bridge is a Grade II listed structure from the 18th century.

Where the Beck curves between Ruin Bank Wood and Harden Grange is a Grade II listed footbridge. The footbridge is on the north west corner of Shipley Golf Course and was listed in 1974.

Another Grade II listed crossing is Beckfoot Bridge. It was listed in 1974 and spans the beck just before it enters into the right fork of the River Aire in Bingley. The bridge here dates from at least 1723 and is a Packhorse Bridge. There is a ford adjacent as the bridge is only wide enough for a single horse. The ford is deceptively deep and the water is fast flowing. People have had their vehicles washed downstream whilst trying to cross here and it would be unwise to cross, even in a 4 x 4.

== Ecology and environment ==
The beck flows through Goit Stock Wood, which is known for being a good example of broadleaf woodland. The water cascades over Goit stock waterfall which is 20 ft (6.1 m) high. The waterfall was known as Hallas Lumb until the early 1820s when its name was changed to Goit Stock.

The beck has seen pollution over its history, but trout and crayfish have been observed in the water. Goit Stock Woods and Harden Beck are listed as an SEGI (Site of Ecological and Geological Importance) by Bradford Council. The beck is subject to the invasive plants of Himalayan Balsam and Japanese Knotweed in a 0.5 km section upstream of Harden Beck Bridge in Harden village.

In 2017, the weir at Beckfoot Mill was removed in the central portion to allow grayling to navigate upstream. As the mill is now private dwellings, its goit was no longer necessary and as the weir was a barrier to fish passage, it was cut open.

== Navigation ==
The beck is not navigable to boats at any point. The reservoirs upstream are deep and wide enough to allow boating, although there is no evidence of this on Hewenden Reservoir.

== Literary connections ==
Harden Beck was home to John Nicholson, The Airedale Poet, in the early nineteenth century. He was often out walking alongside the beck, looking for inspiration. He is said to have written many works beside the beck and by Goit Stock Waterfall, which he often visited in the dead of night.

In 2012, as part of the Ilkley literature festival, the walk alongside Harden Beck became part of the Stanza Stones Poetry Trail. Developed by poet Simon Armitage and Tom Lonsdale, the walk takes in 47 miles (76 km) across moorland and water to inspire walkers.

== See also ==
- List of waterfalls
- List of waterfalls in England
