= Listed buildings in Wilsden =

Wilsden is a civil parish in the metropolitan borough of the City of Bradford, West Yorkshire, England. It contains 19 listed buildings that are recorded in the National Heritage List for England. All the listed buildings are designated at Grade II, the lowest of the three grades, which is applied to "buildings of national importance and special interest". The parish contains the village of Wilsden and the surrounding countryside. Most of the listed buildings are houses and cottages, farmhouses and farm buildings. The other listed buildings include a public house, a former school, a folly, a former mill, a railway viaduct, and a Sunday school.

== Buildings ==
Name and location	Photograph	Date	Notes
Barn, Norr Fold Farm; 53.82467°N 1.85498°W	—	Late 16th or early 17th century	The barn is timber framed and was clad in stone in the 18th century. It has quoins and a stone slate roof, five bays, and a single aisle. The barn contains a segmental-arched cart entry in the aisle with a deeply curved inner lintel, and a blocked doorway with a chamfered surround and double tie-stone jambs.
Lee Farmhouse and barn 53.82636°N 1.86347°W	—	Mid 17th century	The farmhouse and attached barn are in stone, and have a stone slate roof with a coped gable and kneelers. There are two storeys and a T-shaped plan, consisting of a hall range and a cross-wing. The doorway has monolithic jambs, most of the windows are mullioned, some have been altered, and some have hood moulds. The barn contains a semicircular-arched cart entry with chamfered voussoirs, and an initialled and dated keystone.
Malt Shovel Inn; 53.83647°N 1.86677°W		Mid to late 17th century	The public house is in stone, with quoins, and a stone slate roof with a coped gable on the left. There are two storeys, a double-depth plan, and a single-storey rear outshut. The windows are mullioned, and those in the ground floor have a continuous hood mould. The wall of the left return is rendered, and contains a doorway with monolithic jambs.
Norr Fold Farmhouse and Cottage; 53.82462°N 1.85466°W	—	1679	The cottage was added to the farmhouse in the 19th century, the buildings are in stone with stone slate roofs, and have two storeys. The house has quoins, a roof with coping and a shaped kneeler on the right, a double-depth plan, and a two-storey outshut at the rear. The doorway has a moulded surround, composite jambs, a dated arched lintel, and a cornice. The windows are mullioned, with some mullions removed, and there is a hood mould over the ground floor window. A flight of steps leads up to a doorway with tie-stone jambs in the upper floor. The cottage has three bays, a double depth plan, mullioned windows, and two doorways, one blocked, with tie-stone jambs.
Bank Bottom Cottage; 53.83431°N 1.86590°W	—	c. 1680	A school, later a private house, it was extended in the 20th century. The house is in stone with quoins, and a stone slate roof with a coped gable and kneelers. There is one storey, and the original part has three bays. It contains an inserted doorway with an altered window to the left, and a mullioned window with three arched lights and sunken spandrels on the right.
Manor House and barn 53.82546°N 1.86242°W	—	1684	The house and barn, which have been altered, are in stone with a stone slate roof. The house has two storeys, a double-depth plan, and a single-storey rear outshut. On the front is a gabled porch with a decorative ogee lintel, above which is a datestone, and kneelers. In the upper floor is a four-light mullioned window, and most of the other windows have been altered. The barn on the right has an altered cart entry.
Mytholme; 53.83546°N 1.86528°W	—	c. 1700	A stone house with quoins, a band, and a stone slate roof with coped gables and kneelers. There are two storeys and seven bays. On the front is a later two-storey gabled porch with a finial. It has a Tudor arched dated lintel and a re-set datestone. Most of the windows are cross windows with mullions.
Walls flanking footpaths 53.82352°N 1.86187°W	—	18th century (probable)	The walls flanking the footpaths run in two diagonals. They are in dry stone, and stones are set on the top on edge to form coping.
Woodlands Farmhouse and Cottage; 53.82403°N 1.86648°W	—	Mid 18th century	The house and the cottage, which may be earlier, are in stone with stone slate roofs. The house has quoins, a band, an eaves cornice, and coped gables. There are two storeys and a symmetrical front of three bays. The central doorway has an architrave, above it is a single-light window, and the other windows are mullioned with two lights. The cottage to the left is rendered, it has a single storey and a single bay, and contains a doorway with monolithic jambs, and mullioned windows.
Spring Mill House; 53.82464°N 1.86215°W	—	Late 18th century	A stone house with quoins, a band, shaped gutter brackets and a stone slate roof. There are two storeys and two bays. In each storey of each bay is a Venetian window with impost blocks and keystones. In the right return is a porch with a circular window in the gable, a single-light window above, and flanking two-light windows.
St. David's Ruin; 53.83583°N 1.85917°W		1796	A folly in stone, consisting of a wall, a pointed arch, and a short circular tower, all in ruin. The tower contains a doorway with an inscribed and dated lintel and two windows, all with pointed arches. On the tower is a roll-moulded band.
134 and 136 Main Street; 53.82227°N 1.85976°W	—	Early 19th century	A pair of stone houses with a moulded gutter and a stone slate roof. There are two storeys, and a symmetrical front of four bays. In the centre are paired doorways, each with monolithic jambs, a cornice, an entablature with carved decoration, and a pediment. The windows contain small-paned upper casements.
Mill by Hewenden Beck; 53.82420°N 1.88358°W		Early 19th century	The former mill is in stone with a stone slate roof. There are three storeys and twelve bays. The windows are small-paned with upper casements. On the left bay is a toilet tower with a semicircular plan, at the rear is a semicircular stair tower, and the chimney is rectangular and tapering.
2–16 Chapel Row; 53.82513°N 1.86372°W		Early to mid 19th century	A terrace of eight stone cottages with a stone slate roof. There are two storeys, each cottage has a double-depth plan and two bays. In the right bay of each cottage is a doorway with monolithic jambs, over which is a two-light window. The other bay contains a three-light stepped window in both floors; all the windows are mullioned.
4–20 Club Row; 53.82279°N 1.86065°W	—	Early to mid 19th century	A terrace of eight stone cottages with a stone slate roof, and another cottage added later to the left. There are two storeys, each cottage has a double-depth plan and two bays. In the left bay of each cottage is a doorway with monolithic jambs, over which is a two-light window. The other bay contains a three-light stepped window in both floors; the windows were all mullioned, and some have been altered. The right end fronts Main Street, and contains a shop window.
71 to 77 Main Street and 1 to 5 Garden View; 53.82499°N 1.86187°W		1837	A block of cottages in stone, with a sill band, paired gutter brackets, and a stone slate roof. They have an L-shaped plan, consisting of a front range of three storeys and eight bays, and a rear two-storey range. On the front is an arched cart entry with a datestone and keystone at the rear. The doorways have monolithic jambs, above which are single-light windows. The other windows have two lights, some with sashes.
Mechanics Institute; 53.82375°N 1.86113°W		1837	The former mechanics' institute is in stone, with a moulded gutter, and a hipped roof of blue Welsh slate. There are two and three storeys, a symmetrical front of three bays, and six bays on the sides. The central doorway has monolithic jambs, a fanlight, and a cornice on consoles, and above it is an inscribed and dated plaque. Along the sides are inserted doorways.
Hewenden Viaduct; 53.81862°N 1.88736°W		c. 1880	The viaduct was built by the Great Northern Railway to carry its line over the valley of Hewenden Beck. It is in stone and curved, and consists of 17 semicircular arches, the piers carrying the five middle arches being thicker with projecting pilasters. The viaduct is 120 feet (37 m) high and has spans of 50 feet (15 m). It has bands and parapets, and at both ends are abutments.
Wilsden Independent Sunday School; 53.82133°N 1.85932°W		1890	The Sunday school is in stone, with a roof of Westmorland green slate and ridge tiles. The front facing the street is symmetrical, with a single storey and five bays, the middle three bays wider and under a gable. These contain three windows with a circle in the apex of each, and another circular window in the gable apex with the date above. The side bays contain porches and three-light mullioned windows.
