= Beckfoot Bridge =

Historically a significant crossing point over Harden Beck, West Yorkshire, England

Coordinates: 53.8422°N 1.8418°W

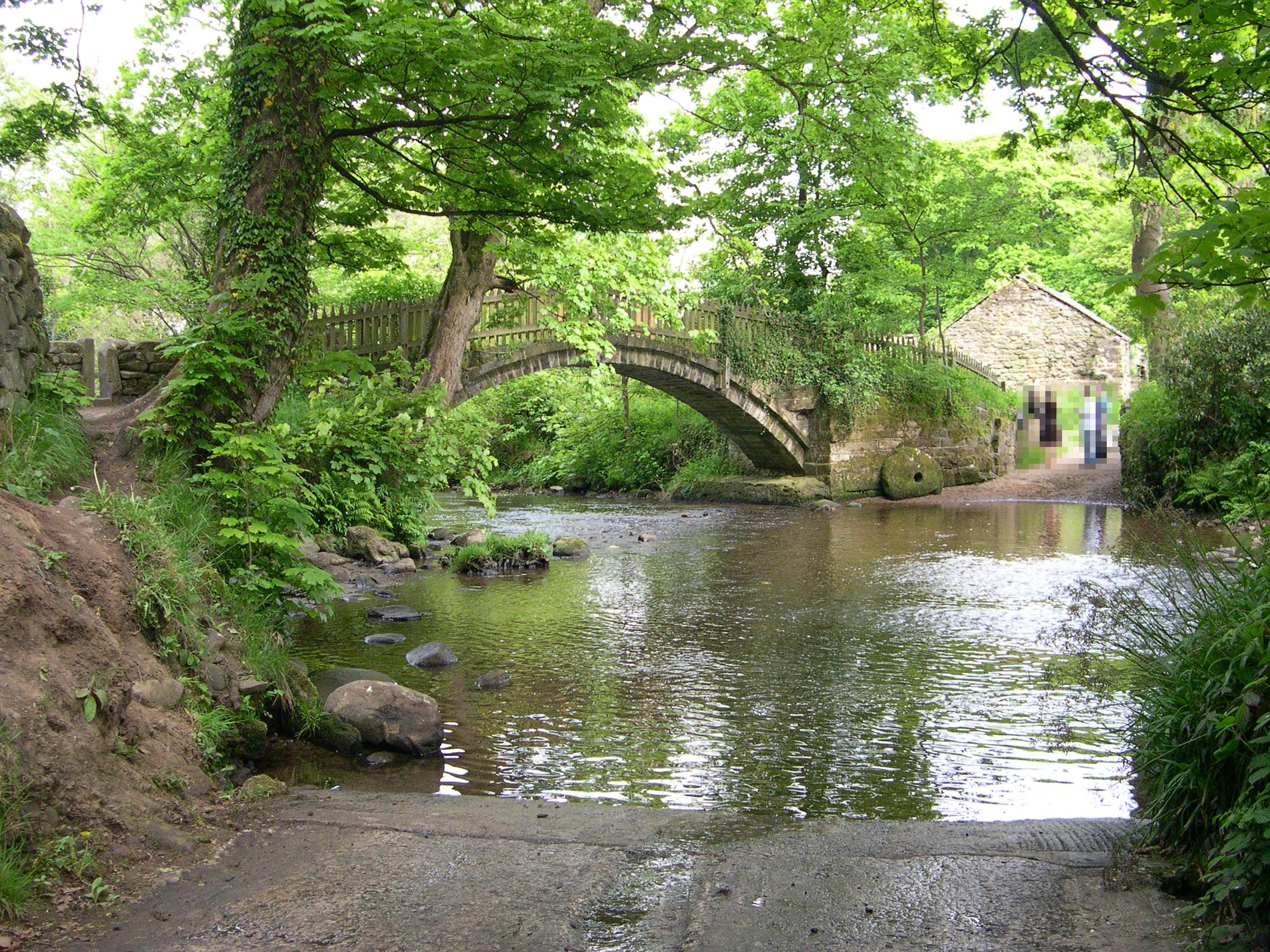
Beckfoot Bridge and ford

Beckfoot Bridge (also known as the Packhorse Bridge) is a footbridge over Harden Beck which was historically a significant crossing point. It is located in Bingley, West Yorkshire.

The cost of repair and maintenance of bridges was meted out by either the county, wapentake, parish or township, dependent on the bridge's importance. Beckfoot Bridge was the responsibility of Bingley Township as Ireland and Cottingley bridges were built rebuilt in stone and afforded better links to the town.

It was constructed alongside the historical ford across the beck in 1723, replacing a previous wooden bridge. Two contractors were paid £10 to build the bridge and to maintain it and keep it in good order for seven years. It is wide enough for pedestrians or single file horses. In 1974, it was given grade II listed building status.

== See also ==
- Listed buildings in Bingley
