= Listed buildings in Cullingworth =

Cullingworth is a civil parish in the metropolitan borough of the City of Bradford, West Yorkshire, England. It contains 21 listed buildings that are recorded in the National Heritage List for England. All the listed buildings are designated at Grade II, the lowest of the three grades, which is applied to "buildings of national importance and special interest". The parish contains the village of Cullingworth and the surrounding countryside. Most of the listed buildings are houses and cottages, farmhouses and farm buildings. The other listed buildings are churches and associated structures, a former chapel, and a war memorial

== Buildings ==
| Name and location | Photograph | Date | Notes |
|---|---|---|---|
| 5 Station Road; 53.82819°N 1.89977°W | | Mid 17th century | A single-storey cottage raised to two storeys in the 19th century, it is in gritstone, and has a stone slate roof with coped gables and kneelers. The doorway has a chamfered surround and a Tudor arch with inscriptions in the spandrels. The windows are mullioned, those in the ground floor have hood moulds, and above the doorway is an inserted window. |
| Manor Farm and Cottage; 53.82812°N 1.89996°W | — | Mid 17th century | A house, later divided, it is in gritstone, and has a stone slate roof with a kneeler on the right gable. There are two storeys, a double-depth plan, and three bays. The doorways have moulded surrounds and Tudor arched lintels, and to the right is a gabled open porch. The windows are mullioned, with some mullions missing, and over the ground floor openings is a continuous hood mould. |
| Cow House Farmhouse; 53.83160°N 1.89524°W | — | Mid to late 17th century | The house was altered in the 19th century and has been divided. It is in stone and has a stone slate roof with coped gables and kneelers. There are two storeys, three bays, a double-depth plan, and a continuous outshut at the rear. The doorway has a square head and a chamfered surround, and there is an inserted doorway with monolithic jambs. The windows are mullioned with some mullions removed, and the ground floor windows have hood moulds. |
| Cullingworth Fields Farmhouse; 53.82884°N 1.91040°W | — | 1684 | A stone farmhouse that has a stone slate roof with coped gables and kneelers. There are two storeys, three bays, a double-depth plan, and a rear outshut. On the front is a gabled porch on a plinth, with an open doorway that has a dated and moulded surround. The inner doorway has a chamfered surround and an arched lintel. The windows are mullioned, with some mullions missing, and in the right return is a three-light window, the middle light taller and round-headed. |
| Hallas Hall Farm Cottages; 53.82529°N 1.88707°W | — | c. 1700 | A house, Hallas Old Hall, later divided into cottages, it is in gritstone on a plinth, with a moulded band, and a stone slate roof with coped gables and kneelers. There are two storeys, a double-pile plan, and eight bays. On the front are two doorways with monolithic jambs, and chamfered surrounds that rise to form false ogee lintels, and at the rear are three doorways with monolithic jambs. On the front are cross-windows, and above the left doorway is an upright oval window. At the rear, some windows are mullioned and others are cross windows. |
| Barn, Cullingworth Fields Farm; 53.82889°N 1.91078°W | — | 1701 | The barn is in gritstone with quoins, a stone slate roof with coped gables and kneelers, and five bays. On the front is a segmental-arched cart entry with composite jambs, a dated plaque above, an arched arrow-slit vent to the left, and various square openings. At the rear is a doorway with a chamfered surround, and in the left return is a doorway with a chamfered surround, a quoined lintel, and an arched vent. |
| 17 and 19 Station Road; 53.82782°N 1.90081°W | — | Early 18th century | A stone house converted into two cottages, they have quoins, a stone slate roof, two storeys, and three bays. The windows are mullioned, with four lights in the ground floor and three in the upper floor. The doorways have simple triangular pediments. The doorway of No. 17 has interrupted jambs, and the doorway of No. 19 has a lintel with a chamfered edge. |
| Cliffe House Farmhouse and barn 53.83317°N 1.91781°W | — | 1734 | The barn was added later to the farmhouse. The buildings are in stone, and they have stone slate roofs with coped gables. The house has two storeys and three bays. On the front is a gabled porch above which is a dated circular window with a moulded surround, and the other windows are mullioned. The barn contains a segmental-arched cart entry and slit vents. |
| 30 Station Road; 53.82785°N 1.89978°W | — | Early to mid 18th century | A stone house with quoins, and a stone slate roof with a coped gable on the right. There are two storeys, a double-depth plan, and two bays, and the windows are mullioned. |
| The Nook; 53.82521°N 1.89595°W | — | 1735 | A house that was extended and altered at the rear in the 19th century, it is in stone with quoins, a moulded string course, and a stone slate roof. There are two storeys, a double-depth plan, and three bays. The central doorway has a moulded surround and tie-stone jambs, and above it is a circular dated and initialled window. The outer bays contain mullioned windows. The rear is symmetrical, with a central Doric porch and sash windows. |
| Town End Farmhouse; 53.82809°N 1.90009°W | — | Mid 18th century (probable) | A stone cottage that has a stone slate roof with coped gables and kneelers. There are two storeys, a double-depth plan, and one bay. The windows are mullioned, with four lights in the upper floor and two in the ground floor. |
| 37 Manywells Brow; 53.82305°N 1.90023°W | — | Mid to late 18th century | A pair of stone back to back houses, with quoins, and a stone slate roof with a coped gable and kneelers on the right. There are two storeys and two bays. The doorways have monolithic jambs, the windows are mullioned with some mullions removed, and there is a single sash window. |
| Hunter Hill Farmhouse; 53.83666°N 1.89013°W | — | Mid to late 18th century | A stone house on a plinth, with quoins, a moulded band, and a stone slate roof with coped gables and kneelers. There are two storeys and a symmetrical front of five bays. The doorways have chamfered surrounds and monolithic jambs. The windows are mullioned, and at the rear is a stair cross window. |
| 14 and 14A Station Road; 53.82769°N 1.90034°W | — | Late 18th century | A pair of stone cottages that have a stone slate roof with coped gables and kneelers. There are two storeys, a double-depth plan, and each cottage has two bays. The doorways have tie-stone jambs, and the left cottage has a gabled porch. The windows are mullioned, and each cottage has four-light window in the ground floor, and a two-light and a three-light window in the upper floor. |
| 26 and 28 Station Road; 53.82784°N 1.89990°W | — | Late 18th century | A pair of stone cottages with quoins, and a stone slate roof with coped gables and kneelers. There are two storeys, a double-depth plan, and each cottage has two bays. The windows are mullioned, and the right cottage has a gabled porch. |
| Wesleyan Methodist Chapel; 53.82778°N 1.89844°W | | 1824 | The chapel, which has been converted for residential use, is in stone with an eaves band, and a hipped stone slate roof. There are two storeys and a symmetrical front of five bays. On the front are two doorways with tie-stone jambs and cornices on consoles. The windows have semicircular-arched heads and voussoirs. Above the middle window in the ground floor is a sundial dated 1834, with an inscription, and under the eaves is a rectangular date plaque. |
| Barn north of 5 Station Road; 53.82838°N 1.89975°W | — | Early 19th century (probable) | A stone barn that has a stone slate roof with coped gables and kneelers. There are four or five bays, and the barn contains a segmental-arched cart entry with an inner doorway. To the right is a doorway with tie-stone jambs, and under the eaves are five arched vents. |
| 16 and 18 Station Road; 53.82774°N 1.90021°W | — | Early to mid 19th century| | A pair of stone cottages with a stone slate roof. There are two storeys, a double-depth plan, and each cottage has two bays. The doorways have monolithic jambs, and the windows are mullioned, with some mullions removed. |
| Cullingworth Baptist Church; 53.82660°N 1.89928°W | | 1837 | The church, which has been altered, is in stone on a plinth, with an impost band, and a Welsh blue slate roof. There are two storeys, and the entrance front is pedimented with three bays. The central doorway has engaged Ionic columns, an entablature, and a dentilled cornice, and the ground floor windows have architraves and cornices. In the middle of the upper storey is a Venetian window with a triple keystone, in the outer bays are round-arched windows, and in the tympanum of the pediment is an oval plaque. Along the sides of the church are round-arched windows, and in the left return is a doorway with monolithic jambs. |
| Wall, railings and gates, Cullingworth Baptist Church; 53.82663°N 1.89873°W | — | c. 1837 | Enclosing the churchyard are coped stone walls with railings added in about 1900. The gates are in wrought and cast iron and have spear-head rails. |
| St John's Church; 53.82844°N 1.89918°W | | 1851–53 | The church is in stone with a Westmorland green slate roof, and is in Early English style. It has a cruciform plan, consisting of a nave, north and south transepts, a chancel with a semi-octagonal apse, and a south steeple. The steeple has a tower with a south porch, a stair tower on the west, a clock face, and an octagonal broach spire with lucarnes. The west window has five lights. |
| War memorial 53.82732°N 1.89817°W | | 1924 | The war memorial stands in a memorial garden. The memorial is in limestone, and consists of a tall slightly tapering shaft, with an architrave, a frieze with a dentil band, and a projecting cornice. It stands on a base of three steps, and at the top of the west face is a laurel wreath and flags carved in relief. Each face contains a rectangular tablet, and each tablet has inscriptions, including the names of those lost in the two World Wars. The garden is entered by steps flanked by rectangular piers, with the side entrances flanked by conical piers. The garden is enclosed by dwarf walls with cast iron posts and two-bar railings. |
