= STRI Group =

Research site in West Yorkshire, England

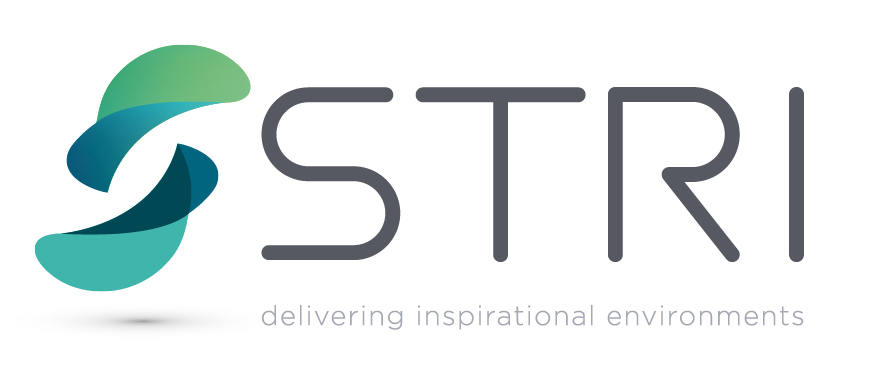
- Formation: 1929
- Founded at: Bingley St Ives
- Headquarters: Bingley St Ives
- Coordinates: 53.8475°N 1.8577°W
- Chief Executive Officer (CEO): Mark Godfrey
- Staff: 126 (2025)
- Website: strigroup.com
- Formerly called: Sports Turf Research Institute

STRI Group (formerly the Sports Turf Research Institute) is headquartered at a 10 hectares (25 acres) research site on the St Ives Estate near Bingley, UK.

The Sports Turf Research Institute was originally established in 1929 as The Board of Greenkeeping, with a grant of £303 from The Royal and Ancient Golf Club of St Andrews. This was only the second greenkeeping research station in the world and was founded as a non-profit trust.

Post World War II, the business changed its name to the Sports Turf Research Institute (STRI), allowing for more formal research and consultancy practices into all types of natural turf sport surfaces.
