= Cullingworth =

Village and civil parish in West Yorkshire, England

Coordinates: 53.824730°N 1.902738°W

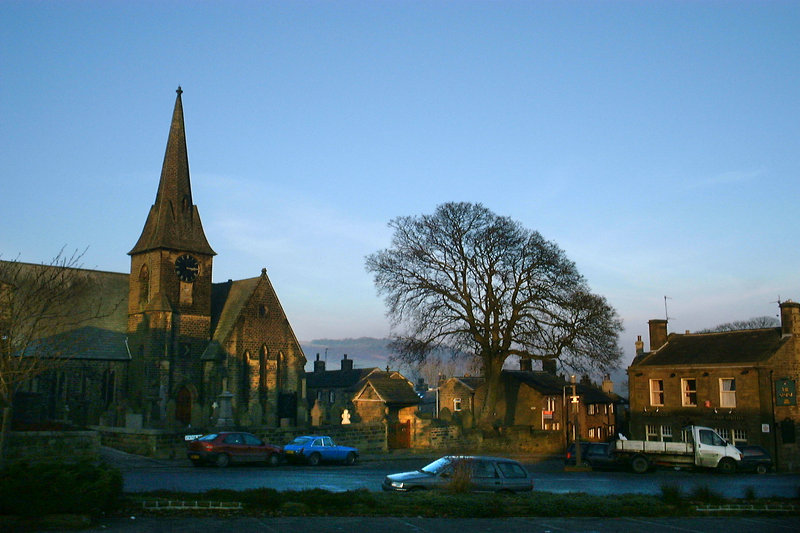
- Church Street, Cullingworth

- Location within West Yorkshire
- Population: 2,932 (2011 census)
- OS grid reference: SE065365
  - London: 175 mi (282 km) SSE
- Civil parish: Cullingworth
- Metropolitan borough: City of Bradford
- Metropolitan county: West Yorkshire
- Region: Yorkshire and the Humber
- Country: England
- Sovereign state: United Kingdom
- Post town: BRADFORD
- Postcode district: BD13
- Dialling code: 01535
- Police: West Yorkshire
- Fire: West Yorkshire
- Ambulance: Yorkshire
- UK Parliament: Shipley

Cullingworth is a village and civil parish in the City of Bradford, West Yorkshire, England. Within the boundaries of the historic West Riding of Yorkshire, it is 7 miles (11 km) west of Bradford and 3 miles (5 km) south of Keighley. The surrounding countryside is mainly used for sheep and cattle farming, with areas of moorland lying to the north and west.

The village has undergone expansion in recent years, including a new primary school and housing estates. Cullingworth is now a popular commuter settlement serving the nearby towns of Keighley, Bradford and Halifax. The village had a population of 2,932 at the 2011 Census.

== Geography ==
Cullingworth is in the eastern foothills of the South Pennines. Manywells Beck flows through the village, leading into Harden Beck, a small tributary of the River Aire. Cullingworth has a maritime climate, similar to the rest of Britain.

== Governance ==
Cullingworth is a civil parish with a parish council. It is in the Bingley Rural ward of the metropolitan borough of City of Bradford and the Shipley constituency of the British Parliament.

== Education ==
Parkside School educates approximately 1,200 local pupils from Cullingworth and the surrounding villages of Wilsden, Denholme, Thornton and Harden. Cullingworth Village Primary School, which gained a new school building in 2004, educates local primary school children. Cullingworth Preschool cares for and educates young children operating from Cullingworth Village Hall. The Preschool is rated Outstanding by Ofsted.

== Transport ==
Cullingworth is situated at the crossroads of the B6144 and B6429. The village was formerly served by a railway station on the Queensbury Lines of the Great Northern Railway. A stone built viaduct crosses the western end of the village and Hewenden Viaduct lies outside the village to the east. The former railway line route is now part of the National Cycle Network, regional route 69, known as The Great Northern Railway Trail. The nearest railway stations are now Keighley and Bingley. Cullingworth is served by regular bus services to Keighley and Bradford, and less frequent services to Bingley and Wilsden, operated by Keighley Bus Company. An infrequent Sunday service provided a link to Halifax, operated by First West Yorkshire until being withdrawn in 2015. This was reinstated as a regular hourly service in September 2020.

== Sport ==
Cullingworth has a local cricket club that currently plays in the Halifax Cricket League. Prior to 2014 the club was a member of the Craven & District league, Cullingworth Cricket Club has 2 senior teams, junior teams and a ladies' team.

== Village Hall ==
Cullingworth has a new village hall on Mill Street which contains a nursery operating most mornings during the term time. The village hall can be rented out by visiting their website. The village has seen a large building programme of private homes. A condition imposed upon some of the housebuilding companies is that they must contribute to the upkeep, repair or pay towards the new village hall.

== See also ==
- Listed buildings in Cullingworth
- RAF Manywells Height – a First World War airfield just south east of the village.
