= Hewenden Viaduct =

Railway viaduct in West Yorkshire, England

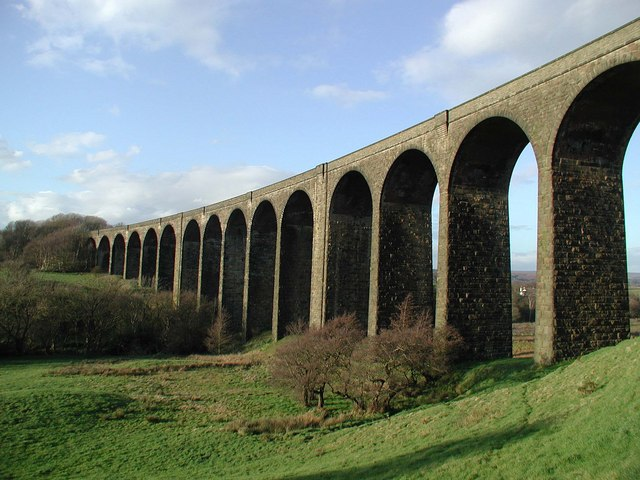
- Hewenden Viaduct
- Coordinates: 53.81848°N 1.8873°W
- OS grid reference: SE 07518 35805
- Carries: Queensbury Lines (former)
- Locale: West Yorkshire

Characteristics
- Design: Arch bridge
- Material: Brick
- No. of spans: 17

Rail characteristics
- No. of tracks: 2
- Track gauge: 4 ft 8 1/2 in (1,435 mm)

History
- Opened: July 1883
- Closed: October 1963

Location
- Interactive map of Hewenden Viaduct

Hewenden Viaduct, situated near Cullingworth, West Yorkshire, England, originally served as a railway viaduct along the Queensbury Lines. Being one of the highest viaducts in Britain, it has been recognised as a Grade II listed structure.

The viaduct was built for the Great Northern Railway to carry a new branch line between Keighley and Thornton. Soon after its official opening in July 1883, the route became of strategic importance for through goods traffic, particularly in connection with the region's extensive textile industry. However, the line's fortunes took a downturn during the twentieth century. During October 1963, the viaduct's use by railway traffic ended as a result of the line's permanently closure. Despite this, it has remained intact. Since 2005, the viaduct has formed part of the Great Northern Railway Trail, trafficked by walkers and cyclists alike.

== History ==
The origins of the Hewenden Viaduct are closely associated with the Great Northern Railway, which decided to construct the Keighley and Thornton branch line from its main route. It was recognised that such a railway represented considerable strategic importance, forming a through route that directly linked several major textile towns in the Pennine foothills whilst bypassing congested existing lines around Leeds and Bradford.

The route opted for involved several extensive engineering works, including the viaduct, contributing to the railway's colloquial nickname of the Alpine Railway. Construction of the Hewenden Viaduct commenced around 1880, being built in parallel to the neighbouring the mile-long Lees Moor Tunnel. According to English Heritage, the engineer responsible for designing the viaduct was likely the civil engineer Richard Johnson. Over a century following its construction, the viaduct is still regarded as being one of the highest viaducts anywhere in the British Isles.

It is an extensive structure, standing at a height of 123 feet (37 m) and spanning a distance of 576 yards (527 m), supported by a series of 17 arches, each being 16.5 yards (15 m) apart. Due to instability in the ground beneath the viaduct, the foundations of the piers were sunk to a depth in excess of 60 feet (18 m) to ensure that the structure would possess sufficient stability and longevity. The five central piers differ from the majority, being considerably thicker and having projecting pilaster; all piers were provided with a protective stone facing. The parapets of the viaduct featured seven projecting retreats, while abutments were located at either end of the structure.

During July 1883, the Hewenden Viaduct was officially opened to passenger trains. Goods trains along the route commenced on 1 April 1884. On 11 November 1963, the viaduct and the wider line was permanently closed to railway traffic, being amongst the many victims of the Beeching cuts.

Shortly after the withdrawal of railway traffic along the branch, the tracks were lifted across the viaduct, but the structure otherwise remained intact. Since October 1985, the Hewenden Viaduct has been recognised by English Heritage as being a Grade II listed structure. The British walking and cycling charity Sustrans successfully negotiated with the British Railways Board for a lease of the viaduct's deck for a new walking route, which was constructed in 2005. Presently, the Hewenden Viaduct is being used to carry the Great Northern Railway Trail, being accessible to both walkers and cyclists.

== See also ==
- Listed buildings in Wilsden
