= Bingley St Ives =

Country park in West Yorkshire, England

Bingley St. Ives
- St. Ives Estate
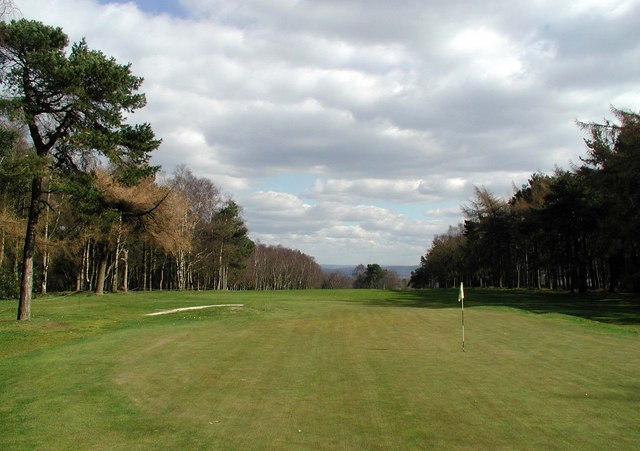
- Bingley St. Ives Golf Course
- Interactive map of Bingley St. Ives
- Type: Country Park
- Location: Harden, Bingley, West Yorkshire
- Coordinates: 53.847°N 1.860°W
- Area: 550 acres (2.2 km^{2}; 0.86 sq mi)
- Created: 1929
- Operator: City of Bradford, Parks and Landscape Services
- Visitors: 300,000 people per year
- Status: open all year round
- Website: friendsofstives.co.uk

Bingley St. Ives, or St. Ives Estate is a 550-acre (2.2 km^{2}) country park and former estate between Bingley and Harden in West Yorkshire, England now owned by Bradford Council. The park has Grade II listing in the English Heritage National Register of Historic Parks and Gardens of Special Interest. The park has been given Accredited Country Park status by Natural England.

As well as being a public country park the property is also used by Bingley St Ives Golf Club, the Sports Turf Research Institute, Bradford Independent Care Group, Bingley Angling Club, and Aire Valley Archers. Some 300,000 people per year visit the country park.

== History ==
The St. Ives area is known to have been inhabited from at least the Neolithic or Bronze Age from artifacts left behind. Until the Dissolution of the Monasteries in 1540 the land was divided between the monks of Rievaulx Abbey and Drax Priory.

In 1540, the land was purchased by a Walter Paslew, and it was subsequently owned by the Laycock and Milner families. The St. Ives mansion house was built in 1616.

In 1635, the Ferrands purchased St. Ives, at the time known as Harden Grange, and it was in 1858 that the names of Harden Grange and the local St. Ives were interchanged.

There are stories of a local connection with General Fairfax and the Civil War, regrettably little is known with certainty. Sarah Busfeild (née Ferrand) inherited St. Ives from her uncle and she and her son William changed their family name to Ferrand and, when she died in 1854 her son William Busfeild Ferrand inherited the property. The estate and mansion were bought by Bingley Urban District Council in 1929.

== Landmarks ==
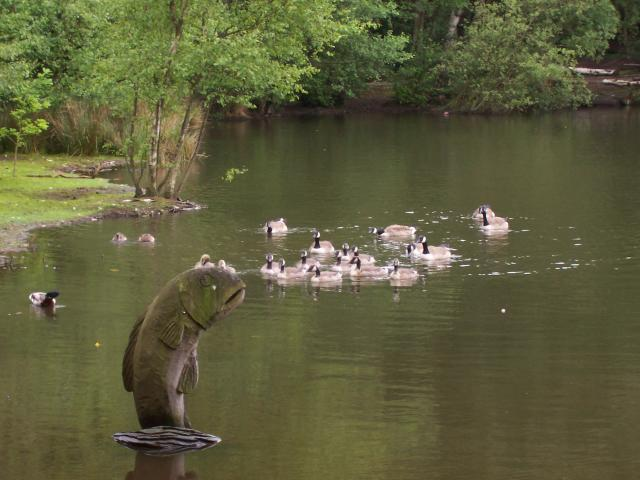
Fish sculpture on Coppice Pond

A granite obelisk close to Lady Blantyre's Rock north west of Coppice Pond commemorates the career of William Busfeild Ferrand (1809–89), a Member of Parliament, magistrate and one time owner of St. Ives Estate. Coppice Pond was built as a feed water supply for what is thought originally to be a fulling mill, later landscaped by the Ferrands and used for boating.

Today it is stocked with a variety of fish for angling and has a bird hide and duck feeding pier. On the north side of the pond is the archery club while east of Coppice Pond is the mill. A mill has been recorded on this site since the early 14th century and it is probably the oldest building on the estate, although modified since then. To the south of Coppice Pond near Cuckoo Nest Cottages is the restored (2003) Baxter's Pond, fed by both Coppice Pond and the mill. East of the mill is Home Farm with its cafe, coach house and stables, and to the rear a Dutch barn^{*} and car park.

Just north of the Dutch barn on Cross Gates Lane opposite an ice house by the golf club's clubhouse is a kidney shaped ornamental pond known as Crayfish Pond. This feeds water southwards to the ornamental Round Pond and its non-functioning fountain on St. Ives Mansion garden lawns. The Round Pond feeds the Upper Pond in Cuckoo Nest Wood in which water cascades down a millstone grit crag into a shallow lenticular pool. The Upper Pond and Baxter's Pond both feed the much larger and more easily accessible Lower Pond.

St. Ives Mansion House was formerly a nursing home for young disabled but has fallen into disrepair. As of September 2026, efforts by locals to raise awareness have yet to have an impact in restoring it. To the north of the mill has been created an indoor and outdoor equestrian riding centre for use by the disabled and the general public. Just east of the mansion house is the children's play area and toilets. To the north of this are the main offices of the Sports Turf Research Institute. On the road leading eastwards out of the estate is Betty's Lodge. Around the estate and the woods in particular, there is a sculpture trail of chainsaw carvings and these are particularly numerous in Bell Bank Wood by the car park at the east entrance. This car park has space for 56 cars and four horse boxes. There are numerous listed buildings on the estate.

The golf club was formed and opened in 1931. The course was designed by Dr Alister MacKenzie and Bobby Jones and initially had nine holes, but was extended to 18 in 1935.

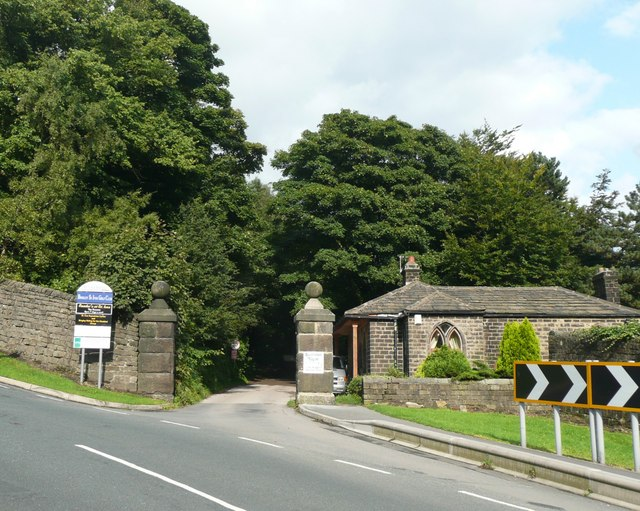
Western entrance and St. Ives Lodge

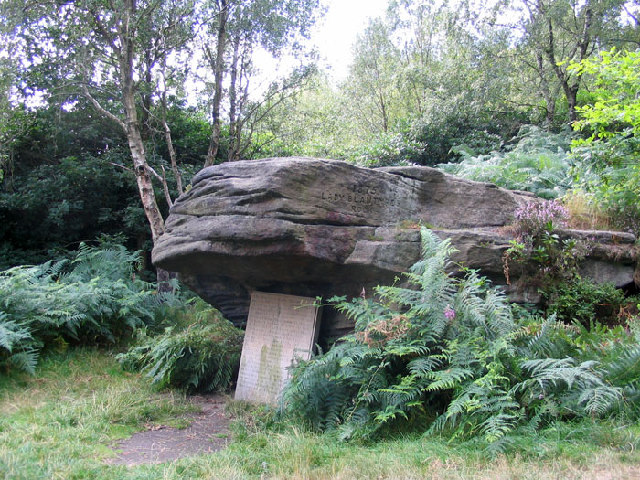
Lady Blantyre's Rock

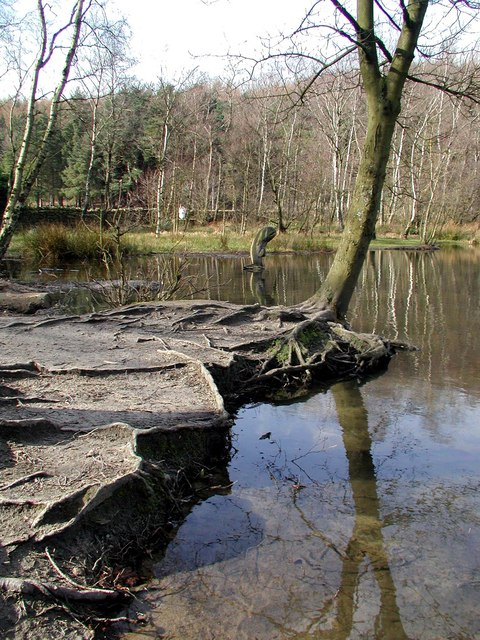
Coppice Pond

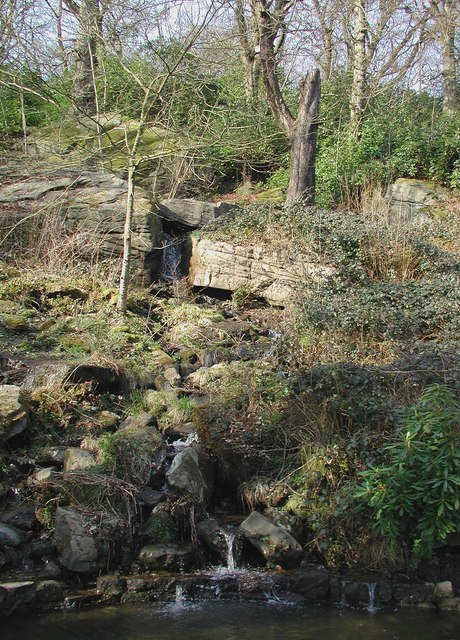
Baxter's Pond

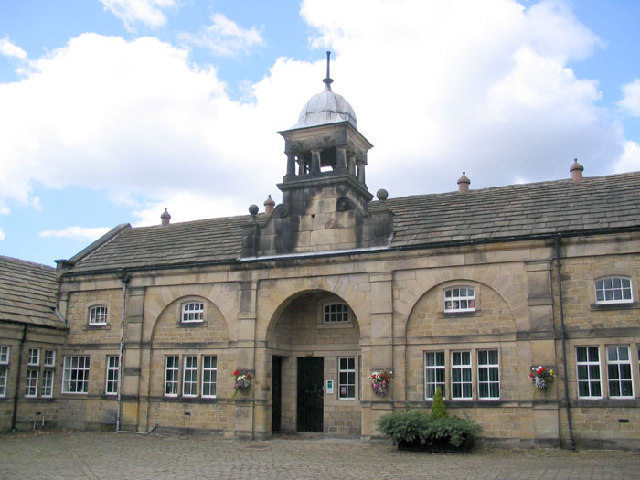
Former coach house or stable block^{*}

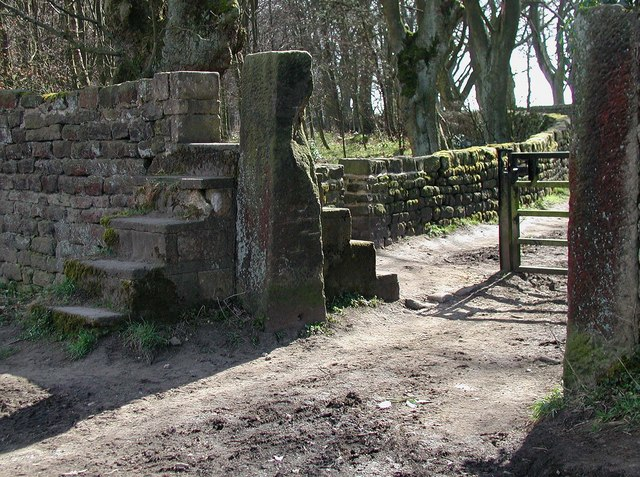
Altar Lane

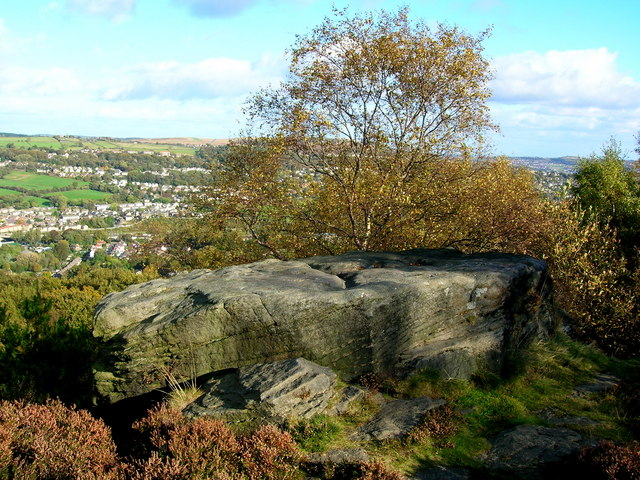
Druids Altar

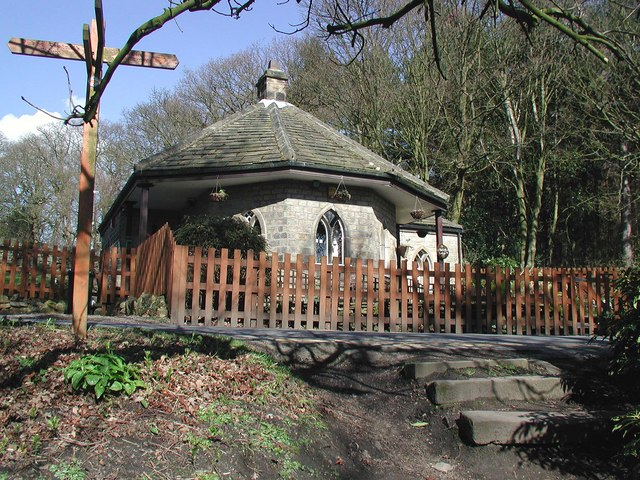
Betty's Lodge^{*}
^{*}listed building
