= Wilsden =

Village and civil parish in West Yorkshire, England

Coordinates: 53°49′N 1°52′W

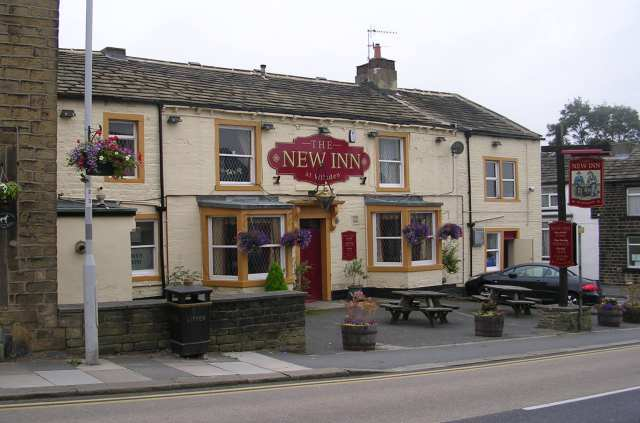
- The New Inn - Main Street, Wilsden

- Location within West Yorkshire
- Population: 4,807 (2011 census)
- Civil parish: Wilsden
- Metropolitan borough: City of Bradford
- Metropolitan county: West Yorkshire
- Region: Yorkshire and the Humber
- Country: England
- Sovereign state: United Kingdom
- Post town: Bradford
- Postcode district: BD15
- Dialling code: 01535
- Police: West Yorkshire
- Fire: West Yorkshire
- Ambulance: Yorkshire
- UK Parliament: Shipley

Wilsden is a village and civil parish in west Bradford, in West Yorkshire, England. Wilsden is 6 miles (9.7 km) west of Bradford and is close to the Aire Valley and the nearby villages of Denholme, Cullingworth, Harden, Cottingley and Allerton. Wilsden re-acquired civil parish status in 2004. The 2001 census revealed a population of 3,697, increasing to 4,807 at the 2011 Census.

== History ==
During the Roman era, the area was part of the Ancient British (Celtic) kingdom of Elmet. A connection to the original British tribes of the area may have been included in the name of the village; Wilsden is an Old English name and was originally recorded as Wealhas-den, which has been interpreted as "place of the Welsh". Since all speakers of Brittonic languages were known as "Welsh" in Old English, the name may have implied that Wilsden was a place that Britons retreated to, after Anglo-Saxon settlers arrived in the Aire Valley.

The village is mentioned in the Domesday Book as belonging to Gamalbarn and was part of the manor known as Allerton-cum-Wilsden.

A map of 1818, shows Wilsden Hill, Wilsden and Lingbob as being three separate and distinct hamlets. Industrialisation led to the building of mills in the village, the first of which, Albion Mill, was built in 1810 with a further seven following in the same century. Albion Mill was demolished after it suffered a serious fire in 1990.

The church of St Matthew was built in Wilsden in 1826 and was identical to the Church of St Paul in Shipley. The church was demolished in 1962 and ten years later, a modern St Matthew's church was built in a different location in the village.

In 1886, a railway station was opened on the Queensbury to Keighley line that ran to the west of the village. The station was actually in the hamlet of Harecroft, 2 miles (3.2 km) away, and was closed down in May 1955 to passengers and November 1963 to goods. The 616 and 619 bus services connect the village with Harden, Bingley and Eldwick to the north and with Allerton and Bradford to the south. The main road that runs north–south through the village is an unclassified road but connects at the southern end with the B6144 road towards Cullingworth and Bradford, and at the northern end goes through Harden to connect with the B6429 towards Bingley.

Wilsden has many businesses such as Wilsden Autos, Suite Centre, a Co-op and a post office.

The village occupies the high ground to the west of the Aire Valley and is surrounded by upland pastures, enclosed areas, wooded valleys and gritstone moorland.

The Ling Bob public house was built to the south of the village in 1836 and was originally known as the Brown Cow Inn. It was situated in the hamlet of Ling Bob, which was separate from the village of Wilsden at that time, however, the locals all knew the pub as the Ling Bob, so the name stuck.

== Wilsden Village Hall ==
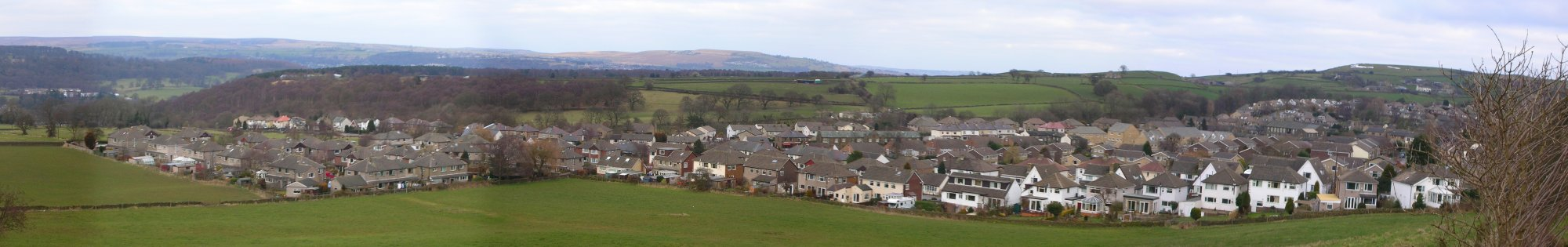
Panoramic view over Wilsden

Wilsden village hall holds many groups such as scouting groups, walking group, a weekly auction, a pre-school and others.

Administratively, it is part of the Bingley Rural ward of the City of Bradford and part of the Shipley constituency.

== Elvis the Macaw ==
Wilsden was home to a South American Macaw named Elvis from 2008 to 2009. The bird was famous in the village for diving at residents, stealing metal from structures, and for his bright colors. After Elvis scared a 3-year old, however, the bird was relocated to rural Shropshire.

== Notable people ==
- Alfred Fowler, Astronomer was born in the village

== See also ==
- Listed buildings in Wilsden
