= Harden, West Yorkshire =

Village in West Yorkshire, England

Coordinates: 53.83°N 1.86°W

Harden
- Location within West Yorkshire
- Population: 1,900 (2011 Census)
- OS grid reference: SE0838
- Civil parish: Harden
- Metropolitan borough: City of Bradford
- Metropolitan county: West Yorkshire
- Region: Yorkshire and the Humber
- Country: England
- Sovereign state: United Kingdom
- Post town: BINGLEY
- Postcode district: BD16
- Dialling code: 01535
- Police: West Yorkshire
- Fire: West Yorkshire
- Ambulance: Yorkshire

Harden is a civil parish and village within the City of Bradford Metropolitan District, West Yorkshire, England, 2 miles (3.2 km) west of Bingley. It had a population of 1,615 in the 2001 census, but by 2011 this had risen to 1,900.

== History ==
=== Roman ===
Excavations on Leech Lane, off Hill End towards Cullingworth, have suggested Roman settlement in the area from c. 150 AD. Archaeologists have in the past unearthed pottery, coins and even elephant ivory on this site, suggesting that an Anglo-Roman villa may have stood here.

There is a small section of Roman Road on Harden Moor which points in a rough north east direction. The route is lined with stones that have deep cart-groove marks.

=== Industrial ===
Between 1960 and 1997, Harden's biggest employer was Ellison Circlips. The huge factory adjoined another smaller factory producing similar products. On 24 February 1979, Ellison's Mill caught fire in the computer room and the resultant blaze gutted the timber floored mill. The outer stone walls stayed upright during the fire, but because of the threat of explosions from the acid baths if they came into contact with water, two houses were evacuated as a precaution.

The factories were bounded on the south by Long Lane (the B6429) on the east by Keighley Road, on the west by Effingham Road and the north by fields leading up to Harden Moor. The company relocated to Glusburn in 1997 and the factory was demolished to make way for housing.

At least two other mills were in operation in Harden, both situated alongside Harden Beck to the south of the village. One of the mills is still there and now operates as a printing works. The other mill was further upstream from the existing mill and during the early part of the 20th century was turned into a café and ballroom. It was destroyed by fire in 1927.

=== Artistic ===
Woodbank, an area to the east of Harden and south of the B6429, played host to some of the Pre-Raphaelite movement. Many of the stained glass works around Bingley, Bradford and Silsden (including the Church of All Saints, Bingley) were designed by Burne-Jones.

== Facilities ==
Harden has two churches, one Congregational and the other one is St Saviours Church in the newly created benefice of Cullingworth, Denholme, Harden & Wilsden. Harden Primary School has been in existence since 1877 and the school still uses some of the Victorian buildings to this day.

There is also a Post Office, a convenience store, a garden centre and an independent butcher's. There is a village park which contains a large square piece of land that hosts the annual gala during the summer. Harden is the location of the St. Ive's Estate, a large stretch of land with woodland and a well-equipped children's playpark, as well as paths up to moorland. St Ive's also contains an 18-hole golf course and golf club. There is a beautician and a hairdresser in Long Lane, opposite Harden Primary School's car park. Harden has an establishment which holds drama plays every year, it is located in the centre of Harden.

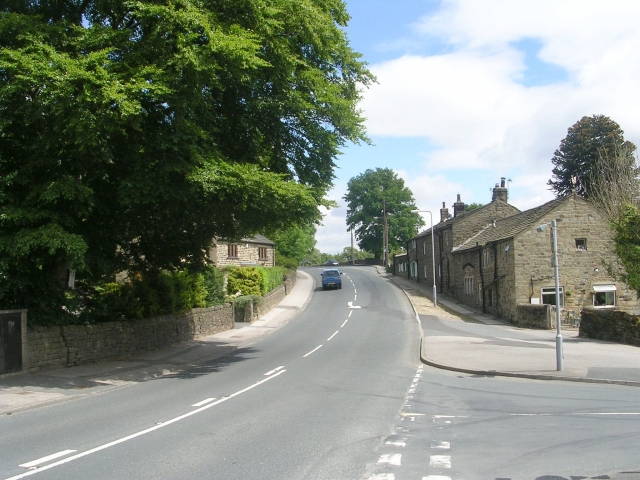
Harden Road in the village of Harden looking east towards Bingley

Harden has a cricket club which has been in existence since at least 1950. They play matches on a pitch adjacent to the hamlet of Cuckoo's Nest on the east side of Harden village.

Harden and District WI is based in Harden. It was formed in 1962 and meets monthly on the 2nd Monday in the Family Room of St Saviour's Church.

== Transport ==
First Bradford buses run from Bradford Interchange to Bingley through the village. The service, number 616, goes from Bradford through Four Lane Ends, Allerton, Sandy Lane Cross Roads, Wilsden and then into Harden before going on into Bingley. There is a half-hourly service through the day Mondays to Saturdays with additions in the peaks. Sundays sees an hourly service. Most evening services extend into Eldwick (along the route of the 615) and also start their journeys back from there.

Keighley Bus Company provide the service K7 which goes from Keighley to Cullingworth via East Morton, Bingley Railway station, and into Harden village.

== Events ==
Harden Gala

There is an annual gala in Harden park in the summer, which has races, jokes and a parade processing down Long Lane past the school and the church. The parade generally consists of themed floats from the Harden Players' (a local drama club and the primary school) and then the gala queen's float with her two attendants, all dressed up in evening wear with bouquets of flowers. A marching band leads the procession and Harden pre-school brings up the rear in costume.

Harden & District WI have a stall selling homemade cakes, plants and produce.

Harden Show

Every September the Harden Beck Horticultural Society hold a show between the Golden Fleece public house and the former dam area. The society and show have been in existence for over 50 years.

Harden Players

Harden Players is a local drama club that puts on productions roughly twice a year, with children and adults, ages ranging from 4 to about 54. In recent years they have presented enjoyable pantomimes as well as Macbeth.

== Media ==
A few short shots of footage of Harden are available on the British Film Institute (BFI) website on the BFI Player along with footage of the 1968 Miss Blackpool Beauty Contest. The whole short appears to have been filmed in 1968 and shows a shot of the Malt Shovel where Harden and Wilsden meet, the parade of shops with the Post Office and Snowdon's Butcher's shop, part of Wilsden Road and a shot of the weir at the bottom of Harden Road in Bingley.

== Notable people ==
- Allan Wicks – celebrated organist, was born in the village in 1923

== See also ==
- Listed buildings in Harden, West Yorkshire
