= Bradford Dale (Yorkshire) =

Valley in West Yorkshire, England

- Bradfordale
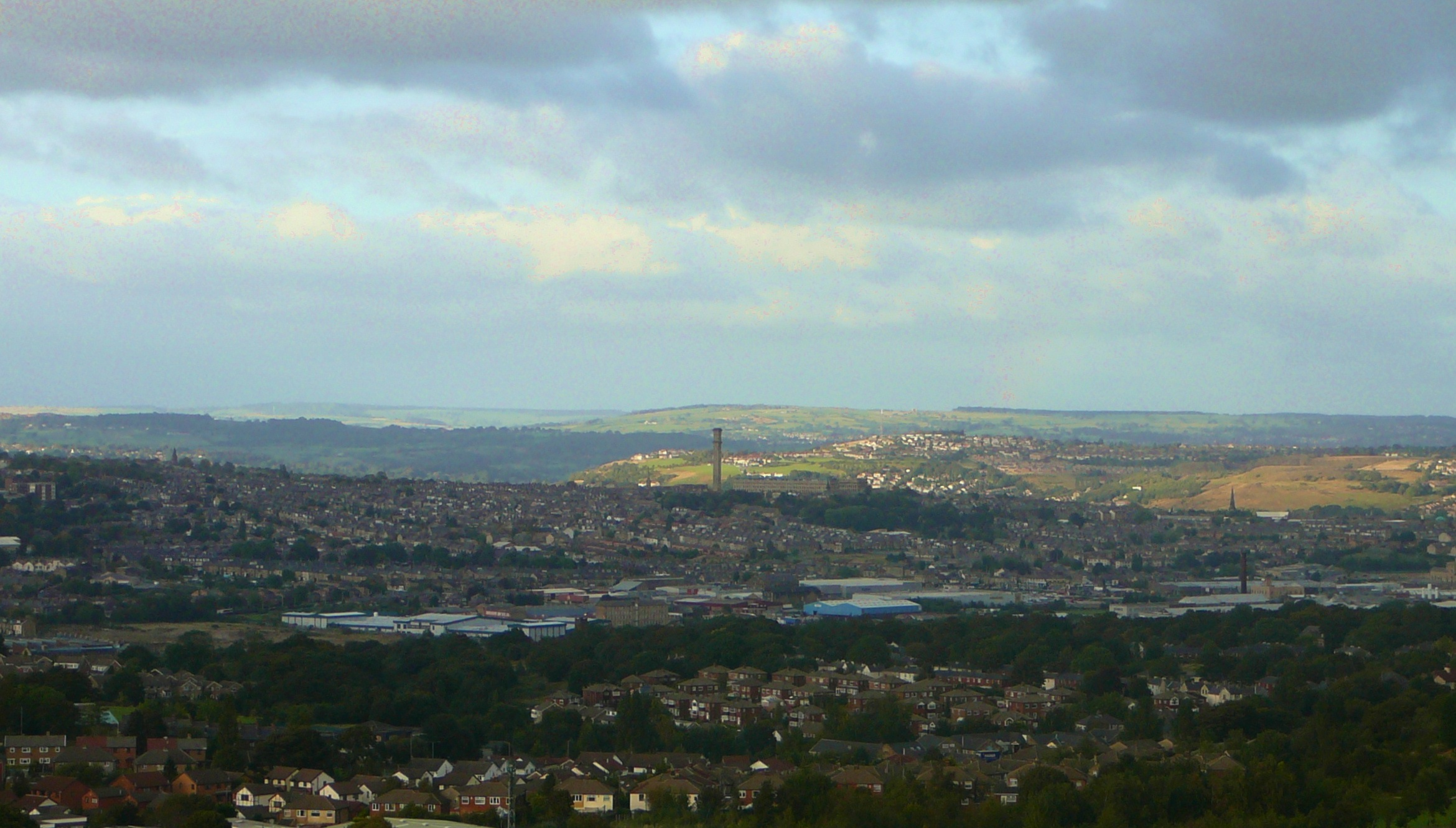
- An image looking north eastwards across Bradford and Bradford Dale. The dale extends across the middle foreground from left to right (where the warehouses are) and then changes direction to go back to the left around Manningham Mills (the very tall chimney in the middle). The steep sides of Airedale are the hillsides in the distance

- Location within England

- Location within England
- Floor elevation: 85 m (279 ft)
- Length: 8 mi (13 km) East–north
- Width: 6 mi (9.7 km) East–west (Note: This is at its widest point, between Bradford and Shipley, but takes into account the high ground as well as the valley floor.)

Geography
- Location: City of Bradford
- Country: England
- State/Province: Yorkshire and the Humber
- Coordinates: 53.7940°N 1.7632°W
- River: Bradford Beck

Bradford Dale (or Bradfordale), is a side valley of Airedale that feeds water from Bradford Beck across the City of Bradford into the River Aire at Shipley in West Yorkshire, England. Whilst it is in Yorkshire and a dale, it is not part of the Yorkshire Dales and has more in common with Lower Nidderdale and Lower Airedale for its industrialisation.

Before the expansion of Bradford, the dale was a collection of settlements surrounded by woods. When the wool and worsted industries in the dale were mechanized in the Industrial Revolution, the increasing population resulted in an urban sprawl that meant these individual communities largely disappeared as Bradford grew, and in 1897, the town of Bradford became a city. Since most settlements became suburbs of the City of Bradford, the term Bradford Dale has become archaic and has fallen into disuse, though it is sometimes used to refer to the flat section of land northwards from Bradford City Centre towards Shipley.

The woollen and worsted industries had a profound effect on the dale, the later City of Bradford and the wider region. The geological conditions in the valley also allowed some coal mining to take place, but a greater emphasis was upon the noted stone found on the valley floor (Elland Flags and Gaisby Rock), which as a hard sandstone, was found to be good for buildings and in use as a harbour stone due to its natural resistance to water.

The dale is notable for the lack of a main river (Bradford Beck being only a small watercourse in comparison to the rivers Wharfe, Aire, Calder and Don) and necessitated the importation of clean water into the dale from as afar afield as Nidderdale. Most of the becks in the city centre have now been culverted and have suffered with pollution from the heavy woollen industry in the dale.

== History ==
Bradford Dale was described as being

...a natural basin 6 miles (9.7 km) to 8 miles (13 km) across, on the eastern slopes of the Pennines with only one level output - northwards to the [River] Aire at Shipley.

The valley that the Bradford Beck flows through was known variously as Bradforddale, Bradford-dale, Bradfordale, Bradford Dale, Bradeffordale and Broadfordesdale. (Note: Literally all meaning The valley in which Bradford stands.) (Note: Most maps and references list it as Bradford Dale; maps drawn by Jeffreys in 1775 list the valley of the Pinch and Clayton Becks (Thornton and Clayton) as being Bradford Dale.) The City of Bradford, which takes its name through the derivation of Broad Ford (across the Bradford Beck) was not formalised as a city until 1897. (Note: Bradford achieved borough status in 1847.) Previous to the industrial Revolution, the dale was the name that united the various communities that were situated within it, and also of some on the outer edges. Places such as Allerton, Bolton and Manningham were settlements in their own right; the Parish of Manningham stretched from Chellow Dean Beck in the west to the Bradford Beck in the east. Only since the institution of Bradford as a city at the end of the 19th century did these settlements become suburbs of Bradford, and so were referred to as being in Bradford rather than Bradford Dale. (Note: In much the same way as the small town of Grassington in North Yorkshire is sometimes described as being in Wharfedale.) Bradford Dale is not one of the Yorkshire Dales, though it was surrounded by high ground on three sides with water flowing down the valley. Its industrialisation has led to it being compared with Nidderdale and Airedale as a "partly industrialised Yorkshire Valley". The term Bradford Dale is sometimes still used to describe the section of valley between Bradford and Shipley, but this is also more commonly known as the Bradford to Shipley Corridor.

The valley of the River Aire was covered in a huge lake named Lake Bradford towards the end of the last ice age. This lake was fed by the meltwaters running through Cottingley, Harden, Keighley and Bradford (which was combined of several becks). Backfilling of water also created lakes further up in Bradford Dale; one at Fairweather Green was estimated by Kendall to be at least 525 feet (160 m) deep. Additionally, water would sometimes reach such heights as to escape naturally away from its traditional route northwards through Bradford Dale. When the Leeds, Bradford and Halifax Junction Railway pushed their railway through Laisterdyke in the east of Bradford, some commented on the cutting that the route took. Kendall claims that this was a natural cutting carved by water spilling over to the south east from the glacial lakes across the area.

When the waters receded, the valley of Bradford Dale was settled first by Palaeolithic then Mesolithic man, who became hunter-gatherers in the wooded valley. When the Romans arrived in Great Britain, the valley was populated with first the Brigantes who eventually gave way to the Anglo-Saxons. This pushed the Celtic peoples to the edges of Bradford Dale (Eccleshill and Wilsden), but also brought Christianity to the area, and when the Church of St Peter was built in what is now Bradford city centre, it was sometimes referred to as St Peters in Bradfordale [sic]. The church was only elevated to cathedral status in 1919 by an order signed by King George V, when the Diocese of Bradford was created. St Peters was built as an ordinary 15th century parish church to serve a local community in, what was until the 18th century, the small town of Bradford. (Note: The church was built in the 15th century, though it stands on the site of a previous Anglo-Saxon place of worship. As it was just east of the town centre and surrounded by woodland, the church was also known as chapel i' th' wood (chapel in the wood).)

The dale was referred to as vallis dé Bradford in the 13th century written Testa de Nevill. In the 14th century, the dale was dotted with cloth-fulling enterprises but the arrival of the Black Death deprived the dale of a third of its inhabitants through the disease. In the same century, further outbreaks of various plagues in 1362 and 1369 and the marauding of the valley by Scots raiders, caused mass migration from the dale, which until that point had seen immigration. In 1642, during the English Civil War, wool bales were hung from the church to protect it from cannon fire and the parish was besieged a year later. The civil wars in the 17th century played little part in the development of the dale, but Bradford suffered afterwards in what was seen as punishment by the monarchy for supporting the Parliamentarian cause. Some actually stated that a period of 50 years of "impeded trade" elapsed which had allowed nearby Leeds to prosper at the expense of Bradford. By the end of that century, wool farming was becoming popular with agriculture being undertaken in the warmer months and wool processing in the colder parts of the year.

By the end of the 18th century, the population of Bradford town numbered less than 3,000 inhabitants and the focus in the area was on agriculture with traditional wool working. At the turn of the 19th century, a map shows Bradford to still be a small market town with all of its becks and streams in the open air. Most of the town is clustered on the north side of Bradford Beck with just two bridges across the beck and the church to the east with no development around it. By the middle of the 19th century, the population of the town had risen to 4,000. In the second half of the 19th century and the early part of the 20th, the lower reaches of the dale, especially its eastern edge and central section were worked intensively. Coal mining, quarrying and the installation of a canal, turnpike roads and the railway into Forster Square railway station, stripped this part of the dale of its many woodlands. The rise of the woollen trade, especially in the many new mills in the dale, had increased the population to over 100,000 by 1861, making Bradford the ninth largest town in England. By the 1860s, the area around Manningham was still quite scenic and had "pleasant surroundings". The opening of a railway station at Manningham in 1868, precipitated a huge shift in industry and population; in 1871 the census stated that the population of Manningham was just under 20,000, by 1881 that was at 37,000.

The Borough of Bradford was created in 1847, adopting the motto of Labor Omnia Vincit (Latin: Work Conquers All) (known locally as Where there's muck, there's money). This motto was kept when Bradford became a city in 1897.

== Transport and water ==
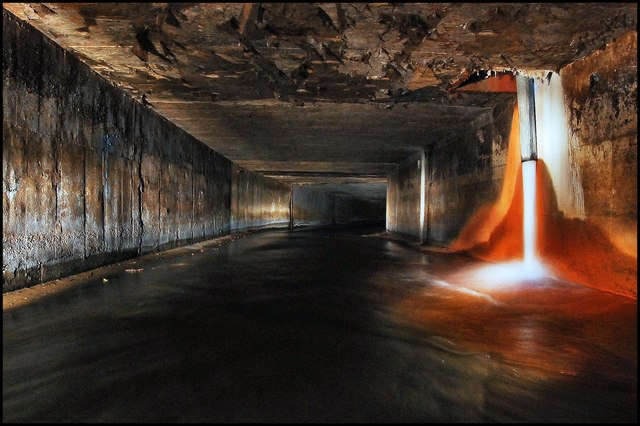
Bradford Beck under Broadway shopping centre

The City of Bradford developed over some time and sits in a natural bowl with hills to the west, south and east that rise to 1,200 feet (370 m) above sea level. Lewis describes the town of Bradford in 1848 as being "pleasantly situated at the junction of three fertile valleys". The immediate east and south east was moorland until comparatively recently, with names such as Bradford Moor indicating the true nature of the land. Several streams feed into the city (Pitty Beck, Pinch Beck, Hole Bottom Beck, Clayton Beck, Horton Beck, Chellow Dean Beck and two smaller ones near to the city centre) and merge in the city centre leaving Bradford flowing northwards as Bradford Beck. These waters that feed Bradford Beck, along with the geological conditions, formed Bradford Dale. The catchment area for the dale covers over 24 square miles (62 km^{2}).

As the industrialisation of Bradford was some time off from the Middle Ages, many locations and settlements were not listed as being in Bradford itself, which was quite small, but in Bradford Dale. Bradford Dale has been described as starting above the moors at Thornton, heading east and then curving northwards towards Shipley following the course of the Bradford Beck, with Shipley being described as the head of the dale where the waters from Bradford Beck meet the River Aire. It was along this low land from Shipley to Bradford that a canal (the Bradford Canal) and the first railway to reach Bradford were sited as it was almost level and the low lying land made it ideal for engineering purposes. The same journey in the late 20th century was described as;

[being] through semi-industrial scenery, past the premises of worsted spinners and fellmongers.

Bradford has no major source of water unlike other cities and towns its size in the area, and clean, fresh water was required to wash the wool before spinning and for human consumption. Additionally, water was required to power steam engines in the dale; in 1848 there were 38 mills in the town of Bradford (112 across the parish) and 88 steam engines to power the mills themselves. As far back as 1790, various individuals with money and certain enterprises had joined together to establish a company which could bring fresh water into the town of Bradford from outside its immediate environs. A spring was dammed and had a pipeline installed at Wibsey, which in turn fed a reservoir along Westgate which was capable of holding 15,000 imperial gallons (68,000 L; 18,000 US gal). Bradford Dale only had the Bradford Beck running through it which was seriously polluted. The Bradford Canal was also badly afflicted with pollutants; at one point, the sulphuretted hydrogen bubbling up through the canal's surface allowed it to be set on fire. This prompted the Bradford Corporation to purchase the Bradford Water Company and import water into the dale by the use of the Nidd Aqueduct. Other water schemes are in place with several reservoirs on the moors to the west feeding water into the system. The reservoirs at Chellow Dean receive water from the Nidd Aqueduct, but also took water from Manywells Spring in Cullingworth. The corporation also installed a sewage plant at Frizinghall, but this proved not to be capable enough to deal with the wastewater needs of the woollen industry and so a pipe was installed from the Frizinghall works to a new plant at Esholt in Airedale.

As the industrialisation of the valley progressed, so too did the pollution in the air. By 1847, a stipulation had been laid down in local bye-laws that all chimneys must be at least 90 feet (27 m) in height to help progress smoke out of Bradford Dale. Even then "these chimneys belched out large quantities of smoke, ash, sulphur and other irritants into the atmosphere of Bradford Dale....during still-air conditions, especially in winter, polluted air was trapped in the basin-shaped valley of the Bradford Beck, and killing 'pea-soup fogs' used to occur."

Modern Bradford Dale has many roads through it; the A647 and the B6145 travel on either side of the small valley that starts off Bradford Dale to the west with Pinch Beck (Thornton Viaduct straddles this small valley too). From the city centre, the A6037 and the A650 run northwards through the low ground of Bradford Dale to Shipley and then beyond. The Bradford to Thornton and the Keighley to Halifax railways (popularly known as the Queensbury Lines), travelled up the western edge of the dale and were always known as the "Alpine Lines" due to the steep and hilly nature of the railway's course. Railway transport to the south and east joined at Bradford Exchange (now Bradford Interchange) with goods coming in to Adolphus Street. The lines to the north were served at first by Market Street, then Bradford Forster Square. The lack of line straight through Bradford (instead of its two end to end stations) has, according to some, hampered its efforts to improve is business and social mobility. The difference in elevation between Forster Square and Interchange stations (70 feet (21 m)) has proved to be the biggest stumbling block and several Bradford Crossrail schemes have been mooted since the railways first arrived in the dale. Plans have been announced to install a central station on a through line in Bradford if HS3 is built.

== Geology ==
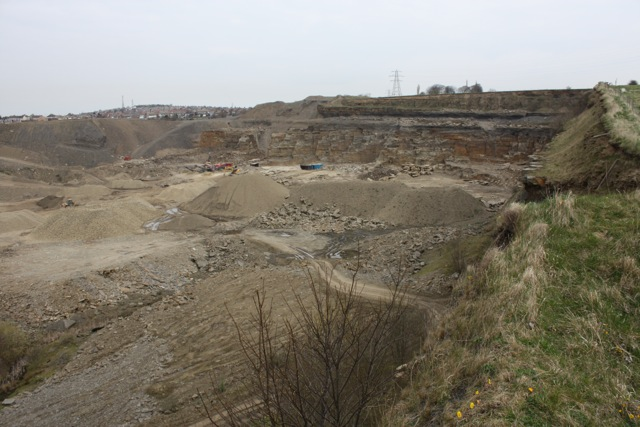
Bolton Woods Quarry

Bradford Dale consists largely of coal measures (of the Pennine Lower Coal Measures Formation) with hard sandstone beds in certain areas. The hard millstone grit which is renowned across the north becomes more widespread further up the Aire Valley, but certain areas within Bradford Dale were good locations for sandstone flags, such as the quarries at Bolton Woods. The quarries around Bolton Woods were known for producing the renowned Elland Flags, which could be used as flagstone, ashlar, building stone, kerbs, roof tiles, paving stone and as a source of crushed stone. Elland Flags sandstone quarried at Bolton Woods has been used in the construction of the town halls in Bradford, Leeds and Manchester. Bolton Woods Quarry was closed in 2016 after 150 years.

Spinkwell and Cliffe Wood Quarries were located slightly nearer to Bradford than Bolton Woods. The quarries were situated between Cliffe Road and Bolton Road and were also in demand for the quality of their stone. Spinkwell especially had a particularly reliable type of stone known as Gaisby Rock (Sprinkwell Stone) which was used in Leeds University Great Hall, Wakefield Town Hall, Hull's Old Custom House and the town hall in Manchester (along with stone from Bolton Woods). Stone was also exported via the railway to the south of England to build the Woolwich Arsenal and Portsmouth Admiralty Docks. Most of the other quarries supplying building stone in the dale are to be found in the northern and western locations.

The dale is known to be at the northern edge of the Yorkshire Coalfield, which yielded coal, fireclay, ironstone, sandstone and brick clay, most of which were quarried or mined in the Bradford area and contributed to its enormous growth in the 18th and 19th centuries. In 1866, all of the collieries in the Bradford district produced a combined 1,900,000 tonnes (2,100,000 tons) of coal, most of which was used in smelting of metals. This was the peak production time and most of these workings were outside of Bradford Dale, though several workings existed around Bierley, which supplied the ironworks there. Whilst the coal north of Bradford was laid down extensively, the seams were thin and not very productive. The coal was known to be of poor quality, yet various mining ventures acquired names for their workings (Bolton Woods Coal Mine, Bunker Hill Coal Mine, etc). The cluster of coal workings south of the city around Low Moor were better equipped geologically to produce sufficient quantities of coal. In 1924, just three collieries were active in the district, though some opencasting was resurrected during the Second World War.

Coal was exported from the dale via the canal or latterly, on the railways. Coal was also worked at Thornton and near to the hamlet of Egypt (Note: Egypt was said to have derived as a name because it was founded at the time that Napoleon entered Egypt.) where it was said to be only 23 yards (21 m) down from the surface. Egypt was also the location of four fireclay quarries, which between them produced so much spoil and overburden, that huge retaining structures lining one of the roads in the hamlet were built to secure the waste product. The structures were known as the Walls of Jericho and were demolished in the mid 1980s as they were deemed to be unsafe.

== Industry ==
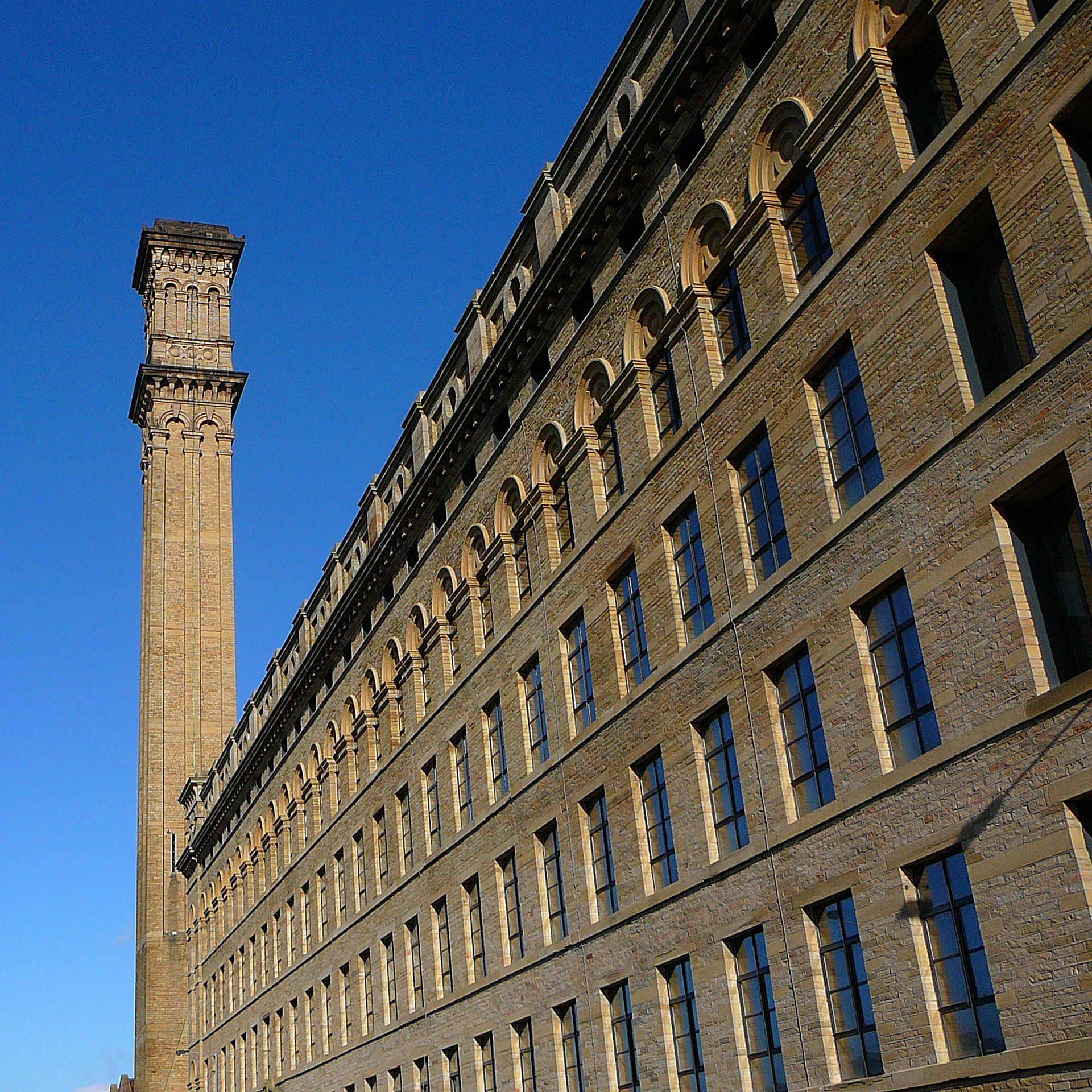
Manningham Mills

The dominant industries in Bradford Dale were in wool and worsted. A fulling mill was first recorded as being just to the west of the present city centre in 1316. An influx of Flemish weavers into England during the reign of Edward III had a positive effect on the woollen and worsted trade in the dale. During the 18th and early 19th centuries, most textile working was undertaken as a private enterprise in people's homes, with some 6,000 people employed in the industry throughout the dale. Large scale wool operations developed in the dale from the 19th century onwards. Proliferation of woollen mills led to a cluster of buildings in the Little Germany area of Bradford. The wool warehouses and mills that make up Little Germany were hampered during construction due to the presence of old mine workings.

The mills at Manningham burnt down in 1871, and in 1873, Samuel Cunliffe Lister built his new grade II* listed Manningham Mills (better known as Lister Mills) to a design in keeping with the woollen warehouses and mills in Little Germany. The mill produced textiles, particularly silk, and was the largest textile factory in England as well as being the largest silk factory in the world when in full production. During the Second World War, the mill produced parachute cord and silk for the British military. The mills were closed in 1992.

Most of the metalworking and chemical industries were undertaken at Low Moor south of the dale although Bierley Ironworks consumed most of the coal worked within the dale. This required lime to be imported into the dale from Skipton (or elsewhere as Bradford Dale was on sandstone beds and had no lime of its own). In the early part of the 19th century, Bierley, Bowling and Low Moor Ironworks were valuable sources of cannon shot for the British military who were engaged in the Napoleonic Wars. At that time, the tonnage of their finished product was outstripping similar furnaces in the traditional South Yorkshire steel production area.

== Settlements ==
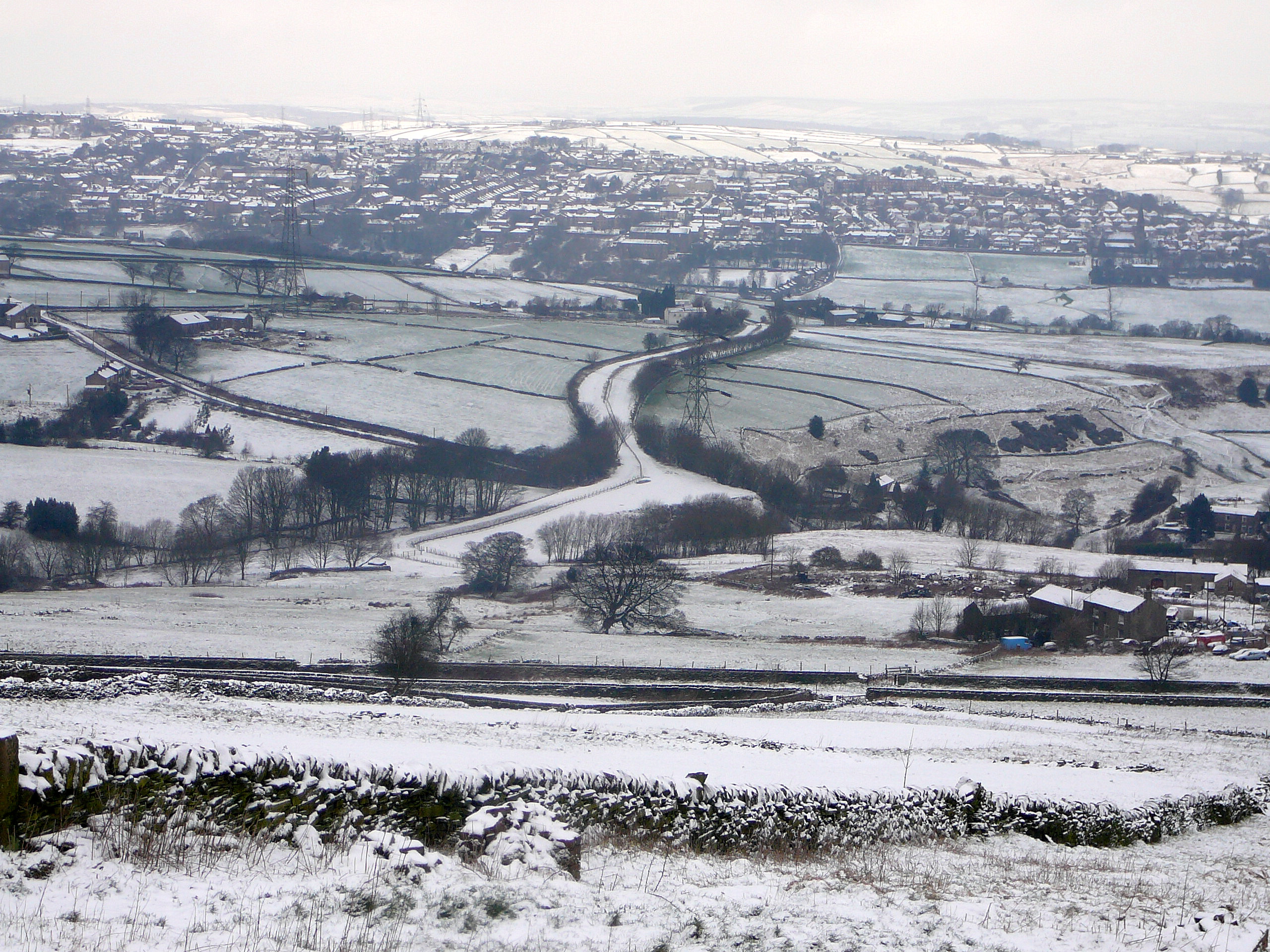
The site of Queensbury railway station. Thornton is in the distance.

Apart from the town of Bradford, the following settlements have been recorded historically as being in Bradford Dale.

- Allerton
- Bierley
- Bolling
- Bolton
- Chellow
- Clayton
- Eccleshill
- Frizinghall
- Heaton
- Great Horton and Little Horton
- Manningham
- Mountain
- Queensbury
- Scholemoor
- Thornton
- Wilsden

Shipley is also mentioned as being at the "junction of the valleys of Bradford and the Aire".
