= Bradford Dale =

Bradford Dale may refer to:

- Bradford Dale, river valley of the River Bradford in Derbyshire, England
- Bradford Dale (Yorkshire), river valley in England
