= Egypt, Bradford =

Hamlet in West Yorkshire, England

Coordinates: 53°48′08″N 1°51′43″W

Egypt
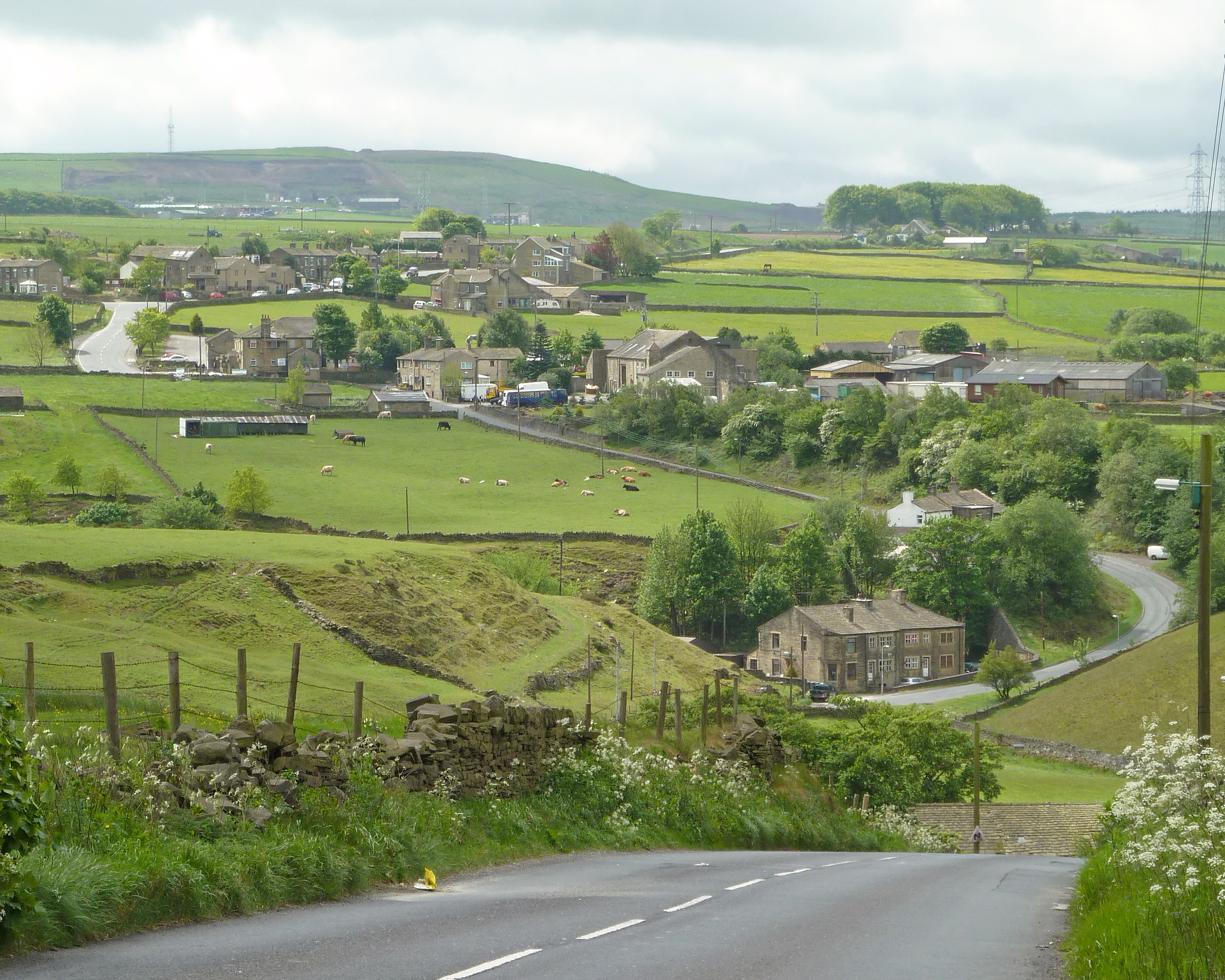
- A view of Egypt, with part of the so-called "Walls of Jericho" visible in the foreground

- Location within West Yorkshire
- Metropolitan borough: Bradford
- Metropolitan county: West Yorkshire
- Region: Yorkshire and the Humber
- Country: England
- Sovereign state: United Kingdom
- Police: West Yorkshire
- Fire: West Yorkshire
- Ambulance: Yorkshire

Egypt is a hamlet near Thornton, in the City of Bradford, West Yorkshire, England.

== Geography ==
Egypt is situated about one mile (1.6 km) north-west of Thornton on a hairpin bend of a road between Well Heads and a junction with the B6144 road near Wilsden, and at the top (western) end of the marked valley of Bell Dean in which a stream runs roughly in an eastern direction. High walls that were erected to hold back the waste rock from the local quarries flank the road, giving rise to the nickname "The Walls of Jericho".

== History ==
The hamlet was established in the first half of the 19th century and is named on maps surveyed in the late 1840s. Its name may be related to the commemoration of the 1798 invasion of Egypt by the troops of Napoleon Bonaparte, or the nearby Egypt Methodist Chapel which was already demolished by 1876. The names of other hamlets in the area such as Jericho, Jerusalem, and World's End are also of biblical origin.

Quarrying was the major industry in the area, with about 30 active quarries reported in the 1870s.

== See also ==
- Listed buildings in Thornton and Allerton, West Yorkshire
