= Listed buildings in Thornton and Allerton, West Yorkshire =

Thornton and Allerton is a ward in the metropolitan borough of the City of Bradford, West Yorkshire, England. It contains 135 listed buildings that are recorded in the National Heritage List for England. Of these, two are listed at Grade I, the highest of the three grades, six are at Grade II*, the middle grade, and the others are at Grade II, the lowest grade. The ward contains the villages of Thornton and Allerton, the hamlet of Egypt, and the surrounding countryside. Most of the listed buildings are houses, cottages and associated structures, farmhouses and farm buildings. The other listed buildings include churches, a chapel, the ruins of another chapel, public houses, textile mill buildings, a railway viaduct, and two war memorials.

== Key ==
Grade	Criteria
I	Buildings of exceptional interest, sometimes considered to be internationally important
II*	Particularly important buildings of more than special interest
II	Buildings of national importance and special interest

== Buildings ==
Name and location	Photograph	Date	Notes	Grade
Hoyle Ing House; 53.79417°N 1.83900°W	—	Late 16th century	The rebuilding of an earlier house, it is in sandstone and has a stone slate roof with coped gables and finials. There are two storeys, and a later single-storey dairy at the south. The windows are mullioned or mullioned and transomed, some with very large triangular lintels, and some windows have been altered. Some doorways have been blocked and others inserted.	II
Upper Headley Hall; 53.78566°N 1.85297°W	—	1589	The hall is in gritstone with a stone slate roof. There are two storeys, and it consists of a main range, and a west wing that has a moulded saddlestone and capped shaped kneelers. On the front is a gabled porch with a finial, the outer doorway with moulded jambs and a four-centred arched head in a squared head. The spandrels are initialled and dated, and above is a dated hood mould. On the front of the hall are mullioned and transomed windows with wrought iron casements, and containing finely detailed original glazing. The windows on the sides and rear are mullioned, and in the right return are two large upright oval windows.	I
Barn, Upper Headley Hall; 53.78584°N 1.85332°W	—	Late 16th or early 17th century	The barn is in gritstone and has a stone slate roof with saddlestones. It contains a large portal.	II
Dean House; 53.79948°N 1.83196°W		1605	The oldest part is the left wing, the rest of the house dating from about 1620. It is in gritstone and sandstone, with a string course and stone slate roofs. There are two storeys and an irregular front of three gables with kneelers and finials. The doorway has a four-centred arch, and the windows are mullioned or mullioned and transomed. In the left gable is a carved panel containing the date, initials, and the cross of the Knights of St John of Jerusalem, and on the right gable is a dated and initialled sundial.	II*
Ruins of St James' Chapel; 53.79037°N 1.84087°W		1612	The ruins of the chapel are in the churchyard of St James' Church. They are in sandstone, and consist of parts of the walls, and a reconstructed bell turret. The main surviving part is the east wall, which incorporates a window with Perpendicular tracery, parts of the side walls, and a projecting vestry or chapel containing a three-light window. Re-set in the east wall are three datestones. The bell turret is on a plinth, it is octagonal, and has an embattled parapet.	II
Aldersley Farmhouse; 53.80006°N 1.84504°W		Early 17th century {possible}	The farmhouse is timber framed, and was extended and encased in gritstone later in the 17th century. It has large quoins, and a stone slate roof with saddlestones and kneelers. There are two storeys, the north front has four bays, the left bay projecting, and it contains a doorway with squared jambs. The south front is symmetrical with three bays, and has a string course and a 19th-century gabled porch. The windows are mullioned, and there is a blind round-headed window in the north front.	II*
Kipping Barn; 53.79022°N 1.85234°W	—	Early to mid 17th century	A large aisled barn, it is in gritstone with a stone slate roof and two storeys. Facing the road is a gabled end containing a doorway approached by steps, windows and slit vents. At the rear is a central full height portal and windows.	II
94 Market Street, Thornton; 53.79104°N 1.84959°W	—	17th century {possible}	A cottage that was refronted in about 1800, it is in sandstone with quoins, and a gable end with kneelers facing the street. There are two storeys and one bay, and it contains a doorway, and a window in each floor.	II
Former Duke of York Public House; 53.80651°N 1.85648°W	—	17th century	Originally a farmhouse and at one time a public house, it was enlarged in about 1800–10. The building is in sandstone with a hipped stone slate roof, and the oldest part is the gabled wing. There are two storeys and the main part has three bays and a modern porch. The doorway has a chamfered surround and the windows are mullioned with two lights.	II
Kipping House; 53.79014°N 1.85275°W	—	17th century	The house, which was altered in the 18th and 19th centuries, is in gritstone and sandstone with quoins, and a stone slate roof with saddlestones. There are two storeys, and in the front facing the road are a doorway with squared jambs and mullioned windows. In the east gable end are windows with architraves, and on the other front are sash windows with cornices on console brackets.	II
Thornton Hall; 53.78993°N 1.84111°W	—	17th century {or earlier}	The south range of a former larger house, it was altered in 1886. The house is in gritstone, with quoins, string courses, a parapet, and a stone slate roof. There are three storeys and a front of three bays. The windows in the ground and middle floors are mullioned and transomed with six lights, and in the top floor they are mullioned with five lights. In the east wall is a doorway with chamfered jambs and a heavy lintel, and on the front is a sundial dated 1774.	II*
Garden wall with bee boles, Thornton Hall; 53.79005°N 1.84166°W	—	17th century {probable}	The garden wall is in sandstone, and between 12 feet (3.7 m) and 14 feet (4.3 m) high. It has stone coping and a stone band above four bee boles, which consist of shallow recesses with triangular heads.	II
Squirrel Hill Farmhouse; 53.78495°N 1.87407°W	—	17th century	The farmhouse, which was largely rebuilt in about 1800, is in sandstone, and has a stone slate roof with saddlestones and moulded kneelers, one dated. There are two storeys, a lower cottage extension, and a rear outshut. The doorway has squared jambs and a gabled hood, and the windows are mullioned.	II
Upper Green Farm Cottage; 53.79981°N 1.84457°W	—	17th century	The cottage, which was altered in the 19th century, is in rendered gritstone with a stone slate roof. There are two storeys and three bays. The doorway has chamfered jambs, the upper floor windows are mullioned, and modern bow windows have been inserted in the ground floor.	II
Outbuilding east of West End Farmhouse; 53.80080°N 1.83084°W	—	17th century	The outbuilding is in gritstone and sandstone, with quoins, and a stone slate roof with saddlestones and shaped kneelers. There are two storeys, and it contains mullioned windows with hood moulds. On a gable end is a panel carved with the cross of the Knights of St John of Jerusalem.	II
Outbuilding east of Leventhorpe Hall; 53.79143°N 1.82325°W	—	Mid to late 17th century	A dwelling, later altered, it is in gritstone, with quoins, and a stone slate roof with saddlestones. There are two storeys, it contains mullioned windows with hood moulds, and a doorway with a massive pediment-shaped lintel.	II
Courtyard entrance and walling, Upper Headley Hall; 53.78555°N 1.85284°W		1669	At the entrance to the courtyard is a stone archway with a semicircular head, moulded imposts, rusticated voussoirs, and an initialled and dated keystone. The archway is in a recess containing stone seats, and on the recess and the archway are ball finials on moulded bases. It is flanked by a dry stone wall with moulded capping.	I
Leventhorpe Hall; 53.79144°N 1.82365°W		Late 17th century	A house that has been altered, it is in gritstone and has a double pitch stone slate roof, and gables with saddlestones and shaped kneelers. There are two storeys, and symmetrical north and south fronts. The windows are mullioned and transomed, including a stair window in the north front. In the centre of the south front is a porch and a doorway with squared jambs, and the west front contains a doorway with moulded jambs and a four-centred arched head.	II*
Lower Bailey Fold Farmhouse; 53.80192°N 1.83456°W		Late 17th century	The farmhouse is in gritstone, with quoins, and a stone slate roof with saddlestones. There are two storeys and a rear outshut. In the upper floor are mullioned windows, and the windows in the ground floor are mullioned and transomed with hood moulds. On the front is a pedimented porch, and the left gable end contains a doorway that has a massive lintel with a slightly ogee arch.	II*
Oxheys Farmhouse; 53.78999°N 1.83414°W	—	Late 17th century	The farmhouse is in gritstone or sandstone and is rendered on the front. It has a stone slate roof, two storeys, three bays, and a rear outshut. The windows are mullioned, with hood moulds on the ground floor.	II
5 Lower Kipping Lane, Thornton; 53.79008°N 1.85296°W	—	17th or 18th century	Part of a larger house, converted into two cottages in the early 19th century, the building is in sandstone with stone slate roofs. There are two storeys and the right cottage is lower than the left. The windows on the front are mullioned, with two, three or four lights. The doorways have squared jambs, in the right cottage the doorway is in the upper floor and is approached by a flight of steps. At the rear, the windows have architraves, and there is an oeil-de-boeuf window.	II
7 Lower Kipping Lane, Thornton; 53.79000°N 1.85304°W	—	17th or 18th century	Probably part of a larger house, the building is in gritstone and sandstone and has a stone slate roof. Facing the road is a doorway with moulded chamfered jambs. At right angles is a two-storey front with two-light mullioned windows. The rear is roughcast and gabled with kneelers, and contains mullioned windows.	II
90, 90A and 92 Market Street, Thornton; 53.79104°N 1.84941°W	—	Late 17th or early 18th century	A row of three cottages with shop fronts in sandstone with some gritstone that were refronted in about 1800. They have quoins, and a stone slate roof with a small kneeler. There are two storeys and three bays. In the upper floor are two-light mullioned windows, and the doorways have squared jambs. The shop front to No. 90 is modern, the others date from the 19th century, and have pilastered frames.	II
17 and 19 Town End Road and 17 and 19 Back Fold, Thornton; 53.79176°N 1.84974°W	—	Late 17th or early 18th century	A house that was extended and altered in about 1800 to form two cottages. They are in sandstone, with two storeys, and have stone slate roofs with saddlestones and red brick chimneys. No. 17 has a doorway with a chamfered surround, rounded corners, and a lintel. The windows are mullioned with hood moulds and some mullions have been removed. The doorway of No. 19 has squared jambs, and the windows are mullioned with four lights.	II
Dye Royd Farmhouse and barn 53.78638°N 1.84738°W	—	17th or 18th century	The farmhouse and barn are in one range, and the barn was partly rebuilt in the 19th century. They are in gritstone, with quoins and a stone slate roof. There are two storeys and a rear outshut. The doorway has squared jambs, and the windows are mullioned with two or three lights.	II
Stocks, Thornton Hall; 53.79010°N 1.83956°W	—	17th or 18th century (probable)	The stocks consist of three monolithic stone posts. The left post is short, the right is taller and chamfered, and slotted between them is a block cut to take the legs of two people.	II
Moor House Farmhouse and barn 53.80557°N 1.84354°W	—	1709	The farmhouse, which was partly rebuilt in 1890, is in sandstone with some gritstone, and has quoins and a stone slate roof. There are two storeys, a rear wing, and outshuts, and it contains mullioned windows and a reset datestone. The barn to the west, which was later extended, is in dry walled gritstone and is partly aisled.	II
85 and 87 Hill Top Lane, Allerton; 53.80314°N 1.82946°W	—	18th century	A pair of sandstone cottages, partly rendered, that have a stone slate roof with kneelers. There are two storeys, the windows are mullioned with two lights, and those in the ground floor have hood moulds.	II
35A, 37 and 39 School Green, Thornton; 53.79209°N 1.83252°W	—	Mid 18th century	A farmhouse converted into two cottages in about 1800–30, they are in painted gritstone with moulded stone eaves, and a stone slate roof with a saddlestone and kneelers at the east end. There are two storeys, and the windows are mullioned, with a mullioned and transomed stair window at the rear.	II
38–44 Upper Allerton Lane; 53.80111°N 1.84621°W	—	Mid 18th century (probable)	The earliest part is No. 38, the rest being an extension and rebuilding in about 1800. No. 38 is in gritstone with quoins, and a stone slate roof with saddlestones and kneelers. The other cottages are in sandstone, and No. 44 has a sill band. All the cottages have doorways with squared jambs and either single-light or mullioned windows.	II
112 and 114 Market Street, Thornton; 53.79104°N 1.85064°W	—	1757	A pair of cottages that have been altered, they are in sandstone with quoins and stone slate roofs with saddlestones and kneelers. The windows and doorways have squared surrounds, and in the ground floor is a shop window.	II
45–51 Market Street, Thornton; 53.79090°N 1.84948°W	—	Mid to late 18th century	A row of cottages that were doubled in depth towards Market Street in about 1830. They are in sandstone with stone slate roofs, and a flat-headed passageway leads from the front to the rear. On the Market Street front are doorways, one or two-light windows, and a shop front with pilasters. In the original front are mullioned windows, doorways with squared surrounds, a single-light window above each doorway, and a small round-headed blind window to the left of each doorway.	II
11 and 13 Lane End, Thornton; 53.79003°N 1.85488°W	—	Late 18th century	Originally one house, it is in sandstone with quoins, and a stone slate roof with shaped kneelers. There are two storeys and the windows are mullioned with two lights. The doorway of No. 11 has squared jambs, and No. 13 has a gabled trellis porch.	II
Dean Lane Farmhouse and barn 53.80401°N 1.85950°W	—	Late 18th century (probable)	The barn is the older part, the farmhouse dating from about 1830–40. They are in sandstone with a stone slate roof. The house has two storeys, mullioned windows and a later porch. The barn is partly dry walled, and contains a portal with a massive lintel.	II
Green Clough Farmhouse and barn 53.78626°N 1.86870°W	—	Late 18th century	The farmhouse and barn are under the same roof, and there is a later northeast wing and outshuts. They are in sandstone with quoins, and stone slate roofs with saddlestones and shaped kneelers. The house has two storeys, and contains a doorway and mullioned windows with squared surrounds. The barn contains a portal with a massive lintel.	II
Highfield Farmhouse and barn 53.78768°N 1.86832°W	—	Late 18th century	The farmhouse and barn are under one roof, they are in sandstone with quoins, and a stone slate roof with saddlestones and prominent kneelers. The house has two storeys, and the windows are mullioned with two or four lights. The doorway is modern, and to its left is a small round-arched light. The barn contains a semicircular arched portal that has been converted into a window.	II
Barn east of Leventhorpe Hall; 53.79175°N 1.82324°W	—	Late 18th century	The barn, which was largely rebuilt, is in gritstone and sandstone, and the roof is of stone slate with saddlestones and kneelers.	II
Barn north of Leventhorpe Hall; 53.79182°N 1.82376°W	—	Late 18th century	The barn is in sandstone with a stone slate roof. On the front facing the road is a projecting two-storey porch with a hipped roof, containing a doorway with a quoined surround and a stone lintel, above which is a three-light mullioned window.	II
Shay Farmhouse and barn 53.78253°N 1.87943°W	—	Late 18th century (or later)	The farmhouse and integral barn are in sandstone, partly dry walled, and have a stone slate roof with shaped kneelers. There are two storeys, the doorway has squared jambs, and the windows are mullioned.	II
Thomson Square; 53.79407°N 1.86155°W	—	Late 18th century	A farmhouse to which a row of cottages was added in the early to mid 19th century. The buildings are in sandstone with stone slate roofs and two storeys. The windows are mullioned, with some mullions removed. The farmhouse has quoins, saddlestones and kneelers.	II
High Stream Head Farmhouse and barn 53.80421°N 1.86471°W	—	1788	The farmhouse and adjoining barn are in sandstone with console brackets to the eaves, and a stone slate roof with saddlestones and kneelers. There are two storeys and a rear outshut, and the windows are mullioned with two or four lights. The barn is built into the hillside and at the rear is a top loading bay.	II
Outbuilding south of Lower Hoyle Ing Farmhouse; 53.79477°N 1.83591°W	—	Mid 18th to early 19th century	The outbuilding is in sandstone with quoins and two storeys. On the east front is a pediment with moulded coping, the tympanum containing a bull's eye window flanked by pigeonholes. In the upper floor is a false arched window with impost blocks, a keystone, and painted glazing, flanked by narrow round-arched windows. The ground floor contains a doorway and two small windows.	II
42 and 44 Alderscholes Lane, Thornton; 53.78796°N 1.86635°W	—	c. 1800	A pair of sandstone cottages raised above the road. They have a stone slate roof with saddlestones and prominent kneelers. There are two storeys, the doorways have plain squared surrounds, and the windows are mullioned with three lights.	II
1–17 Bridge Street, Thornton; 53.79062°N 1.84959°W		c. 1800	A row of sandstone cottages stepped up a hill, with block brackets on a bed mould to the eaves, and stone slate roofs. There are two storeys, and the doorways have squared jambs, and shallow cornices on console brackets. The windows have either single lights, or are mullioned with two or three lights.	II
422–440 Allerton Road, Allerton; 53.80556°N 1.82766°W	—	c. 1800–20	A row of sandstone cottages with a sill band, spaced dentilled eaves brackets, and stone slate roofs. There are two storeys, the windows have either single lights, or are mullioned with some mullions removed. No. 424 is a projecting gabled wing with a saddlestone, and its doorway has a cornice hood on console brackets.	II
456 and 458 Allerton Road, Allerton; 53.80557°N 1.82873°W	—	c. 1800–20	A pair of sandstone cottages at right angles to the road, with spaced dentilled eaves brackets, and stone slate roofs. There are two storeys, the windows over the doorways have a single light, and the other windows are mullioned with two lights.	II
24–30 Alderscholes Lane, Thornton; 53.78883°N 1.85920°W	—	c. 1800–20	A row of sandstone cottages with a stone slate roof and two storeys. Some windows have single lights, and the others are mullioned with two lights, with some mullions removed.	II
1, 3 and 5 Sapgate Lane, Thornton; 53.79116°N 1.84786°W	—	c. 1800–20	A row of three sandstone cottages with a stone slate roof and two storeys. The doorways have squared jambs, and the windows have either single lights, or are mullioned with two lights.	II
2, 4 and 6 Sapgate Lane, Thornton; 53.79111°N 1.84752°W	—	c. 1800–20	A row of three sandstone cottages with a stone slate roof and two storeys. Each cottage has a doorway with squared jambs above which is a single-light window. The other windows are mullioned with two lights, and some mullions removed.	II
15–21 Sapgate Lane, Thornton; 53.79127°N 1.84746°W	—	c. 1800–20	A row of four sandstone cottages with a stone slate roof and two storeys. Each cottage has a doorway with squared jambs above which is a single-light window, and the other windows are mullioned with two lights.	II
23–31 Sapgate Lane, Thornton; 53.79153°N 1.84739°W	—	c. 1800–20	A row of five sandstone cottages stepped up a hill, with stone slate roofs. There are two storeys, and each cottage has a doorway with squared jambs. The windows have either single lights, or are mullioned with two or three lights.	II
25–35 School Green, Thornton; 53.79207°N 1.83283°W	—	c. 1800–20	A row of back to back cottages in sandstone, with a sill band, spaced dentilled eaves brackets, and a stone slate roof. There are two storeys, the doorways have squared jambs, and the windows have a single light, or are mullioned with two or three lights, and some mullions removed.	II
1185–1195 Thornton Road, and 1 and 3 Brighouse and Denholme Road; 53.78734°N 1.88563°W	—	c. 1800–20	A group of sandstone cottages with paired dentilled eaves brackets, and stone slate roofs with saddlestones and prominent kneelers. There are two storeys, and the doorways have squared jambs. Some windows have single lights, and others are mullioned with three lights. One cottage has a canted bay window, and another has a doorway with a cornice.	II
Pinchbeck; 53.78905°N 1.85823°W		c. 1800–20	A long row of sandstone cottages with dentilled eaves brackets and stone slate roofs. There are two storeys, the doorways have squared jambs, and the windows either have single lights or are mullioned with two lights.	II
Upper Green Farmhouse and Barn; 53.79975°N 1.84403°W	—	c. 1800–20	The farmhouse and barn are in one range, they are in sandstone, and have stone slate roofs with saddlestones. The house has two storeys, a sill band, a doorway with a cornice, and mullioned windows. The barn is lower and contains plain openings and a portal with a flat lintel.	II
19 Market Street and barn, Thornton; 53.79089°N 1.84616°W	—	c. 1800–30	The house and barn are in sandstone with stone slate roofs. The house has two storeys, and contains mullioned windows, with some mullions removed. In the barn is a doorway with a large lintel.	II
Upper Pikeley Farmhouse; 53.80221°N 1.85298°W	—	c. 1800–30	A sandstone farmhouse with a stone slate roof and two storeys. The doorway has squared jambs, and the windows are mullioned with three lights.	II
74 Market Street, wall and railings, Thornton; 53.79105°N 1.84863°W		1802	The house, home of the Brontë family, is in sandstone, with a moulded cornice on paired modillion brackets and a stone slate roof. There are two storeys, three bays, and a single-storey shop projecting from the right bay. The central doorway has a moulded cornice on console brackets, above it is a single-light window, the other windows are mullioned with two lights, and all contain sashes. The projecting bay has a canted corner with a doorway, and on the front is a shop window with a moulded cornice on moulded consoles. Extending to the left is a small garden enclosed by a wall with wrought iron railings.	II*
76 and 78 Market Street, Thornton; 53.79105°N 1.84885°W	—	c. 1802	Originally a stable and coach house and a cottage, later a pair of cottages, they are in sandstone, with block brackets to the eaves and a stone slate roof. There are two storeys and an attic, two bays, and an outshut on the left. The doorways have squared jambs, and the windows are mullioned with two lights.	II
Cloggers Row; 53.79101°N 1.84593°W		1806	A long row of sandstone cottages with stone slate roofs. They have two storeys and most cottages have doorways with plain surrounds and lintels, a single-light window above, and two-light mullioned windows to the right. No. 10 has a round-headed doorway and windows with keystones, and on the front of the row is a datestone.	II
60 and 62 Market Street, Thornton; 53.79106°N 1.84802°W	—	1814	A sandstone house, later divided, with paired modillion eaves brackets and a stone slate roof. There are two storeys and a basement, and a symmetrical front of three bays. The doorway on the front has squared jambs, a rectangular fanlight, and a moulded cornice on console brackets. Above the doorway is a dated and initialled plaque, and the windows are sashes. In the right return is an added doorway and porch.	II
Fern Bank; 53.79104°N 1.84773°W	—	c. 1814	A group of cottages on an angled corner site and partly back to back, they are in sandstone, with paired modillion eaves brackets, a stone slate roof, and two storeys. The doorways have squared jambs and moulded cornices on console brackets, and the windows either have a single light or are mullioned with two lights.	II
392–406 Allerton Road, Allerton; 53.80571°N 1.82585°W	—	c. 1820	A group of cottages forming an L-shaped plan, they are in sandstone with a sill band, spaced dentilled eaves brackets, and stone slate roofs. There are two storeys, the doorways have plain squared surrounds, and the windows have either single lights, or are mullioned with some mullions removed.	II
1–13 Back Field, Thornton; 53.79151°N 1.84994°W	—	c. 1820	A row of seven sandstone cottages stepped up a hill, with dentilled eaves brackets, and stone slate roofs. There are two storeys, and each cottage has two bays. The doorways have plain surrounds, some windows have single lights, some are mullioned with two lights, some mullions have been removed, and No. 13 has inserted bow windows.	II
15, 17, 22 and 24 Back Field, Thornton; 53.79176°N 1.84975°W	—	c. 1820	A row of four sandstone cottages, partly running over a road, with sill bands, dentilled eaves brackets, and a stone slate roof. There are two storeys, some windows have single lights, others are mullioned with two lights, and some mullions have been removed. A large lintel carries the upper floor of the middle houses over the roadway.	II
19–29 Back Field, Thornton; 53.79197°N 1.84990°W	—	c. 1820	A row of six sandstone cottages stepped up a hill, with dentilled eaves brackets, and stone slate roofs. There are two storeys, some windows have single lights, and the others are mullioned with two lights.	II
1 Havelock Square, Thornton; 53.79113°N 1.84901°W		c. 1820	A sandstone house with a stone slate roof at the end of a row. There are three storeys and a basement, the end forms a three-storey canted bay window with mullions and three lights, and the roof above is hipped. The east front contains two-light mullioned windows and a doorway with squared jambs.	II
3–15 Havelock Square, Thornton; 53.79132°N 1.84901°W	—	c. 1820	A row of sandstone cottages with shallow eaves brackets and stone slate roofs, stepped in pairs up a hill. They have two storeys, and the doorways have shallow slab hoods. Above the doorways are single-light windows, and the other windows are mullioned with two lights.	II
17, 19 and 21 Havelock Square, Thornton; 53.79150°N 1.84884°W		c. 1820	A group of three sandstone cottages with stone slate roofs and two storeys. No. 17 is recessed and has shallow eaves brackets. The windows of No. 21 have been altered, including the insertion of bow windows in the ground floor, and the windows in the other houses are mullioned with two or three lights.	II
15–21 Hill Top Road, Thornton; 53.79423°N 1.85977°W	—	c. 1820	A row of sandstone cottages with a sill band, dentilled eaves and a stone slate roof. The doorways have squared jambs, some of the windows have single lights, the other windows are mullioned with two lights, and some mullions have been removed.	II
186, 188 and 190 Hill Top Road, Thornton; 53.79466°N 1.86463°W	—	c. 1820	A row of three sandstone cottages that have a stone slate roof with saddlestones and kneelers. There are two storeys, the doorways have squared jambs, and the windows are mullioned with two lights.	II
Former Brown Cow Public House; 53.78748°N 1.88599°W	—	c. 1820	A group of cottages on a corner site, at one time a public house, they are in sandstone, with bracketed eaves and stone slate roofs. There are two storeys, the doorways have squared jambs, and the windows are mullioned.	II
5–11 Allerton Lane, Thornton; 53.79263°N 1.83323°W	—	c. 1820–30	A row of four sandstone cottages with a sill band, dentilled block eaves brackets, and a stone slate roof. There are two storeys, the doorways have plain surrounds, above each doorway is a single-light window, and the other windows are mullioned with three lights, and some mullions removed.	II
70–90 Hill Top Road, Thornton; 53.79446°N 1.86000°W		c. 1820–30	A long row of sandstone cottages, slightly stepped up a hill in pairs, they have sill bands, dentilled eaves, and stone slate roofs. There are two storeys, the doorways have squared jambs, and the windows are mullioned with two lights.	II
118, 120 and 122 Hill Top Road, Thornton; 53.79452°N 1.86186°W	—	c. 1820–30	A row of three sandstone cottages with a sill band, stone bracketed gutters, and a stone slate roof. The doorways have squared jambs, and No. 118 also has a cornice on consoles. Some of the windows have single lights, the other windows are mullioned with two lights, and some mullions have been removed.	II
7 and 9 Lane End, Thornton; 53.79001°N 1.85509°W	—	c. 1820–30	A pair of sandstone cottages with stone slate roofs. They have two storeys, and there is a later extension to the west. The doorways have squared jambs, and the windows are mullioned with three lights.	II
48, 50 and 52 Market Street, Thornton; 53.79107°N 1.84752°W	—	c. 1820–30	A row of three sandstone houses with plat bands, block bracketed eaves, and a stone slate roof. There are three storeys and each house has two bays. The doorways have squared jambs, above them are single-light windows, and in the other bays are three-light mullioned windows, with some mullions removed.	II
120–128 Old Road, Thornton; 53.79252°N 1.83296°W	—	c. 1820–30	A row of five sandstone cottages with a sill band, block bracketed eaves, and a stone slate roof. There are two storeys, the doorways have squared jambs, above each doorway is a single-light window, and the other windows are mullioned with three lights, and some mullions removed.	II
Long Row; 53.79474°N 1.85930°W		c. 1820–30	A log row of sandstone cottages with sill bands, dentilled eaves brackets, and stone slate roofs. They have two storeys and contain doorways with squared jambs, and windows, some have single lights and the others are mullioned with two lights.	II
Upper Bailey Fold; 53.80230°N 1.83424°W	—	1821	A small farmhouse in sandstone with a stone slate roof. There are two storeys, the doorway has squared jambs and a cornice on consoles, and the windows are mullioned with two or three lights.	II
1 Old Allen Road and barn, Allerton; 53.80652°N 1.85660°W	—	Early 19th century	A small farmhouse and barn in sandstone with stone slate roofs. The house has two storeys, and contains a doorway with squared jambs, and windows, some have single lights and the others are mullioned with two lights. The barn has kneelers.	II
8–12 Egypt Road, Egypt; 53.80233°N 1.86163°W		Early 19th century	A row of sandstone cottages with block bracketed eaves, and a stone slate roof. There are two storeys, the doorways have squared jambs, and the windows have single lights, or are mullioned with two lights.	II
1–9 Bank Heights and barn, Thornton; 53.79830°N 1.86128°W	—	Early 19th century	A row of cottages, and a barn and two more cottages added in 1836. They are in sandstone with stone slate roofs, the roof of No. 9 having a saddlestone. The cottages have two storeys, doorways with squared jambs, and windows with single lights, or two lights and mullions. The barn has a moulded eaves cornice, and contains a segmental-arched entry with voussoirs, above which is a triangular dovecote.	II
9 and 11 Hill Top Road, Thornton; 53.79419°N 1.85957°W	—	Early 19th century	A pair of sandstone cottages at right angles to the road, they have a sill band and a stone slate roof. There are two storeys, the doorways have squared jambs, the windows are mullioned with two lights, and some have been altered.	II
29 and 31 Hill Top Road, Thornton; 53.79426°N 1.86079°W	—	Early 19th century	A pair of sandstone cottages, originally back to back, with stone slate roofs and two storeys. Some of the windows have single lights, the others are mullioned with two lights. No. 29 has a small outbuilding, and the doorway of No. 31 has a hood with a decorated doorhead and brackets.	II
192–204 Hill Top Road, Thornton; 53.79456°N 1.86521°W	—	Early 19th century	A group of sandstone cottages, with No. 204 at right angles. They have stone slate roofs, and two storeys. The doorways have squared jambs, some of the windows have single lights, the others are mullioned with two lights.	II
1–19 Friendly Street and 383 Thornton Road, Thornton; 53.79026°N 1.85186°W	—	Early 19th century	A block of sandstone cottages, partly back to back, forming an L-shaped plan and stepped down the hill, with block eaves brackets, and hipped stone slate roofs. They have two or three storeys, the doorways have squared jambs, and the windows are mullioned with two lights. No. 383 Thornton Road has three bays and a doorway with a cornice on console brackets.	II
2–10 Friendly Street, Thornton; 53.79026°N 1.85166°W	—	Early 19th century	A block of sandstone cottages, back to back with Priestley Street, with stone slate roofs. They are stepped down the hill, and have two or three storeys. The doorways have squared jambs, and the windows are mullioned with two lights.	II
172 and 174 Hill Top Road, Thornton; 53.79457°N 1.86396°W	—	Early 19th century	A pair of sandstone cottages with a sill band, kneelers above bracketed eaves, and a stone slate roof. There are two storeys, the doorways have squared jambs, and the windows are mullioned with two lights.	II
176–184 Hill Top Road, Thornton; 53.79462°N 1.86429°W	—	Early 19th century	A row of sandstone cottages with a stone slate roof and two storeys. The doorways have squared jambs, the windows are mullioned with two lights, and some have been altered.	II
55 and 57 Market Street, Thornton; 53.79092°N 1.84992°W	—	Early 19th century	The buildings are in sandstone with stone slate roofs and have two storeys. No. 51 projects and is a cottage with block brackets to the eaves and a hipped roof, and it contains a doorway and a shop window in the ground floor and two sash windows above. No. 55 is a shop with four bays, a central shop front with pilasters, round-headed lights to the windows and a fascia, and to the right is a doorway. The windows are sashes. At the rear are doorways with square jambs, windows with single lights, and three-light mullioned windows.	II
2 and 4 Priestley Street, Thornton; 53.79019°N 1.85140°W	—	Early 19th century	A pair of cottages back to back with South Square. They are in sandstone, with stone slate roofs, and three storeys. The doorways have squared jambs, and the windows are mullioned with two lights.	II
18 Sapgate Lane and 1 Corrie Street, Thornton; 53.79137°N 1.84684°W	—	Early 19th century	A sandstone house with quoins, and a stone slate roof with saddlestones and kneelers. There are two storeys and a symmetrical front of three bays. The central doorway has a cornice on consoles, above it is a round-arched arched window with a keystone, and the other windows are mullioned with three lights.	II
379A and 381 Thornton Road and 3, 5, and 9 Priestley Street, Thornton; 53.79030°N 1.85162°W	—	Early 19th century	A row of cottages stepped down a hill, partly back to back, they are in sandstone, with quoins, stone slate roofs, and two storeys. The doorways have squared jambs and the windows either have single lights, or are mullioned with two lights. The front facing Thornton Road has a hipped roof, and contains a doorway with a cornice on consoles.	II
Barn to rear of 72 Market Street, Thornton; 53.79117°N 1.84866°W	—	Early 19th century	The barn is in sandstone, and has a stone slate roof with saddlestones. It contains a segmental archway with voussoirs.	II
Headly Golf Club; 53.78993°N 1.85313°W	—	Early 19th century	Originally cottages, the building is in sandstone with a stone slate roof. There are two storeys, the doorway has squared jambs, there are two two-light mullioned windows, and the others windows have been altered.	II
High Stream Head; 53.80435°N 1.86489°W	—	Early 19th century	A row of sandstone cottages that were extended later, they have a stone slate roof with saddlestones and kneelers. There are two storeys, two doorways, and the windows are mullioned with two or three lights.	II
Hill Top Public House; 53.79426°N 1.86047°W		Early 19th century	The public house is in sandstone with a stone slate roof. There are two storeys, and the windows are mullioned with two lights.	II
Barn west of Low Stream Head Farmhouse; 53.80667°N 1.86571°W	—	Early 19th century	The barn is in sandstone, and has a stone slate roof with a pedimented gable, kneelers and shaped finials. Above the portal is a pedimented dovecote, and flanking it are circular windows with keystones. In the west front is a Venetian window.	II
Barn northeast of Lower Bailey Fold Farmhouse; 53.80204°N 1.83438°W	—	Early 19th century	The barn is in sandstone with quoins and has a stone slate roof.	II
Upper Headley; 53.78542°N 1.85275°W	—	Early 19th century	A row of three sandstone cottages with a stone slate roof. There are two storeys, the doorways have squared jambs, there is one single-light window, and the other windows are mullioned with three lights.	II
3–13 Alderscholes Lane, Thornton; 53.78826°N 1.86454°W	—	c. 1830	A row of sandstone cottages with backs to the road. They have a stone slate roof and two storeys. On the front are doorways with squared jambs, and two-light mullioned windows, and at the rear are blocked four-light windows.	II
21–29 Alderscholes Lane, Thornton; 53.78814°N 1.86511°W	—	c. 1830	A row of sandstone cottages with backs to the road. They have a stone slate roof and two storeys. On the front are doorways with squared jambs, and two-light mullioned windows, and at the rear are single-light windows.	II
36, 38 and 40 Alderscholes Lane, Thornton; 53.78800°N 1.86617°W	—	c. 1830	A row of three sandstone cottages raised above the road. They have stone slate roofs and two storeys. The doorways have plain surrounds, above each doorway is a single-light window, and the other windows are mullioned with two lights.	II
102 and 104 Hill Top Road, Thornton; 53.79448°N 1.86101°W	—	c. 1830	A pair of sandstone cottages with stone slate roofs and two storeys. No. 102 projects and has two bays and a parapet. In the upper floor are single-light windows, and the ground floor contains former shop windows. No. 104 has a projecting gabled porch, and the windows either have single lights or are mullioned with two lights.	II
11–17 Market Street, Thornton; 53.79086°N 1.84589°W	—	1830	Back to back houses in sandstone on a plinth, with sill bands, dentilled eaves, and stone slate roof. There are three storeys, and the fronts are treated as pairs with a central round-arched passageway. The doorways on Market Street have squared jambs, rectangular fanlights, a frieze carved with a diamond pattern, and moulded cornices on carved consoles. The windows above the doorways have single lights, and the others are mullioned with two lights. The doorways at the rear have plain surrounds, and on the front is a date plaque.	II
41 School Green, Thornton; 53.79171°N 1.83286°W		c. 1830	A school, later a cottage, it is in sandstone with spaced block eaves brackets, and a stone slate roof with coped gables. There is one storey and three bays. The central doorway has a squared surround and a stone lintel, and the windows have chamfered mullions and two segmental-headed lights.	II
323–327 Thornton Road and 2–6 Dole Street, Thornton; 53.79009°N 1.84893°W	—	c. 1830	A back to back row of cottages in sandstone, with spaced dentilled eaves brackets, and a stone slate roof. There are two storeys at the front and three at the rear. The doorways have squared jambs, those on the front also with shallow cornices on consoles. There is one single-light window and the other windows are mullioned with two lights.	II
Grandage Gate Farmhouse and barn 53.79295°N 1.83876°W	—	1830	The farmhouse and barn are in sandstone with stone slate roofs. The house has dentilled eaves brackets, two storeys, and a symmetrical front of three bays. The central doorway has squared jambs, a dated frieze, and a cornice on console brackets. Above the doorway is a single-light window, and the outer bays contain two-light mullioned windows. The barn projects, and it contains a segmental archway with voussoirs, above it is a dovecote, and it is flanked by roundels.	II
Hill Top Farmhouse and barn 53.80487°N 1.82852°W	—	c. 1830	The farmhouse and barn are in sandstone with stone slate roofs. The house has quoins, a doorway with squared jambs, and two-light mullioned windows. The barn is at right angles, its roof has saddlestones, and it contains a segmental archway.	II
Intake Farmhouse and barn 53.78751°N 1.87277°W	—	c. 1830	The farmhouse and barn are under one roof, and are in sandstone with a stone slate roof. The house has a doorway with squared jambs, and the windows are mullioned with two lights. In the barn are three openings with squared surrounds.	II
Peat Dykes Farmhouse and barn 53.80799°N 1.86625°W	—	c. 1830	The farmhouse and barn are in sandstone, and under the same stone slate roof. The house has two storeys, a doorway with squared surrounds, and mullioned windows. In the barn is a segmental archway.	II
46, 48 and 50 Alderscholes Lane, Thornton; 53.78779°N 1.86691°W	—	c. 1830–50	A row of three sandstone cottages with a stone slate roof and two storeys. Some of the windows have single lights, and the others are mullioned with two or three lights.	II
283 Thornton Road, Thornton; 53.79018°N 1.84658°W	—	c. 1831	A sandstone house with moulded eaves and a hipped stone slate roof. There are two storeys at the front and three at the rear, and a symmetrical front of three bays. The central doorway has pilasters, a frieze and a cornice, and the windows are sashes.	II
285 and 287 Thornton Road, Thornton; 53.79015°N 1.84683°W	—	1831	A pair of houses in painted sandstone, with a moulded eaves cornice, and a stone slate roof. There are two storeys at the front and three at the rear, and a symmetrical front of five bays. The two doorways have architraves with corner blocks and cornices, and No. 287 has a dated and decorated frieze. The windows are sashes, and at the rear are stair turrets.	II
1–9 South Square and 377 and 379 Thornton Road, Thornton; 53.79016°N 1.85129°W		1832	A group of sandstone cottages with dentilled eaves and hipped stone slate roofs, They form three sides of a square, and some are back to back with Priestley Street. Most cottages have two storeys, those on the south front have three. The doorways have squared jambs, some windows have single lights and others are mullioned with two lights. The fronts on Thornton Road have three bays and contain doorways with a cornices on console brackets.	II
1–29 and 2–36 Havelock Street, Thornton; 53.79201°N 1.84855°W	—	c. 1840	Two terraces of sandstone houses with stone slate roofs stepped up a hill. They have two storeys, the doorways have squared jambs, and some have stone slab hoods. The windows vary, and include two-light mullioned windows and sash windows.	II
4–14 Prospect Street, Thornton; 53.78996°N 1.84654°W	—	c. 1840	A row of cottages stepped down a hill, they are in sandstone with shallow eaves brackets and stone slate roofs. There are two storeys, the doorways have squared jambs, the windows are mullioned with two lights, and some have been altered.	II
Ackroyd Court; 53.79085°N 1.84972°W	—	c. 1840	A row of three sandstone cottages at the rear of No. 53 Market Street. They have block bracketed eaves and stone slate roofs. The doorways have squared jambs, and the windows are mullioned with two lights.	II
Mustard Pot Farmhouse and barn 53.80481°N 1.85099°W	—	c. 1840	The farmhouse and barn are in sandstone with stone slate roofs. The house has two storeys and mullioned windows, and the openings have squared surrounds. The barn contains a segmental arched entry, above which is a round-headed window.	II
53 Market Street, Thornton; 53.79092°N 1.84971°W	—	c. 1840–50	A shop in sandstone, with a sill band and a hipped stone slate roof. There are two storeys and three bays. The central doorway has a small rectangular fanlight, it is flanked by original shop fronts with pilasters and cornices, and in the upper floor are three windows.	II
Low Stream Head Farmhouse; 53.80669°N 1.86529°W	—	c. 1840–50	A sandstone house with a moulded eaves cornice and a stone slate roof. There are two storeys and a symmetrical front of three bays, the middle bay projecting under a pedimented gable. In the centre is a doorway with a cornice, and the windows are sashes, the window above the doorway round-headed with an archivolt.	II
Kipping Independent Chapel; 53.79079°N 1.84785°W		1843	The chapel is in sandstone on a plinth, with quoin pilasters, a plat band, a bed mould to the frieze, a projecting cornice, and a hipped slate roof. There are two storeys, three bays on the front and six on the sides. The middle bay projects slightly and contains a porch with Doric pilasters, a deep frieze, a cornice and a blocking course, and double doors. Above it is a dated plaque, and a tripartite window with pilasters and an entablature. The ground floor windows are similar but with two lights, and the other upper floor windows have single lights and architraves.	II
Railings and gate piers, Kipping Independent Chapel; 53.79089°N 1.84797°W	—	1843	Along the front of the forecourt of the chapel is a dwarf wall with cast iron railings. The gates are flanked by stone piers with quoined pilasters surmounted by ornamental cast iron lamp standards, and at the ends of the walls are terminal piers.	II
Barn southwest of Lower Bailey Fold Farmhouse; 53.80200°N 1.83471°W	—	19th century	The barn, which was rebuilt, is in sandstone with a stone slate roof.	II
Allerton Warehouse; 53.80338°N 1.81769°W	—	c. 1850–60	Two blocks of a textile mill, one is parallel to the road, and the other, at the rear, is at right angles. They are in sandstone, and each block has four storeys and 14 bays. On the front facing the road is a large archway with a keystone depicting the head of an alpaca ram, containing cast iron gates. In the east corner is a narrow water tower with a small Venetian window in the top stage.	II
Close Head House and barn 53.79251°N 1.87547°W	—	1857	The house and barn are in sandstone with stone slate roofs. The house has quoins and a moulded eaves cornice. There are two storeys, a symmetrical front of three bays, and a service wing. The central doorway is round-headed and has pilasters, a fanlight, impost moulding, a dated frieze, and a moulded cornice. Above it is a sash window with a rusticated surround, and it is flanked by two-storey canted bay windows with pilasters. The barn to the northeast contains a segmental archway.	II
Ashfield House; 53.78995°N 1.84544°W		c. 1860	A house in Italianate style, it is in sandstone on a plinth, with rusticated quoins, a moulded eaves cornice on console brackets, and a hipped slate roof. There are two storeys, and an entrance front of three bays. In the centre is a porch with Tuscan columns and a deep entablature, and the doorway has a radial glazed fanlight. The windows have architraves and cornices on console brackets, and the window above the porch has a pediment. The garden front has four bays, the left bay projecting.	II
West End Farmhouse; 53.80080°N 1.83128°W	—	c. 1860	A sandstone farmhouse with two storeys, an L-shaped plan, and saddlestones on the gables. It has Jacobean features, mullioned and transomed windows with hood moulds, and in the upper floor of the gable end is a window with a pointed arched head.	II
St James' Church, Thornton; 53.79089°N 1.84161°W		1870–72	The church is in sandstone and in Early English style. It consists of a nave with a clerestory, a south aisle, a south porch, a chancel, and a southeast steeple. The steeple has an unbuttressed two-stage tower with false machicolation and a broach spire. There are rose windows in the west end and the clerestory, and the other windows are lancets.	II
Great Northern Public House and coach house 53.79099°N 1.85584°W		1876–78	The public house and the coach house to the right are in sandstone with slate roofs and two storeys. The public house has three bays, on a plinth, with rusticated quoins, a frieze, and a moulded eaves cornice. The central doorway is round-arched with inner pilasters, a fanlight and a keystone, outer pilasters with Composite capitals, and an entablature with a dentilled cornice. The ground floor windows are paired, round-arched, divided by colonnettes with foliate caps, and with decorative keystones. In the upper floor the windows have cambered heads and architraves, the middle window also with a keystone. The coach house has a bracketed eaves cornice, the upper floor windows are round-arched, and have keystones and impost bands.	II
Thornton Railway Viaduct; 53.78882°N 1.85577°W		1876–78	The railway viaduct is in sandstone, and consists of 20 semicircular arches on slender tapering piers. There are string courses, and a band below the parapet.	II
St Peter's Church, Allerton; 53.80381°N 1.81863°W		1879	The church is in sandstone and in Early English style. It consists of a nave, a north porch, a chancel, and a west tower. The tower has three stages, buttresses, clock faces, an embattled parapet, and a pyramidal spire. The windows are lancets.	II
Allerton War Memorial; 53.80218°N 1.81460°W		1922	The war memorial is in an enclosed area in Ladyhill Park. It consists of a bronze statue depicting a dying or dead soldier supported by a female figure, and a youth holding a laurel crown. The statue is on a stone pedestal with a cornice, and the area is enclosed by railings.	II
Thornton War Memorial; 53.79208°N 1.86695°W		1922	The war memorial is in Thornton Cemetery, and it consists of a pylon of Yorkshire stone on a stone base. This is about 3.5 metres (11 ft) high, and on it is a bronze statue depicting the personification of Victory holding wreaths. On the front of the pylon are inscriptions, and on the sides are bronze plaques with the names of those lost in the two World Wars. Enclosing the memorial is a low stone kerb.	II
