= Bradford Beck =

River in Bradford, West Yorkshire, England

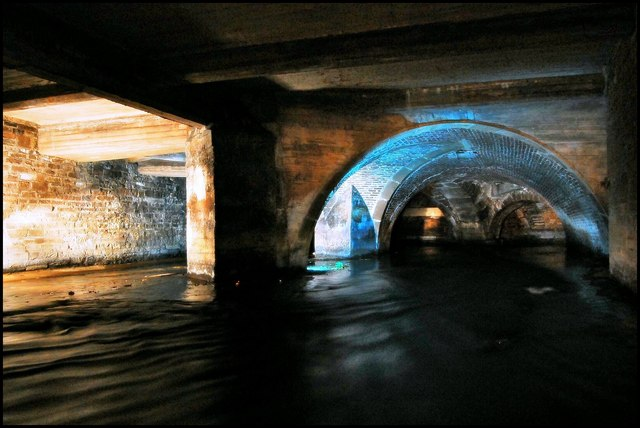
- The Cathedral arches beneath Centenary Square
- Etymology: Broad Ford Beck

Location
- Country: England
- City: Bradford, West Yorkshire

Physical characteristics
- Source
  - location: Clayton Beck, Cemetery Road, Lidget Green
  - coordinates: 53.79513°N 1.79189°W
  - elevation: 390 feet (120 m)
- Mouth
  - location: Dockfield, Shipley, West Yorkshire
  - coordinates: 53.83744°N 1.77212°W
  - elevation: 230 feet (70 m)
- Length: 6.8 mi (10.9 km)
- Basin size: 22 mi^{2} (57 km^{2})
- Discharge
  - location: Shipley
  - average: 21 cubic feet per second (0.6 m^{3}/s)
  - maximum: 1,210 cubic feet per second (34.3 m^{3}/s) (1984)

Basin features
- River system: River Aire
- Tributaries
  - left: Red Beck
  - right: Westbrook, Bowling Beck, Eastbrook, Trap Sike

Bradford Beck is a river that flows through Bradford, West Yorkshire, England, (then Bradford Dale) and on to the River Aire at Shipley. As it reaches Bradford city centre it runs underground after being built over in the 19th century. It is culverted as it runs from Bradford city centre to Queen's Road after which it runs mostly in an open channel to Shipley. The beck used to be known as the filthiest river in England.

Bradford itself is so named after a crossing on Bradford Beck (the Broad Ford) which was located near to what is present day Church Street in the city centre, with a crossing named as Broadstones. The beck is formed from a number of smaller watercourses, namely Pinch Beck, Pitty Beck, Middlebrook, Clayton Beck, Bull Greave Beck, Chellow Dene Beck, Westbrook, Dirkhill Beck, Bowling Beck, Eastbrook, Bolton Beck, Trap Sike, Northcliffe Beck and Red Beck.

== History ==
Anglo-Saxon Bradford was centred around a point where at least three streams converged. This was the site of two crossings – Ive Bridge and Church Bridge, where the parish church was located (later to become Bradford Cathedral). In medieval times, the waters from one of the streams feeding Bradford Beck were redirected to power mills in what is now the Sunbridge and Thornton Road areas. This section west of the city centre is known as Goitside.

A site north west of the parish church was the place where a ducking stool was kept on the beck. This was for the punishment of scolding and unruly women. On the eventual opening of the Bradford Arm of the Leeds and Liverpool Canal, the stool was removed and used on the canal instead. Water from Bradford Beck was used to supplement the low feedwaters going into the canal, however the canal was only supposed to take water from Bowling Beck, but as this proved insufficient, the polluted waters from Bradford Beck were used also. This turned the Bradford Canal into an open sewer. The pollution in the beck during the 19th century was legendary with it being described as the filthiest river in England, and Friedrich Engels described the beck in the 1840s as a "coal-black, foul-smelling stream".

The canal was subject to sulphureted hydrogen (hydrogen sulphide) bubbling up to the surface (especially in summer) and this condition made it very dangerous with at least one occasion when the canal was set alight. After complaints, specifically from those living and working on the Aire just east of Shipley, the Bradford Corporation was forced to act. They first set up a sewage plant at Frizinghall and then when this proved insufficient (after more communities became part of Bradford) another plant was opened up at Esholt.

The beck underwent a flood alleviation scheme in the early 1990s. A 12-foot (3.7 m) tunnel was constructed that runs west of Bradford Beck and the city centre and emerges in an open section into Bradford Beck near to Canal Road.

Despite the re-direction of sewage into brick lined channels and pipes in the 19th century, the beck remains polluted still. This is because of the numerous combined sewer overflow (CSO) points and other misconnected foul and drainage sewers. In 2018, it was reported that the beck had turned yellow due to pollutive waste from some of the curry houses in the city. It was noted that the establishments in question were not actively throwing their waste into the beck, but the simple act of washing up combined with the misconnected wastewater pipes meant that the beck was polluted again.

The beck is still unsuited to hosting wildlife, but after the Friends of Bradford's Becks set up a regeneration and cleaning programme for the beck in 2013, the waters are cleaner than they have been for a long time. The issue with the lack of wildlife now is that as the beck was culverted, it runs very fast through concrete and stone channels and as such the water flow is too fast to sustain much of the wildlife that would normally inhabit a beck of this size. The Friends of Bradford's Becks are wanting to rectify this by remodelling some of the lower reaches of the beck where it is exposed to daylight and slowing the water flow down by adding in bends.

== Description of route ==
The Environment Agency has determined that the watershed for Bradford Beck is 22 square miles (58 km^{2}) and has divided the beck into two sections; the upper part is actually Clayton Beck and the urban part (Bradford Beck proper) is from where Clayton Beck passes underneath Cemetery Road in Bradford at Lidget Green. From here to the outfall point into the River Aire at Shipley it is 6.8 miles (11 km).

Where the route passes through Bradford city centre in a culvert, it is to be marked by a series of carved plaques set into the ground by the Friends of Bradford's Becks. The first three plaques were unveiled inside and just outside The Broadway shopping centre at the end of 2015, and the rest are to be installed during 2016. The beck runs eastwards from the Bradford moorland and in the vicinity of the cathedral, it meets Bowling Beck and Eastbrook before it turns 90° to the north.

After the city centre, there are some open air sections, but the beck is mostly covered over until Queen's Road. Thereafter to Shipley, the beck is largely exposed and accompanied by signage warning of contaminated water. The Friends of Bradford's Becks have amended these signs to take away the negative effect of their warnings as the water is of a better quality now than when the signs were erected in the 1970s. The beck passes underneath the railway lines at the east end of Shipley railway station and the A657 road at the same point and enters the south side of the River Aire at Dockfield in Shipley. The average flow into the River Aire is 21 cubic feet per second (0.6 m^{3}/s) with one extreme flood event in 1984 recording an outflow of 1,210 cubic feet per second (34.3 m^{3}/s).

== Ecology and environment ==
In 2009, the Environment Agency classified the beck as being of good chemical, but poor ecological quality. A 2012 survey of the water and its tributaries, found high levels of Phosphates, Ammonia and metals present in the water. Combined Sewer Overflows (CSOs) along the beck and crucially further upstream, allow runoff and pollutants to enter the watercourse particularly in times of high rainfall and flood.

A study by the Wild Trout Trust in 2012 noted that the beck was of poor ecological quality in terms of supporting marine life. There are too many weirs and obstacles to prevent trout and other fish to navigate upstream of the beck in its present condition. A trial was held on the beck in 2015 which utilised tampons as detection points for sewage entering the beck. As the tampons do not have optical brighteners, several were left along the beck and then checked under a UV light; those that had absorbed optical brighteners did so from household pollution, which narrowed down where water company officials needed to search for causes of pollution.

In April 2019, the Environment Agency re-opened an investigation into a company that had allowed pollution into the beck in August 2018. Whilst the company had already been prosecuted and remedial action taken, The Friends of Bradford's Becks asked for another investigation to be carried out, as in their opinion, the punitive measures taken against the company did not go far enough. The pollution incident was alleged to have turned the water black and killed wildlife.

== Navigation ==
The beck is not navigable to boats at any point, however because of its underground nature, it does attract people wishing to explore the subterranean environment beneath the city. It has even featured in a National Geographic article on 11 rivers forced underground, which includes watercourses in New York, Moscow and Vienna.

== In popular culture ==
F.W. Moorman's nineteenth century dialect poem "A Dalesman's Litany" has the lines "I've seen snow drift down Bradford Beck/As black as ebony".

Eddie Lawler has sung about Bradford Beck on his 2002 CD, 'Bradford Beck'. The Friends of Bradford's Becks held a poetry competition with the winning entry getting lines from their poem carved into 15 stone plaques that follow the route above ground in the city centre.
