= Bradford Canal =

Disused canal in Yorkshire, England

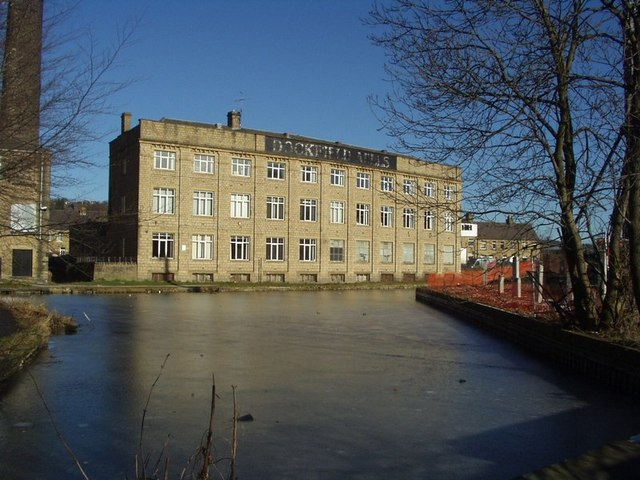
- The remains of the Bradford Canal where it joined the Leeds and Liverpool

Specifications
- Maximum boat length: 66 ft 0 in (20.12 m)
- Maximum boat beam: 15 ft 2 in (4.62 m)
- Locks: 10
- Status: Destroyed

History
- Original owner: Bradford Canal Company
- Date of act: 1771
- Date completed: 1774
- Date closed: 1922

Geography
- Start point: Shipley
- End point: Bradford
- Branch of: Leeds & Liverpool Canal

The Bradford Canal was a 3 1/2-mile (5.6 km) English canal which ran from the Leeds and Liverpool Canal at Shipley into the centre of Bradford. It opened in 1774, and was closed in 1866, when it was declared to be a public health hazard. Four years later it reopened with a better water supply, and closed for the second time in 1922. It was subsequently filled in, although consideration has been given to restoring it. There are some remains, including a short section of canal at the junction and a pumping station building, which is now a dwelling.

== History ==
The first plans to provide a navigable route to Bradford were made in 1744, when a number of Gentlemen and Farmers sought parliamentary approval for improvements to 18 miles (29 km) of the River Aire, starting at Inghay Bridge, near Skipton, and ending at Cottingley Bridge, near Bingley, which was the nearest point on the river from which an existing road ran to Bradford. Although the bill reached the committee stage, nothing more became of it.

Bradford to Idle Canal Act 1771
- Act of Parliament
- Parliament of Great Britain
- Long title: An Act for making a navigable Cut or Canal from Bradford to join the Leeds and Liverpoole Canal, at Windhill, in the Township of Idle, in the County of York.
- Citation: 11 Geo. 3. c. 89
- Territorial extent: Great Britain

Dates
- Royal assent: 29 April 1771
- Commencement: 13 November 1770 (Note: Start of session.)

Status: Current legislation

Text of statute as originally enacted

When the Leeds and Liverpool Canal was promoted in the 1760s, its course between Skipton and Bingley broadly followed that proposed by the 1744 plan. It was authorised in 1770, and in the same year fourteen merchants, including six who were already on the committee for the Leeds and Liverpool, planned a branch which would serve the town of Bradford. An act of Parliament, the Bradford to Idle Canal Act 1771 (11 Geo. 3. c. 89) was obtained on 29 April 1771, which appointed 28 proprietors. They could raise £6,000 in capital by issuing shares, with a further £3,000 if needed, to be used to construct a canal from Shipley to a place in Bradford called Hoppy Bridge, which is now below Forster Square. They could also build reservoirs, and take water from various brooks.

The canal ran for 3 1/2 miles (5.6 km), dropping by 86 feet (26 m) through 10 locks on its way from Bradford to Shipley. Abraham Balme, one of the original promoters, oversaw the construction, with John Longbotham giving engineering advice. The locks on the canal were 66 by 15.2 feet (20.1 by 4.6 m), and could accommodate boats drawing 5 feet (1.5 m). The sizes were the same as those of the neighbouring Leeds and Liverpool. The work was completed by March 1774, when Mr Balme paid for the bell ringers of Bradford to ring out his arrival by boat. The Leeds and Liverpool opened from Bingley to Thackley in the same month. The opening was a year later than planned, and the canal had cost £9,424 14s 2d to build, about £3,500 over budget.

Initially the main cargo was stone, as a number of kilns were built beside the canal by the Bradford Lime Kiln Company and limestone was brought from Skipton. Coal pit owners on the south side of Bradford in Broomfields and Bowling built tramways into the town, but there was no direct connection with the canal as possible routes were blocked by buildings. In about 1790 the newly established Bowling Iron Works constructed a wagon-way from its works in Bowling to Staithes at Golden Lyon Yard about 200 yards (183 m) south of the canal basin. Finished iron products and coal were exported from the town by the canal via the wagon-way. The carriage of wool from Australia was an important source of revenue from the 1820s, and from 1828, packet boats carried passengers to Selby and Leeds.

=== Difficulties ===
Water supply was a significant issue for the canal company. As Bradford grew, the basin was surrounded by housing, and pollution from sewage occurred. Further down, mills drew water from the canal, used it for industrial processes, and returned it to the canal. The company had bought up tracts of land at the end of the 18th century, to obtain water rights, and had dammed Bradford Beck, despite the fact that their authorising act of Parliament had specifically excluded it as a source of water. The Bradford Board of Surveyors commented on the filth and stench in a report made in 1844, and an outbreak of cholera five years later, in which 406 people died, prompted the city council to take action. A wide-ranging sanitation bill was prepared, which included a clause to buy the canal and close it. The action would be funded by a £100,000 public loan. The bill went before Parliament, but concerted opposition by the Leeds and Liverpool Canal, the Aire and Calder Navigation, the Bradford Canal and other industrialists succeeded in reducing the amount of the loan to £50,000, which was insufficient to enable the canal to be purchased.

Hot weather in 1864 led to a fund being opened, so that a court order could be used to close the canal, on the basis that it was a public nuisance. A local newspaper, The Bradford Observer, described it as "that seething cauldron of all impurity, the Bradford Canal." Although the company argued that the water was polluted before it entered the canal, an injunction prevented them from taking water from the Bradford Beck after 6 November 1866. An offer by the Leeds and Liverpool Canal to take it over and clean it up was rejected by those who had brought the court order. Closure was postponed until 1 May 1867, while both the Bradford Company and the Leeds and Liverpool attempted to obtain an act of Parliament, but both failed, and so the canal closed and was drained.

With no means to transport their stone, several merchants started to negotiate with the Leeds and Liverpool, the Aire and Calder and Bradford Council. A new company, called the Bradford Canal Company Limited, was formed, and bought most of the canal from the old company for £2,500. The section above Northbrook Bridge was sold to developers, and on 21 March 1870, the old company was wound up. The new company expected to get a water supply from two reservoirs and three streams, and hoped to supplement this with a pipeline running from the top of the Leeds and Liverpool's Bingley locks. This suggestion was refused, and they resorted to building steam pumping engines at each lock, to pump water up the canal. The section from Shipley to Oliver Lock was reopened in 1872, five years to the day since it had closed, and the top section was reopened the following April. Although the stone traffic, which had been around 125,000 tons per year prior to closure, returned, most of the other traffic had moved to the railway, and did not.

Bradford Canal (Transfer) Act 1878
- Act of Parliament
- Parliament of the United Kingdom
- Long title: An Act to authorise the transfer of the Canal Property of the Bradford Canal Company, Limited, to the Company of Proprietors of the Canal Navigation from Leeds to Liverpool and the undertakers of the Aire and Calder Navigation; and for other purposes.
- Citation: 41 & 42 Vict. c. clvi

Dates
- Royal assent: 4 July 1878

Text of statute as originally enacted

Bradford Canal (Abandonment) Act 1922
- Act of Parliament
- Parliament of the United Kingdom
- Long title: An Act to authorise the Leeds and Liverpool Canal Company and the undertakers of the Aire and Calder Navigation to abandon the Bradford Canal and to sell or dispose of the site thereof and of the property connected therewith and for other purposes.
- Citation: 12 & 13 Geo. 5. c. xxix

Dates
- Royal assent: 29 June 1922

Text of statute as originally enacted

Receipts were inadequate to make the canal pay, and so the owners sold it to a coalition of the Leeds and Liverpool Canal and the Aire and Calder Navigation. They received £27,000, and the buyers also redeemed a £5,000 mortgage. The sale was authorised by the Bradford Canal (Transfer) Act 1878 (41 & 42 Vict. c. clvi), and the new Bradford Canal Company was dissolved. Traffic rose from 80,674 tons in 1888 to 102,390 tons in 1910, but profits were minimal due to the cost of maintenance. Traffic decreased during the First World War, and was down to 38,821 tons in 1920. With no obvious way to return the canal to profit, a bill to abandon the canal was submitted to Parliament in 1921, but was opposed by West Riding County Council, Bradford Corporation, and the Bradford Chamber of Commerce. A second attempt the following year was successful, with the Bradford Canal (Abandonment) Act 1922 (12 & 13 Geo. 5. c. xxix) being passed in June 1922. Closure occurred on 25 June, with just the section from the Leeds and Liverpool canal to the bottom of the first lock being retained, to be used as moorings. Subsequently, much of the canal's route has been built upon and filled in. Apart from the junction, several of the bridges which once spanned it are still visible in whole or in part. Near the site of the first lock is a lock keepers cottage and the pumping station building, which has been restored and is used as a dwelling.

== Regeneration plan ==
In the early years of the 21st century, there is a plan to rebuild the Bradford Canal. Among of the many projects conceived in connection with Bradford's bid to be European Capital of Culture for 2008 (which competition was actually won by Liverpool), one was a scheme to recreate the Bradford Canal. In 2004 Bradford Council, British Waterways, and Bradford Centre Regeneration jointly established a committee to investigate the possibilities of a new canal. According to "Canal Road News", a full feasibility study has "concluded that reinstating Bradford Canal is feasible, represents value for money, and opens considerable development opportunities along the five-kilometre canal corridor".

Issue 1 of "Canal Road News" shows a map of the proposed canal: it more or less follows the original path from the Leeds and Liverpool Canal as far as Queens Road bridge. But south of that bridge the map shows it crossing Canal Road, and continuing on the west (city) side of that road, past the Conditioning House and finishing at the proposed Channel Urban Village. The plan shows 11 locks. Another noteworthy item on the map, not directly related to the canal, is a potential Manningham station on the Airedale Line.

According to a newspaper article of April 2006, "Ambitious plans for a new canal between Shipley and Bradford have been given a cautious welcome by members of the construction industry. … After the presentation, many of the audience said the plans were exciting and could stimulate regeneration. But others were more cautious and questioned where funding would come from." By April 2010, Bradford Council owned 63 per cent of the route of the renewed canal, and was considering how best to acquire the rest, which was in private ownership at the time. A feasibility study by the civil engineers Arup and the architects Lathams identified the potential for regeneration that such a scheme would have.

== Points of interest ==
Point	Coordinates (Links to map resources)	OS Grid Ref	Notes
Bradford	53.793°N 1.750°W	SE164331	Hoppy Bridge
Shipley	53.835°N 1.776°W	SE148376	Junction with Leeds and Liverpool

== See also ==
- Canals of the United Kingdom
- History of the British canal system

== Bibliography ==
- Canal Link (2005). "The rebirth of Bradford Canal" (PDF). Bradford Council. Archived from the original (PDF) on 21 February 2007.
- Firth, Gary (1990). Bradford and the Industrial Revolution. Ryburn Publishing. ISBN 978-1-85331-010-2.
- Hadfield, Charles; Biddle, Gordon (1970). The Canals of North West England (Vol 1). David and Charles. ISBN 0-7153-4956-2.
- Kilner, Will (28 April 2006). "Mixed reaction to canal plans". Bradford Telegraph and Argus. Archived from the original on 11 December 2020.
- Priestley, Joseph (1831). Historical Account of the Navigable Rivers, Canals, and Railways, of Great Britain. Archived from the original on 12 March 2016.
