= Thornton, West Yorkshire =

Village in West Yorkshire, England

Coordinates: 53.7898°N 1.8504°W

Thornton
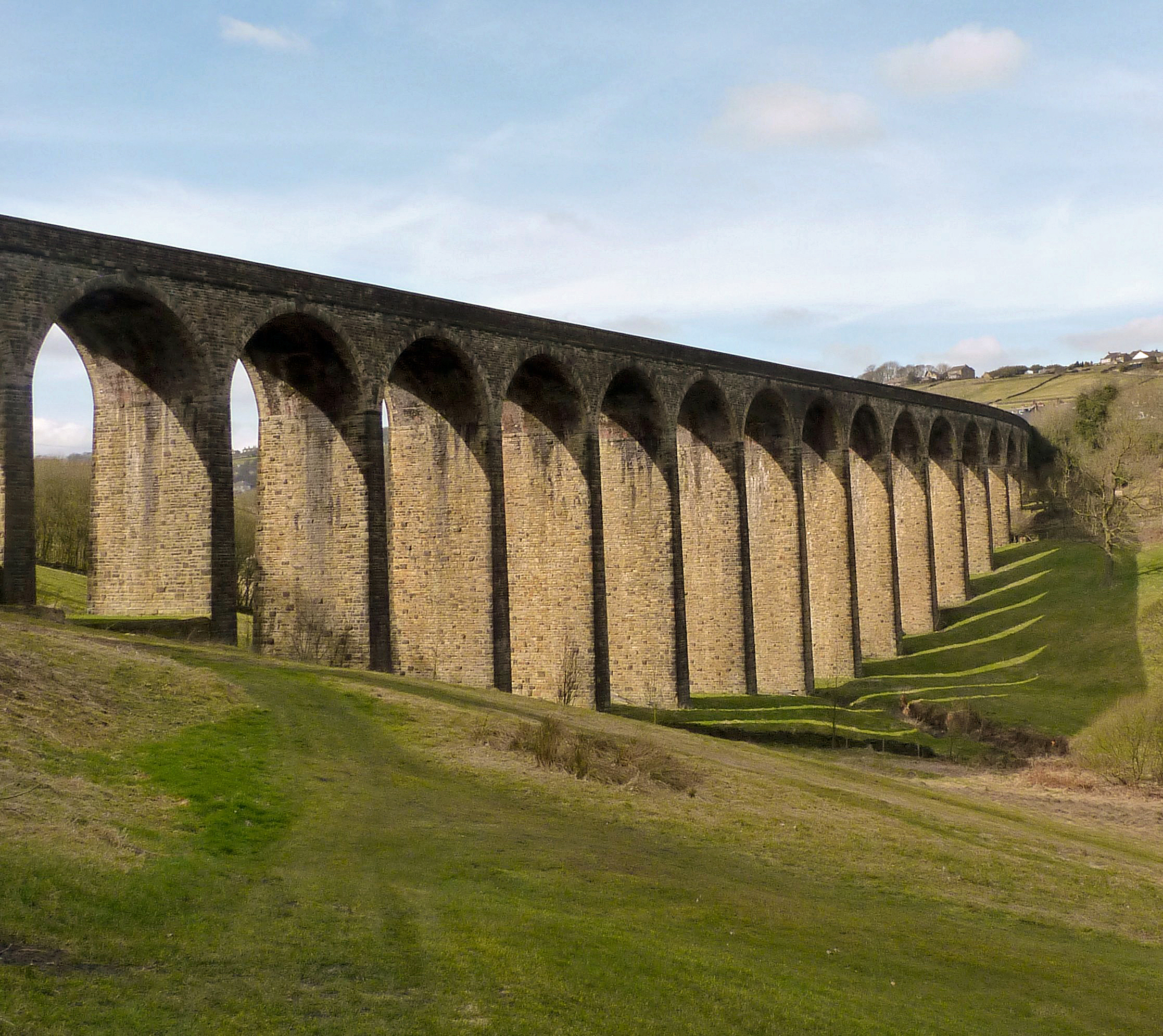
- Thornton Viaduct

- Location within West Yorkshire
- Population: 17,276 (Thornton and Allerton ward. 2011 census)
- OS grid reference: SE098326
- Metropolitan borough: City of Bradford
- Metropolitan county: West Yorkshire
- Region: Yorkshire and the Humber
- Country: England
- Sovereign state: United Kingdom
- Post town: BRADFORD
- Postcode district: BD13
- Dialling code: 01274
- Police: West Yorkshire
- Fire: West Yorkshire
- Ambulance: Yorkshire
- UK Parliament: Bradford West

Thornton is a village and former civil parish, within the metropolitan borough of the City of Bradford, in West Yorkshire, England. It lies 6 miles (9.7 km) to the west of the city centre of Bradford, and together with neighbouring Allerton, had a total resident population in 2001 of 15,004, increasing to 17,276 in 2011 and 18,520 in 2021. (Note: This population refers to the entirety of the Thornton and Allerton ward, including Sandy Lane and Keelham, rather than Thornton itself; Thornton proper has approximately 5-6,000 residents as of 2021.) Its most famous residents were the Brontës.

The preserved centre of the village retains the character of a typical Pennine village, with stone-built houses with stone flagged roofs. The surrounding areas consist of more modern housing, particularly towards the eastern and western edges of the village, still isolated from the rest of the city of Bradford by green fields.

== Geography and administration ==
Thornton derives from Old English and means a thorn tree at a farm or settlement. It was mentioned in the Domesday Book of the 11th century, when it had been laid waste by William the Conqueror's harrying of the North, punishment for an uprising against the Norman invaders of 1066.

Thornton was formerly a township and chapelry in the parish of Bradford, becoming a civil parish in its own right in 1866. In 1865 Thornton was declared to be a Local Government District, administered by a local board. Such local boards became urban district councils under the Local Government Act 1894. Thornton Urban District existed for less than five years; in 1899 it was incorporated into the city of Bradford. The civil parish of Thornton continued to exist until 1974, but as an urban parish it had no parish council, being directly administered by the city council. In 1951 the parish had a population of 6097.

The parish was abolished in 1974 when the larger City of Bradford metropolitan borough was created, since when it has been an unparished area. Thornton comprises part of the Thornton and Allerton ward. It falls within the parliamentary constituency of Bradford West.

Its elevation, poor soils, isolation from major transport routes, and rainfall of close to 1000mm per year has limited its farming productivity. Resources such as coal, iron and sandstone, the development of turnpike roads, and the coming of the railways enabled Thornton to share in the prosperity generated by the 19th-century wool worsted trade. The increasing use of steam-powered mills (at the expense of the former cottage-industry production methods) concentrated production in the valleys of the city centre. Foreign imports, the Second World War, and closure of the railways, all contributed to the decline in manufacturing. Today, Thornton is often treated as a residential suburb of Bradford.

The main thoroughfare through the village was Market Street, until this road was bypassed in 1826 by the new Thornton Road (B6145). In the two centuries after its construction, most building work has since taken place along Thornton Road, extending the village down the slope of the hill it sits upon. This has left Market Street largely untouched and it retains its original character and stonework on the buildings. Market Street therefore forms the backbone of the conservation area in the village, while Thornton Road remains the main artery for traffic to Bradford, Allerton, Halifax, Keighley and Denholme.

== Notable residents ==
- Thornton's most famous residents were the Brontës. The Rev Patrick Brontë became the incumbent of Thornton Chapel in 1815, and Charlotte, Branwell, Emily and Anne Brontë were born at 74 Market Street before the family moved to Haworth.

In November 2023 the house was purchased by a campaign group which aims to restore and preserve the house as the Brontë Birthplace. The remains of the church where the father preached, known as the Bell Chapel, can be seen in the restored old graveyard off Thornton Road opposite the current church. The 44 mi (71 km) long Brontë Way passes through Thornton on its way between Gawthorpe Hall in Lancashire and Oakwell Hall in the Birstall area.

- Professional wrestler Les Kellett with his wife Margaret had a smallholding and café called "The Terminus", where trolleybuses terminated before returning to Bradford. On 2 acres (0.81 ha) behind the house Kellett sometimes bred pigs and once said he kept fifty head of cattle.

== Thornton Viaduct ==
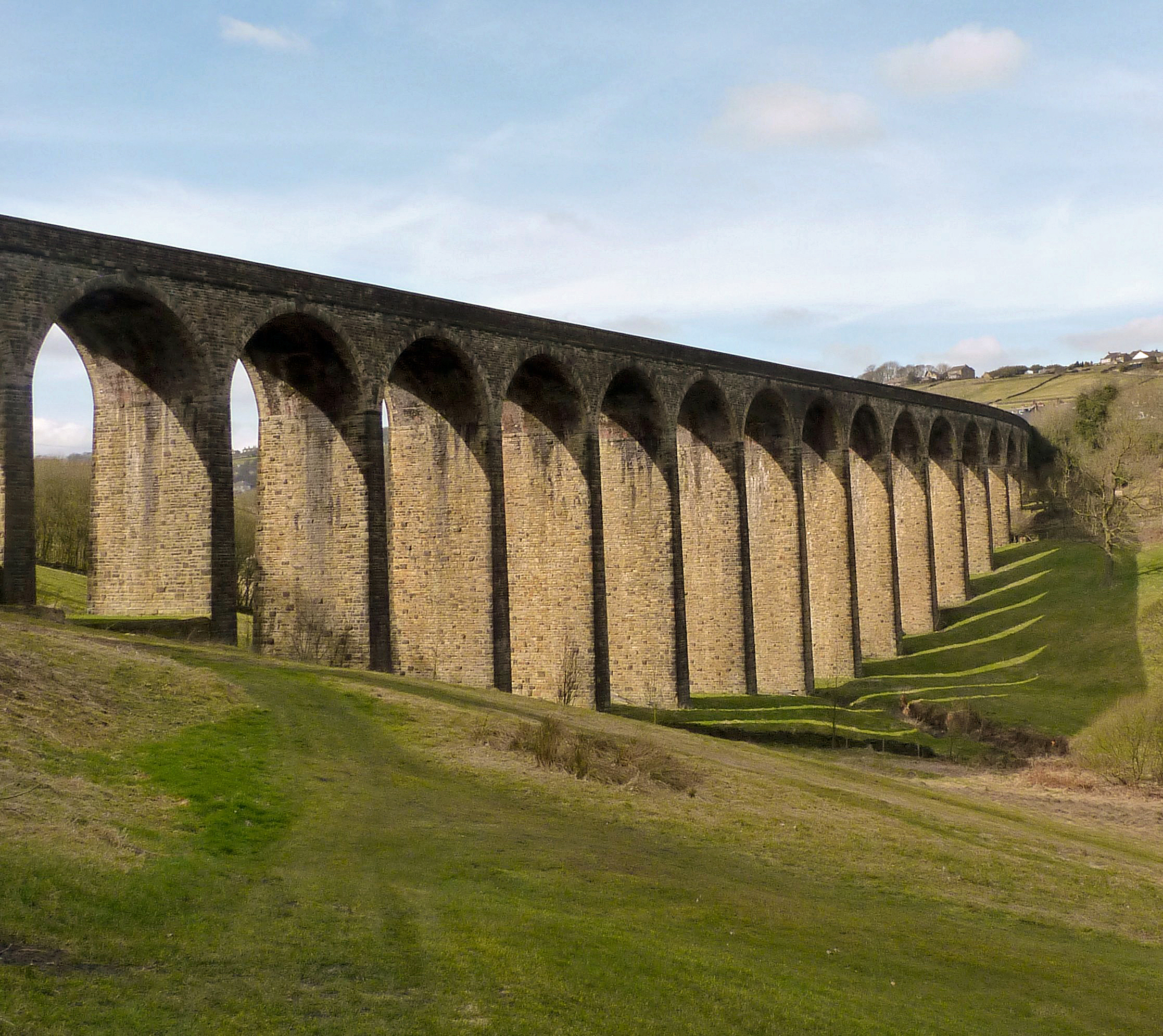
Thornton Viaduct, as seen from the 7th green of Headley Golf Club

Thornton Viaduct was a railway viaduct for the Great Northern Railway line running from Queensbury to Keighley via Thornton. It was built in an S-shape to allow a smooth access to Thornton railway station. The viaduct is now a Grade II listed building.

The viaduct was reopened as part of The Great Northern Railway Trail between Cullingworth and Queensbury along the track bed in 2009, with a final link up to Queensbury opening in 2012.

== See also ==
- Beckfoot Thornton
- Listed buildings in Thornton and Allerton, West Yorkshire
