= Allerton, West Yorkshire =

Village in Bradford, West Yorkshire, England

Coordinates: 53.80°N 01.83°W

Allerton
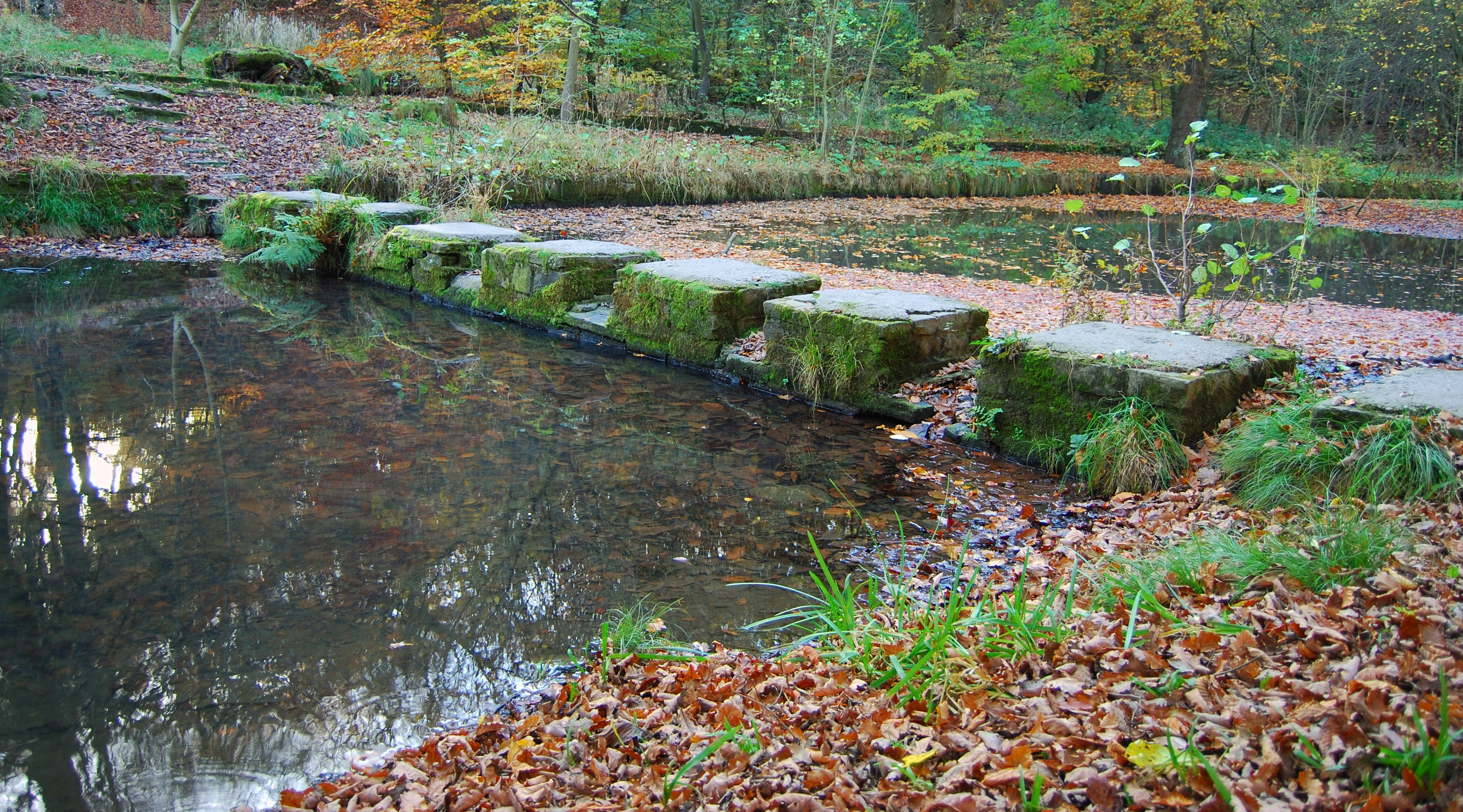
- Stepping stones at Pitty Beck, south Allerton

- Location within West Yorkshire
- Population: 12,000
- OS grid reference: SE1134
- Metropolitan borough: City of Bradford
- Metropolitan county: West Yorkshire
- Region: Yorkshire and the Humber
- Country: England
- Sovereign state: United Kingdom
- Post town: BRADFORD
- Postcode district: BD15
- Dialling code: 01274
- Police: West Yorkshire
- Fire: West Yorkshire
- Ambulance: Yorkshire
- UK Parliament: Bradford West

Allerton is a village within the metropolitan borough of the City of Bradford, West Yorkshire, England, now increasingly part of the Bradford conurbation. With a population of around 12,000, the village is situated 3 miles west-north-west of Bradford.

Allerton was recorded in the Domesday Book as Wilsden-cum-Allerton. The local residents of the suburb pronounce it as Ollerton, using 'Ol' rather than 'Al'.

== Geography and history ==
Allerton derives from Old English, and means an alder tree at a farm or settlement. Allerton is mentioned as a settlement worth 2 pounds, 10 shillings to the Lord, Ilbert of Lacy, in 1066. It is also known that the settlement was waste in the 11th century, probably due to the Harrying of the North that was led by William the Conqueror as a retaliation to Viking-influenced rebellions in the North of England at the time.

Chellow Dean is a local beauty spot at the north of Allerton. It is a wooded valley with two Victorian reservoirs, and is a haven for local wildlife. A significant amount of the village, mostly towards the south, was built in the decades following the Second World War as council housing and thus it contains over half of the population of the Thornton and Allerton ward, towards the western periphery of Bradford.

In 1825, on the eastern fringes of the village with Bradford, the Bradford Public Dispensary opened at Darley Street, moved to Westgate as the Bradford Infirmary in 1843. The hospital became the Bradford Royal Infirmary (known as BRI to locals) in commemoration of Queen Victoria's Diamond Jubilee. This joined the National Health Service in 1948.

Allerton Shopping Centre

Seabrook Potato Crisps was founded in 1945 in Bradford, and the company opened its first factory in Allerton in 1956 when Charles and Colin Brook converted the old Allerton liberal club into their factory. The company's Allerton factory closed in 2004 and was finally demolished in 2015 following a fire, in 2016 an Aldi store was built on the site, production then moved to the company's Princeville site, also in Bradford. Thornton Labour Club was situated in the south-west of Allerton until it was demolished in the 1990s or 2000s.

A new housing development on the immediate western edge of the village - known as Heron's Reach - consisting of nearly 300 houses, began construction at the end of 2016. The development had previously been cancelled following opposition from local ward councillors and residents, and remains controversial, due to its situation on a green belt site, and its overbearing reliance on the rural road adjacent to its eastern edge.

== Education ==
There are a number of primary schools in the village; these include the Academy at St. James at the southern edge of the village, Beckfoot Allerton on Allerton Road, St. Matthew's Catholic Primary School and Ley Top Primary School in close proximity at the top of Bell Dean Road, as well as Sandy Lane Primary School in the village of Sandy Lane attached to the immediate north-west of Allerton.

Dixon's Allerton Academy is situated at the far eastern edge of the village, close to the Rhodesway estate.

== Governance ==
Allerton has been within the boundaries of the City of Bradford metropolitan borough since 1974 as part of the Thornton and Allerton electoral ward. It falls within the parliamentary constituency of Bradford West, a Labour safe seat. Allerton currently has three Labour councillors, who preside over the entire of the Thornton and Allerton wards, whose population primarily are within the village.

Allerton was formerly a township in the parish of Bradford, in 1866 Allerton became a separate civil parish, on 25 March 1898 the parish was abolished and merged with Bradford. In 1891 the parish had a population of 3916.

== Chellow Dene ==
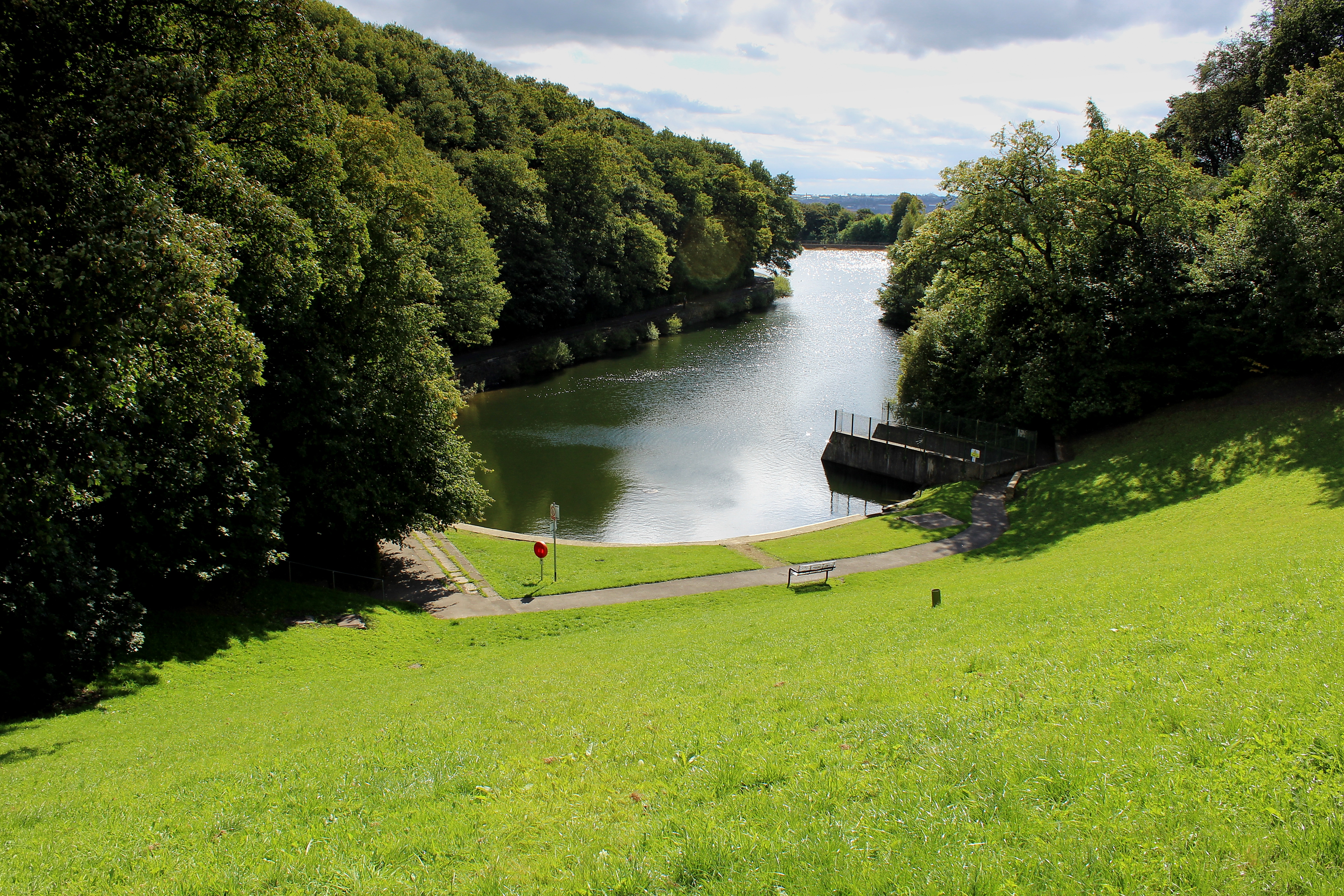
Chellow Dene Reservoir, Allerton

A local beauty spot to the northern edge of Allerton is Chellow Dene, which is a long, narrow woodland which surrounds two reservoirs. It is highly popular with dogwalkers, who frequent the paths that loop around the reservoirs, however the route can be more treacherous further north and upland towards the golf course adjacent to Chellow Heights and Heaton. Chellow Dean is just over thirty-three acres in area.

== Notable people ==
- Dean Cavanagh (born 1966), writer for screen, film and theatre
- Nicky Evans (born 1979), actor appearing as Roy Glover in Emmerdale and Shane Maguire in Shameless
- Kimberley Walsh (born 1981), singer from all-female band Girls Aloud

== See also ==
- Listed buildings in Thornton and Allerton, West Yorkshire
