= Horton, Bradford =

Horton, Bradford may refer to:

- Little Horton, Bradford
- Great Horton, Bradford
  - Great Horton railway station, Bradford
- Horton Park, Bradford
  - Horton Park railway station, Bradford
