= Clayton railway station (England) =

Disused railway station in West Yorkshire, England

Clayton

General information
- Location: Clayton, City of Bradford; England
- Coordinates: 53.780950°N 1.816030°W
- Grid reference: SE122316
- Platforms: 2

Other information
- Status: Disused

History
- Original company: Bradford and Thornton Railway
- Pre-grouping: Great Northern Railway
- Post-grouping: London and North Eastern Railway

Key dates
- 14 October 1878: Station opened
- 23 May 1955: Station closed for passengers
- 10 April 1961: closed for goods
Location

Clayton railway station was on the Great Northern Railway lines to Bradford, Keighley and Halifax via Queensbury, collectively known as the Queensbury Lines.

== History ==
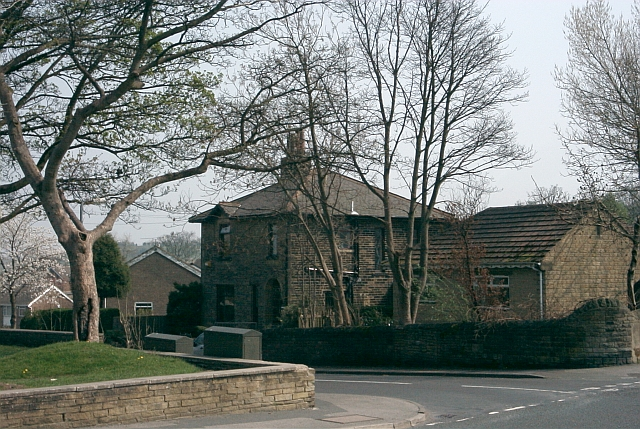
Former station master's house

The station served the village of Clayton in West Yorkshire, England. The station had an island platform and a reasonable goods yard. The station opened for passengers in 1878 and closed in 1955, but the goods yard and tunnel remained open as a through route. The goods services ceased in 1961, and the route to Thornton Station remained in use until 1965 when it closed completely and the tracks were torn up. The cutting and station site have been infilled and houses erected on the site. The Bradford portal of Clayton Tunnel has also been infilled.

== Clayton tunnel ==
Clayton tunnel lay immediately west of Clayton railway station. During the construction of the 1,057-yard-long (967 m) tunnel in 1874, two workers were killed when their lift fell down No1 shaft. The man operating the lift was found to be drunk at the time of the accident. The tunnel's eastern approach cutting has been infilled and built on since the railway's closure and, in 2012, cannabis was found being cultivated inside after a routine inspection by Carillion on behalf of British Railways Board (Residuary).

Preceding station	Disused railways	Following station
Queensbury	Great Northern Railway; Queensbury lines	Great Horton
