= Queensbury Tunnel =

Disused railway tunnel in West Yorkshire, England

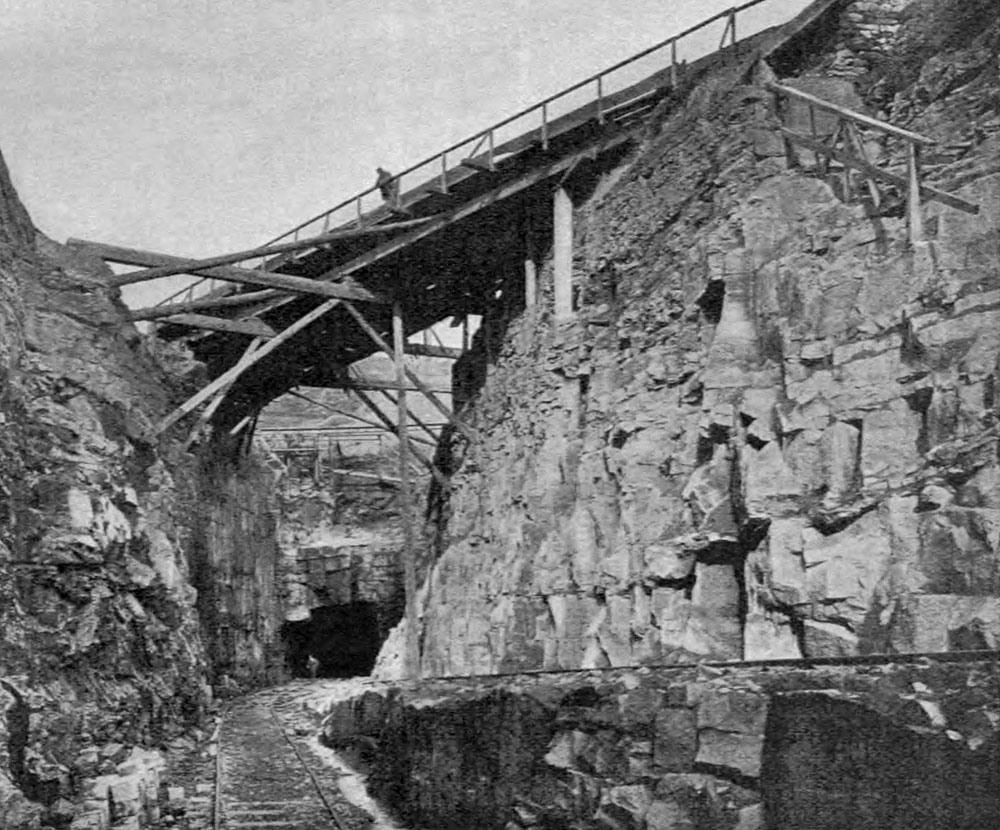
- The southern entrance to Queensbury Tunnel during its construction in the 1870s.
- Interactive map of Queensbury Tunnel

Overview
- Line: Queensbury Lines
- Location: West Yorkshire, England
- Coordinates: Northern portal: 53.7739°N 1.8437°W; Southern portal: 53.7597°N 1.8688°W
- Status: Disused

Operation
- Work began: 21 May 1874
- Constructed: 1874–1878
- Opened: 14 October 1878
- Closed: 28 May 1956
- Owner: Department for Transport

Technical
- Design engineer: John Fraser
- Length: 2,501 m (8,205 ft)
- Tunnel clearance: 6.4 m (21 ft)
- Width: 7.9 m (26 ft)
- Grade: 1% (1:100)

Queensbury Tunnel is a disused railway tunnel that connects Holmfield and Queensbury in West Yorkshire, England. It was built by the Great Northern Railway (GNR) and, at 2,501 yd (2,287 m) in length, was the longest on the company's network at the time of its opening in 1878. The line through the tunnel closed in 1956.

The tunnel is owned by the Department for Transport and maintained on its behalf by National Highways' Historical Railways Estate (HRE) team.

Controversy has surrounded the future of the tunnel for several years. The Queensbury Tunnel Society (QTS), supported by cycling groups, environmental campaigners and two local councils, is seeking to reopen it as part of a greenway linking Bradford and Halifax. However, Highways England is progressing plans to abandon the structure due to concerns over its condition; this would result in some sections being infilled.

In September 2019, Queensbury Tunnel was named on The Victorian Society's list of the Top 10 Most Endangered Buildings in England and Wales for 2019.

== Construction ==
Queensbury Tunnel was one of several major engineering feats on the Halifax, Thornton and Keighley Railway; it is one of the so-called Queensbury Lines. Plans for this route were placed before Parliament in 1873, with Royal Assent being granted on 5 August after several months of debate. Benton and Woodiwiss, a company with a longstanding association with the GNR, were the contractors.

The southern end of the tunnel was north of Holmfield. The route was 3.6 km (2.25 mi) of Railway No.3 to the northern portal just south of the triangular station of Queensbury. Trains could diverge to either Bradford Exchange or Keighley. The Great Northern Railway appointed John Fraser as engineer whilst his son Henry acted as resident engineer. Work on the northernmost of the construction shafts got underway in May 1874. It was originally intended that eight shafts would be sunk, however their spacing was changed at an early stage, resulting in No.7 shaft not being progressed. The contract required the tunnel to be completed within two years, but this proved impossible due to significant water ingress forcing the abandonment of two other shafts, including No.5 which would have been the deepest at 126 m (414 ft).

In July 1877, Colonel Frederick Beaumont, chairman of the Diamond Rock Boring Company, brought a rock drilling machine to Queensbury which was used to speed up the driving of headings (pilot tunnels) from the bottom of No.4 shaft. This improved the productivity of the miners by four or five-fold and resulted in the breakthrough of a continuous heading from one end of the tunnel to the other on 2 October 1877, although there was still a need to excavate the tunnel to full size and construct the lining.

Structural work on the tunnel was finished in July 1878. The last brick was inserted by the inspector, James Albrighton, who had supervised work on the tunnel from the outset. The event was marked by the flying of colours from the headgear of No.4 shaft, following which the Great Northern Railway entertained 300 of the workmen to a dinner.

At least ten men died during construction of the tunnel. Miners Henry Jones, 39, and John Gough, 40, were killed when a charge exploded as they attempted to withdraw it. Of the others, Richard Sutcliffe was struck by a cage which fell down a shaft, John Swire was run over by wagons, Henry Ingham drowned at the bottom of a shaft, Sutcliffe Hodgson fell down a shaft, Richard Jones was crushed by falling rock, Llewellyn Jones was injured in an explosion and succumbed to tetanus, Frederick Goulding was crushed by a wagon, and Captain Pickles was struck on the head by a large timber.

== Operational period ==
Railway No.3 was inspected by Major General C. S. Hutchinson on behalf of the Board of Trade on 11 October 1878, stating that "I must report that by reason of the incompleteness of the work (viz. the want of a terminal station) the Halifax, Thornton and Keighley Railway and its westerly fork cannot be opened for passenger traffic without danger to the public". Goods trains started to use the line almost immediately, but passenger services were not introduced until 1 December 1879.

In 1882, defects were found in the arch and sidewalls at several locations through the tunnel, caused by poor workmanship and the effects of adjacent mine workings. This resulted in the imposition of single-line working for the first nine months of 1883 whilst repairs were carried out. Subsidence and water ingress continued to have an impact during the tunnel's operational period, prompting an extensive programme of patch repairs to the arch in the 1920s and the relining of No.3 shaft in 1934.

In April 1906, foreman ganger Sam Hirst was knocked down by a train in the tunnel and lost one of his feet. On the night of 24 March 1944, fireman Henry Kilner looked out of the cab as his train approached the tunnel, resulting in him striking his head on the brickwork. He sustained lacerations and concussion.

Although passenger revenue declined due to tram and bus competition, freight traffic remained relatively buoyant until the 1940s. However, the high cost of maintenance, in part due to Queensbury Tunnel, made the line a prime candidate for closure as part of post-war economy measures. With passenger services already withdrawn, the section of line from Holmfield to Queensbury West closed on 28 May 1956. Track lifting through the tunnel took place in 1963.

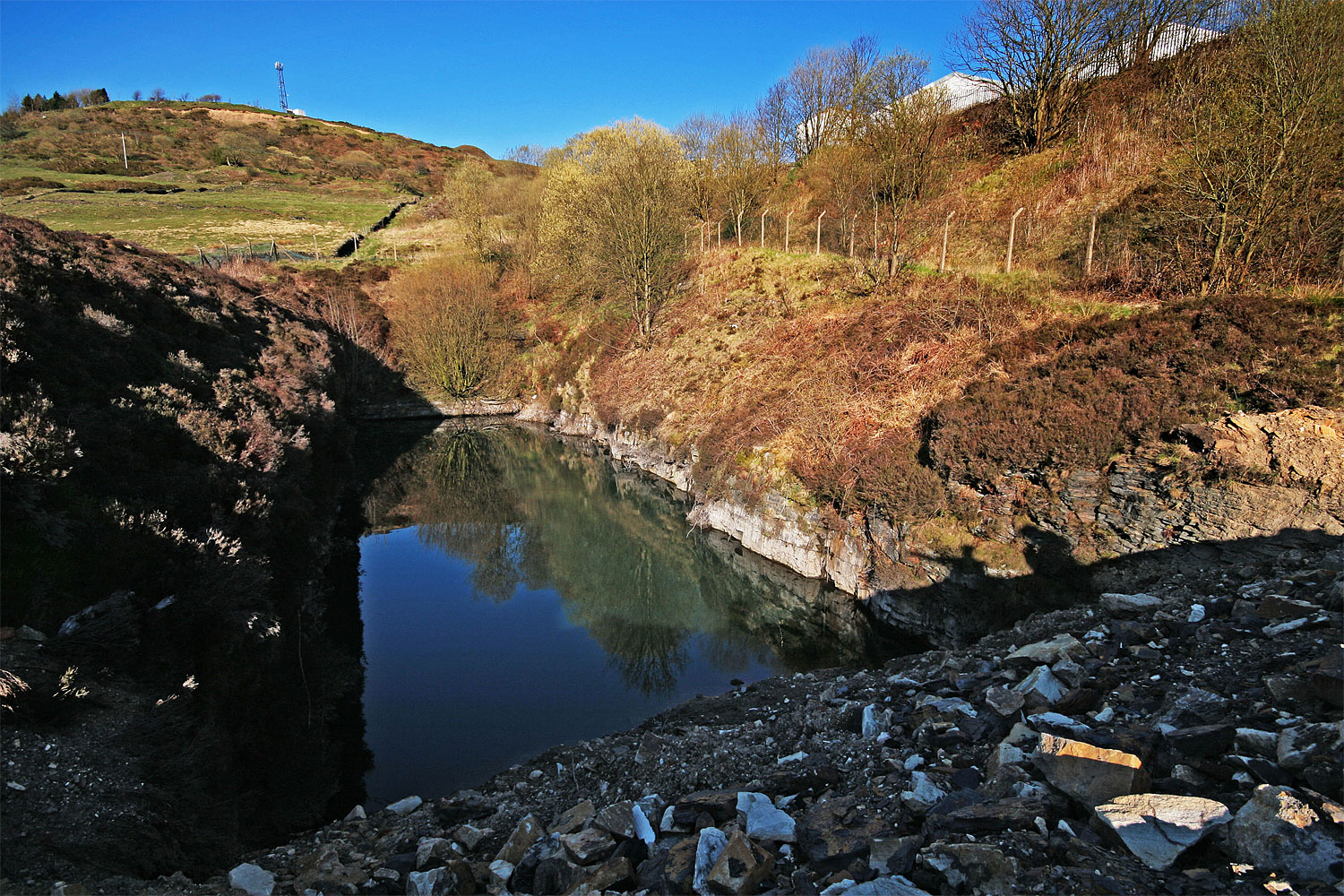
The short remaining section of the tunnel's southern approach cutting during a period of flood.

== After closure ==
In July 1969, an early prototype of an invar wire strainmeter was installed in Queensbury Tunnel as part of research by a team of scientists from the University of Cambridge into Earth strain. Following the project's conclusion, the facility was retained and expanded. Recording equipment was housed in a hut close to No.4 shaft. The facility was closed in November 1979.

In 1991, scientists from British Rail's Research Centre carried out experiments into the effectiveness of new waterproof grout which was injected through the lining at locations close to the northernmost shaft.

Queensbury Tunnel is built on a gradient of 1 in 100 (1%), falling to the south. Due to the amount of water entering the tunnel and the infilling of its southern approach cutting, severe flooding has affected it since the 1980s. During periods of heavy rain, the floodwater has reached a depth of approximately 11.5 m (38 ft) at the south portal, extending into the tunnel by half its length.

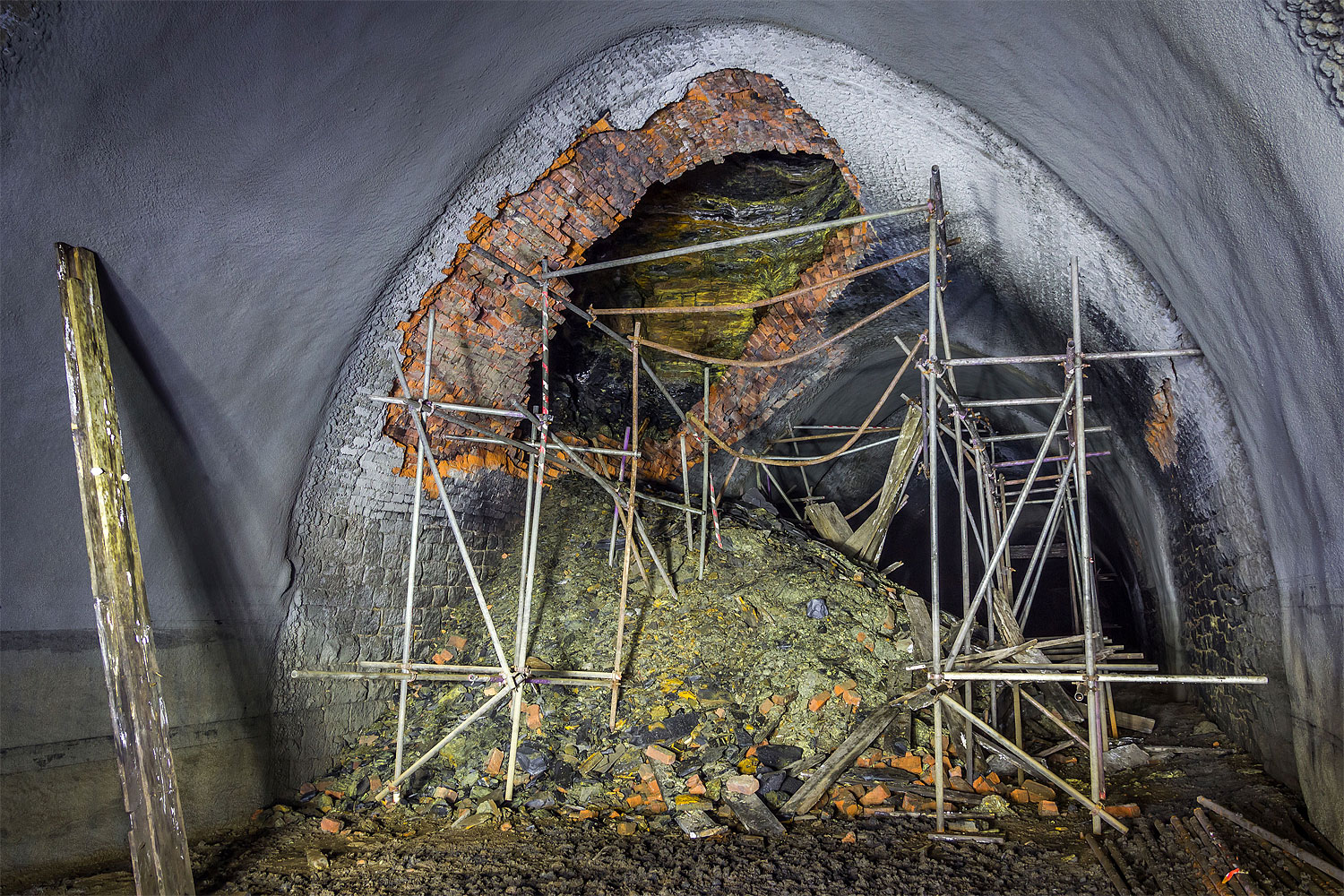
One of two partial collapses to the south of No.4 shaft

Withdrawal of its maintenance regime after closure prompted a considerable deterioration in the tunnel's condition. In 2013–2014, two partial collapses occurred to the south of its midpoint. A number of severe bulges have also been recorded, as well as deep, longitudinal spalling to the south of No.4 shaft. Without intervention, engineers assert that this section is likely to suffer further collapses in years to come.

The Institution of Civil Engineers listed Queensbury Tunnel as a Historical Engineering Work in June 2016 and it was listed on The Victorian Society's Top 10 Most Endangered Buildings in September 2019.

== Abandonment ==
Plans for the formal abandonment of Queensbury Tunnel were included in a report developed by Jacobs, an engineering consultancy, for BRB (Residuary) Ltd in October 2009. It recommended that the tunnel should be infilled from both entrances for a distance of 150 m (490 ft), substructure plugs placed beneath the five completed ventilation shafts, and all seven shafts backfilled and capped. Jacobs estimated the cost of this work would be £5.125 million. A programme of remedial works to permit safe entry was costed at £1.975 million.

Jacobs submitted a second study – the Queensbury Tunnel Options Report – to Highways England's Historical Railways Estate team in February 2016. This was not progressed beyond the draft stage; however, HRE decided to move forward with two of the abandonment options outlined in it. The first required the tunnel to be infilled from both entrances for a distance of 120 m (390 ft); the second involved backfilling the seven shafts.

In July 2018, the Queensbury Tunnel Society – which is campaigning for the tunnel to be reopened as part of a cycle path – published a report claiming the structure was "generally stable". In an accompanying media statement, it said "the condition of Queensbury Tunnel presents no short-term threat to the people of Queensbury – contrary to the claims last week from Highways England – so those trying hard to secure a positive outcome should be allowed the time they need to undertake a full and thorough assessment of the cycle network proposal."

A contract for the tunnel's abandonment was awarded to AMCO-Giffen in August 2018 at a cost of £3.57 million, comprising £550,000 for preparatory works – which involved strengthening the lining below the shafts – and £3.02 million for the main phase.

In October 2018, Bradford Council informed Highways England that its planning application for the abandonment works would have to be accompanied by an Environmental Impact Assessment, as a result of concerns that the scheme was likely to have significant effects on the environment.

The preparatory works got underway at the same time but their scope had to be broadened in November 2018 due to the tunnel's southern entrance being inaccessible because of flooding. The £50 annual rent had not been paid on a pumping station, resulting in it being shut down. Highways England denied that it was responsible for paying the £50, but campaigners pointed out that Clause 5.4 of its Protocol Agreement with the Department for Transport included "meeting from existing funding all costs associated with the property" and that Schedule 6 Clause 6 of an associated lease required the rent to the paid "whether formally demanded or not".

The additional works included the establishment of a temporary pumping system and strengthening to a 300 m (980 ft) long section of tunnel which had previously been designated as an exclusion zone. By the end of September, around 80% of the floodwater – estimated at 3,700,000 L; 980,000 US gal (820,000 imp gal) – had been removed; however, over the following week, the southern half of the tunnel was again inundated due to a prolonged period of heavy rain. In response, AMCO-Giffen demobilised most of their equipment from the tunnel and the preparatory works were suspended.

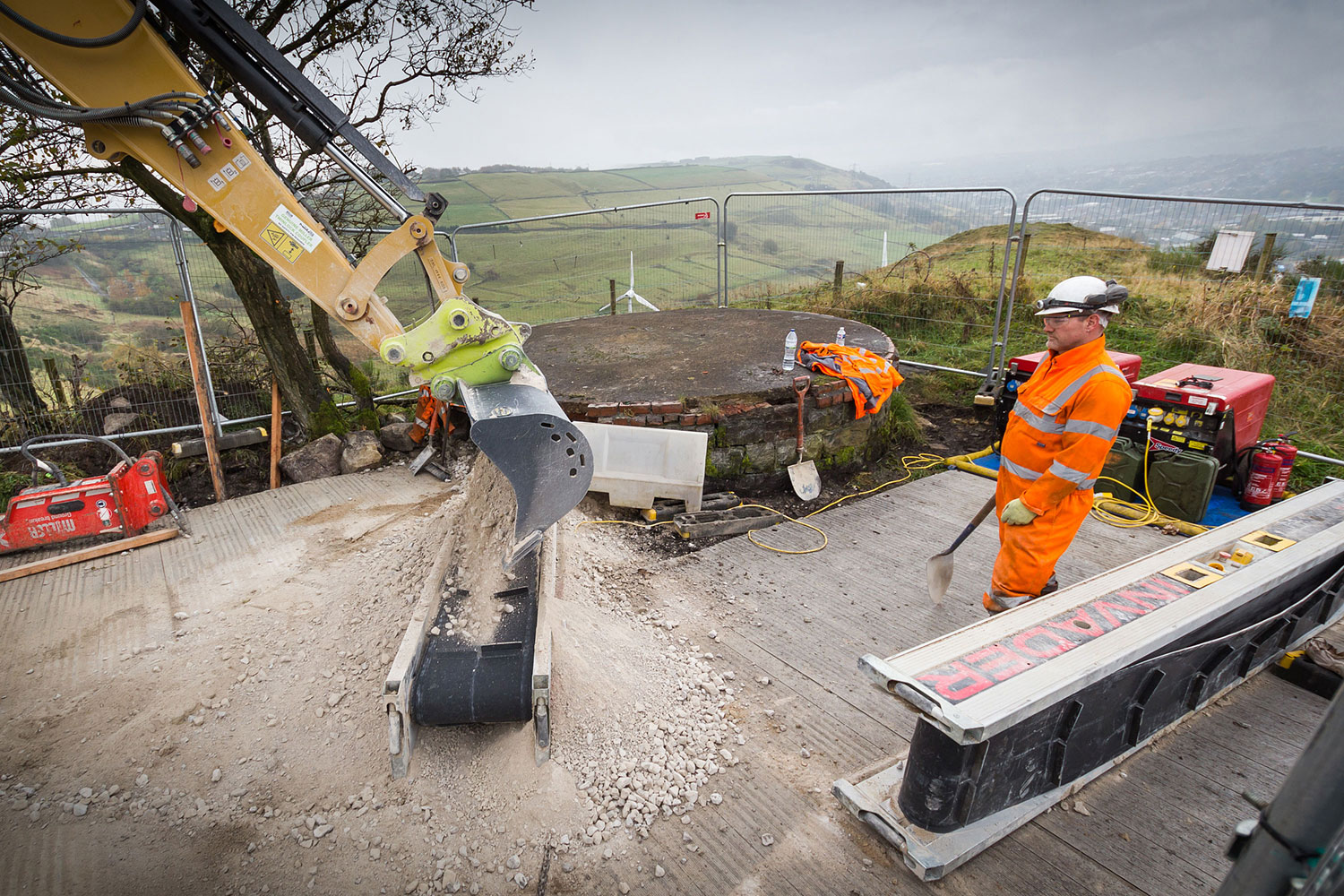
The infilling of No.2 Shaft

In October 2019, No.2 shaft, 365 m (1,198 ft) from the south end of the tunnel, was infilled under emergency powers after concerns were raised about a failing refuge close to the base of the shaft. A spokesman for Highways England said they had "no option other than to complete this work immediately to ensure both the safety of those communities living close by and the workforce who need to maintain it." However, the action was condemned by campaigners who claimed that "Both the shaft and the supporting tunnel lining are in generally fair condition. Even if the defective area did fail, there's no plausible mechanism whereby any effect could be felt at ground level. Load paths from the shaft would redistribute through unaffected parts of the tunnel lining and, more importantly, the shaft lining itself was built in two separate sections, with the upper portion independently supported on a rock ledge 39 metres below ground level."

The leader of Bradford Council wrote to the Secretary of State for Transport to request an immediate halt to the infilling, but the work was completed on 28 October at a cost of £119,000. On 3 December, Bradford Council, as the local planning authority, wrote to Jacobs, Highways England's agent, to assert that "the LPA do not accept that the recent works to Shaft 2 do not require planning permission" and that "the Council's Legal Team will be writing to you separately on this matter."

The overall cost of the preparatory works had risen to £3.44 million by the end of November 2019.

Highways England submitted a full planning application for the abandonment of Queensbury Tunnel in May 2019. The Queensbury Tunnel Society sought public objections against the plans on both technical and planning policy grounds. By 3 March 2020, more than 6,335 objections had been received.

On the same day, Grant Shapps MP, the Secretary of State for Transport, told the Telegraph & Argus newspaper that "Queensbury Tunnel, I've taken a specific personal interest in it. The plan and official advice was to fill it in but I have specifically prevented that from happening to work with local leaders and the Combined Authority to come up with a better solution." He raised the possibility of the tunnel being used either for a cycle route or as part of a local tram/light rail network.

== Cycle path proposal ==
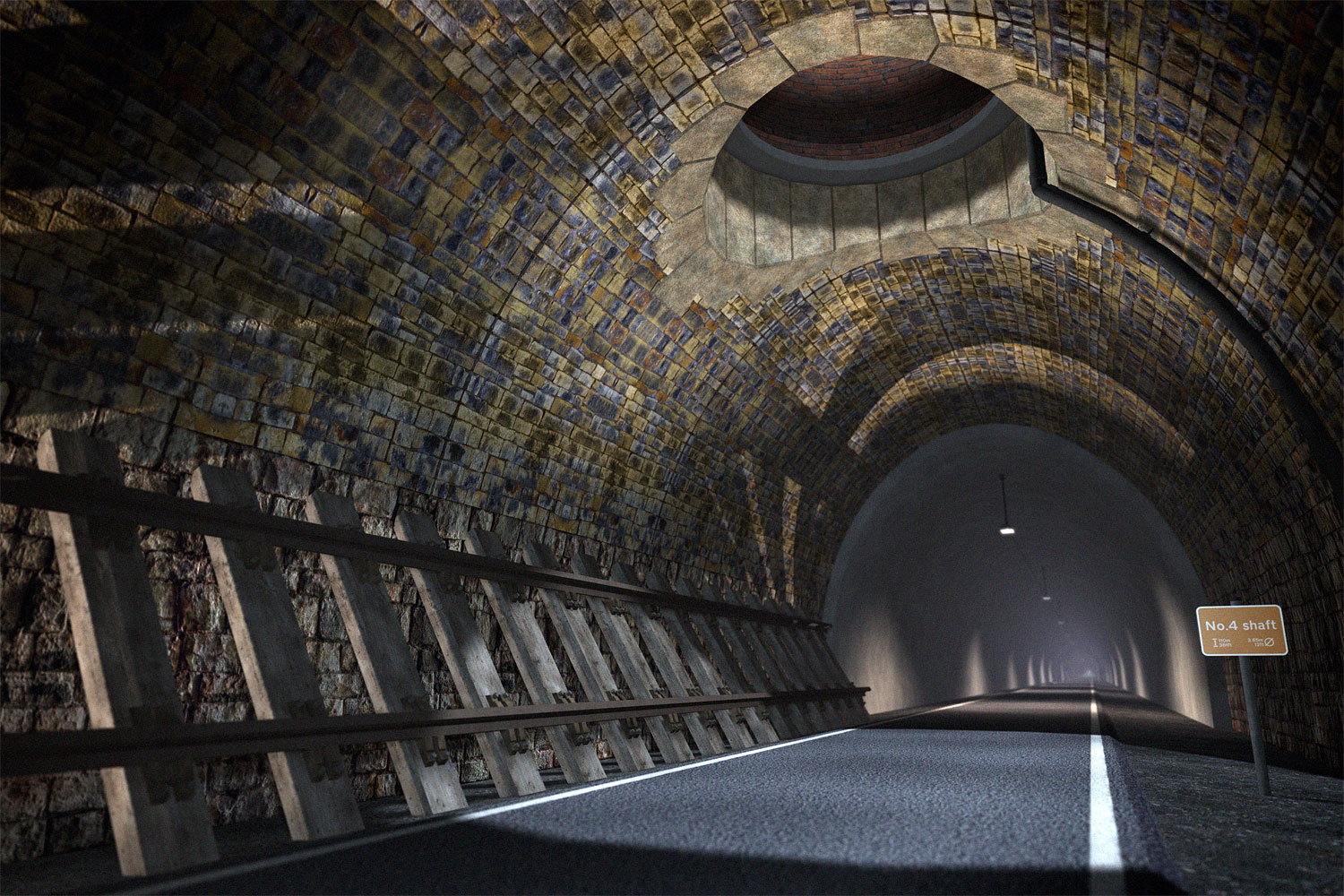
A computer-generated image showing the tunnel after the repair scheme proposed by the Queensbury Tunnel Society

In 2014, a local heritage group proposed that Queensbury Tunnel should be repaired and reopened as part of the Great Northern Railway Trail, as one element of a vision to revitalise the fortunes of Queensbury village. Robert Goodwill MP, who at the time was Parliamentary Under-Secretary of State for Transport, visited the tunnel on 23 June 2014 to hear from the group. He subsequently asked HRE to develop a costing for the tunnel's repair and this was undertaken by Jacobs as part of its Options Report. The work took the form of a high-level desk study and resulted in an estimated cost of £35.4 million being put before the Minister in March 2016. He ruled this out as too expensive, resulting in HRE making progress with its abandonment plans.

The heritage group sought the help of a tunnel engineer and civil engineering contractor to develop its own repair scheme in summer 2016. Costed at £2.8 million, this was published in October 2016 under the banner of the Queensbury Tunnel Society.

A study by Sustrans, published in August 2017, indicated that a network of paths linking Bradford and Keighley to Halifax via the tunnel would drive a 50% increase in the Annual Usage Estimate for commuting and leisure trips on foot or bike through these corridors, from 425,256 to 638,429. It found that £26.8 million of environmental, health and transport benefits could be generated over 30 years, together with £10.8 million in tourism benefits, much of which would be directly attributable to the tunnel's inclusion. Uncertainty over the likely construction cost resulted in the associated Benefit to Cost Ratio having a wide range from 1.4:1 (Low value-for-money) to 3.2:1 (High value for money).

In September 2017, it was announced that HRE had agreed to fund independent investigations by Bradford Council into the condition of the tunnel, repair options and associated costs. This work was completed in October 2018 and the consultants, AECOM, proposed a programme of remediation costing £6.9 million. However this was not without risk as sections of the tunnel could not be surveyed due to HRE exclusion zones and other on-site factors.

At a meeting on 5 February 2019, Bradford Council's Executive Committee voted to endorse the reopening of Queensbury Tunnel as part of a new cycle route connecting Bradford with Halifax. However its backing was subject to funds being secured for construction of the whole scheme, estimated at £16.3 million (plus an additional £7 million for 30 years of maintenance). In a media statement, the Council said "The authority will continue to lobby HRE and the Department of Transport to delay closing the tunnel while it searches for the required funding. However, the AECOM study shows that the tunnel is in an active state of collapse so time is limited."

The Council published an 'Advocacy Document' to support funding applications on 28 June 2019, naming the proposed cycle path as the Bradford-Halifax Greenway or CityConnect 3, the latter reflecting its perceived strategic value in extending the existing CityConnect 1 (Seacroft/Leeds-Bradford) and CityConnect 2 (Shipley-Bradford) routes into Calderdale. By including Queensbury Tunnel, the document states that the route would deliver "a high value Benefit to Cost Ratio of 2.31:1 when taking into account the significant tourism benefits of a greenway connecting two major urban centres to the heart of some of Yorkshire's finest countryside."

In November 2019, the West Yorkshire Combined Authority submitted a bid to the Government's Transforming Cities Fund which included a request for £23 million to turn Queensbury Tunnel into a "high quality cycling route" linking Calderdale and Bradford, describing the project as a "significant opportunity".

In June 2020, Transport Secretary Grant Shapps offered Bradford Council £4 million towards the tunnel's repair in return for taking on its ownership. They were told this was a "best and final" offer and they had four days to accept it. Council leader Susan Hinchcliffe described the sum as "derisory" and "nowhere near enough to save the tunnel". The council subsequently published a new benefit-cost ratio for the proposed Bradford-Halifax Greenway via Queensbury Tunnel, concluding that it would return £5.60 in social and economic benefits for every £1 invested, representing very high value for money. QTS wrote to Shapps and urged him to "stand by your previous statements and allocate a sufficient sum from your £2 billion active travel fund to give Bradford Council the confidence to take on the tunnel's ownership and construct a cycle route through it."
