= Listed buildings in Queensbury, West Yorkshire =

Queensbury is a village and a ward of the City of Bradford, West Yorkshire, England. The ward contains 64 listed buildings that are recorded in the National Heritage List for England. Of these, one is listed at Grade II*, the middle of the three grades, and the others are at Grade II, the lowest grade. In addition to the village of Queensbury, the ward contains the areas of Old Dolphin, Clayton Heights, and Catherine Slack and the surrounding countryside. In the ward are former textile mills, the largest being Black Dyke Mills, and some of the surviving buildings associated with these mills have been listed. Most of the other listed buildings are houses and cottages and associated structures, farmhouses and farm buildings. Otherwise, the listed buildings include churches, public houses, a pair of water troughs, milestones, a memorial to Prince Albert, a civic hall, and a war memorial.

== Key ==
Grade	Criteria
II*	Particularly important buildings of more than special interest
II	Buildings of national importance and special interest

== Buildings ==
Name and location	Photograph	Date	Notes	Grade
47, 49 and 51 Shibden Head Lane; 53.75870°N 1.85696°W	—	17th century	A house later altered and divided, it is in stone with quoins, and a stone slate roof with chamfered gable copings and kneelers on the cross-wing. There are two storeys, a main range and a gabled cross-wing. The main doorway has a quoined chamfered surround and to the right is an inserted doorway. The windows are mullioned, and some mullions have been removed. In the apex of the gable is a former dovecote.	II
Folly Hall Farmhouse; 53.75928°N 1.86123°W	—	17th century	The farmhouse, which was much altered in the 19th century, is in stone with quoins, and a stone slate roof with a coped gable and kneelers on the right. There are two storeys and a rear outshut. Most of the mullions and all the transoms have been removed. The doorway on the front has a chamfered surround, a Tudor arched head, and a hood mould, and at the rear is a doorway with a chamfered surround and a cambered head.	II
Long Shaw Farmhouse; 53.75755°N 1.83968°W	—	17th century (possible)	The farmhouse, which has been altered, is in stone, and has a stone slate roof with a coped gable and kneelers on the left. There are two storeys, and on the front is an open two-storey gabled porch with a moulded surround and a cambered head. Inside the porch are stone seats, above the entrance is a mullioned window, and in the right return is an oculus. Elsewhere, the windows are mullioned, and some contain casements.	II
Shugden Farmhouse; 53.77267°N 1.86825°W	—	17th century	The farmhouse, which was altered in the 19th century, is in stone with quoins and a stone slate roof with moulded kneelers. There are two storeys and a continuous rear outshut. The main doorway has a chamfered surround, some of the windows have single lights, and the others are mullioned with three lights and casements.	II
Moor Royd Gate Farmhouse and barn 53.78025°N 1.86135°W	—	Late 17th century	The farmhouse and barn are in gritstone, the farmhouse is rendered, the barn has quoins, and they share a stone slate roof. The farmhouse contains a doorway with a four-centred arch and a square head, the windows are mullioned, with some mullions removed, and those in the ground floor have hood moulds.	II
Shugden Head Farmhouse; 53.77483°N 1.86863°W	—	1682	The farmhouse, which has been restored and partly rebuilt, is in stone with quoins, and a stone slate roof with coped gables and moulded kneelers. There are two storeys, and on the front is a porch that has a dated and initialled Tudor arched lintel with decorative spandrels. Inside the porch are seats, and the outer and inner doorways have chamfered surrounds. The windows are mullioned, with a continuous hood mould over the ground floor windows.	II
West Scholes House and Cottage; 53.77907°N 1.85124°W		1694	The house is in gritstone with quoins, and a stone slate roof with saddlestones, and kneelers at the rear. There are two storeys and five bays, the left bay projecting, and a rear single-storey wing at right angles. The gabled porch contains a dovecote and a dated and initialled panel. The windows are mullioned, those in the ground floor with hood moulds.	II*
Myrtle Grove Farmhouse and barn 53.77295°N 1.83066°W	—	Late 17th or early 18th century	The farmhouse and integral barn, which were refaced in the 18th century, are in rendered sandstone and have a stone slate roof. In the farmhouse are mullioned windows, and the barn has quoins.	II
Hazel Hurst House; 53.76061°N 1.85435°W	—	1724	The house is part of a former hall, and is in stone, partly rendered, with quoins, a band, and a stone slate roof. There are two storeys, and on the front is an open two-storey porch with a coped gable and initialled and dated kneelers. Inside the porch are stone seats, and the inner doorway has a moulded surround and a cambered head. The windows contain replacement casements.	II
Old Dolphin Public House; 53.77085°N 1.82706°W		Mid 18th century	The public house, which was enlarged in about 1790, is in sandstone with quoins, bracketed eaves, and a slate roof. There are two storeys, a modern porch, and the windows are mullioned.	II
Pollit Farmhouse and barn 53.77026°N 1.81782°W	—	Mid to late 18th century	The farmhouse and barn are in gritstone with stone slate roofs. The house has two storeys, and a roof with a saddlestone and kneelers. There are three bays, in the centre is a gabled porch with an oval window above, and the other windows are casements. The barn has quoins and later openings.	II
31 and 33 Highgate Road; 53.77236°N 1.81313°W	—	Late 18th century	A pair of sandstone cottages, the upper floor rendered, that have a stone slate roof with prominent kneelers. There are two storeys, and each cottage has two bays. The doorways have squared jambs, and the windows have single lights or are mullioned. In the ground floor are two blocked small round-headed lights, the arches each cut out of a solid lintel.	II
Hare and Hounds Public House; 53.77282°N 1.80992°W		Late 18th century (probable)	A house, later a public house, in sandstone with bracketed gutter eaves and a stone slate roof. There are two storeys, the doorways have squared jambs, and the windows are mullioned with two or three lights.	II
Jockey Hall Farmhouse and barn 53.77181°N 1.82848°W	—	Late 18th century	The farmhouse and integral barn are in sandstone with quoins, and a stone slate roof with saddlestones and shaped kneelers. The house has two storeys and two bays, the doorway has a plain surround, and the windows are mullioned. In the barn is a semicircular-arched cart entry.	II
58 and 60 Halifax Road; 53.75432°N 1.86405°W		1779	A pair of mirror-image stone houses, at one time a courthouse, with quoins, sill bands, moulded gutter brackets, and a two-span stone slate roof with coped gables. There are two storeys and a symmetrical front of two bays. In the outer parts are round-headed doorways, and each house has a Venetian window in each floor, all with imposts and keystones. Between the upper floor windows is an initialled and dated plaque.	II
194 Highgate Road; 53.77079°N 1.82727°W	—	c. 1790	A sandstone house with a stone slate roof, two storeys and an attic. The front facing the road has a pedimented gable containing a lunette. The doorway has squared jambs, and the windows are mullioned on sill bands, with two or three lights.	II
Coach House and Stables, The Old Dolphin Public House; 53.77089°N 1.82688°W	—	c. 1790	The coach house and stables, later used for other purposes, are in sandstone with bracketed eaves, and a stone slate roof. There are two storeys and a symmetrical front of five bays, the middle bay projecting slightly under a pediment containing a lunette. This bay contains a semicircular-arched carriage entrance with voussoirs and impost bands. Elsewhere, there are mullioned windows, hatches, a doorway, and a loading door.	II
20 and 22 New House Lane; 53.77051°N 1.82472°W	—	c. 1800	A pair of sandstone cottages with sill bands, and a stone slate roof with prominent kneelers. There are two storeys and each cottage has two bays. The doorways in the right bays have squared jambs, above each doorway is a single-light window, and in the left bay is a three-light mullioned window in each floor.	II
New Royd Gate Farmhouse and barn 53.78178°N 1.86173°W	—	c. 1800	The farmhouse and integral barn are in sandstone, and have a stone slate roof with saddlestones and kneelers. There are two storeys and a rear outshut. The farmhouse has a doorway with squared jambs and three-light mullioned windows, and in the barn is a segmental archway.	II
Fiddler's Hill Farmhouse and barn 53.77320°N 1.83327°W	—	Late 18th or early 19th century	The farmhouse and integral barn are in sandstone with a stone slate roof. The doorways have squared jambs, and the windows are mullioned with two lights.	II
Stone troughs opposite West Scholes House; 53.77898°N 1.85076°W	—	18th or early 19th century	The two water troughs are in stone, set one above the other, forming an overflow system. They are set against a dry stone wall.	II
3, 5 and 7 Highgate Road; 53.77236°N 1.81178°W	—	c. 1800–20	A row of three sandstone cottages with a stone slate roof and one storey. The doorways have squared jambs, and the windows are mullioned with two lights and some mullions removed.	II
1–11 Stogden Hill; 53.77021°N 1.82593°W	—	c. 1800–20	A row of sandstone cottages with stone slate roofs, and one storey. The doorways have squared jambs, and the windows are mullioned with two lights.	II
51 and 53 West Scholes Lane; 53.77920°N 1.85079°W	—	c. 1800–20	A house divided into two cottages, it is in sandstone with quoins, and a stone slate roof with saddlestones and prominent kneelers. There are two storeys, three bays, and recessed one-bay wings. In the centre is a gabled joint porch, and the windows are mullioned with some mullions removed.	II
Marley House; 53.77890°N 1.84938°W	—	c. 1800–20	A sandstone house that has a stone slate roof with saddlestones. There are two storeys and three bays. The doorway has pilasters, the windows on the front are sashes, at the rear they are mullioned with two lights, and in the gable ends are Venetian windows.	II
1–19 Ackroyd Square; 53.77071°N 1.82524°W	—	c. 1800–30	A row of sandstone cottages with stone slate roofs and two storeys. The doorways have squared jambs, and the windows are mullioned with two lights; some have been altered.	II
63–77 Highgate Road and 1A Ackroyd Square; 53.77088°N 1.82538°W	—	c. 1800–30	Two rows of sandstone cottages with sill bands, stone slate roofs, and two storeys. The doorways have plain surrounds, and the windows either have single lights, or are mullioned with two lights, and some mullions removed.	II
83, 85 and 87 Highgate Road; 53.77074°N 1.82601°W	—	c. 1800–30	A row of three sandstone cottages with sill bands, a stone slate roof, and two storeys. Each house has a doorway to the left with squared jambs, a single-light window above, and to the right is a two-light mullioned window in each floor.	II
2 and 4 New House Lane; 53.77096°N 1.82477°W		c. 1800–30	A pair of mirror-image sandstone cottages with paired eaves brackets and a stone slate roof with prominent kneelers. There are two storeys and each cottage has two bays. The doorways in the outer bays have squared jambs, and the windows are casements.	II
6, 8 and 10 New House Lane; 53.77082°N 1.82476°W	—	c. 1800–30	A row of three sandstone cottages with paired eaves brackets and a stone slate roof. There are two storeys and basements, and each cottage has two bays. Steps lead up to a doorway in the right bay, above it is a single-light window, and in the left bays are two-light mullioned windows.	II
Wharton Square; 53.77237°N 1.81175°W	—	c. 1800–30	A pair of sandstone cottages with a stone slate roof and two storeys. The doorways have squared jambs, and the windows are mullioned with two lights.	II
12–18 New House Lane; 53.77066°N 1.82477°W	—	1809	A row of four sandstone cottages with close-set eaves brackets and a stone slate roof. Thee are two storeys, and each cottage has one bay. The doorways have squared jambs, most of the windows are mullioned with two lights, and there is one single-light window.	II
Barn southwest of Law Hill Farmhouse; 53.77806°N 1.86260°W	—	1818	The barn is in sandstone and has a stone slate roof with saddlestones. It contains a segmental-arched cart entry with voussoirs and a dated keystone.	II
Baptist Church; 53.76927°N 1.84740°W		1820	The church is in stone with a band, a dentilled eaves cornice, and a hipped slate roof. There are two storeys, a symmetrical front of five bays, and three bays on the sides. In the centre is a Venetian window, above which is a tablet with an inscribed and dated roundel, and a tripartite window. It is flanked by doorways with plain surrounds, and the other windows are sashes.	II
27 Chapel Street; 53.76932°N 1.84718°W	—	1820	Originally a minister's house, it is in stone with dentil brackets, and a stone slate roof with coped gables and kneelers. There are two storeys and a symmetrical front of three bays. The central doorway has panelled jambs, a panelled lintel, a decorated frieze and a moulded canopy on console brackets. Above the doorway is a single-light window, and the other windows have two lights.	II
27–43 Low Lane Side; 53.77781°N 1.85248°W	—	c. 1820–30	A row of sandstone cottages with paired block brackets to the eaves and a stone slate roof. There are two storeys, The doorways have squared jambs with single lights above, the other windows are mullioned with three lights, and some mullions have been removed.	II
24–38 New House Lane; 53.77031°N 1.82467°W	—	c. 1820–30	Two rows of sandstone cottages with stone slate roofs. They have one storey, and No. 38 is set at right angles to the others. The doorways have squared jambs, the windows are mullioned with two lights, and some mullions have been removed.	II
9–15 Highgate Road; 53.77232°N 1.81215°W	—	c. 1820–40	A row of sandstone cottages with a stone slate roof and two storeys. The doorways have squared jambs, the windows in the upper floor are casements, and in the lower floor are two-light mullioned windows with some mullions removed.	II
Former Nag's Head Public House; 53.77235°N 1.81888°W		Early 19th century	The former public house, which was later extended, is in sandstone with a slate roof. There are two storeys and four bays, the right bay being a two-storey canted bay window with a hipped roof. The doorways have squared jambs, most of the windows are mullioned with two lights, and some openings have been blocked.	II
154 Highgate Road and workshop 53.77135°N 1.82413°W	—	c. 1830	Originally a pair of two-storey cottages with a single-story outhouse to the left. The building is in sandstone with a stone slate roof. The doorways have squared jambs, one is blocked, above them are single-light windows, and the other windows are mullioned with two lights.	II
156, 158 and 160 Highgate Road; 53.77126°N 1.82450°W	—	c. 1830	A row of three sandstone cottages with a stone slate roof and two storeys. The doorways have squared jambs, the windows are mullioned with two lights, and some have been altered.	II
Brow Top; 53.77410°N 1.82983°W	—	c. 1830	A row of four sandstone cottages with a sill band, dentilled eaves brackets, and a stone slate roof. The doorways have plain surrounds, and the windows are mullioned.	II
Main block and portal, Highgate Mills; 53.77278°N 1.81746°W		Early to mid 19th century	The mill block is in sandstone, with three storeys and 16 bays. At the east end are two round-arched windows with voussoirs, between them are dated piers, and in the northeast corner is a square tapering chimney. At the entrance to the yard is a portal containing a semicircular arch rising from imposts, with a rusticated surround, a keystone with bearded heads, a blocking course, and a crested panel with the date 1865.	II
Milestone opposite 70 Halifax Road; 53.76306°N 1.85871°W		Early to mid 19th century (probable)	The milestone is on the east side of Halifax Road (A647 road). It consists of a stone with a moulded top, inscribed with the distances to Bradford and Halifax.	II
Milestone opposite New Park Road; 53.77191°N 1.85372°W		Early to mid 19th century	The milestone is on the northeast side of Brighouse and Denholme Road (A644 road). It consists of a triangular stone with a domed top, inscribed with the distances to Brighouse and Denholme.	II
Milestone, Scarlet Heights; 53.76985°N 1.83810°W		Early to mid 19th century	The milestone is on the north side of Scarlet Heights (A647 road). It consists of a square stone with a domed top, inscribed with the distances to Bradford and Halifax.	II
Black Dyke Mills; 53.76744°N 1.84350°W		1842	The textile mills were extended to the west until 1868, and are in stone with dentilled eaves cornices, and stone slate roofs. The earliest block at the east has five storeys, basements and attics, and 15 bays, with an extension of nine bays, and the west block is taller and wider, with four storeys, basements and attics, and 27 bays. There are two towers with pyramidal roofs, and in the west block is a round-arched carriageway with rusticated quoins and voussoirs.	II
Union Croft Chapel; 53.76131°N 1.85973°W		1842	The chapel, which was extended to the rear in 1925, is in sandstone with a stone slate roof. There are two storeys, a symmetrical gabled front of three bays, and three bays along the sides. The central double doorway has a slab canopy on carved brackets, above it is a sash window, and in the gable is a round-arched light, and an inscribed and dated tablet. The other windows are four-paned casements.	II
Holy Trinity Church; 53.76687°N 1.84922°W		1843–45	The east end of the church was rebuilt in 1884–45, and in 1906–07 the tower was dismantled and rebuilt in its present position. The church is built in stone with stone slate roofs, and is in Early English style. It consists of a nave, north and south aisles, a chancel with a north vestry and a south organ chamber, and a northwest tower. The tower has three stages, angle buttresses rising to octagonal pinnacles, an elaborate gabled north doorway, and clock faces on each side. The east window has three lights, with colonnettes surmounted by carvings of angels, a beast and a bird.	II
12–18 Back Lane; 53.77279°N 1.81799°W	—	c. 1850	A row of sandstone cottages with stone slate roofs, associated with Highgate Mills and closing the west side of the mill yard. The doorways have squared jambs, and the windows are mullioned with two lights.	II
Stable and coach house, 37 Low Lane Side; 53.77798°N 1.85226°W	—	c. 1850–60	The building is in sandstone with bracketed eaves, and a stone slate roof with saddlestones. In the centre is a segmental-arched carriage entrance with grooved voussoirs, above are paired round-headed openings, and in the eaves are triangular vents.	II
Former Mountain Eagle Public House; 53.77504°N 1.86148°W	—	c. 1850–60	The former public house is in sandstone, with rusticated quoins a moulded eaves cornice, and a stone slate roof with coped gables. There are two storeys and a rear wing. The doorway has a cornice on console brackets, and the windows either have a single light, or are mullioned. In the rear wing is a first floor doorway converted into a window.	II
Westwood; 53.77785°N 1.85229°W	—	c. 1850–60	A sandstone house at the end of a row, with rusticated quoins, a moulded eaves cornice, and a stone slate roof. There are two storeys and a symmetrical front of three bays. The central doorway has pilasters and an entablature, and the windows are sashes.	II
Chimney, Black Dyke Mills; 53.76694°N 1.84414°W		1854–68	The chimney is in stone and is tall, octagonal and tapering, on a square base. It has iron tie-rings, and at the top is a broad moulded cornice.	II
Albert Memorial; 53.76845°N 1.84369°W		1863	A memorial to Prince Albert in the form of a drinking fountain in Gothic style. It is in stone on four steps, and contains drinking bowls in red granite. Above these are carvings of birds and an inscribed bronze plaque, and the next stage contains carvings of female allegorical figures in canopied niches, surrounded by colonnettes and buttresses rising to crocketed pinnacles. At the top a pedestal carries a spire surrounded by gablets and surmounted by a cross finial.	II
Two portals, former Bank Top Mill; 53.77255°N 1.80946°W		1864	The portals flank the entrance to the former mill, and are in stone. They have chamfered quoins, archivolt archways, keystones carved with bearded heads, impost mouldings, and entablatures with bracketed cornices. The east portal is surmounted by a large scroll supported by a cartouche with a wreath surround.	II
Warehouse, Sand Beds; 53.76895°N 1.84350°W		Mid to late 19th century	The building is in stone with quoins, a moulded eaves cornice, and a stone slate roof with coped gables and moulded kneelers. There are two storeys and five bays, the wider middle bay projecting slightly under a pedimented gable containing an oculus. In the ground floor is an elliptical-arched entrance with rusticated quoins and voussoirs, above which are triple round-arched widows with impost blocks and keystones. The outer bays contain flat-arched windows in the ground floor and round-arched windows above. On the roof are ventilators.	II
Gate piers, gates, wall and railings, Black Dyke Mills; 53.76829°N 1.84467°W		1868–81	In the centre is a stone archway with square piers, a moulded bracketed cornice and a blocking course. The gateways have paired piers to the left and a single pier to the right, each with a fluted frieze and an ornamental cap. The cast iron gates are ornate, and the wall has piers and similar railings.	II
Lodge, railings and gate, Black Dyke Mills; 53.76823°N 1.84486°W	—	1868–81	The lodge at the entrance to the mill is in stone with bracketed eaves, and a Welsh slate roof with moulded copings. There are two storeys and an L-shaped plan, with a rounded infill in the angle. Facing the entrance is a three-bay round-arched porch with keystones. On the road front is a canted bay window. The doorway in the rounded infill and the ground floor windows have round-arched heads. In the upper floor are paired sash windows with cambered heads and keystones. Enclosing the area to the front are dwarf walls, and cast iron railings and gates.	II
Three storey warehouse, Black Dyke Mills; 53.76821°N 1.84387°W		1868–81	The building is in stone with three storeys, a flat roof, a front of 19 bays, and sides of five bays. The middle three bays on the front project slightly, and have pilasters, a full dentilled entablature, and an openwork parapet with a cornice and large finials. The ground floor windows are blocked, in the middle floor the three central bays have flat-headed windows, in the outer bays they have round heads, and the top floor contains windows with stilted cambered heads on moulded imposts.	II
Commemorative Stone, Perseverance Road; 53.77855°N 1.87253°W		1871	The stone commemorates the opening of the road. It consists of three blocks of stone, a square base with the names of officials, an elliptical middle section with an inscription, and a pyramidal cap with a square base.	II
Victoria Hall; 53.76912°N 1.84247°W		1887–91	The hall, incorporating swimming baths and a library, is in stone with a roof of Westmorland slate. There are two storeys and a basement, a front of three blocks, and a recessed bay on the right. The middle block projects, and contains a portico with paired Ionic columns, an entablature and a balustraded parapet. The entrance is round-headed with a moulded architrave, a fanlight, and spandrels with carved foliage. Above this is a tall square tower with an undulating parapet, surmounted by an octagonal lantern with a dome and a tall finial. The outer blocks each have three bays, the middle bay gabled, and containing a large semicircular-headed mullioned and transomed window. The left block also contains a large bay window, its parapet swept over an elaborate carved shield. In front of the outer blocks is a low arcaded balustrade.	II
Park House; 53.76758°N 1.83708°W	—	1888	A large house in stone with a green slate roof. There are two storeys and an attic, and a front of three bays, the outer bays gabled. In the right bay is a two-storey canted bay window with a parapet, and in the left bay is a two-storey square bay window with a shaped parapet. The middle bay contains a round-arched open porch over which is an arcaded balustrade. The doorway has a moulded surround, a cambered head, and carved spandrels. In all bays are mullioned and transomed windows, and in the middle bay is a gabled dormer. The gables in the outer bays contain carved motifs.	II
War memorial 53.76790°N 1.84796°W		1922	The war memorial is in sandstone and stands in an enclosed area by a road junction. It is on a podium of three octagonal steps, and has a moulded base. The sides are arched, they contain tracery and have foliated spandrels, and are framed by clustered colonnettes with foliated capitals. On the top is a slender spire with a panelled cap and a cross finial. Behind is a curved wall with an inscription and panels with the names of those lost in the two World Wars. The area is enclosed by iron gates and railings.	II
