= Historical Railways Estate =

Structures associated with former British railways

The Historical Railways Estate (HRE) is formed of over 3,100 structures—predominantly bridges, viaducts, tunnels and other works—associated with former railways in the United Kingdom. The structures are owned by the Department for Transport (DfT) and managed by National Highways (NH).

NH has completed repair and restoration works at hundreds of structures, but has also been criticised for infilling and demolishing bridges that had the potential for future reuse.

== Background ==
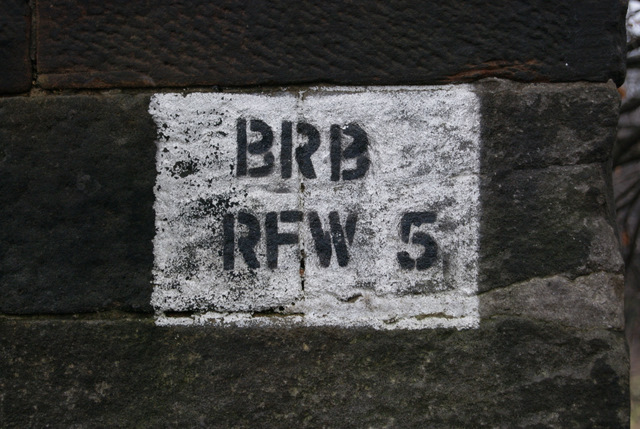
Bridge number on former railway bridge in Renfrewshire

The railways came into public ownership as a result of the Transport Act 1947. When they were privatised in 1997, operational infrastructure became the responsibility of Railtrack and then Network Rail. The Historical Railways Estate (formerly known as the Closed-line Estate and the Burdensome Estate) is the land and infrastructure associated with closed lines. This transferred to BRB (Residuary) Limited, which was dissolved in 2013, and the HRE was transferred to the Highways Agency, which later became Highways England (HE) and then National Highways (NH).

NH states that the HRE comprises 2,055 bridges, 152 tunnels, 93 viaducts and aqueducts, 643 partially dismantled structures, 181 earthworks, and 106 other sites. The miscellaneous sites include plots of land, former roads, and monuments or memorials built by railway companies. The vast majority of the structures, 2,243, are in England; 608 are in Scotland, and 379 are in Wales; 77 of the structures are listed buildings.

Many structures that were once part of the HRE have been transferred to other organisations to be repurposed, often as part of cycling and walking routes. One such structure is Bennerley Viaduct, now owned by Railway Paths Ltd.

== Repurposing ==
NH is funded only to maintain the structures in a safe condition, but has assisted other organisations on repurposing proposals.

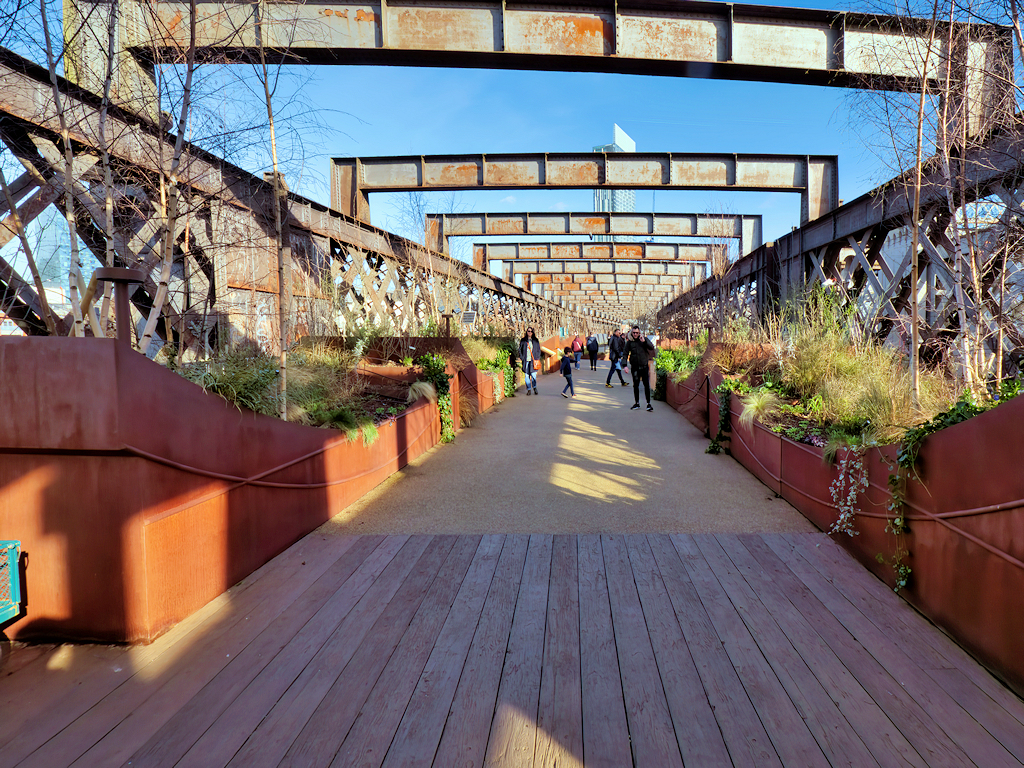
Castlefield Viaduct, a listed HRE viaduct, has been partially repurposed to form an urban park in the middle of Manchester.

One example is Castlefield Viaduct in Manchester, which the National Trust has converted into an elevated park, inspired by the High Line in New York City. NH is also cooperating with the Rhondda Tunnel Society which is hoping to reopen a tunnel of almost two miles in length, connecting the Rhondda and Afan valleys in south Wales.

National Highways is working with active travel groups in the south-west to extend the Strawberry Line railway path, with the route forming part of the Somerset Circle which is intended to pass under or over a number of HRE structures.

== Restoration ==
NH has undertaken many large restoration schemes at viaducts protected by listings in England and Scotland, as well as repair works at hundreds of smaller structures.

The listed viaducts include Westfield Viaduct in West Lothian where a £2 million scheme won the Translink Structures Award at the National Railway Heritage in Awards 2023 and Pensford Viaduct in Somerset which was subject to the repointing of its parapets at a cost of £300,000. Riddings Viaduct across the Anglo-Scottish border has undergone a programme of general repairs.

== Queensbury Tunnel ==
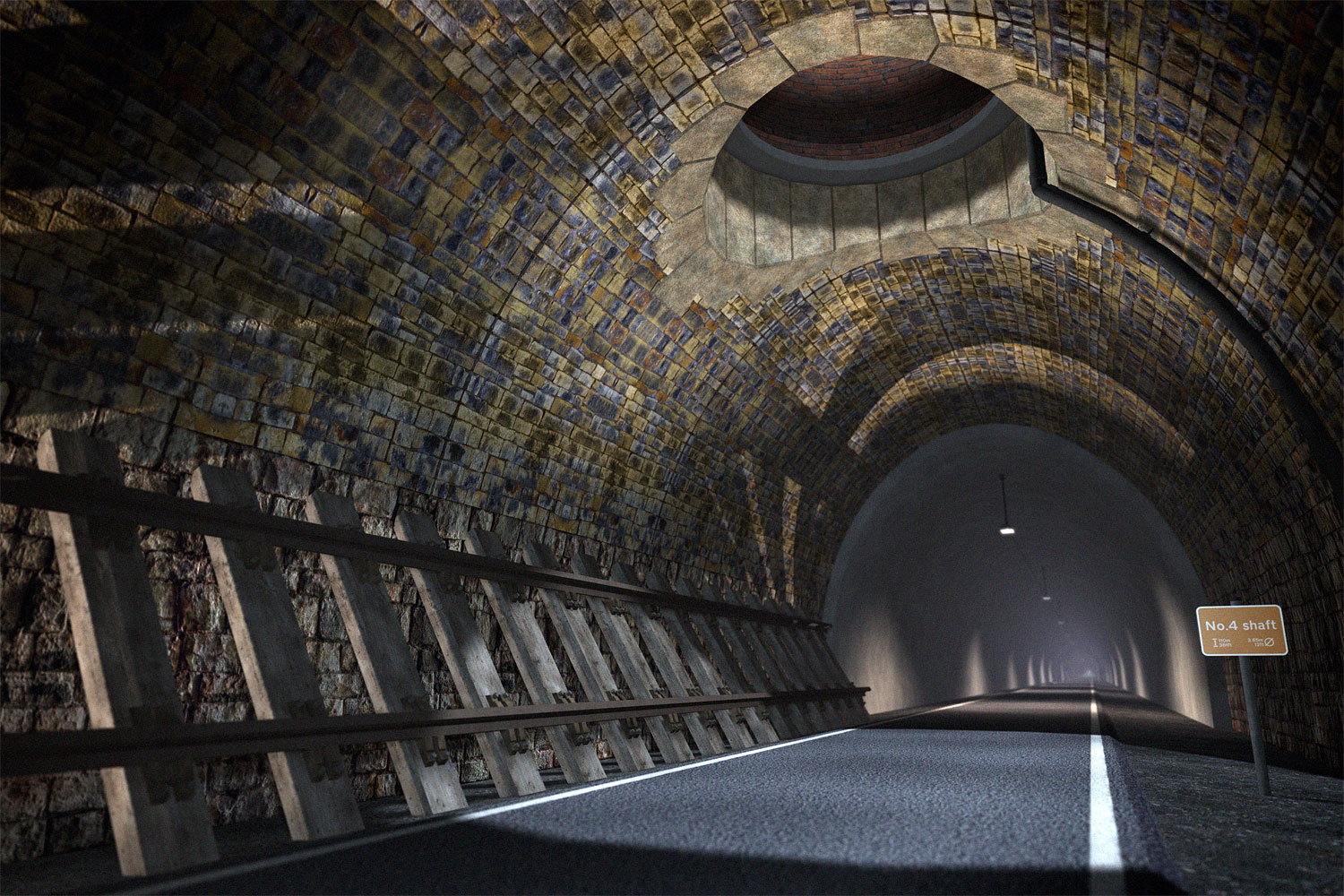
A computer-generated image of how Queensbury Tunnel would look after conversion to accommodate an active travel route.

In 2019, Highways England submitted plans to Bradford Council for a £3.5 million scheme to infill both ends of Queensbury Tunnel in West Yorkshire and seven shafts that were sunk for construction purposes in the 1870s. The work is opposed by a campaign group which wants the structure to be reopened as part of an active travel network connecting Bradford, Keighley and Halifax. A feasibility study by Sustrans suggests that this would offer £3 in social and economic benefits for every £1 spent on repairing the tunnel and the paths' construction.

Preparatory works for the abandonment scheme started in 2018, but Grant Shapps, then the Transport Secretary, supported the repurposing proposal and works were instead undertaken to strengthen parts of the tunnel, securing it for future reuse. The total cost was £7.2 million.

In 2025, the Labour government announced that it had authorised NH to continue with the tunnel's abandonment at an estimated cost of £7.5 million, but campaigners argued that this was an “investment in destruction”.

== Demolitions and infillings ==
Between 2013 and 2021, the Highways Agency/Highways England infilled 51 structures at a cost of £8.01 million and, in January 2021, it was revealed that the company had plans to demolish or infill a further 134 bridges and tunnels. This provoked opposition on the grounds that many of the structures had some potential to be repurposed for railway reopening schemes or active travel routes. No evaluation was made of their heritage or environmental value. Campaigners claimed that the proposed action was disproportionate as most of the condemned structures presented no significant risks and, in some cases, the works were carried out under permitted development rights which only applied to temporary works in emergency situations.

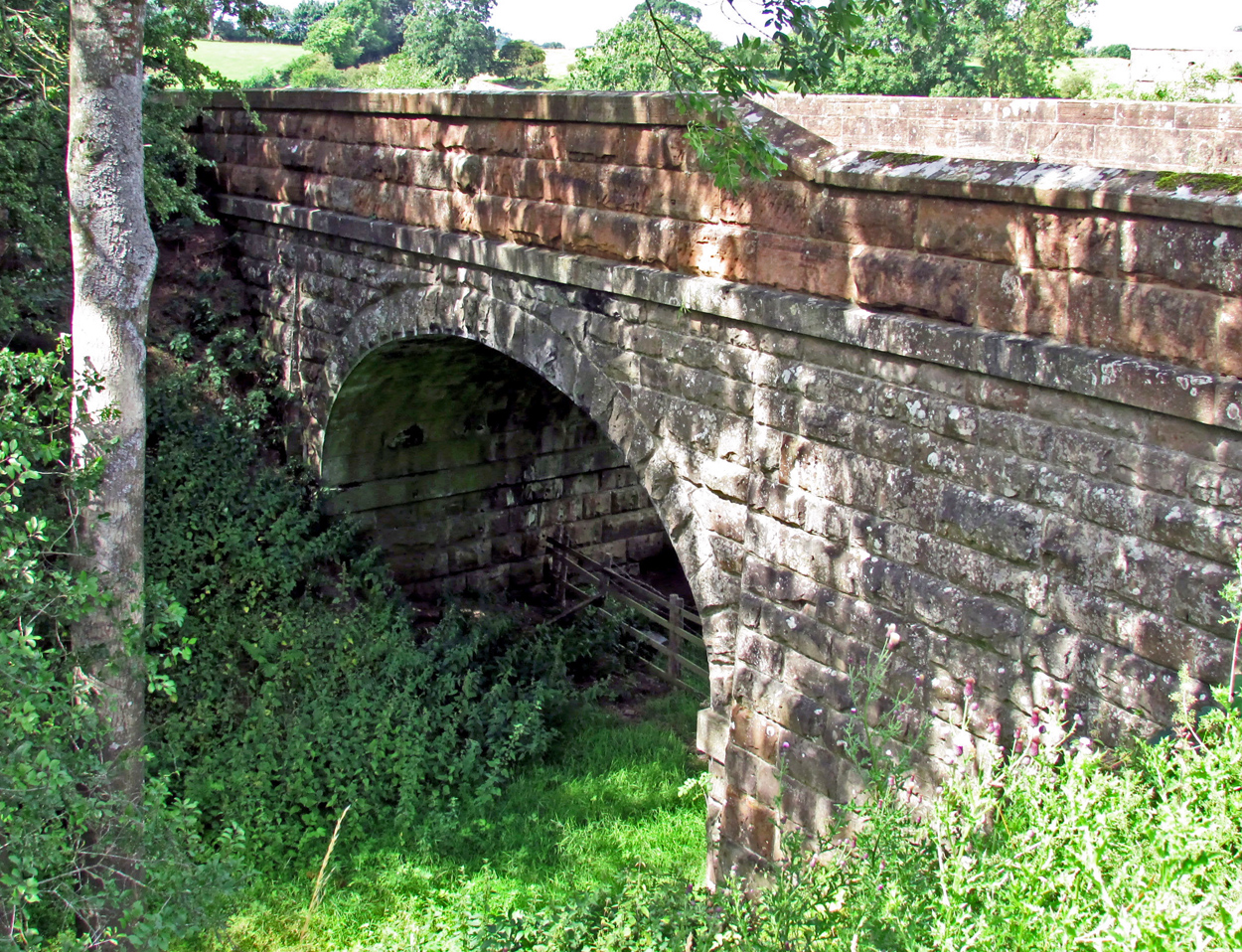
Great Musgrave Bridge prior to infilling

The issue came to a head in May/June 2021 when a bridge carrying the B6259 road over the dismantled Eden Valley Railway, close to Musgrave railway station, was infilled with more than 1,600 tonnes of aggregate and concrete despite NH being asked by Eden District Council not to start the works pending a review of the planning requirements.

The structure spanned a five-mile section of trackbed which local rail enthusiasts hoped to restore, linking the Eden Valley and Stainmore railways to create an 11-mile tourist line between Appleby and Kirkby Stephen. Highways England claimed to have consulted both railways prior to the work taking place, but this was denied by the two organisations who wrote a letter of complaint to Nick Harris, the company’s Acting Chief Executive.

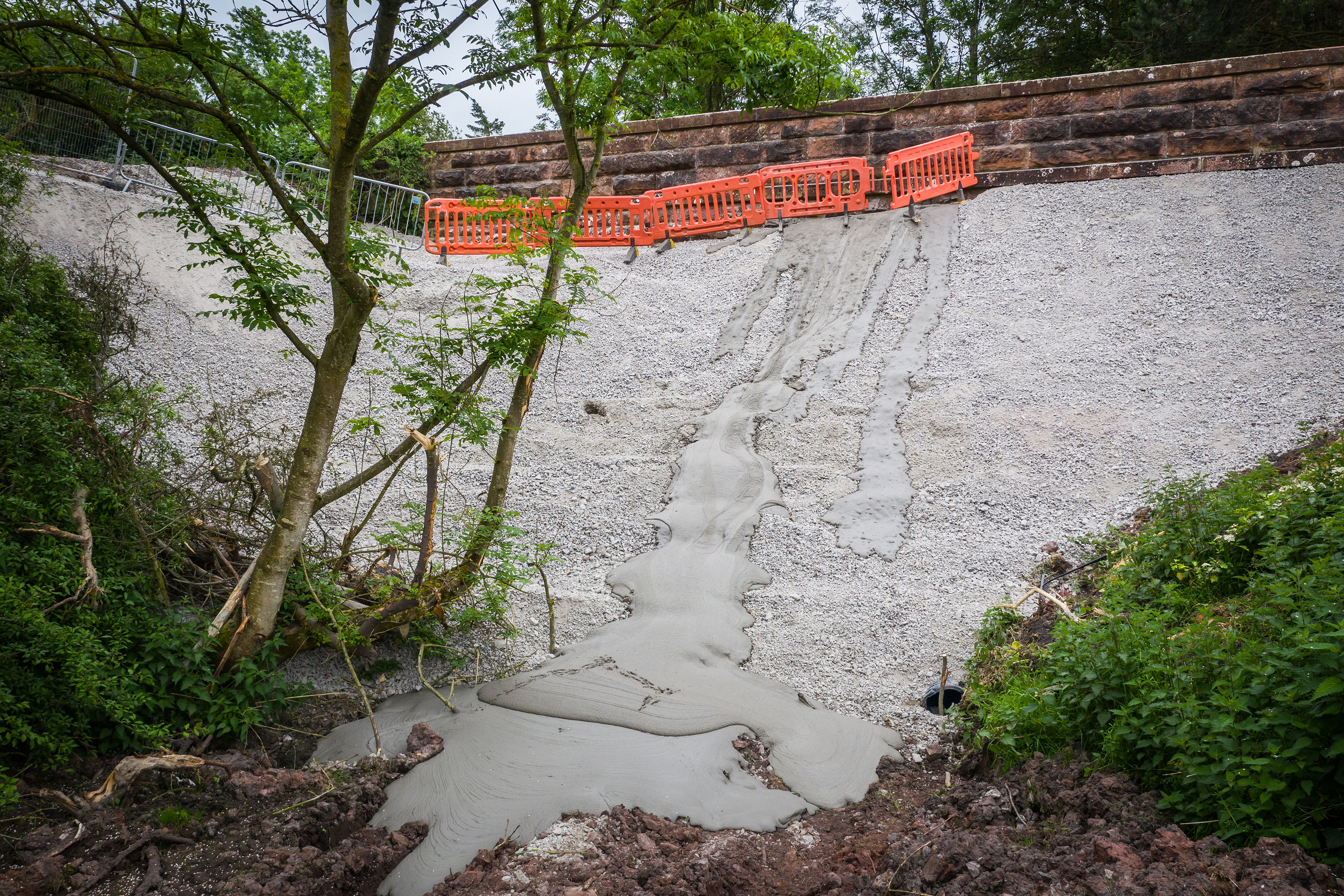
The north side of Great Musgrave Bridge after concrete had been poured under the arch.

The action provoked a public outcry. Lord Faulkner, vice chair of the All-Party Parliamentary Group on Industrial Heritage, raised the matter in the House of Lords, describing it as "cultural vandalism". Highways England was required to apply for retrospective planning permission for the infilling works, to which Eden District Council received 911 objections and two expressions of support. Advised by planning officers to reject the application, the council's planning committee unanimously refused retrospective planning permission on 16 June 2022.

Work to restore the bridge at Great Musgrave to its former condition cost £352,000, in addition to the £124,000 spent on the initial infilling work. No strengthening works were needed despite NH previously claiming that the structure was being overloaded. NH agreed to abide by an enforcement notice issued by Eden District Council which required the infill to be removed and the surrounding landscape restored to its condition prior to the infilling works. The works were completed in October 2023.

The backlash against the Great Musgrave infill scheme became national news and, in July 2021, the government intervened to pause infilling and demolition schemes at dozens of other railway bridges across the country. Many civil engineers expressed shame and embarrassment at the negative impact on their professional reputation.

The DfT commissioned a review from the walking and cycling charity Sustrans, which was published in March 2022 and identified that two-thirds of the structures cited for infilling or demolition had the potential for future reuse as part of the National Cycle Network or in local active travel schemes.

In 2022, NH implemented a new process to determine the nature of major works to the disused railway structures it manages. Proposals will be reviewed by the company's Stakeholder Advisory Forum which includes representatives from the Department for Transport, the Walk Wheel Cycle Trust, Railway Paths Ltd, the Railway Heritage Trust, The HRE Group, the Heritage Railway Association, Natural England, Historic England (also representing Cadw), Historic Scotland and ADEPT.

A bridge next to the restored station at Braughing is proposed for infilling, against the wishes of local campaigners.

Several bridges and tunnels have been infilled or demolished since the new process was implemented, but these have tended to be of lesser social value. However, a scheme at Braughing in Hertfordshire has attracted some controversy due to the likely impact of a proposed infill project on the heritage value of the restored railway station adjacent to it.

== Transfer to Great British Railways ==
On 26 October 2026, Rail Minister Lord Hendy confirmed that the Historical Railways Estate would be transferred to Great British Railways after GBR takes over the operation of most of Britain's mainline railway infrastructure and passenger services. Hendy asserted that the company would have "the capability, knowledge and experience to maintain the estate".

No timescale for the transfer has yet been announced.
