= Queensbury railway station =

Disused railway station in West Yorkshire, England

Queensbury
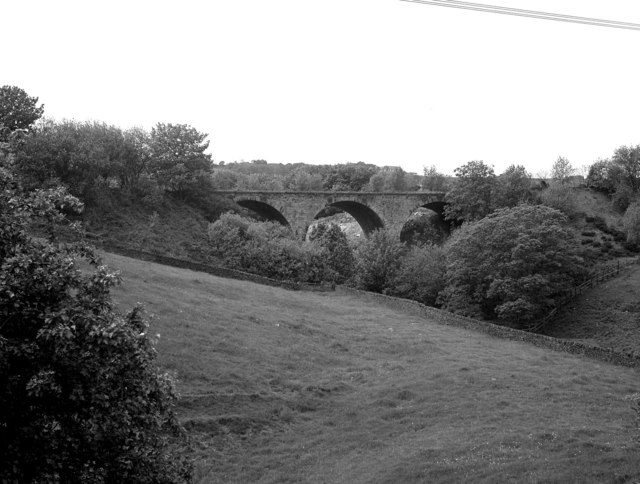
- A view of the former viaduct at the former site of Queensbury station.

General information
- Location: Queensbury, City of Bradford; England
- Coordinates: 53.77613°N 1.84064°W
- Grid reference: SE105311
- Platforms: 3 (1879–1890); 6 (1890–1955)

Other information
- Status: Disused

History
- Pre-grouping: Great Northern Railway
- Post-grouping: London and North Eastern Railway

Key dates
- April 1879: Opened
- January 1890: Station re-sited
- May 1955: Closed to passengers
- 1963: Closed completely
Location

Queensbury railway station was a station on the Queensbury lines serving the village of Queensbury, West Yorkshire, England. The station was unusual due to its triangular shape, and at its opening the only other examples of this arrangement were Ambergate station in Derbyshire and Earlestown in Lancashire; since then Shipley station, also in West Yorkshire, has gained platforms on all three sides. Of the stations on the Queensbury lines, this was the most ambitious.

== History ==
The station was located some distance away from the town itself, and at a considerably lower altitude; Queensbury is one of the highest settlements in England and the station was built at around 400 feet (120 m) lower than the village. Access was via a poorly lit footpath. Although the first line through Queensbury opened in 1878, it was not until April 1879 that the original station was built. This station had only three platforms, and was east of the junction where the lines from Bradford to Halifax and Keighley diverged. The third platform was a dead end providing a place for the Keighley trains to stop and start from. Queensbury station was 5 miles (8 km) from Halifax, 4 1/2 miles (7.2 km) from Bradford Exchange, and 8 miles (13 km) from Keighley.

By 1890, a newer station slightly to the west was opened, which had six platforms, (two each on the three arms of the junction) and a new access road to connect to the town. The new road provided by the Great Northern Railway cost £3,000 and the station cost £15,000 (both costing the equivalent to £2,502,000 in 2023). There were also three signal boxes at the station, one for each junction on the three station approaches (from Bradford, Keighley and Halifax respectively). However, in 1935, two of them were closed with all control worked from the East signalbox. The lack of level ground for the layout meant that some parts needed to be filled with rubble and stone before they could be developed, with the platforms on the Bradford-Keighley side, being built on a three-arch viaduct. However, some space was given over to goods workings; a small yard was behind the Halifax-bound platform from the Bradford direction, and a single line serving a tip in the middle of the station's triangle was served by a spur line from the Halifax-Keighley side of the lines. The station was listed as being able to handle general goods and livestock, but did not have its own fixed crane.

The triangular nature of the station was not unique; Ambergate railway station in Derbyshire had the same arrangement (six platforms). However, its platforms have been rationalised, as have those at Forres and Bishop Auckland (both triangular junctions). Bairstow argues that Earlestown and Shipley do not count, as Earlestown Manchester-bound platforms are tacked on further down, and Shipley has never had six platforms at the same time across all lines - the Leeds-bound platforms were added in 1979 and 1992, by which time, the Bradford-Skipton platforms had been reduced to one.

In 1949, the Halifax-Keighley platforms were little used. Most trains between the two towns didn't stop at Queensbury, but occasional and special services did. The arrival of trams in the town of Queensbury in 1901 affected passenger numbers. People arriving on train did not look forward to the climb out of the station along a poorly lit road, preferring to use the tram. In the 1920s, buses starting calling at the town, and Sunday services on the line were removed in December 1938. The station was closed to passengers in May 1955, and closed completely in 1963. Almost all of the station infrastructure has now been demolished.

The station at Queensbury has been filled in by inert landfill. The viaduct in the photograph has been demolished and nothing remains except a pile of rubble. The only real trace of the station is a little iron footbridge and the portal of Queensbury Tunnel. Clayton tunnel west portal can be found in a large crater that has not been infilled just beyond the iron footbridge.

The station site is one of the trailheads on The Great Northern Railway Trail that forms a path to Cullingworth along the former trackbed.

== Services ==
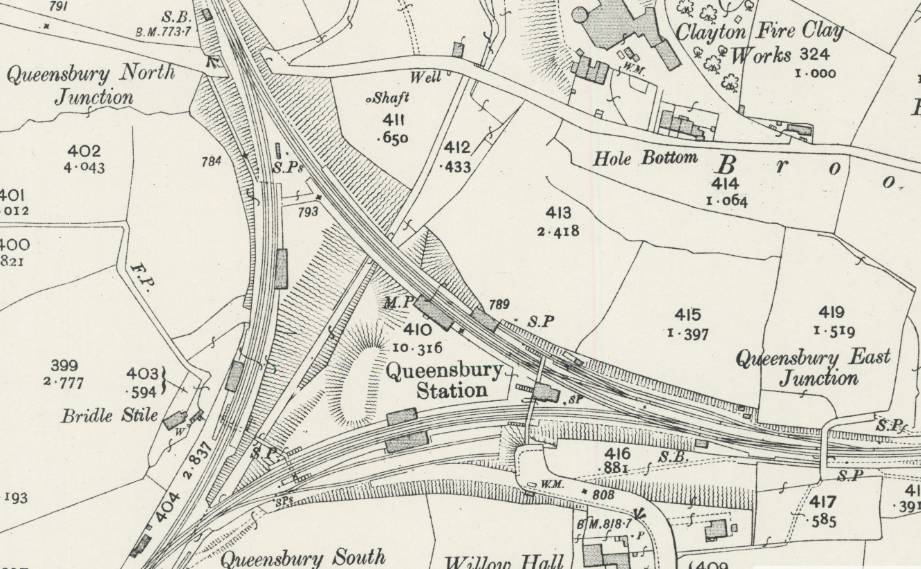
Queensbury triangle on an 1892-1914 Ordnance Survey map

Due to the station layout (the main station footbridge and building were at the east end of the station), catching a train at Queensbury was known to be difficult at times. Martin Bairstow commented in one of his books that when his grandparents used the line, they waited to see which way the train turned when it arrived at Queensbury as to whether or not they should stay on the train, or alight at the station.

In 1882, the Bradshaw's Timetable lists 25 workings from the Bradford direction which stopped at Queensbury. Some were direct trains from Leeds Central, others started at Bradford Exchange, and some of the trains were destined to terminate at Thornton railway station, the passenger service beyond Thornton not starting until 1884. In 1906, around 20 trains called at Queensbury en-route from Bradford, to Halifax and Keighley. The timetable blends all three services, so as is mentioned above, it is hard to see which trains are direct and which ones are the connections. In 1910, services from Queensbury per day amounted to 17 to Keighley, 18 to Halifax and 20 to Bradford. Timetabling connectivity meant that most services had a frequency which saw three trains arrive at the station within minutes of each, and allow passengers to interchange in any direction.

By 1944, and with the LNER running services, trains from Bradford to Halifax numbered twelve, Bradford to Keighley six, and a similar number for Keighley to Halifax. In July 1947, the pattern was still twelve services to Halifax from Bradford, seven from Bradford to Keighley, and five from Keighley to Halifax.

| Preceding station | Disused railways | Following station |
|---|---|---|
| Clayton | Great Northern Railway; Queensbury Lines | Thornton |
| Clayton | Great Northern Railway; Queensbury Lines | Holmfield |
| Thornton | Great Northern Railway; Queensbury Lines | Holmfield |
