= Great Horton railway station =

Disused railway station in West Yorkshire, England

Great Horton

General information
- Location: Great Horton, City of Bradford; England
- Coordinates: 53.78382°N 1.78574°W
- Grid reference: SE142319
- Platforms: 2

Other information
- Status: Disused

History
- Original company: Bradford and Thornton Railway
- Pre-grouping: Great Northern Railway
- Post-grouping: London and North Eastern Railway

Key dates
- 14 October 1878: Station opened
- 23 May 1955: Station closed for passengers
- 28 June 1965: closed for goods
Location

Great Horton railway station was a railway station on the Queensbury-Bradford section of the Queensbury Lines which ran between Bradford, Keighley and Halifax via Queensbury. The station opened for passengers in 1878 and closed on 23 May 1955 but remained open to goods with full staff until 28 June 1965 before it was closed, then demolished and the branch line tracks ripped up.

Due to the relatively steep inclines, tunnels and a viaduct, the Queensbury Lines were also known as "the Alpine Route". More information about the geographical setting and history of the Queensbury Lines is available at the Lost Railways West Yorkshire website.

The branch line through Great Horton was originally a land route connecting Bradford to Halifax for the transport of cloth to Manchester and elsewhere. Mail and stage coaches also used this route.

An 1871 map of Bradford shows the Great Horton area as simply farmland, fields and footpaths with the Horton Beck slightly north of the station site running through this shallow valley eastwards and down towards the city centre. Clearly, this branch line and Great Horton Station, built shortly after, were instrumental in the economic development of this portion of Bradford and points west.

The passenger station served the neighbourhoods of Great Horton and Lidget Green until service to and from Bradford town centre by more convenient and accessible electric trams, later trolley buses, along the parallel roads of Legrams Lane and Great Horton Road lured passenger traffic away from the station. A July 1947 timetable for passenger service from Bradford Exchange Station to Halifax via the Queensbury Line shows no less than 18 scheduled passenger trains passed through the station in the course of a weekday.

Besides passenger and parcels service from the station platforms, adjacent sidings and trackwork also served a general purpose goods shed, a coal tipple (or coal drops), the Horton Iron Works casting foundry, a number of nearby weaving mills for textile manufacturing, and others. Three significant textile mills were located a short distance from the station, including Kellett, Woodman & Co. Westcroft Mill, Worsted Mills, and Cannon Mills, currently re-purposed as a shopping village.

Freight operations during the 1950s included general goods and cargo as well as coal used as fuel by nearby households and industries. During the colder heating season a daily train delivered about a dozen wagons loaded with coal to the coal drops. The approach from Bradford was a rather steep incline and the steam engine would often struggle to find traction on the slippery rails, damp from the then-frequent morning fog. The engine would pull up beyond the Beckside Road bridge, then coast the wagons back down the slight incline to the coal drops on the south side of the station complex.

Various specialized types of sand of varying colours, textures and consistency were delivered to the casting foundry on the north side of the station complex, which had bunkers or drops to receive and store the sand needed for mould-making for casting large iron and steel parts.

Other freight operations entailed the receiving of general freight and cargo. A large number of empty barrels used for oils and chemicals, probably at the worsted weaving mills, ended up being stored in small mountains alongside the tracks on the northern side. Wagons being delivered or picked up from these sidings were shunted on an as-needed basis.

Operations were complex enough to warrant a dedicated signal box, which was located on the west-bound or Clayton platform side, across from the main station building. A metal overpass allowed passengers to cross over to or from the main station house to the opposite platform. In earlier days, access was also possible directly via metal stairs from the Beckside Road bridge to the station overpass below.

A map showing the layout of the station complex is shown on p.21 of "The Queensbury Lines".

During the late 1950s, the line was used to train operators of DMUs (Diesel Multiple Unit) which made practice runs on the line to and from Bradford.

No sign remains of the former station, platforms, signal box, or tracks. The site has been re-purposed for modern-day commercial and shopping use, with Cannon Mills now known as Cannon Mills Shopping Village.

Interest in this and other stations along the Queensbury Lines is maintained due to the support for continuing steam locomotive operations of the nearby Keighley and Worth Valley Railway historic preservation association.

The Queensbury Lines also have a lot of interest for railway fans and historians due to the variety of grades, cuttings, tunnels, and a long viaduct, all within a relatively short distance of each other.

Preceding station	Disused railways	Following station
Clayton	Great Northern Railway; Queensbury lines	Horton Park
