= BRB (Residuary) Limited =

British corporation

BRB (Residuary) Limited (BRBR) was the successor to the British Railways Board. It was created in 2001 as a private company limited by shares, with 100% of the issued share capital owned by the Secretary of State for Transport. As part of the Public Bodies Act 2011, the company was abolished in 2013.

== History ==
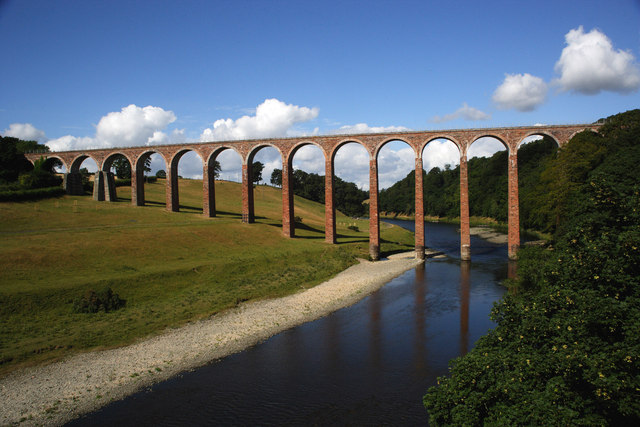
Closed Leaderfoot Viaduct was the responsibility of BRB (Residuary)

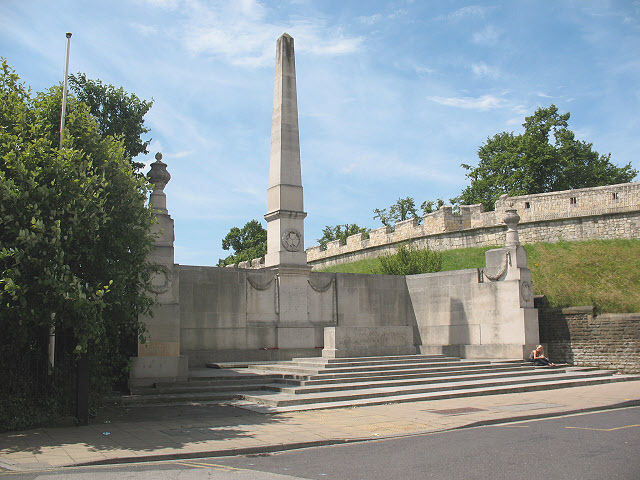
The North Eastern Railway War Memorial in York was the responsibility of BRB (Residuary)

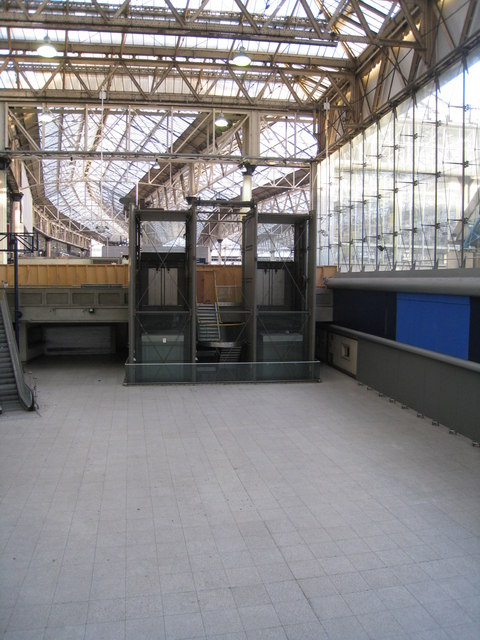
Waterloo International station became the responsibility of BRB (Residuary) following Eurostar vacating it in November 2007

Starting in 1994, as part of the Railways Act 1993, British Rail was divided up and privatised. By November 1997, British Rail had been divested of all its operating railway functions. However, the British Railways Board (BRB) remained in existence to discharge residual functions, mainly relating to liabilities, pensions, and responsibility for non-operational railway land which had not passed to Railtrack upon its formation in 1994. It also had responsibility for the British Transport Police (BTP).

In 1999, the United Kingdom Government decided to create the Strategic Rail Authority (SRA), which would incorporate the BRB and the Director of Passenger Rail Franchising. Both these bodies began acting together, under the trading name of the Shadow Strategic Rail Authority. In 2000, primary legislation, the Transport Act 2000, was enacted to place the SRA on a statutory basis. In accordance with this act, the BRB was abolished in 2001 and its remaining functions transferred to the SRA. Those functions which directly related to the old BR were placed in the charge of a wholly owned subsidiary of the SRA, BRB (Residuary) Limited (BRBR), which was incorporated in January 2001. Responsibility for the BTP passed temporarily to the SRA itself pending the creation of the British Transport Police Authority in 2004.

Upon the dissolution of the SRA under the Railways Act 2005, ownership of BRBR passed to the Department for Transport.

In 2010 the government announced its intention to abolish BRBR as part of its plans to reduce the number of public bodies and it was included in the Public Bodies Act 2011. On 30 September 2013, the company's assets and responsibilities were split between the Department for Transport, Highways Agency, London and Continental Railways, Network Rail and the Rail Safety and Standards Board. Following these transfers, BRBR was abolished.

== Responsibilities ==
As a residuary body, the company was responsible for discharging a variety of functions, including obligations in respect of liabilities acquired by British Rail as a major employer over nearly half a century (such as pensions and work related compensation claims) and as a direct result of the privatisation process. The company was responsible for the continuing disposal of non-operational railway land.

Among its larger assets were Glasgow Eastfield depot, North Pole depot, the Old Dalby Test Track, the Railway Technical Centre, Derby, and the closed Waterloo International station.

At the time of its cessation, BRBR owned 3,800 assets including 74 listed structures. Many of these were bridges, tunnels and viaducts on closed lines. It was also responsible for the maintenance of memorials to railway disasters and wars on the network as well as some shipwrecks.

== Successor organisations ==
BRB (Residuary) Ltd (BRBR) was abolished with effect from 30 September 2013. Its continuing functions have been dispersed to various successor bodies:

- Highways Agency Historical Railways Estate

The Highways Agency Historical Railways Estate is now responsible for the Historical Railways Estate (formerly known as the Burdensome Estate). This includes legacy bridges, abutments, tunnels, cuttings, viaducts and similar properties associated with closed railway lines.

- London & Continental Railways Ltd

London & Continental Railways Ltd (LCR) is now responsible for former BRBR properties with development potential, or which might be used for future railway projects, office buildings (The Axis, Birmingham; The Railway Technical Centre, Derby; Piccadilly Gate, Manchester). LCR is also acting as the managing agent on behalf of DfT for Waterloo International Terminal, North Pole International Depot and Temple Mills Bus Depot.

- Network Rail

Network Rail is now responsible for a small number of properties closely associated with the operational railway that should have transferred during railway privatisation or which should be maintained by the owner of the operational railway, various memorials commemorating those killed in railway accidents or rail employees killed during the world wars, and Old Dalby test track in Leicestershire and Nottinghamshire.

The full list of properties transferred to Network Rail is given in a schedule attached to the statutory instrument that abolished BRBR.

- Rail Safety and Standards Board

The Rail Safety and Standards Board (RSSB) is now the owner and holder of the intellectual property rights of the ‘RDDS managed documentation’ (consisting of drawings and maintenance documents and reports, generally relating to rolling stock built before 1996).

- Department for Transport

The Department for Transport (DfT) is now responsible for ill health claims from former British Rail (BR) employees.

== See also ==
- Bundeseisenbahnvermögen, the entity formed when the former German Federal Railways (Deutsche Bundesbahn) were dissolved
