= Queensbury, West Yorkshire =

Village in West Yorkshire, England

Coordinates: 53.768333°N 1.845278°W

Queensbury
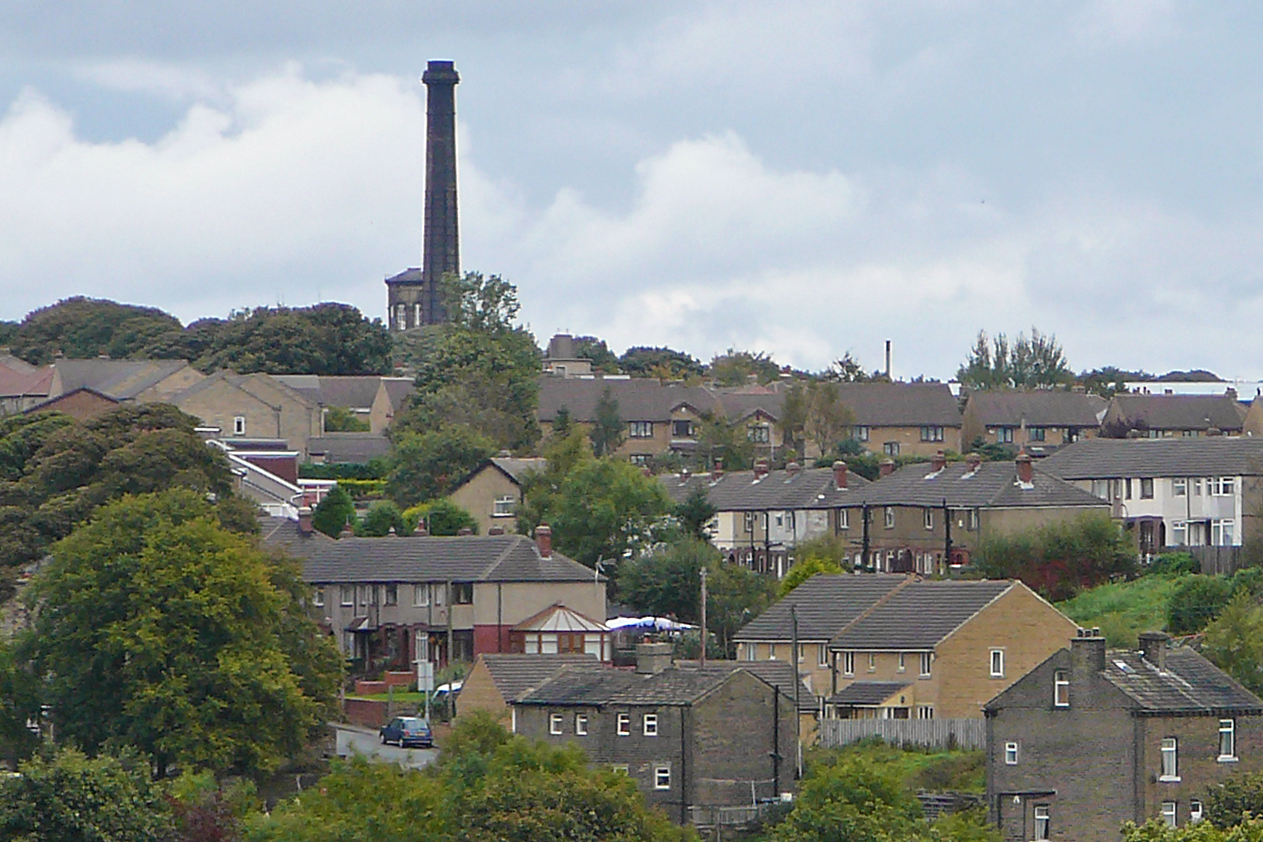
- Queensbury and the chimney of the former Black Dyke Mills

- Location within West Yorkshire
- Population: 16,273 (2011 Census)
- OS grid reference: SE105311
  - London: 175 mi (282 km) SE
- Metropolitan borough: City of Bradford
- Metropolitan county: West Yorkshire
- Region: Yorkshire and the Humber
- Country: England
- Sovereign state: United Kingdom
- Post town: BRADFORD
- Postcode district: BD13
- Dialling code: 01274
- Police: West Yorkshire
- Fire: West Yorkshire
- Ambulance: Yorkshire
- UK Parliament: Bradford South
- Councillors: Matthew Bibby (Conservative); Luke Majkowski (The Bradford South Independents); Hazel Parsan (Labour)

Queensbury is a village in the metropolitan borough and city of Bradford, West Yorkshire, England. Perched on a high vantage point above Halifax, Clayton and Thornton and overlooking Bradford, Queensbury is one of the highest parishes in England, with views beyond the West Yorkshire conurbation to the hills of Brontë Country and the Yorkshire Dales to the north and north west. Its population of 8,718 in 2001 increased to 16,273 in the 2011 Census.

Queensbury is known as being the home of Black Dyke Mills, and the Black Dyke Band.

== History ==
Queensbury was originally known as Queenshead, a name derived from a local public house, now a house on the High Street, which was popular with travellers on the pack horse route from Halifax to Bradford.

== Governance ==
The village was divided between the township of Clayton in the parish of Bradford, and the township of Northowram in the parish of Halifax, both in the West Riding of Yorkshire. It became a civil parish and urban district in 1894. In 1937 the civil parish was abolished, and the urban district was merged into the new Queensbury and Shelf Urban District. In 1974, the urban district was split; Queensbury was transferred to the City of Bradford in the new county of West Yorkshire.

Queensbury is a ward in Bradford Metropolitan District in the county of West Yorkshire, named after the village. It includes the villages of Clayton Heights and Horton Bank Top as well as a number of hamlets: Ambler Thorn, Calder Banks, Catherine Slack, Hazel Hirst, Hunger Hill, Little Moor, Mountain, Old Dolphin, Scarlet Heights, Shibden Head and West Scholes.

The ward typically voted for BNP and Conservative party councillors in the 2000s, however the decline of the BNP in the late 2000s and early 2010s saw a period of Conservative dominance in the ward. The 2020s have seen the first Labour councillors elected from Queensbury, amidst a national decline in Conservative party fortunes, and local disputes between candidates and the Conservative party caucuses causing the defections of Robert Hargreaves and Luke Majkowski in 2021 and 2022.

Councillors
Election	Councillor	Councillor	Councillor
2004	Tracey McNulty (Con)	Stuart Hanson (Con)	Michael Walls (Con)
2006	Paul Gregory Smith Cromie (BNP)	Stuart Hanson (Con)	Michael Walls (Con)
2007	Paul Cromie (BNP)	Lynda Cromie (BNP)	Michael Walls (Con)
2008	Paul Cromie (BNP)	Lynda Cromie (BNP)	Michael Walls (Con)
2010	Paul Cromie (BNP)	Lynda Cromie (BNP)	Michael Walls (Con)
May 2011	Paul Cromie (BNP)	Lynda Cromie (BNP)	Michael Walls (Con)
June 2011	Paul Cromie (The Queensbury Ward Independents)	Lynda Cromie (The Queensbury Ward Independents)	Michael Walls (Con)
2012	Paul Cromie (The Queensbury Ward Independents)	Lynda Cromie (The Queensbury Ward Independents)	Michael Walls (Con)
2014	Paul Cromie (The Queensbury Ward Independents)	Lynda Cromie (The Queensbury Ward Independents)	Michael Walls (Con)
2015	Paul Cromie (The Queensbury Ward Independents)	Lisa Dawn Carmody (Con)	Michael Walls (Con)
2016	Paul Cromie (The Queensbury Ward Independents)	Lisa Carmody (Con)	Lynda Cromie (The Queensbury Ward Independents)
By-election; 4 May 2017	Paul Cromie (The Queensbury Ward Independents)	Andrew Senior (Con)	Lynda Cromie (The Queensbury Ward Independents)
2018	Robert Hargreaves (Con)	Andrew Senior (Con)	Lynda Cromie (The Queensbury Ward Independents)
2019	Robert Hargreaves (Con)	Matthew Bibby (Con)	Lynda Cromie (The Queensbury Ward Independents)
2021	Robert Hargreaves (Con)	Matthew Bibby (Con)	Luke Majkowski (Con)
January 2022	Robert Hargreaves (The Bradford South Independents)	Matthew Bibby (Con)	Luke Majkowski (The Bradford South Independents)
2022	Hazel Parsan (Lab)	Matthew Bibby (Con)	Luke Majkowski (The Bradford South Independents)
2023	Hazel Parsan (Lab)	Alex Mitchell (Lab)	Luke Majkowski (The Bradford South Independents)
2024	Hazel Parsan (Lab)	Alex Mitchell (Lab)	Luke Majkowski (The Bradford South Independents)

indicates seat up for re-election. indicates councillor defection. indicates a by-election.

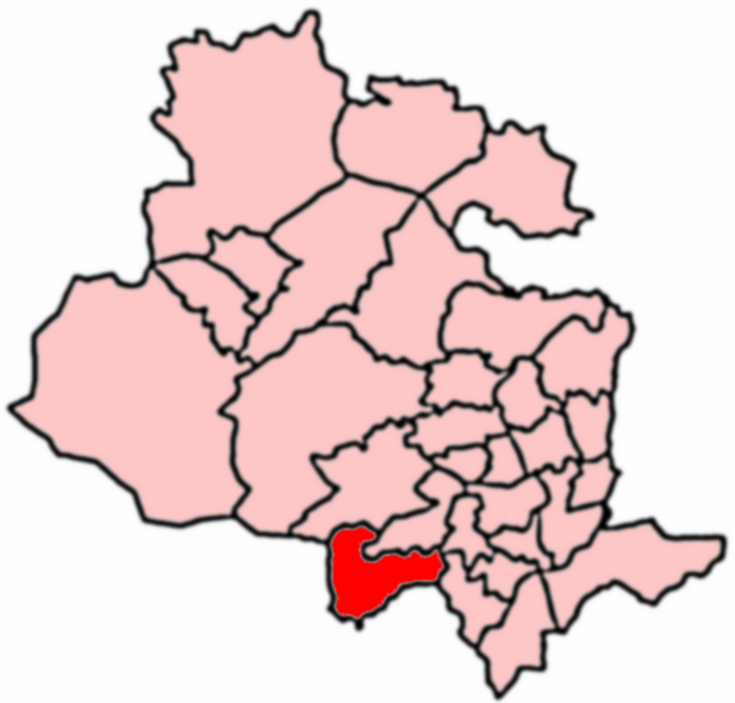
2004 boundaries of Queensbury Ward

== Black Dyke Mills ==
Black Dyke Mills was built from 1835 onwards by John Foster as a wool spinning and weaving mill specialising in worsted and mohair fabric, and by 1851 dominated the town. John Foster & Son, the owners of Black Dyke Mills, were responsible for the construction of many of the buildings in and around Queensbury, each being for the benefit of the employees, be it housing or accommodation, shops or leisure facilities. In 1891, the company erected the Victoria Hall in Queensbury for the benefit of its workers and the local community - it had a concert hall, with gallery to seat 650 people, library, billiards room and many other facilities. It also sponsored the Black Dyke Mills Band, a band of international renown.

The mill has now been converted into individual business units. The company now manufactures elsewhere in the area.

== Music ==
As well as being home to the world famous Black Dyke Band, Queensbury is also noted for its strong musical heritage. Home to the world-class rehearsal studio Backfeed, notable musical residents Giles Stocks and Joe Irish of Jon Jones and the Beatnik Movement, pop-punk trio State of Error, and the bands of the Sherry family, including the nationally successful Scarlet Heights (named after the hamlet), The Bad Beat Revue and Ti Amo. It is also home to Revolution, the band of the village's Scout group, who have won national youth band competitions and lead the village's annual Remembrance Day parade.

== Transport ==
Three railway lines once converged on Queensbury, one each from Halifax, Keighley and Bradford, known as the Queensbury Lines, all belonging to the Great Northern Railway (later the London & North Eastern Railway). Where they met was located Queensbury station, which famously consisted of continuous platforms on all three sides of a triangular junction, an uncommon layout in the United Kingdom (the only other examples were Ambergate, on the Midland Railway in Derbyshire and Earlestown in Lancashire).

A short distance from the station on the Halifax line was Queensbury Tunnel, 2,501 yards (2,287 m) in length (the second longest on the Great Northern system after Ponsbourne Tunnel in Hertfordshire), while close by on the Bradford line was Clayton Tunnel at 1,057 yards (967 m). All these lines were closed to passengers in May 1955, later to freight in the 1960s, before finally closing to all traffic in 1972–74. Campaigning is underway to extend the [Sustrans] Great Northern Trail (a walking and cycling route) to Queensbury, Bradford and, through a refurbished Queensbury Tunnel, to Halifax.

The main Bradford to Halifax road A647 road runs through the village as well as the A644 road. These roads intersect at the Albert Memorial. First Calderdale & Huddersfield & First Bradford bus route 576, runs through the village between Bradford and Halifax along the A647 road.

== Gallery ==
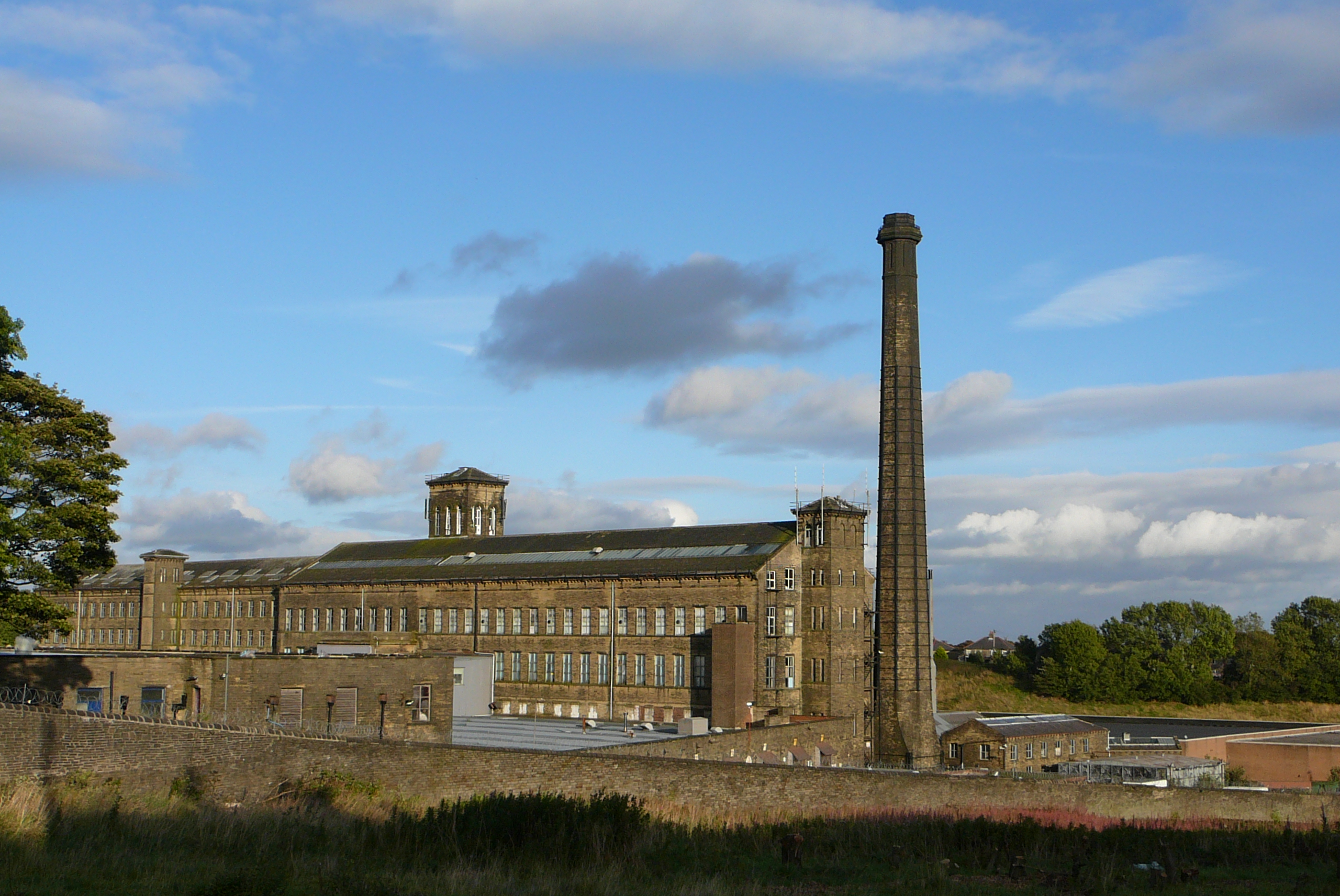
Black Dyke Mills

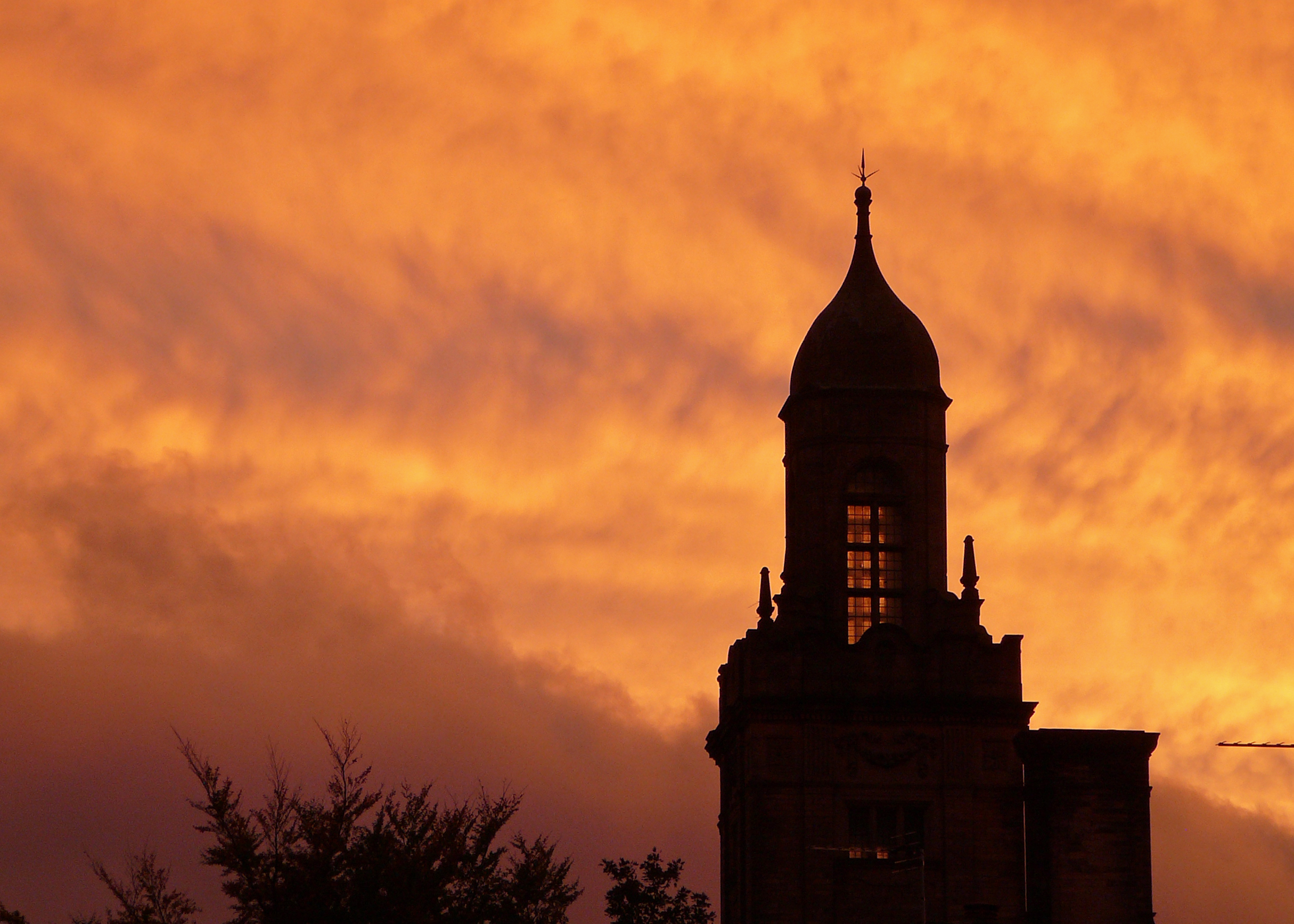
Sunset over Queensbury in September 2010.

== See also ==
- William Foster - John Foster's grandson
- Trinity Academy Bradford, a secondary school in Queensbury
- Listed buildings in Queensbury, West Yorkshire
